= 1983 NCAA Division III baseball tournament =

- Season: 1983
- Teams: 24
- Finals site: Pioneer Park; Marietta, Ohio
- Champions: Marietta (2nd title)
- Runner-up: Otterbein
- MOP: Jim Pancher (Marietta)

The 1983 NCAA Division III baseball tournament was played at the end of the 1983 NCAA Division III baseball season to determine the eighth national champion of college baseball at the NCAA Division III level. The tournament concluded with six teams competing at Pioneer Park in Marietta, Ohio, for the championship. Six regional tournaments were held to determine the participants in the World Series. Regional tournaments were contested in double-elimination format, with one region consisting of six teams, four regions consisting of four teams, and one region consisting of two teams, which was played as best-of-five, for a total of 24 teams participating in the tournament. The tournament champion was Marietta, who defeated Otterbein for the championship.

== Bids ==
The 24 competing teams were:

School	Nickname	Location	Conference	Tournament appearance	Last appearance	Consecutive tournament appearances	Previous best performance
Stanislaus State College	Warriors	Turlock, CA	Independent	7th	1982	2	National Champion (1976, 1977)
Concordia College	Cobbers	Moorhead, MN	Minnesota Intercollegiate Athletic Conference	1st	Debut	1	Debut
Eastern Connecticut State College	Warriors	Willimantic, CT	Independent	8th	1982	8	National Champion (1982)
Elizabethtown College	Blue Jays	Elizabethtown, PA	Middle Atlantic States Collegiate Athletic Conference	1st	Debut	1	Debut
Ithaca College	Bombers	Ithaca, NY	Inedependent College Athletic Conference	8th	1982	8	National Champion (1980)
University of La Verne	Leopards	La Verne, CA	Southern California Intercollegiate Athletic Conference	1st	Debut	1	Debut
Luther College	Norse	Decorah, IA	Iowa Intercollegiate Athletic Conference	1st	Debut	1	Debut
Marietta College	Pioneers	Marietta, OH	Ohio Athletic Conference	8th	1982	8	National Champion (1981)
Methodist College	Monarchs	Fayetteville, NC	Dixie Intercollegiate Athletic Conference	4th	1982	2	Regional Runner-Up (1982)
Monmouth College	Fighting Scots	Monmouth, IL	Midwest Collegiate Athletic Conference	3rd	1981	1	Regional Runner-Up (1976)
Montclair State College	Indians	Montclair, NJ	New Jersey State Athletic Conference	4th	1982	2	World Series Third place (1976)
North Carolina Wesleyan College	Battling Bishops	Rocky Mount, NC	Dixie Intercollegiate Athletic Conference	3rd	1982	3	World Series Fourth place (1981, 1982)
North Park College	Vikings	Chicago, IL	College Conference of Illinois and Wisconsin	1st	Debut	1	Debut
Ohio Northern University	Polar Bears	Ada, OH	Ohio Athletic Conference	5th	1982	4	Regional Runner-Up (1982)
Otterbein College	Cardinals	Westerville, OH	Ohio Athletic Conference	3rd	1982	3	Regional Third place (1981)
Ramapo College of New Jersey	Roadrunners	Mahwah, NJ	New Jersey State Athletic Conference	4th	1982	4	Regional Third place (1980, 1981)
Salem State College	Vikings	Salem, MA	Massachusetts State Collegiate Athletic Conference	1st	Debut	1	Debut
Salisbury State College	Sea Gulls	Salisbury, MD	Independent	5th	1981	1	Regional Runner-Up (1980)
Lynchburg College	Hornets	Lynchburg, VA	Old Dominion Athletic Conference	8th	1982	8	Regional Runner-Up (1977, 1978, 1981)
Upsala College	Vikings	East Orange, NJ	Middle Atlantic States Collegiate Athletic Conference	7th	1982	6	World Series Third Place (1980)
Washington University in St. Louis	Bears	St. Louis, MO	Independent	2nd	1982	2	Regional Third Place (1982)
William Paterson University of New Jersey	Pioneers	Wayne Township, NJ	New Jersey State Athletic Conference	4th	1982	3	World Series Sixth place (1982)
University of Wisconsin-Oshkosh	Titans	Oshkosh, WI	Wisconsin State University Conference	5th	1982	5	World Series Third place (1981)
Worcester State College	Lancers	Worcester, MA	Massachusetts State Collegiate Athletic Conference	1st	Debut	1	Debut

== Regionals ==
=== West Regional ===
Turlock, CA (Host: Stanislaus State College)

Stanislaus State (3–2), La Verne (2–3)

=== Mid-Atlantic Regional ===
Montclair, NJ (Host: Montclair State College)

Montclair State (3–1), William Paterson (3–2), Upsala (1–2), Salem State (0–2)

=== South Regional ===
North Carolina Wesleyan (4–1), Lynchburg (2–2), Methodist (1–2), Salisbury State (0–2)

=== Northeast Regional ===
Ithaca, NY (Host: Ithaca College)

Eastern Connecticut State (3–0), Ithaca (2–2), Ramapo (1–2), Worcester State (0–2)

=== Midwest Regional ===
Oshkosh, WI (Host: University of Wisconsin-Oshkosh)

Otterbein (3–1), Wisconsin-Oshkosh (3–2), Concordia (MN) (1–2), Washington-St. Louis (0–2)

=== Mideast Regional ===
Burlington, IA

Marietta (4–0), North Park (3–2), Ohio Northern (2–2), Luther (1–2), Elizabethtown (0–2), Monmouth (IL) (0–2)

== World Series ==
=== Participants ===
School	Nickname	Location	Conference	World Series appearance	Last appearance	Consecutive World Series appearances	Previous best performance
Marietta College	Pioneers	Marietta, OH	Ohio Athletic Conference	6th	1982	4	National Champion (1981)
Otterbein College	Cardinals	Westerville, OH	Ohio Athletic Conference	1st	Debut	1	Debut
North Carolina Wesleyan College	Battling Bishops	Rocky Mount, NC	Dixie Intercollegiate Athletic Conference	3rd	1982	3	Fourth place (1981, 1982)
Eastern Connecticut State College	Warriors	Willimantic, CT	Independent	2nd	1982	2	National Champion (1982)
Stanislaus State College	Warriors	Turlock, CA	Independent	6th	1982	2	National Champion (1976, 1977)
Montclair State College	Indians	Montclair, NJ	New Jersey State Athletic Conference	2nd	1976	1	Third place (1976)

=== Bracket ===
Pioneer Park-Marietta, OH (Host: Marietta College)

First round
1	Stanislaus State	6
6	Montclair State	5
2	NC Wesleyan	5
5	Eastern Conn. St.	4
3	Otterbein	5
4	Marietta	4

Second round/elimination round 1
Stanislaus State	12
Marietta	13
Montclair State	5
Eastern Conn. St.	6
NC Wesleyan	17
Otterbein	4
Stanislaus State	8
Otterbein	9

Third round/elimination round 2
Marietta	12
Eastern Conn. St.	6
NC Wesleyan	9
Otterbein	10

Elimination final
Marietta	6
NC Wesleyan	4

Final
Marietta	36
Otterbein	8

== See also ==
- 1983 NCAA Division I baseball tournament
- 1983 NCAA Division II baseball tournament
- 1983 NAIA World Series
