= 1982 NCAA Division III baseball tournament =

- Season: 1982
- Teams: 24
- Finals site: Pioneer Park; Marietta, Ohio
- Champions: Eastern Connecticut State (1st title)
- Runner-up: Stanislaus State
- MOP: Jeff Blobaum (Stanislaus State)

The 1982 NCAA Division III baseball tournament was played at the end of the 1982 NCAA Division III baseball season to determine the seventh national champion of college baseball at the NCAA Division III level. The tournament concluded with six teams, for the first time, competing at Pioneer Park in Marietta, Ohio, for the championship. Six regional tournaments were held to determine the participants in the World Series. Regional tournaments were contested in double-elimination format, with one region consisting of six teams, four regions consisting of four teams, and one region consisting of two teams, which was played as best-of-five, for a total of 24 teams participating in the tournament. The tournament champion was Eastern Connecticut State, who defeated Stanislaus State for the championship.

== Bids ==
The 24 competing teams were:

School	Nickname	Location	Conference	Tournament appearance	Last appearance	Consecutive tournament appearances	Previous best performance
Albion College	Britons	Albion, MI	Michigan Intercollegiate Athletic Association	2nd	1979	1	Regional Fifth place (1979)
Brandeis University	Judges	Waltham, MA	Independent	6th	1980	1	World Series Runner-Up (1977)
Stanislaus State College	Warriors	Turlock, CA	Independent	6th	1980	1	National Champion (1976, 1977)
Eastern Connecticut State College	Warriors	Willimantic, CT	Independent	7th	1981	7	Regional Runner-Up (1979, 1981)
Elmhurst College	Blue Jays	Elmhurst, IL	College Conference of Illinois and Wisconsin	3rd	1981	3	Regional Runner-Up (1981)
Ithaca College	Bombers	Ithaca, NY	Inedependent College Athletic Conference	7th	1981	7	National Champion (1980)
Marietta College	Pioneers	Marietta, OH	Ohio Athletic Conference	7th	1981	7	National Champion (1981)
Methodist College	Monarchs	Fayetteville, NC	Dixie Intercollegiate Athletic Conference	3rd	1977	1	Regional Fifth place (1976, 1977)
Montclair State College	Indians	Montclair, NJ	New Jersey State Athletic Conference	3rd	1978	1	World Series Third place (1976)
Nebraska Wesleyan University	Plainsmen	Lincoln, NE	Independent/Nebraska Intercollegiate Athletic Conference(NAIA)	2nd	1976	1	Regional third place(1976)
North Carolina Wesleyan College	Battling Bishops	Rocky Mount, NC	Dixie Intercollegiate Athletic Conference	2nd	1981	2	World Series Fourth place (1981)
Occidental College	Tigers	Los Angeles, CA (Eagle Rock)	Southern California Intercollegiate Athletic Conference	1st	Debut	1	Debut
Ohio Northern University	Polar Bears	Ada, OH	Ohio Athletic Conference	4th	1981	3	Regional third place (1980)
State University of New York at Oswego	Lakers	Oswego, NY	State University of New York Athletic Conference	1st	Debut	1	Debut
Otterbein College	Cardinals	Westerville, OH	Ohio Athletic Conference	2nd	1981	2	Regional third place (1981)
Ramapo College of New Jersey	Roadrunners	Mahwah, NJ	New Jersey State Athletic Conference	3rd	1981	3	Regional third place (1980, 1981)
St. Olaf College	Oles	Northfield, MN	Minnesota Intercollegiate Athletic Conference	6th	1981	6	Regional third place (1977, 1979)
Lynchburg College	Hornets	Lynchburg, VA	Old Dominion Athletic Conference	7th	1981	7	Regional Runner-Up (1977, 1978, 1981)
Upsala College	Vikings	East Orange, NJ	Middle Atlantic States Collegiate Athletic Conference	6th	1981	5	World Series Third place (1980)
Washington University in St. Louis	Bears	St. Louis, MO	Independent	1st	Debut	1	Debut
Widener University	Pioneers	Chester, PA	Middle Atlantic States Collegiate Athletic Conference	4th	1978	1	Regional Runner-Up (1977)
William Paterson University of New Jersey	Pioneers	Wayne Township, NJ	New Jersey State Athletic Conference	3rd	1981	2	Regional Fourth place (1977)
University of Wisconsin-Oshkosh	Titans	Oshkosh, WI	Wisconsin State University Conference	4th	1981	4	World Series Third place (1981)
York College of Pennsylvania	Spartans	York, PA	Independent	3rd	1981	2	Regional third place (1981)

== Regionals ==
=== Mideast Regional ===
First round
1	Albion	9
6	Otterbein	7
2	Marietta	3
5	Elmhurst	1
3	York (PA)	3
4	Ohio Northern	2^{10}

Second round/elimination round 1
Albion	3
Ohio Northern	7
Otterbein	1
Elmhurst	3
Marietta	17
York (PA)	1
Albion	6
York (PA)	2

Semifinals
Ohio Northern	10
Elmhurst	3
Marietta	11
Albion	8

Final
Ohio Northern	8	–
Marietta	14	–

=== South Regional ===
First round/elimination first round
Lynchburg	6
Methodist	5
North Carolina Wesleyan	7
Ramapo	0
Lower round 1
Methodist	11
Ramapo	1

Semifinal/elimination final
Lynchburg	3
North Carolina Wesleyan	4
Lower final
Lynchburg	4
Methodist	6

Final
North Carolina Wesleyan	1	11
Methodist	4	4

=== Midwest Regional ===
First round/elimination first round
St. Olaf	2
Nebraska Wesleyan	1
Wisconsin-Oshkosh	5
Washington-St. Louis	1
Lower round 1
Nebraska Wesleyan	3
Washington-St. Louis	7

Semifinal/elimination final
St. Olaf	3
Wisconsin-Oshkosh	2
Lower final
Wisconsin-Oshkosh	8
Washington-St. Louis	3

Final
St. Olaf	3	9
Wisconsin-Oshkosh	4	14

=== Mid-Atlantic Regional ===
First round/elimination first round
Montclair State	9
Upsala	8
Widener	5
William Paterson	3
Lower round 1
Upsala	5
William Paterson	7

Semifinal/elimination final
Montclair State	3
Widener	5
Lower final
Montclair State	10
William Paterson	15

Final
Widener	5	5
William Paterson	17	11

=== West Regional ===
Finals
Stanislaus State	6	8	10	–	–
Occidental	5	1	1	–	–

=== Northeast Regional ===
First round/elimination first round
Oswego State	6
Brandeis	5
Eastern Connecticut State	11
Ithaca	8
Lower round 1
Brandeis	3
Ithaca	2

Semifinal/elimination final
Oswego State	14
Eastern Connecticut State	16
Lower final
Oswego State	3
Brandeis	5

Final
Eastern Connecticut State	2	–
Brandeis	1	–

== World Series ==
=== Participants ===
School	Nickname	Location	Conference	World Series appearance	Last appearance	Consecutive World Series appearances	Previous best performance
Eastern Connecticut State College	Warriors	Willimantic, CT	Independent	1st	Debut	1	Debut
Stanislaus State College	Warriors	Turlock, CA	Independent	5th	1979	1	National Champion (1976, 1977)
Marietta College	Pioneers	Marietta, OH	Ohio Athletic Conference	5th	1981	3	National Champion (1981)
North Carolina Wesleyan College	Battling Bishops	Rocky Mount, NC	Dixie Intercollegiate Athletic Conference	2nd	1981	2	Fourth place (1981)
University of Wisconsin-Oshkosh	Titans	Oshkosh, WI	Wisconsin State University Conference	3rd	1981	3	Third place (1981)
William Paterson University of New Jersey	Pioneers	Wayne Township, NJ	New Jersey State Athletic Conference	1st	Debut	1	Debut

=== Bracket ===
Pioneer Park-Marietta, OH (Host: Marietta College)

First round
1	Marietta	5
6	North Carolina Wesleyan	3
2	Wisconsin-Oshkosh	12
5	William Paterson	11
3	Stanislaus State	5
4	Eastern Connecticut State	4

Second round/elimination round 1
Marietta	0
Eastern Connecticut State	4
North Carolina Wesleyan	11
William Paterson	6
Wisconsin-Oshkosh	0
Stanislaus State	1
Marietta	7
Wisconsin-Oshkosh	2

Semifinals
Eastern Connecticut State	3
North Carolina Wesleyan	2
Stanislaus State	4
Marietta	3

Final
Eastern Connecticut State	9	11
Stanislaus State	8	6

== See also ==
- 1982 NCAA Division I baseball tournament
- 1982 NCAA Division II baseball tournament
- 1982 NAIA World Series
