= 1980 NCAA Division III baseball tournament =

- Season: 1980
- Teams: 24
- Finals site: Pioneer Park; Marietta, Ohio, U.S.
- Champions: Ithaca (1st title)
- Runner-up: Marietta

The 1980 NCAA Division III baseball tournament was played at the end of the 1980 NCAA Division III baseball season to determine the fifth national champion of college baseball at the NCAA Division III level. The tournament concluded with four teams competing at Pioneer Park in Marietta, Ohio, for the championship. Four regional tournaments were held to determine the participants in the World Series. Regional tournaments were contested in double-elimination format, with all four regions consisting of six teams, for a total of 24 teams participating in the tournament. The tournament champion was Ithaca, who defeated Marietta for the championship.

== Bids ==
The 24 competing teams were:

School	Nickname	Location	Conference	Tournament appearance	Last appearance	Consecutive tournament appearances	Previous best performance
Alma College	Scots	Alma, MI	Michigan Intercollegiate Athletic Association	1st	Debut	1	Debut
Brandeis University	Judges	Waltham, MA	Independent	5th	1979	5	World Series Runner-Up (1977)
Buena Vista College	Beavers	Storm Lake, IA	Iowa Intercollegiate Athletic Conference	1st	Debut	1	Debut
Stanislaus State College	Warriors	Turlock, CA	Independent	5th	1979	5	National Champion (1976, 1977)
Eastern Connecticut State College	Warriors	Willimantic, CT	Independent	5th	1979	5	Regional Runner-Up (1979)
Elmhurst College	Blue Jays	Elmhurst, IL	College Conference of Illinois and Wisconsin	1st	Debut	1	Debut
Illinois Benedictine College	Eagles	Lisle, IL	Northern Illinois-Iowa Conference	1st	Debut	1	Debut
Ithaca College	Bombers	Ithaca, NY	Inedependent College Athletic Conference	5th	1979	5	World Series Runner-Up (1976)
Johns Hopkins University	Blue Jays	Baltimore, MD	Independent	2nd	1976	1	Regional Fourth place (1976)
Juniata College	Eagles	Huntingdon, PA	Middle Atlantic States Collegiate Athletic Conference	2nd	1978	1	Regional Fifth place (1978)
Mansfield State College	Mountaineers	Mansfield, PA	Independent/Pennsylvania State Athletic Conference(NCAA D-II)	3rd	1979	2	World Series Third place (1979)
Marietta College	Pioneers	Marietta, OH	Ohio Athletic Conference	5th	1979	5	World Series Runner-Up (1978)
North Adams State College	Mohawks	North Adams, MA	Massachusetts State Collegiate Athletic Conference	3rd	1977	1	Regional Fourth place (1977)
Ohio Northern University	Polar Bears	Ada, OH	Ohio Athletic Conference	2nd	1976	1	Regional Fourth place (1976)
Ramapo College of New Jersey	Roadrunners	Mahwah, NJ	New Jersey State Athletic Conference	1st	Debut	1	Debut
Rhode Island College	Anchormen	Providence, RI	Independent	3rd	1979	3	World Series Fourth place (1979)
University of Rochester	Yellowjackets	Rochester, NY	Independent	1st	Debut	1	Debut
Glassboro State College	Profs	Glassboro, NJ	New Jersey State Athletic Conference	5th	1979	5	National Champion (1978, 1979)
Salisbury State College	Sea Gulls	Salisbury, MD	Independent	3rd	1978	1	Regional Third place (1977, 1978)
St. Olaf College	Oles	Northfield, MN	Minnesota Intercollegiate Athletic Conference	4th	1979	4	Regional Third place (1977, 1979)
The College of Wooster	Fighting Scots	Wooster, OH	Ohio Athletic Conference	4th	1979	4	Regional Runner-Up (1978, 1979)
Lynchburg College	Hornets	Lynchburg, VA	Old Dominion Athletic Conference	5th	1979	5	Regional Runner-Up (1977, 1978)
Upsala College	Vikings	East Orange, NJ	Middle Atlantic States Collegiate Athletic Conference	4th	1979	3	Regional Third place (1976, 1979)
University of Wisconsin-Oshkosh	Titans	Oshkosh, WI	Wisconsin State University Conference	2nd	1979	2	Regional Fourth place (1979)

== Regionals ==
=== South Regional ===
First round
1	Glassboro State	4
6	Johns Hopkins	1
2	Salisbury State	3
5	Upsala	2
3	Ramapo	10
4	Lynchburg	9

Second round/elimination round 1
Glassboro State	3
Lynchburg	5
Johns Hopkins	1
Upsala	20
Salisbury State	4
Ramapo	2
Glassboro State	3
Ramapo	7

Semifinals
Lynchburg	4
Upsala	5
Salisbury State	5
Ramapo	4

Final
Upsala	5	19
Salisbury State	2	2

=== Northeast Regional ===
First round
1	Brandeis	12
6	Rochester	6
2	North Adams State	6
5	Rhode Island College	3
3	Ithaca	15
4	Eastern Connecticut State	7

Second round/elimination round 1
Brandeis	13
Eastern Connecticut State	9
North Adams State	0
Ithaca	7
Rochester	2
Rhode Island College	10

Semifinals/elimination round 2
Brandeis	1
Ithaca	6
North Adams State	7
Rhode Island College	6

Elimination final
Brandeis	8
North Adams State	12

Final
Ithaca	20	--
North Adams State	4	--

=== Mideast Regional ===
First round
1	Marietta	10
6	Alma	4
2	Wooster	5
5	Mansfield State	1
3	Ohio Northern	5
4	Juniata	3

Second round/elimination round 1
Marietta	7
Juniata	6
Wooster	15
Ohio Northern	2
Alma	2
Mansfield State	11

Semifinals/elimination round 2
Marietta	6
Wooster	4
Ohio Northern	4
Mansfield State	2

Elimination final
Wooster	7
Ohio Northern	3

Final
Marietta	14	--
Wooster	5	--

=== West Regional ===
First round
1	Illinois Benedictine	8
6	Elmhurst	5
2	Wisconsin-Oshkosh	6
5	St. Olaf	3
3	Buena Vista	12
4	Stanislaus State	8

Second round/elimination round 1
Illinois Benedictine	2
Stanislaus State	13
Elmhurst	2
St. Olaf	1
Wisconsin-Oshkosh	9
Buena Vista	4
Illinois Benedictine	6
Buena Vista	7

Semifinals
Stanislaus State	6
Elmhurst	3
Wisconsin-Oshkosh	16
Buena Vista	3

Final
Stanislaus State	3	–
Wisconsin-Oshkosh	12	–

== World Series ==
=== Participants ===
School	Nickname	Location	Conference	World Series appearance	Last appearance	Consecutive World Series appearances	Previous best performance
Ithaca College	Bombers	Ithaca, NY	Inedependent College Athletic Conference	3rd	1978	1	Runner-Up (1976)
Marietta College	Pioneers	Marietta, OH	Ohio Athletic Conference	3rd	1978	1	Runner-Up (1978)
Upsala College	Vikings	East Orange, NJ	Middle Atlantic States Collegiate Athletic Conference	1st	Debut	1	Debut
University of Wisconsin-Oshkosh	Titans	Oshkosh, WI	Wisconsin State University Conference	1st	Debut	1	Debut

=== Bracket ===
Pioneer Park-Marietta, OH (Host: Marietta College)

First round/elimination first round
Upsala	7
Ithaca	4
Marietta	4
Wisconsin-Oshkosh	3
Lower round 1
Ithaca	23
Wisconsin-Oshkosh	7

Semifinal/elimination final
Upsala	1
Marietta	17
Lower final
Upsala	5
Ithaca	7

Final
Marietta	4	5
Ithaca	5	15

== See also ==
- 1980 NCAA Division I baseball tournament
- 1980 NCAA Division II baseball tournament
- 1980 NAIA World Series
