= 1981 NCAA Division III baseball tournament =

- Season: 1981
- Teams: 24
- Finals site: Pioneer Park; Marietta, Ohio
- Champions: Marietta (1st title)
- Runner-up: Ithaca
- MOP: John Schaly (Marietta)

The 1981 NCAA Division III baseball tournament was played at the end of the 1981 NCAA Division III baseball season to determine the sixth national champion of college baseball at the NCAA Division III level. The tournament concluded with four teams competing at Pioneer Park in Marietta, Ohio, for the championship. Four regional tournaments were held to determine the participants in the World Series. Regional tournaments were contested in double-elimination format, with all four regions consisting of six teams, for a total of 24 teams participating in the tournament. The tournament champion was Marietta, who defeated Ithaca for the championship.

== Bids ==
The 24 competing teams were:

| School | Nickname | Location | Conference | Tournament appearance | Last appearance | Consecutive tournament appearances | Previous best performance |
|---|---|---|---|---|---|---|---|
| Alma College | Scots | Alma, MI | Michigan Intercollegiate Athletic Association | 2nd | 1980 | 2 | Regional Fifth Place (1980) |
| Buena Vista College | Beavers | Storm Lake, IA | Iowa Intercollegiate Athletic Conference | 2nd | 1980 | 2 | Regional Third Place (1980) |
| Claremont-Mudd-Scripps Colleges | Stags | Claremont, CA | Southern California Intercollegiate Athletic Conference | 3rd | 1979 | 1 | Regional Runner-Up (1979) |
| Eastern Connecticut State College | Warriors | Willimantic, CT | Independent | 6th | 1980 | 6 | Regional Runner-Up (1979) |
| Elmhurst College | Blue Jays | Elmhurst, IL | College Conference of Illinois and Wisconsin | 2nd | 1980 | 2 | Regional Fourth place (1980) |
| Ithaca College | Bombers | Ithaca, NY | Inedependent College Athletic Conference | 6th | 1980 | 6 | National Champion (1980) |
| Marietta College | Pioneers | Marietta, OH | Ohio Athletic Conference | 6th | 1980 | 6 | World Series Runner-Up (1978, 1980) |
| Monmouth College | Fighting Scots | Monmouth, IL | Midwest Collegiate Athletic Conference | 2nd | 1976 | 1 | Regional Runner-Up (1976) |
| North Carolina Wesleyan College | Battling Bishops | Rocky Mount, NC | Dixie Intercollegiate Athletic Conference | 1st | Debut | 1 | Debut |
| Ohio Northern University | Polar Bears | Ada, OH | Ohio Athletic Conference | 3rd | 1980 | 2 | Regional third place (1980) |
| Otterbein College | Cardinals | Westerville, OH | Ohio Athletic Conference | 1st | Debut | 1 | Debut |
| Queens College | Knights | New York City, NY (Queens) | Independent | 2nd | 1976 | 1 | Regional Fourth place (1976) |
| Ramapo College of New Jersey | Roadrunners | Mahwah, NJ | New Jersey State Athletic Conference | 2nd | 1980 | 2 | Regional third place (1980) |
| Salisbury State College | Sea Gulls | Salisbury, MD | Independent | 4th | 1980 | 2 | Regional Runner-Up (1980) |
| St. Olaf College | Oles | Northfield, MN | Minnesota Intercollegiate Athletic Conference | 5th | 1980 | 5 | Regional third place (1977, 1979) |
| State University of New York College at Cortland | Red Dragons | Cortland, NY | State University of New York Athletic Conference | 1st | Debut | 1 | Debut |
| The College of Wooster | Fighting Scots | Wooster, OH | Ohio Athletic Conference | 5th | 1980 | 5 | Regional Runner-Up (1978, 1979, 1980) |
| Lynchburg College | Hornets | Lynchburg, VA | Old Dominion Athletic Conference | 6th | 1980 | 6 | Regional Runner-Up (1977, 1978) |
| Upsala College | Vikings | East Orange, NJ | Middle Atlantic States Collegiate Athletic Conference | 5th | 1980 | 4 | World Series Third place (1980) |
| Westfield State College | Owls | Westfield, MA | Massachusetts State Collegiate Athletic Conference | 5th | 1980 | 1 | Regional Runner-Up (1977) |
| William Paterson University of New Jersey | Pioneers | Wayne Township, NJ | New Jersey State Athletic Conference | 2nd | 1977 | 1 | Regional Fourth place (1977) |
| University of Wisconsin-Oshkosh | Titans | Oshkosh, WI | Wisconsin State University Conference | 3rd | 1980 | 3 | World Series Fourth place (1980) |
| York College of Pennsylvania | Spartans | York, PA | Independent | 2nd | 1977 | 1 | Regional Fifth place (1977) |

== Regionals ==
=== West Regional ===
Wisconsin-Oshkosh (4–0), Elmhurst (2–2), Otterbein (2–2), Claremont-Mudd-Scripps (1–2), St. Olaf (1–2), Buena Vista (0–2)

=== South Regional ===
North Carolina Wesleyan (4–1), Lynchburg (3–2), Ramapo (2–2), Upsala (2–2), William Paterson (1–2), Salisbury State (1–2)

- Records as listed on Baseball Reference. Either William Paterson or Salisbury State would have to have been 0–2 instead of 1–2 and either Ramapo or Upsala would have to have been 1–2 instead of 2-2.

=== Mideast Regional ===
Ada, OH (Host: Ohio Northern University)

Marietta (5–1), Alma (3–2), York (PA) (2–2), Wooster (1–2), Monmouth (IL) (0–2), Ohio Northern (0–2)

=== Northeast Regional ===
Willimantic, CT (Host: Eastern Connecticut State College)

Ithaca (5–1), Eastern Connecticut State (3–2), unknown (2–2), Westfield State (1–2), Queens (0–2), SUNY Cortland (0–2)

== World Series ==
=== Participants ===
| School | Nickname | Location | Conference | World Series appearance | Last appearance | Consecutive World Series appearances | Previous best performance |
|---|---|---|---|---|---|---|---|
| Marietta College | Pioneers | Marietta, OH | Ohio Athletic Conference | 4th | 1980 | 2 | Runner-Up (1978, 1980) |
| Ithaca College | Bombers | Ithaca, NY | Inedependent College Athletic Conference | 4th | 1980 | 2 | National Champion (1980) |
| University of Wisconsin-Oshkosh | Titans | Oshkosh, WI | Wisconsin State University Conference | 2nd | 1980 | 2 | Fourth place (1980) |
| North Carolina Wesleyan College | Battling Bishops | Rocky Mount, NC | Dixie Intercollegiate Athletic Conference | 1st | Debut | 1 | Debut |

=== Bracket ===
Pioneer Park-Marietta, OH (Host: Marietta College)

First round/elimination first round
Wisconsin-Oshkosh | 13
North Carolina Wesleyan | 3
Marietta | 6
Ithaca | 5
Lower round 1
North Carolina Wesleyan | 6
Ithaca | 7

Semifinal/elimination final
Wisconsin-Oshkosh | 6
Marietta | 12
Lower final
Wisconsin-Oshkosh | 3
Ithaca | 11

Final
Marietta | 14 | --
Ithaca | 12^{12} | --

== See also ==
- 1981 NCAA Division I baseball tournament
- 1981 NCAA Division II baseball tournament
- 1981 NAIA World Series
