= 1979 NCAA Division III baseball tournament =

- Season: 1979
- Teams: 24
- Finals site: Pioneer Park; Marietta, Ohio, U.S.
- Champions: Glassboro State (2nd title)
- Runner-up: Stanislaus State

The 1979 NCAA Division III baseball tournament was played at the end of the 1979 NCAA Division III baseball season to determine the fourth national champion of college baseball at the NCAA Division III level. The tournament concluded with four teams competing at Pioneer Park in Marietta, Ohio, for the championship. Four regional tournaments were held to determine the participants in the World Series. Regional tournaments were contested in double-elimination format, with all four regions consisting of six teams, for a total of 24 teams participating in the tournament. The tournament champion was Glassboro State, who defeated Stanislaus State for the championship.

== Bids ==
The 24 competing teams were:

School	Nickname	Location	Conference	Tournament appearance	Last appearance	Consecutive tournament appearances	Previous best performance
Albion College	Britons	Albion, MI	Michigan Intercollegiate Athletic Association	1st	Debut	1	Debut
Ashland College	Eagles	Ashland, OH	Independent/Great Lakes Valley Conference(NCAA D-II)	2nd	1976	1	Regional third place (1976)
Brandeis University	Judges	Waltham, MA	Independent	4th	1978	4	World Series Runner-Up (1977)
Stanislaus State College	Warriors	Turlock, CA	Independent	4th	1978	4	National Champion (1976, 1977)
Claremont-Mudd-Scripps Colleges	Stags	Claremont, CA	Southern California Intercollegiate Athletic Conference	2nd	1978	2	Regional third place (1978)
DePauw University	Tigers	Greencastle, IN	Independent	3rd	1978	3	Regional third place (1977)
Eastern Connecticut State College	Warriors	Willimantic, CT	Independent	4th	1978	4	Regional third place (1976, 1978)
Illinois Institute of Technology	Scarlet Hawks	Chicago, IL	Independent/Chicagoland Collegiate Athletic Conference(NAIA)	1st	Debut	1	Debut
Ithaca College	Bombers	Ithaca, NY	Inedependent College Athletic Conference	4th	1978	4	World Series Runner-Up (1976)
Lawrence University	Vikings	Appleton, WI	Midwest Collegiate Athletic Conference	2nd	1977	1	Regional Fourth place (1977)
Mansfield State College	Mountaineers	Mansfield, PA	Independent/Pennsylvania State Athletic Conference(NCAA D-II)	2nd	1976	1	Regional Runner-Up (1976)
Marietta College	Pioneers	Marietta, OH	Ohio Athletic Conference	4th	1978	4	World Series Runner-Up (1978)
Pace University	Setters	New York City, NY	Independent	3rd	1978	3	Regional Fifth place (1977, 1978)
Rhode Island College	Anchormen	Providence, RI	New England State College Conference	2nd	1978	2	Regional Fourth place (1978)
Glassboro State College	Profs	Glassboro, NJ	New Jersey State Athletic Conference	4th	1978	4	National Champion (1978)
St. Olaf College	Oles	Northfield, MN	Minnesota Intercollegiate Athletic Conference	3rd	1978	3	Regional third place (1977)
Stillman College	Tigers	Tuscaloosa, AL	Independent	2nd	1978	2	Regional Fifth place (1978)
The College of Wooster	Fighting Scots	Wooster, OH	Ohio Athletic Conference	3rd	1978	3	Regional Runner-Up (1978)
Trenton State College	Lions	Ewing, NJ	New Jersey State Athletic Conference	1st	Debut	1	Debut
Lynchburg College	Hornets	Lynchburg, VA	Old Dominion Athletic Conference	4th	1978	4	Regional Runner-Up (1977, 1978)
Upsala College	Vikings	East Orange, NJ	Middle Atlantic States Collegiate Athletic Conference	3rd	1978	2	Regional third place (1976)
Virginia Wesleyan College	Marlins	Virginia Beach, VA	Dixie Intercollegiate Athletic Conference	1st	Debut	1	Debut
Westfield State College	Owls	Westfield, MA	Massachusetts State Collegiate Athletic Conference	4th	1978	4	Regional Runner-Up (1977)
University of Wisconsin-Oshkosh	Titans	Oshkosh, WI	Wisconsin State University Conference	1st	Debut	1	Debut

== Regionals ==
Bold indicates winner.

=== South Regional ===
First round
1	**Glassboro State**	**13**
6	Stillman	1
2	**Trenton State**	**2**
5	Lynchburg	1
3	**Upsala**	**8**
4	Virginia Wesleyan	1

Second round/elimination round 1
**Glassboro State**	**7**
Virginia Wesleyan	3
**Trenton State**	**5**
Upsala	2
Stillman	1
**Lynchburg**	**6**

Semifinals/elimination round 2
**Glassboro State**	**4**
Trenton State	3
**Upsala**	**2**
Lynchburg	1

Elimination final
**Trenton State**	**3**
Upsala	2

Final
**Glassboro State**	**6**	--
Trenton State	0	--

=== Midwest Regional ===
First round
1	**Mansfield State**	**3**
6	Wooster	2
2	**Ashland**	**4**
5	DePauw	1
3	**Albion**	**8**
4	Marietta	7

Second round/elimination round 1
Mansfield State	3
**Marietta**	**9**
**Wooster**	**15**
DePauw	8
**Ashland**	**19**
Albion	12
**Mansfield**	**17**
Albion	4

Third round/elimination round 2
Marietta	2
**Wooster**	**5**
Ashland	6
**Mansfield State**	**9**

Elimination final
**Wooster**	**4**
Ashland	1

Final
Wooster	3
**Mansfield State**	**4**

=== West Regional ===
First round
1	**Claremont-Mudd-Scripps**	**7**
6	St. Olaf	4
2	**Stanislaus State**	**13**
5	Lawrence	1
3	**Illinois Tech**	**4**
4	Wisconsin-Oshkosh	0

Second round/elimination round 1
Claremont-Mudd-Scripps	2
**Wisconsin-Oshkosh**	**3**
**St. Olaf**	**11**
Lawrence	6
**Stanislaus State**	**20**
Illinois Tech	2
**Claremont-Mudd-Scripps**	**2**
Illinois Tech	1

Third round/elimination round 2
Wisconsin-Oshkosh	6
**St. Olaf**	**9**
Stanislaus State	0
**Claremont-Mudd-Scripps**	**3**

Elimination final
St. Olaf	2
**Stanislaus State**	**19**

Final
**Stanislaus State**	**22**
Claremont-Mudd-Scripps	0

=== Northeast Regional ===
First round
1	**Rhode Island College**	**3**
6	Brandeis	0
2	**Ithaca**	**9**
5	Pace	0
3	**Eastern Connecticut State**	**3**
4	Westfield State	2

Second round/elimination round 1
**Rhode Island College**	**11**
Westfield State	5
Ithaca	2
**Eastern Connecticut State**	**4**
Brandeis	5
**Pace**	**6**

Semifinals/elimination round 2
**Rhode Island College**	**3**
Eastern Connecticut State	1
**Ithaca**	**17**
Pace	1

Elimination final
**Eastern Connecticut State**	**4**
Ithaca	2

Final
**Rhode Island College**	0	**7**
Eastern Connecticut State	**8**	5

== World Series ==
=== Participants ===
School	Nickname	Location	Conference	World Series appearance	Last appearance	Consecutive World Series appearances	Previous best performance
Glassboro State College	Profs	Glassboro, NJ	New Jersey State Athletic Conference	3rd	1978	3	National Champion (1978)
Stanislaus State College	Warriors	Turlock, CA	Independent	4th	1978	4	National Champion (1976, 1977)
Mansfield State College	Mountaineers	Mansfield, PA	Independent/Pennsylvania State Athletic Conference(NCAA D-II)	1st	Debut	1	Debut
Rhode Island College	Anchormen	Providence, RI	Independent	1st	Debut	1	Debut

=== Bracket ===
Pioneer Park-Marietta, OH (Host: Marietta College)

First round/Elimination First Round
Glassboro State	7
Mansfield State	3
Stanislaus State	12
Rhode Island College	4
Lower round 1
Mansfield State	13
Rhode Island College	0

Semifinal/Elimination final
Glassboro State	18
Stanislaus State	2
Lower final
Stanislaus State	8
Mansfield State	6

Final
Glassboro State	3	–
Stanislaus State	0	–

== See also ==
- 1979 NCAA Division I baseball tournament
- 1979 NCAA Division II baseball tournament
- 1979 NAIA World Series
