= 1983 NCAA Division II baseball tournament =

- Season: 1983
- Finals site: Riverside Sports Complex; Riverside, California
- Champions: Cal Poly Pomona (3rd title)
- Runner-up: Jacksonville State (1st CWS Appearance)
- Winning coach: John Scolinos (3rd title)
- MOP: Larry Beardman (OF) (Cal Poly Pomona)
- Attendance: 7,869

The 1983 NCAA Division II baseball tournament was the postseason tournament hosted by the NCAA to determine the national champion of baseball among its Division II colleges and universities at the end of the 1983 NCAA Division II baseball season.

For the fourth year, the tournament was played at the Riverside Sports Complex in Riverside, California.

Cal Poly Pomona defeated Jacksonville State, 9–7, in the championship game of the double-elimination tournament, capturing the Broncos' third national title and first since 1980. Cal Poly Pomona was coached by John Scolinos.

== Regionals ==
The regionals consisted of 20 teams in six groupings. Four regionals consisted of a 4-team double-elimination bracket while the remaining two played a best of five series. The top team in each bracket advanced to the 1983 Division II College World Series.

=== Northeast Regional ===
Team	Wins	Losses
Quinnipiac	4	1
New Haven	2	2
LIU Post	1	2
Le Moyne	0	2

=== South Atlantic Regional ===
Team	Wins	Losses
Valdosta State	3	1
Columbus State	3	2
West Chester	1	2
California (PA)	0	2

=== South Regional ===
Team	Wins	Losses
Florida Southern	3	0
Rollins	0	3

=== Central Regional ===
Team	Wins	Losses
Jacksonville State	3	0
Wright State	2	2
Troy State	1	2
Southern Indiana	0	2

=== Midwest Regional ===
Team	Wins	Losses
SIU Edwardsville	4	1
Minnesota State	2	2
Northwest Missouri State	1	2
Southeast Missouri State	0	2

=== West Regional ===
Team	Wins	Losses
Cal Poly Pomona	3	1
San Francisco State	1	3

== Finals ==
=== Participants ===
School	Conference	Record (conference)	Head coach	Previous finals appearances	Best finals finish	Finals record
Cal Poly Pomona	CCAA	41–22 (21–8)	John Scolinos	3 (last: 1980)	1st	9–3
Florida Southern	Sunshine State	41–22 (21–8)	Joe Arnold	11 (last: 1982)	1st	27–16
Jacksonville State	Gulf South	36–9 (12–1)	Rudy Abbott	2 (last: 1979)	5th	1–4
Quinnipiac	NECC	25–10 (9–3)	Dan Gooley	0 (last: none)	None	0–0
SIU Edwardsville	Independent	35–15	Gary Collins	3 (last: 1977)	2nd	4–6
Valdosta State	Gulf South	45–14 (10–2)	Tommy Thomas	4 (last: 1979)	1st	9–7

=== Results ===
==== Bracket ====
First Round
SIU Edwardsville	2
Valdosta State	7
Florida Southern	13
Quinnipiac	1
Cal Poly Pomona	8 ^{(11)}
Jacksonville State	4

Second Round
Valdosta State	8
Jacksonville State	12
SIU Edwardsville	8
Quinnipiac	6
Florida Southern	10
Cal Poly Pomona	11
Valdosta State	8
Florida Southern	1

Semifinals
Jacksonville State	8
SIU Edwardsville	7
Cal Poly Pomona	3
Valdosta State	0

Championship
Jacksonville State	7
Cal Poly Pomona	9

==== Game Results ====
Date	Game	Winner	Score	Loser	Notes
May 21	Game 1	Valdosta State	7 – 2	SIU Edwardsville	
May 21	Game 2	Florida Southern	13 – 1	Quinnipiac	
May 21	Game 3	Cal Poly Pomona	8 – 4 ^{(11)}	Jacksonville State	
May 22	Game 4	SIU Edwardsville	8 – 6	Quinnipiac	Quinnipiac eliminated
May 22	Game 5	Jacksonville State	12 – 8	Valdosta State	
May 22	Game 6	Cal Poly Pomona	11 – 10	Florida Southern	
May 23	Game 7	Valdosta State	8 – 1	Florida Southern	Florida Southern eliminated
May 23	Game 8	Jacksonville State	8 – 7	SIU Edwardsville	SIU Edwardsville eliminated
May 23	Game 9	Cal Poly Pomona	3 – 0	Valdosta State	Valdosta State eliminated
May 24	Game 10	Cal Poly Pomona	6 – 3	Jacksonville State	Cal Poly Pomona wins National Championship

== See also ==
- 1983 NCAA Division II softball tournament
- 1983 NCAA Division I baseball tournament
- 1983 NCAA Division III baseball tournament
- 1983 NAIA World Series
