= 1985 NCAA Division II baseball tournament =

- Season: 1985
- Teams: 20
- Finals site: Paterson Field; Montgomery, Alabama
- Champions: Florida Southern (6th title)
- Runner-up: Cal Poly Pomona (5th CWS Appearance)
- Winning coach: Chuck Anderson (1st title)
- MOP: Tom Temrowski (Florida Southern)
- Attendance: 23,416

The 1985 NCAA Division II baseball tournament decided the champion of baseball in NCAA Division II for the 1985 season. The Florida Southern Moccasins won their sixth national championship, beating the Cal Poly Pomona Broncos. Florida Southern coach Chuck Anderson won his first title with the team, while Florida Southern first baseman Tom Temrowski was named tournament MOP.

== Regionals ==
The regional round consisted of six groupings. Four of them matched four teams in a double-elimination tournament while the remaining two played best of five series for the right to advance to the College World Series.

=== Northeast Regional ===
First round
Le Moyne	9
LIU Post	7
New Haven	25
Pace	4
Lower round 1
LIU Post	0
Pace	10

Semi-finals
Le Moyne	5
New Haven	10
Lower final
Le Moyne	9
Pace	8

Finals
New Haven	16	—
Le Moyne	6	—

=== South Atlantic Regional ===
First round
Shippensburg	7
East Stroudsburg	2
West Chester
Valdosta State
Lower round 1
East Stroudsburg	3
Valdosta State	16

Semi-finals
Shippensburg	9
West Chester	8
Lower final
West Chester	3
Valdosta State	7

Finals
Shippensburg	13	6
Valdosta State	22	13

=== South Regional ===
Finals
Florida Southern	8	11^{11}	29	—	—
Florida Atlantic	2	10	11	—	—

=== Central Regional ===
First round
Troy State	7^{10}
North Alabama	6
Delta State	8
Grand Valley State	2
Lower round 1
North Alabama	9
Grand Valley State	10^{14}

Semi-finals
Troy State	10
Delta State	2
Lower final
Delta State	8
Grand Valley State	4

Finals
Troy State	10	—
Delta State	6	—

=== Midwest Regional ===
First round
SIU Edwardsville	8
Sam Houston State	4
Minnesota State	9
Lewis	8
Lower round 1
Sam Houston State	12
Lewis	3

Semi-finals
SIU Edwardsville	6
Minnesota State	5
Lower final
Minnesota State	5
Sam Houston State	12

Finals
SIU Edwardsville	4	—
Sam Houston State	3	—

=== West Regional ===
Finals
Cal Poly Pomona	5	9	14	5	9
Sacramento State	3	10	4	7	7

== Finals ==
=== Participants ===
School	Conference	Record (conference)	Head coach	Previous finals appearances	Best finals finish	Finals record
Cal Poly Pomona	CCAA	39–29–1 (23–7)	John Scolinos	4 (last: 1983)	1st	13–3
Florida Southern	Sunshine State	54–10 (21–3)	Chuck Anderson	13 (last: 1983)	1st	28–18
New Haven	NECC	28–6 (10–3)	Frank Vieira	7 (last: 1984)	2nd	12–14
SIU Edwardsville	Independent	36–15–1	Gary Collins	4 (last: 1983)	2nd	5–8
Troy State	Gulf South	40–13 (4–2)	Chase Riddle	3 (last: 1984)	3rd	4–6
Valdosta State	Gulf South	37–15 (–)	Tommy Thomas	5 (last: 1983)	1st	11–9

=== Results ===
==== Bracket ====
First round
1	Florida Southern	12
6	SIU Edwardsville	5
2	Cal Poly Pomona	6
5	New Haven	5
3	Valdosta State	19
4	Troy State	1

Second round
Florida Southern	10 ^{(12)}
Troy State	5
Cal Poly Pomona	10
Valdosta State	5
New Haven	10 ^{(11)}
SIU Edwardsville	9

Third round
Florida Southern	10
Cal Poly Pomona	3
Valdosta State	9
New Haven	11

Semifinals
Cal Poly Pomona	7
New Haven	2

Final
Florida Southern	15	—
Cal Poly Pomona	5	—

==== Game Results ====
Date	Game	Winner	Score	Loser	Notes
May 25	Game 1	Florida Southern	12 – 5	SIU Edwardsville	
May 25	Game 2	Cal Poly Pomona	6 – 5	New Haven	
May 25	Game 3	Valdosta State	19 – 1	Troy State	
May 26	Game 4	New Haven	10 – 9	SIU Edwardsville	SIU Edwardsville eliminated
May 26	Game 5	Florida Southern	10 – 5	Troy State	Troy State eliminated
May 26	Game 6	Cal Poly Pomona	10 – 0	Valdosta State	
May 27	Game 7	Florida Southern	10 – 3	Cal Poly Pomona	
May 27	Game 8	New Haven	11 – 9	Valdosta State	Valdosta State eliminated
May 27	Game 9	Cal Poly Pomona	7 – 2	New Haven	New Haven eliminated
May 29	Game 10	Florida Southern	15 – 5	Cal Poly Pomona	Florida Southern eliminated

== See also ==
- 1985 NCAA Division I baseball tournament
- 1985 NCAA Division II softball tournament
- 1985 NCAA Division III baseball tournament
- 1985 NAIA World Series
