= Tony Guzzo =

American baseball coach (1949–2024)

Biographical details
- Born: January 7, 1949
- Died: October 10, 2024 (aged 75); Norfolk, Virginia, U.S.

Playing career
- 1968–1971: East Carolina
- Position: Catcher

Coaching career (HC unless noted)
- 1972–1976: Norfolk Catholic HS (VA)
- 1976–1978: East Carolina (assistant)
- 1979–1982: North Carolina Wesleyan
- 1983–1994: VCU
- 1995–2004: Old Dominion
- 2005–2006: NC State (assistant)
- 2006–2007: Boston Red Sox (scout)
- 2008–2010: Louisburg (assistant)
- 2017–2024: Old Dominion (assistant)

Head coaching record
- Overall: 632–552–1

Accomplishments and honors

Championships
- 2 NCAA Division III Regional: 1981, 1982; 2 CAA regular season: 1996, 2000; 2 CAA Tournament: 1995, 1996

Anthony Guzzo (January 7, 1949 – October 10, 2024) was an American baseball coach. He was an assistant baseball coach Old Dominion University in Norfolk, Virginia, a position he had held since 2017. Guzzo served as the head baseball coach at North Carolina Wesleyan University in Rocky Mount, North Carolina from 1979 to 1982, Virginia Commonwealth University (VCU) in Richmond, Virginia from 1983 to 1994, and Old Dominion from 1995 to 2004.

== Career ==
Guzzo was raised in Elm City, North Carolina, where he played high school baseball for Elm City High School, where he graduated in 1968. Upon graduation, Guzzo played college baseball for East Carolina Pirates, where he was a catcher during his four-year career. Upon graduation in 1972, Guzzo became the high school baseball coach for Norfolk Catholic High School in Norfolk, Virginia, before receiving his first head coaching job, with North Carolina Wesleyan University. Guzzo served as the head coach for NC Wesleyan from 1979 until 1982, where in the final two years, he helped NC Wesleyan reach the NCAA Division III College World Series. He finished with a 102–66 record at NC Wesleyan.

In August 1982, ahead of the 1983 NCAA Division I baseball season, Guzzo was hired by Virginia Commonwealth University to lead the baseball program. At VCU, he finished with a 329–300–1 record. After the 1994 season, he joined Old Dominion University as the head baseball coach. There he coached the program for 10 seasons. During his tenure, Old Dominion won two CAA regular season titles (1996, 2000), two CAA Tournament titles (1995, 1996) and earned three NCAA Regional appearances (1995, 1996, 2000). Notable players that Guzzo coached at Old Dominion included Justin Verlander, Kevin Gibbs, Matt Quatraro, Tim Hummel, and Ron Walker. After the 2004 season, Guzzo left Old Dominion and became an assistant coach for North Carolina State University.

After stints as an area scout for the Boston Red Sox, an assistant at Louisburg College, and high school coaching for Nash Central High School, Guzzo returned to Old Dominion in 2017 as an assistant coach.

== Head coaching record ==
Record table
Season	Team	Overall	Conference	Standing	Postseason
North Carolina Wesleyan Battling Bishops (Dixie Intercollegiate Athletic Conference) (1979–1982)
1979	North Carolina Wesleyan	18–19	5–7		
1980	North Carolina Wesleyan	22–19	5–7		
1981	North Carolina Wesleyan	33–13	9–3		Division III College World Series
1982	North Carolina Wesleyan	29–15	6–2		Division III College World Series
North Carolina Wesleyan:		102–66 (.607)	25–19 (.568)		
VCU Rams (Sun Belt Conference) (1983–1991)
1983	VCU	13–32	0–16	4th (East)	
1984	VCU	19–28	4–12	4th (East)	
1985	VCU	20–32	4–14	4th (East)	
1986	VCU	26–32	4–13	4th (East)	
1987	VCU	25–22	5–11	4th (East)	
1988	VCU	45–16–1	11–5–1	1st (East)	NCAA Regional
1989	VCU	30–15	8–7	2nd (East)	
1990	VCU	18–29	2–14	4th (East)	
1991	VCU	35–22	10–6	3rd (East)	
VCU Rams (Metro Conference) (1992–1994)
1992	VCU	35–22	10–6	1st (East)	NCAA Regional
1993	VCU	30–27	4–10	6th	
1994	VCU	30–25–1	9–9	5th	
VCU:		326–302–2 (.519)	71–123 (.366)		
Old Dominion Monarchs (Colonial Athletic Association) (1995–2004)
1995	Old Dominion	39–20	9–9	5th	NCAA Regional
1996	Old Dominion	39–17	13–7	1st	NCAA Regional
1997	Old Dominion	34–20	12–8	2nd	
1998	Old Dominion	28–29	9–12	5th	
1999	Old Dominion	38–17	7–11	5th	
2000	Old Dominion	33–24–1	14–7	T–1st	NCAA Regional
2001	Old Dominion	19–37	6–15	5th	
2002	Old Dominion	26–17	8–12	4th	
2003	Old Dominion	18–33	5–15	4th	
2004	Old Dominion	26–28	13–11	5th	
Old Dominion:		290–242–1 (.545)	106–107 (.498)		
Total:		718–610–3 (.541)			
National champion Postseason invitational champion Conference regular season champion Conference regular season and conference tournament champion Division regular season champion Division regular season and conference tournament champion Conference tournament champion

== Death ==
Guzzo died in Norfolk, Virginia, on October 10, 2024, at the age of 75.
