= 1980 NCAA Division II baseball tournament =

- Season: 1980
- Finals site: Riverside Sports Complex; Riverside, California
- Champions: Cal Poly Pomona (2nd title)
- Runner-up: New Haven (1st CWS Appearance)
- Winning coach: John Scolinos (2nd title)
- MOP: Brian Zell (OF) (Cal Poly Pomona)
- Attendance: 8,437

The 1980 NCAA Division II baseball tournament was the postseason tournament hosted by the NCAA to determine the national champion of baseball among its Division II colleges and universities at the end of the 1980 NCAA Division II baseball season.

Cal Poly Pomona defeated New Haven, 13–6, in the championship game of the double-elimination tournament, capturing the Broncos' second national title and first since 1976. Cal Poly Pomona was coached by John Scolinos.

== Regionals ==
The regionals consisted of 18 teams in six groupings. Four regionals consisted of a 4-team bracket while the remaining two played a best of five series. All brackets were double elimination format. The top team in each bracket advanced to the 1980 Division II College World Series.

=== New England Regional ===
Team	Wins	Losses
New Haven	3	0
LIU Post	2	2
NYIT	1	2
Le Moyne	0	2

=== South Atlantic Regional ===
Team	Wins	Losses
FIU	3	0
Valdosta State	2	2
Columbus State	1	2
Shippensburg	0	2

=== South Regional ===
Team	Wins	Losses
Florida Southern	3	2
Eckerd	2	3

=== Central Regional ===
Team	Wins	Losses
Troy State	4	1
Bellarmine	2	2
Wright State	1	2
Delta State	0	2

=== Midwest Regional ===
Team	Wins	Losses
Mankato State	4	1
Northwest Missouri State	2	2
Southwest Missouri State	1	2
Morningside	0	2

=== West Regional ===
Team	Wins	Losses
Cal Poly Pomona	3	2
Cal State Northridge	2	3

== Finals ==
=== Participants ===
School	Conference	Record (conference)	Head coach	Previous finals appearances	Best finals finish	Finals record
Cal Poly Pomona	CCAA	42–25–1	John Scolinos	2 (last: 1979)	1st	5–3
FIU	Independent	41–14	Danny Price	0 (last: none)	None	0–0
Florida Southern	Sunshine State	45–11 (11–4)	Joe Arnold	8 (last: 1979)	1st	20–12
Mankato State	Northern Intercollegiate	36–21–1 (13–3)	Dean Bowyer	2 (last: 1979)	4th	0–4
New Haven	Independent	29–7	Frank Vieira	4 (last: 1979)	3rd	8–8
Troy State	Gulf South	30–12 (12–2)	Chase Riddle	0 (last: none)	None	0–0

=== Results ===
==== Bracket ====
First Round
Florida Southern	9
Mankato State	12
FIU	8
Troy State	2
Cal Poly Pomona	6
New Haven	4

Second Round
Mankato State	1
New Haven	3
Troy State	6
Florida Southern	3
Florida International	2
Cal Poly Pomona	12
Mankato State	8
Florida International	3

Semifinals
New Haven	15
Troy State	7
Cal Poly Pomona	10
Mankato State	4

Championship
New Haven	6
Cal Poly Pomona	13

==== Game Results ====
Date	Game	Winner	Score	Loser	Notes
May 24	Game 1	Mankato State	12–9	Florida Southern	
May 24	Game 2	FIU	8–2	Troy State	
May 24	Game 3	Cal Poly Pomona	6–4	New Haven	
May 25	Game 4	Troy State	6–3	Florida Southern	Florida Southern eliminated
May 25	Game 5	New Haven	3–1	Mankato State	
May 25	Game 6	Cal Poly Pomona	12–2	FIU	
May 26	Game 7	Mankato State	8–3	FIU	FIU eliminated
May 26	Game 8	New Haven	15–7	Troy State	Troy State eliminated
May 26	Game 9	Cal Poly Pomona	10–4	Mankato State	Mankato State eliminated
May 27	Game 10	Cal Poly Pomona	13–6	New Haven	Cal Poly Pomona wins National Championship

== See also ==
- 1980 NCAA Division I baseball tournament
- 1980 NCAA Division III baseball tournament
- 1980 NAIA World Series
