= 1979 NCAA Division II baseball tournament =

- Season: 1979
- Finals site: Lanphier Park; Springfield, Illinois
- Champions: Valdosta State (1st title)
- Runner-up: Florida Southern (5th CWS Appearance)
- Winning coach: Tommy Thomas (1st title)
- MOP: Frank DeGennaro (OF) (Valdosta State)
- Attendance: 12,815

The 1979 NCAA Division II baseball tournament was the postseason tournament hosted by the NCAA to determine the national champion of baseball among its Division II colleges and universities at the end of the 1979 NCAA Division II baseball season.

Valdosta State defeated defending champions Florida Southern in the championship game, 3–2, of the double-elimination tournament, capturing the Blazers' first national title. Valdosta State was coached by Tommy Thomas.

== Regionals ==
The regionals consisted of 32 teams in eight groupings. Each regional consisted of a 4-team bracket. All brackets were double elimination format. The top team in each bracket advanced to the 1979 Division II College World Series.

=== New England Regional ===
Team	Wins	Losses
New Haven	4	1
Quinnipiac	2	2
Springfield	1	2
UMass Lowell	0	2

=== Middle Atlantic Regional ===
Team	Wins	Losses
Le Moyne	3	0
California (PA)	2	2
UMBC	1	2
Shippensburg	0	2

=== South Atlantic Regiona ===
Team	Wins	Losses
Valdosta State	3	0
Columbus State	2	2
Rollins	1	2
West Georgia	0	2

=== South Regional ===
Team	Wins	Losses
Florida Southern	3	0
Eckerd	2	2
FIU	1	2
UCF	0	2

=== Great Lakes Regional ===
Team	Wins	Losses
Northern Kentucky	3	0
Bellarmine	2	2
Southern Indiana	1	2
Akron	0	2

=== North Central Regional ===
Team	Wins	Losses
Mankato State	3	0
UMSL	2	2
Southwest Missouri State	1	2
Northwest Missouri State	0	2

=== South Central Regional ===
Team	Wins	Losses
Jacksonville State	3	0
Delta State	2	2
Troy State	1	2
West Alabama	0	2

=== West Regional ===
Team	Wins	Losses
Cal Poly Pomona	3	0
UC Davis	2	2
Chapman	1	2
San Francisco State	0	2

== Finals ==
=== Participants ===
School	Conference	Record (conference)	Head coach	Previous finals appearances	Best finals finish	Finals record
Cal Poly Pomona	CCAA	43–26–1 (16–8)	John Scolinos	1 (last: 1976)	1st	4–1
Florida Southern	Sunshine State	40–12 (10–5)	Joe Arnold	7 (last: 1978)	1st	17–10
Jacksonville State	Gulf South	43–7 (7–5)	Rudy Abbott	1 (last: 1973)	6th	0–2
Le Moyne	Independent	31–8	Dick Rockwell	1 (last: 1978)	7th	0–2
Mankato State	Northern Intercollegiate	26–11–1 (14–4)	Dean Bowyer	1 (last: 1971)	4th	0–2
New Haven	Independent	29–11	Frank Vieira	3 (last: 1978)	3rd	6–6
Northern Kentucky	Independent	36–15	Bill Aker	0 (last: none)	None	0–0
Valdosta State	SAC	47–14–1 (8–4)	Tommy Thomas	3 (last: 1978)	3rd	4–6

=== Results ===
==== Bracket ====
First Round
Le Moyne	6
Mankato State	2
Cal Poly Pomona	3
Florida Southern	4^{13}
Jacksonville State	4
Valdosta State	15
New Haven	6
Northern Kentucky	3

Second Round
Le Moyne	3
Florida Southern	15
Valdosta State	3
New Haven	4
Consolation First Round
Jacksonville State	9
Northern Kentucky	8
Mankato State	4
Cal Poly Pomona	10

Third Round
Florida Southern	4
New Haven	3
Consolation Second Round
Le Moyne	7
Jacksonville State	0
Valdosta State	6
Cal Poly Pomona	3

Semifinals
Florida Southern	3
Valdosta State	11
New Haven	2
Le Moyne	3

Elimination final
Valdosta State	8
Le Moyne	3

Championship
Florida Southern	2
Valdosta State	3

==== Game Results ====
Date	Game	Winner	Score	Loser	Notes
May 24	Game 1	Le Moyne	6–2	Mankato State	
May 24	Game 2	Florida Southern	4–3 ^{13}	Cal Poly Pomona	
May 25	Game 3	Valdosta State	15–4	Jacksonville State	
May 25	Game 4	New Haven	6–3	Northern Kentucky	
May 26	Game 5	Florida Southern	15–3	Le Moyne	
May 27	Game 6	New Haven	4–3	Valdosta State	
May 27	Game 7	Cal Poly Pomona	10–4	Mankato State	Mankato State eliminated
May 27	Game 8	Jacksonville State	9–8	Northern Kentucky	Northern Kentucky eliminated
May 28	Game 9	Florida Southern	4–3	New Haven	
May 28	Game 10	Valdosta State	6–3	Cal Poly Pomona	Cal Poly Pomona eliminated
May 28	Game 11	Le Moyne	7–0	Jacksonville State	Jacksonville State eliminated
May 28	Game 12	Valdosta State	11–3	Florida Southern	
May 29	Game 13	Le Moyne	3–2	New Haven	New Haven eliminated
May 29	Game 14	Valdosta State	8–3	Le Moyne	Le Moyne eliminated
May 30	Game 15	Valdosta State	3–2	Florida Southern	Valdosta State wins National Championship

== See also ==
- 1979 NCAA Division I baseball tournament
- 1979 NCAA Division III baseball tournament
- 1979 NAIA World Series
