= 1978 NCAA Division III baseball tournament =

- Season: 1978
- Teams: 24
- Finals site: Pioneer Park; Marietta, Ohio, U.S.
- Champions: Glassboro State (1st title)
- Runner-up: Marietta

The 1978 NCAA Division III baseball tournament was played at the end of the 1978 NCAA Division III baseball season to determine the third national champion of college baseball at the NCAA Division III level. The tournament concluded with four teams competing at Pioneer Park in Marietta, Ohio, for the championship. Four regional tournaments were held to determine the participants in the World Series. Regional tournaments were contested in double-elimination format, with all four regions consisting of six teams, for a total of 24 teams participating in the tournament, up from 22 in 1977. The tournament champion was Glassboro State, who defeated Marietta for the championship.

== Bids ==
The 24 competing teams were:

School	Nickname	Location	Conference	Tournament appearance	Last appearance	Consecutive tournament appearances	Previous best performance
Brandeis University	Judges	Waltham, MA	Independent	3rd	1977	3	World Series Runner-Up (1977)
Claremont-Mudd-Scripps Colleges	Stags	Claremont, CA	Southern California Intercollegiate Athletic Conference	1st	Debut	1	Debut
Coe College	Kohawks	Cedar Rapids, IA	Midwest Collegiate Athletic Conference	2nd	1977	2	Regional Runner-Up (1977)
Stanislaus State College	Warriors	Turlock, CA	Independent	3rd	1977	3	National Champion (1976, 1977)
DePauw University	Tigers	Greencastle, IN	Independent	2nd	1977	2	Regional Third place (1977)
Eastern Connecticut State College	Warriors	Willimantic, CT	Independent	3rd	1977	3	Regional Third place (1976)
Illinois Wesleyan University	Titans	Bloomington, IL	College Conference of Illinois and Wisconsin	1st	Debut	1	Debut
Ithaca College	Bombers	Ithaca, NY	Inedependent College Athletic Conference	3rd	1977	3	World Series Runner-Up (1976)
Juniata College	Eagles	Huntingdon, PA	Middle Atlantic States Collegiate Athletic Conference	1st	Debut	1	Debut
Marietta College	Pioneers	Marietta, OH	Ohio Athletic Conference	3rd	1977	3	World Series Fourth place (1977)
University of Minnesota Morris	Cougars	Morris, MN	Independent/Northern Inetercollegiate Conference(NCAA D-II)	1st	Debut	1	Debut
Montclair State College	Indians	Montclair, NJ	New Jersey State Athletic Conference	2nd	1976	1	World Series Third place (1976)
Pace University	Setters	New York City, NY	Knickerbocker Conference	2nd	1977	2	Regional Sixth place (1977)
Rhode Island College	Anchormen	Providence, RI	New England State College Conference	1st	Debut	1	Debut
Glassboro State College	Profs	Glassboro, NJ	New Jersey State Athletic Conference	3rd	1977	3	World Series Third place (1977)
Salisbury State College	Sea Gulls	Salisbury, MD	Independent	2nd	1977	2	Regional Third place (1977)
St. Olaf College	Oles	Northfield, MN	Minnesota Intercollegiate Athletic Conference	2nd	1977	2	Regional Third place (1977)
Stillman College	Tigers	Tuscaloosa, AL	Independent	1st	Debut	1	Debut
The College of Wooster	Fighting Scots	Wooster, OH	Ohio Athletic Conference	2nd	1977	2	Regional Fourth place (1977)
Lynchburg College	Hornets	Lynchburg, VA	Old Dominion Athletic Conference	3rd	1977	3	Regional Runner-Up (1977)
Upsala College	Vikings	East Orange, NJ	Middle Atlantic States Collegiate Athletic Conference	2nd	1976	1	Regional Third place (1976)
Westfield State College	Owls	Westfield, MA	Massachusetts State Collegiate Athletic Conference	3rd	1977	3	Regional Runner-Up (1977)
Widener College	Pioneers	Chester, PA	Middle Atlantic States Collegiate Athletic Conference	3rd	1977	3	Regional Runner-Up (1977)
Wilkes College	Colonels	Wilkes-Barre, PA	Middle Atlantic States Collegiate Athletic Conference	3rd	1977	3	World Series Fourth place (1976)

== Regionals ==
Bold indicates winner.

=== South Regional ===
First round
1	**Lynchburg**	**5**
6	Montclair State	4
2	**Salisbury State**	**10**
5	Stillman	5
3	**Glassboro State**	**5**
4	Upsala	3

Second round/elimination round 1
**Lynchburg**	**2**
Upsala	1
**Salisbury State**	**5**
Glassboro State	4
**Montclair State**	**14**
Stillman	1

Semifinals/elimination round 2
**Lynchburg**	**16**
Salisbury State	4
**Glassboro State**	**10**
Montclair State	9

Elimination final
Salisbury State	4
**Glassboro State**	**8**

Final
Lynchburg	4	3
**Glassboro State**	**5**	**5**

=== West Regional ===
First round
1	**Illinois Wesleyan**	**3**
6	St. Olaf	2
2	**Stanislaus State**	**3**
5	Minnesota-Morris	2
3	**Claremont-Mudd-Scripps**	**9**
4	Coe	8

Second round/elimination round 1
**Illinois Wesleyan**	**7**
Coe	6
**Stanislaus State**	**12**
Claremont-Mudd-Scripps	3
**St. Olaf**	**5**
Minnesota-Morris	4

Semifinals/elimination round 2
Illinois Wesleyan	0
**Stanislaus State**	**6**
**Claremont-Mudd-Scripps**	**5**
St. Olaf	2

Elimination final
**Illinois Wesleyan**	**5**
Claremont-Mudd-Scripps	3

Final
**Stanislaus State**	12	**6**
Illinois Wesleyan	**14**	3

=== Northeast Regional ===
First round
1	**Ithaca**	**8**
6	Westfield State	5
2	**Brandeis**	**7**
5	Rhode Island College	5
3	**Eastern Connecticut State**	**4**
4	Pace	3

Second round/elimination round 1
**Ithaca**	**9**
Pace	6
Brandeis	4
**Eastern Connecticut State**	**8**
Westfield State	?
**Rhode Island College**	**9**

Semifinals/elimination round 2
**Ithaca**	**13**
Eastern Connecticut State	10
**Brandeis**	**6**
Rhode Island College	5

Elimination final
Eastern Connecticut State	6
**Brandeis**	**8**

Final
**Ithaca**	**19**	--
Brandeis	5	--

=== Mideast Regional ===
First round
1	**Wilkes**	**7**
6	DePauw	5
2	**Wooster**	**12**
5	Widener	7
3	**Marietta**	**5**
4	Juniata	2

Second round/elimination round 1
**Wilkes**	**8**
Juniata	2
Wooster	0
**Marietta**	**12**
DePauw	2
**Widener**	**3**

Semifinals/elimination round 2
Wilkes	6
**Marietta**	**7**
**Wooster**	**6**
Widener	2

Elimination final
Wilkes	5
**Wooster**	**6**

Final
**Marietta**	**10**	--
Wooster	1	--

== World Series ==
=== Participants ===
School	Nickname	Location	Conference	World Series appearance	Last appearance	Consecutive World Series appearances	Previous best performance
Glassboro State College	Profs	Glassboro, NJ	New Jersey State Athletic Conference	2nd	1977	2	Third Place (1977)
Marietta College	Pioneers	Marietta, OH	Ohio Athletic Conference	2nd	1977	2	Fourth Place (1977)
Ithaca College	Bombers	Ithaca, NY	Inedependent College Athletic Conference	2nd	1976	1	Runner-Up (1976)
Stanislaus State College	Warriors	Turlock, CA	Independent	3rd	1977	3	National Champion (1976, 1977)

=== Bracket ===
Pioneer Park-Marietta, OH (Host: Marietta College)

First round/elimination first round
Glassboro State	4
Stanislaus State	3
Ithaca	7
Marietta	3
Lower round 1
Stanislaus State	4
Marietta	5^{12}

Semifinal/elimination final
Glassboro State	7
Ithaca	1
Lower final
Ithaca	4
Marietta	11

Final
Glassboro State	10	5
Marietta	11	3

== See also ==
- 1978 NCAA Division I baseball tournament
- 1978 NCAA Division II baseball tournament
- 1978 NAIA World Series
