= 1988 VCU Rams baseball team =

American college baseball season

1988 VCU Rams baseball

Sun Belt Conference tournament champions

NCAA Coral Gables Regional, 0–2
- Conference: Sun Belt Conference
- Record: 45–16–1 (11–5 SBC)
- Head coach: Tony Guzzo (6th season)
- Home stadium: The Diamond

1988 Sun Belt Conference baseball standings
	Conf.				Overall
Team	W		L	PCT	W		L	PCT
East
VCU ‍‍‡‍^{y}	11	–	5	.688	45	–	16	.738
Jacksonville ‍‍‍	11	–	6	.647	39	–	24	.619
Charlotte ‍‍‍	7	–	10	.412	28	–	27	.509
Old Dominion ‍‍‍	5	–	13	.278	24	–	31	.436
Coastal
Western Kentucky ‍‍‍	14	–	4	.778	43	–	21	.672
South Alabama ‍‍‍	11	–	7	.611	41	–	22	.651
South Florida ‍‍‍	5	–	11	.313	26	–	33	.441
UAB ‍‍‍	4	–	12	.250	22	–	28	.440
x – Division champion ‡ – Tournament champion y – Invited to the NCAA tournament As of July 1, 1988; Rankings from D1Baseball

The 1988 VCU Rams baseball team represented Virginia Commonwealth University during the 1988 NCAA Division I baseball season. The Rams played their home games at The Diamond as a member of the Sun Belt Conference. They led by head coach Tony Guzzo, in his sixth season with the program.

== Offseason ==
=== 1987 MLB draft ===
Round	Pick	Player	Position	MLB Team
#15	#377	Chris Pender	INF	Baltimore Orioles

== Game log ==
1988 VCU Rams baseball game log (45–16–1)
Regular season (41–14–1)

February (1–3)
Date	Opponent	Rank	Stadium	Score	Win	Loss	Save	Attendance	Overall	SBC
February 26	Virginia State*		The Diamond; Richmond, VA	L 4–5					0–1	—
February 26	Virginia State*		The Diamond	W 10–0					1–1	—
February 27	William & Mary*		The Diamond	L 0–2					1–2	—
February 28	George Mason*		The Diamond	L 2–10					1–3	—

March (20–5–1)
Date	Opponent	Rank	Stadium	Score	Win	Loss	Save	Attendance	Overall	SBC
March 1	at Liberty*		Al Worthington Stadium; Lynchburg, VA	W 8–3					2–3	—
March 2	at Atlantic Christian*		Nixon Field; Wilson, NC	W 8–2					3–3	—
March 4	Liberty*		The Diamond	W 9–3					4–3	—
March 6	Providence*		The Diamond	W 4–3					5–3	—
March 6	Providence*		The Diamond	W 3–0					6–3	—
March 7	Christopher Newport*		The Diamond	W 13–2	Zona (2–1)	Holland (0–1)	None	134	7–3	—
March 8	Lock Haven*		The Diamond	W 17–5					8–3	—
March 11	at East Carolina*		Harrington Field; Greenville, NC	W 5–4^{11}					9–3	—
March 12	at NC State*		Doak Field; Raleigh, NC	L 1–19					9–4	—
March 13	Fairfield*		The Diamond	W 5–0					10–4	—
March 14	Vermont*		The Diamond	W 9–6					11–4	—
March 14	Vermont*		The Diamond	L 4–7					11–5	—
March 15	Barton*		The Diamond	W 5–2					12–5	—
March 16	Randolph–Macon*		The Diamond	W 11–6					13–5	—
March 19	at Jacksonville		John Sessions Stadium; Jacksonville, FL	L 4–13					13–6	0–1
March 19	at Jacksonville		John Sessions Stadium	W 8–0					14–6	1–1
March 22	Hartford*		The Diamond	W 8–3					15–6	—
March 23	Duke*		The Diamond	W 11–5					16–6	—
March 24	Nichols*		The Diamond	W 18–1					17–6	—
March 25	Yale*		The Diamond	W 5–0					18–6	—
March 26	at Charlotte		The Diamond	T 1–1^{5}	None	None	None		18–6–1	1–1–1
March 27	Charlotte		The Diamond	W 1–0	—	—	—		19–6–1	2–1–1
March 27	Charlotte		The Diamond	W 10–2	—	—	—		20–6–1	3–1–1
March 29	Mary Washington*		The Diamond	W 12–2					21–6–1	—
March 30	at Virginia Tech*		Tech Park; Blacksburg, VA	L 8–11					21–7–1	—
March 31	at Maryland*		Shipley Field; College Park, MD	L 11–16					21–8–1	—

April (17–4)
Date	Opponent	Rank	Stadium	Score	Win	Loss	Save	Attendance	Overall	SBC
April 1	Old Dominion		The Diamond	W 2–1					22–8–1	4–1–1
April 2	Old Dominion		The Diamond	W 3–0					23–8–1	5–1–1
April 3	Old Dominion		The Diamond	W 9–5					24–8–1	6–1–1
April 5	Longwood*		The Diamond	W 3–1					25–8–1	—
April 9	at James Madison*		Veterans Memorial Park; Harrisonburg, VA	L 13–15^{10}					25–9–1	—
April 10	Jacksonville		The Diamond	W 2–1					26–9–1	7–1–1
April 11	Jacksonville		The Diamond	L 3–4					26–10–1	7–2–1
April 12	Jacksonville		The Diamond	W 7–0					27–10–1	8–2–1
April 14	at George Mason*		Spuhler Field; Fairfax, VA	W 9–2					28–10–1	—
April 15	Virginia Wesleyan*		The Diamond	W 22–0					29–10–1	—
April 16	Virginia State*		The Diamond	W 12–1					30–10–1	—
April 16	Virginia State*		The Diamond	W 14–0					31–10–1	—
April 17	at Virginia Wesleyan*		Kenneth R. Perry Field; Virginia Beach, VA	W 14–5					32–10–1	—
April 20	Richmond*		The Diamond	W 10–1					33–10–1	—
April 23	at Charlotte		Tom and Lib Phillips Field; Charlotte, NC	W 13–1	—	—	—		34–10–1	9–2–1
April 24	at Charlotte		Tom and Lib Phillips Field	W 6–3	—	—	—		35–10–1	10–2–1
April 25	at Charlotte		Tom and Lib Phillips Field	W 4–3	—	—	—		36–10–1	11–2–1
April 27	at Christopher Newport*		Deer Park; Newport News, VA	W 6–4	Morris (?–?)	Parnell (4–6)	Flanagan (?)	105	37–10–1	—
April 29	Wake Forest*		The Diamond	W 4–2					38–10–1	—
April 30	at Old Dominion		Bud Metheny Baseball Complex; Norfolk, VA	L 2–3					38–11–1	11–3–1
April 30	at Old Dominion		Bud Metheny Baseball Complex	L 1–3					38–12–1	11–4–1

May (3–2)
Date	Opponent	Rank	Stadium	Score	Win	Loss	Save	Attendance	Overall	SBC
May 1	at Old Dominion		Bud Metheny Baseball Complex	L 1–2					38–13–1	11–5–1
May 2	Virginia Tech*		The Diamond	W 7–6					39–13–1	—
May 3	NC State*		The Diamond	L 3–11					39–14–1	—
May 4	at North Carolina*		Boshamer Stadium; Chapel Hill, NC	W 4–2^{7}					40–14–1	—
May 7	at Richmond*		Malcolm U. Pitt Field; Tuckahoe, VA	W 2–1					41–14–1	—

Postseason (4–2)

Sun Belt Tournament (4–0)
Date	Opponent	Rank	Stadium	Score	Win	Loss	Save	Attendance	Overall	SBCT
May 18	vs. (W3) South Florida	(E1)	Nick Denes Field; Bowling Green, KY	W 11–10					42–14–1	1–0
May 19	vs. (E3) Charlotte	(E1)	Nick Denes Field	W 9–0					43–14–1	2–0
May 20	at (W1) Western Kentucky	(E1)	Nick Denes Field	W 4–3					44–14–1	3–0
May 21	vs. (E2) Jacksonville	(E1)	Nick Denes Field	W 7–4					45–14–1	4–0

NCAA Atlantic Regional (0–2)
Date	Opponent	Rank	Stadium	Score	Win	Loss	Save	Attendance	Overall	NCAAT
May 25	vs. (2) Georgia Tech*	(5)	Mark Light Field; Coral Gables, FL	L 6–9					45–15–1	0–1
May 26	vs. (6) Towson*	(5)	Mark Light Field	L 2–4					45–16–1	0–2

Legend: = Win = Loss = Tie = Canceled
Bold =VCU team member
Rankings are based on the team's current ranking in the D1Baseball poll.

== Awards and honors ==
Sun Belt Conference Weekly Awards
Player	Award	Date Awarded	Ref.
Billy Wright	Player of the Week	March 27, 1988	

All-SBC
Player	Position	Team
John Callis	OF	1
Jerry Dipoto	RHP	1
