= 1979 NAIA World Series =

1979 NAIA baseball tournament
- 1979 NAIA World Series
- Teams: 8
- Format: Double elimination Page playoff
- Finals site: Herschel Greer Stadium; Nashville, Tennessee
- Champions: David Lipscomb (2nd title)
- Winning coach: Ken Dugan
- MVP: Kal Koenig (P) (David Lipscomb)

The 1979 NAIA World Series was the 23rd annual tournament hosted by the National Association of Intercollegiate Athletics to determine the national champion of baseball among its member colleges and universities in the United States and Canada.

The tournament was played, for the first time, at Herschel Greer Stadium in Nashville, Tennessee.

Hometown team David Lipscomb (43–11) defeated High Point (38-15-1) in a single-game championship series, 5–4, to win the Bisons' second NAIA World Series and second in three years.

David Lipscomb pitcher Kal Koenig was named tournament MVP.

== Bracket ==
First Round
Lewis–Clark State	1
Wisconsin–La Crosse	2
David Lipscomb	3
Saint Xavier	2
Point Park	3
SE Oklahoma State	4
Birmingham–Southern	2
High Point	3

Second Round
Wisconsin–La Crosse	2
David Lipscomb	12
SE Oklahoma State	8
High Point	9
Consolation First Round
Point Park	5
Birmingham-Southern	3
Lewis–Clark State	1
Saint Xavier	7

Third Round
David Lipscomb	6
High Point	3
Consolation Second Round
Wisconsin–La Crosse	4
Point Park	8
SE Oklahoma State	3
Saint Xavier	4

Semifinals
David Lipscomb	2
Point Park	3
High Point	4
Saint Xavier	2

Elimination final
Point Park	6
High Point	10

Championship
David Lipscomb	5
High Point	4

== See also ==
- 1979 NCAA Division I baseball tournament
- 1979 NCAA Division II baseball tournament
- 1979 NCAA Division III baseball tournament
