= 1985 NCAA Division II softball tournament =

- Format: Double-elimination tournament
- Finals site: Northridge, California
- Champions: Cal State Northridge (3rd title)
- Runner-up: Akron (2nd title game)
- Winning coach: Gary Torgeson (3rd title)
- Attendance: 3,028

The 1985 NCAA Division II softball tournament was the fourth annual postseason tournament hosted by the NCAA to determine the national champion of softball among its Division II members in the United States, held at the end of the 1985 NCAA Division II softball season.

The final, four-team double elimination tournament, also known as the Division II Women's College World Series, was played at California State University, Northridge in Northridge, California.

In a rematch of the previous year's final, defending champions Cal State Northridge defeated Akron in the double elimination game of the championship series, 2–1, to capture the Matadors' third Division II national title.

== Bracket ==
=== Finals ===
First Round
Akron	0
Cal State Northridge	3
Winner's bracket
Stephen F. Austin	2
Sacred Heart	0
Akron	2^{(9)}
Sacred Heart	0
Loser's bracket

Semifinals
Cal State Northridge	2
Stephen F. Austin	0
Stephen F. Austin	0
Akron	4

Championship
Cal State Northridge	1	2
Akron	2^{(15)}	1

== All-tournament team ==
- Dee Dee Baddelley, 1B, Cal State Northridge
- Lisa Arvay, 2B, Akron
- Linda Lowande, SS, Cal State Northridge
- Michelle McAnany, 3B, Cal State Northridge
- Barbara Jordan, OF, Cal State Northridge
- Terri Lamoree, OF, Cal State Northridge
- Kathy Walker, OF, Stephen F. Austin
- Renee Vance, P, Akron
- Kathy Slaten, P, Cal State Northridge
- Stacy Lim, C, Cal State Northridge
- Kay Piper, UT, Akron
- Tracy Alcorn, UT, Akron

== See also ==
- 1985 NCAA Division I softball tournament
- 1985 NCAA Division III softball tournament
- 1985 NAIA softball tournament
- 1985 NCAA Division II baseball tournament
