= 1977 NAIA World Series =

1977 NAIA baseball tournament
- 1977 NAIA World Series
- Teams: 8
- Format: Double elimination Page playoff
- Finals site: Phil Welch Stadium; St. Joseph, Missouri
- Champions: David Lipscomb (1st title)
- Winning coach: Ken Dugan
- MVP: Steve Fletcher (P/DH/1B) (David Lipscomb)

The 1977 NAIA World Series was the 21st annual tournament hosted by the National Association of Intercollegiate Athletics to determine the national champion of baseball among its member colleges and universities in the United States and Canada.

The tournament was again played at Phil Welch Stadium in St. Joseph, Missouri.

David Lipscomb (47–12) defeated Southeastern Oklahoma State (56–8) in a single-game championship series, 2–1, to win the Bisons' first NAIA World Series. For the first time in event history, both teams reached the final despite having lost a game earlier in the tournament.

David Lipscomb pitcher/first-baseman/designated hitter Steve Fletcher was named tournament MVP.

== Bracket ==
Upper round 1
Newberry	0
SE Oklahoma State	13
David Lipscomb	1
La Verne	11
Lubbock Christian	17
Monmouth (NJ)	2
Lewis (IL)	13
William Jewell	2

Upper round 2
SE Oklahoma State	1
La Verne	7
Lubbock Christian	0
Lewis	5
Lower round 1
Monmouth	2
William Jewell	6
Newberry	3
David Lipscomb	8

Upper final
La Verne	11
Lewis	3
Lower round 2
SE Oklahoma State	10
William Jewell	3
Lubbock Christian	1
David Lipscomb	7

Semifinals
La Verne	2
David Lipscomb	4
Lewis	5
SE Oklahoma State	6

Preliminary final
La Verne	7
SE Oklahoma State	8

Final
David Lipscomb	2
SE Oklahoma State	1

== See also ==
- 1977 NCAA Division I baseball tournament
- 1977 NCAA Division II baseball tournament
- 1977 NCAA Division III baseball tournament
