= 1980 NAIA World Series =

1980 NAIA baseball tournament
- 1980 NAIA World Series
- Teams: 10
- Format: Double elimination Page playoff
- Finals site: Herschel Greer Stadium; Nashville, Tennessee
- Champions: Grand Canyon (1st title)
- Winning coach: Dave Brazelle
- MVP: Jim Gerlach (P) (Grand Canyon)

The 1980 NAIA World Series was the 24th annual tournament hosted by the National Association of Intercollegiate Athletics to determine the national champion of baseball among its member colleges and universities in the United States and Canada.

The tournament was played at Herschel Greer Stadium in Nashville, Tennessee.

Grand Canyon (56-14-2) defeated Lewis (IL) (61–24) in a single-game championship series, 5–4, to win the Antelopes' first NAIA World Series.

Grand Canyon pitcher Jim Gerlach was named tournament MVP.

== Bracket ==
First round
Grand Canyon	9
Lewis–Clark State	2
David Lipscomb	0
USC Coastal Carolina	3
Consolation First Round
John Brown	2
David Lipscomb	3
SE Oklahoma State	4
Lewis–Clark State	8

Second round
Lubbock Christian	0
Grand Canyon	6
SE Oklahoma State	5
William Jewell	11
Point Park	1
USC Coastal Carolina	4
John Brown	4
Lewis (IL)	7
Consolation Second Round
Lubbock Christian	8
David Lipscomb	5
Point Park	7
Lewis–Clark State	12

Third round
Grand Canyon	3
William Jewell	0
USC Coastal Carolina	3
Lewis	7
Consolation Third Round
William Jewell	4
Lubbock Christian	10
USC Coastal Carolina	2
Lewis–Clark State	4

Fourth round Both teams to championship bracket
Grand Canyon	2
Lewis	1

Semifinals
Grand Canyon	9
Lewis–Clark State	4
Lewis	7
Lubbock Christian	2

Championship
Grand Canyon	5
Lewis	4

== See also ==
- 1980 NCAA Division I baseball tournament
- 1980 NCAA Division II baseball tournament
- 1980 NCAA Division III baseball tournament
