= 1983 NCAA Division II softball tournament =

- Format: Double-elimination tournament
- Finals site: Orange, California
- Champions: Cal State Northridge (1st title)
- Runner-up: Sam Houston State (2nd title game)
- Winning coach: Gary Torgeson (1st title)
- Attendance: 1,294

The 1983 NCAA Division II softball tournament was the second annual postseason tournament hosted by the NCAA to determine the national champion of softball among its Division II members in the United States, held at the end of the 1982 NCAA Division II softball season.

The final, four-team double elimination tournament, also known as the Division II Women's College World Series, was played in Orange, California.

In a rematch of the previous year's final, Cal State Northridge defeated defending champions Sam Houston State in the championship game, 1–0, to capture the Matadors' first Division II national title.

== Bracket ==
=== Finals ===
First Round
Sam Houston State | 0
Cal State Northridge | 1
Winner's bracket
Sacred Heart | 0
Stephen F. Austin | 5
Sam Houston State | 3
Sacred Heart | 1
Loser's bracket

Semifinals
Cal State Northridge | 4
Stephen F. Austin | 0
Stephen F. Austin | 2
Sam Houston State | 3

Championship
Cal State Northridge | 1
Sam Houston State | 0

== All-tournament team ==
- Ginger Cannon, 1B, Sam Houston State
- Pat Mulcahey, 2B, Sam Houston State
- Kathy Toerner, SS, Cal State Northridge
- Renee Smith, 3B, Stephen F. Austin
- Terri Lamoree, OF, Cal State Northridge
- Beth Smith, OF, Sam Houston State
- Linda Lowande, OF, Cal State Northridge
- Kathy Slaten, P, Cal State Northridge
- Kathy Phillips, P, Sam Houston State
- Lisa Busby, C, Sam Houston State
- Stacy Lim, UT, Cal State Northridge
- Mary Baskin, UT, Sam Houston State

== See also ==
- 1983 NCAA Division I softball tournament
- 1983 NCAA Division III softball tournament
- 1983 NAIA softball tournament
- 1983 NCAA Division II baseball tournament
