= 1977 NCAA Division III baseball tournament =

- Season: 1977
- Teams: 22
- Finals site: Pioneer Park; Marietta, Ohio, U.S.
- Champions: Stanislaus State (2nd title)
- Runner-up: Brandeis
- MOP: Rusty Kuntz (Stanislaus State)

The 1977 NCAA Division III baseball tournament was played at the end of the 1977 NCAA Division III baseball season to determine the second national champion of college baseball at the NCAA Division III level. The tournament concluded with four teams competing at Pioneer Park in Marietta, Ohio, for the championship. Four regional tournaments were held to determine the participants in the World Series. Regional tournaments were contested in double-elimination format, with three regions consisting of six teams and one consisting of four, for a total of 22 teams participating in the tournament. The tournament champion was Stanislaus State, who defeated Brandeis for the championship.

== Bids ==
The 22 competing teams were:

| School | Nickname | Location | Conference | Tournament appearance | Last appearance | Consecutive tournament appearances | Previous best performance |
|---|---|---|---|---|---|---|---|
| Brandeis University | Judges | Waltham, MA | Independent | 2nd | 1976 | 2 | Regional Runner-Up (1976) |
| Coe College | Kohawks | Cedar Rapids, IA | Midwest Collegiate Athletic Conference | 1st | Debut | 1 | Debut |
| DePauw University | Tigers | Greencastle, IN | Independent/Indiana Collegiate Conference(NCAA D-II) | 1st | Debut | 1 | Debut |
| Eastern Connecticut State College | Warriors | Willimantic, CT | Independent | 2nd | 1976 | 2 | Regional third place (1976) |
| Glassboro State College | Profs | Glassboro, NJ | New Jersey State Athletic Conference | 2nd | 1976 | 2 | Regional Runner-Up (1976) |
| Ithaca College | Bombers | Ithaca, NY | Inedependent College Athletic Conference | 2nd | 1976 | 2 | World Series Runner-Up (1976) |
| Lawrence University | Vikings | Appleton, WI | Midwest Collegiate Athletic Conference | 1st | Debut | 1 | Debut |
| Lynchburg College | Hornets | Lynchburg, VA | Old Dominion Athletic Conference | 2nd | 1976 | 2 | Regional Fifth place (1976) |
| Marietta College | Pioneers | Marietta, OH | Ohio Athletic Conference | 2nd | 1976 | 2 | Regional Fifth place (1976) |
| Maryville College | Scots | Maryville, TN | Independent | 1st | Debut | 1 | Debut |
| Methodist College | Monarchs | Fayetteville, NC | Dixie Intercollegiate Athletic Conference | 2nd | 1976 | 2 | Regional Fifth place (1976) |
| North Adams State College | Mohawks | North Adams, MA | Massachusetts State Collegiate Athletic Conference | 2nd | 1976 | 2 | Regional Fifth place (1976) |
| Pace University | Setters | New York City, NY | Knickerbocker Conference | 1st | Debut | 1 | Debut |
| Salisbury State College | Sea Gulls | Salisbury, MD | Independent/Mason-Dixon Conference(NCAA D-II) | 1st | Debut | 1 | Debut |
| St. Olaf College | Oles | Northfield, MN | Minnesota Intercollegiate Athletic Conference | 1st | Debut | 1 | Debut |
| Stanislaus State College | Warriors | Turlock, CA | Independent | 2nd | 1976 | 2 | National Champion (1976) |
| Westfield State College | Owls | Westfield, MA | Massachusetts State Collegiate Athletic Conference | 2nd | 1976 | 2 | Regional Fifth place (1976) |
| Widener College | Pioneers | Chester, PA | Middle Atlantic States Collegiate Athletic Conference | 2nd | 1976 | 2 | Regional Fifth place (1976) |
| Wilkes College | Colonels | Wilkes-Barre, PA | Middle Atlantic States Collegiate Athletic Conference | 2nd | 1976 | 2 | World Series Fourth place (1976) |
| William Paterson University of New Jersey | Pioneers | Wayne Township, NJ | New Jersey State Athletic Conference | 1st | Debut | 1 | Debut |
| The College of Wooster | Fighting Scots | Wooster, OH | Ohio Athletic Conference | 1st | Debut | 1 | Debut |
| York College of Pennsylvania | Spartans | York, PA | Independent | 1st | Debut | 1 | Debut |

== Regionals ==
Bold indicates winner.

=== South Regional ===
First round
1 | **Glassboro State** | **4**
6 | Lynchburg | 2
2 | **William Paterson** | **2**
5 | Methodist | 0
3 | **Salisbury State** | **25**
4 | Maryville (TN) | 4

Second round/elimination round 1
**Glassboro State** | **12**
Maryville (TN) | 1
William Paterson | 3
**Salisbury State** | **10**
**Lynchburg** | **2**
Methodist | 0

Semifinals/elimination round 2
**Glassboro State** | **5**
Salisbury State | 2
William Paterson | 5
**Lynchburg** | **6**

Elimination final
Salisbury State | 2
**Lynchburg** | **5**

Final
**Glassboro State** | **11** | --
Lynchburg | 5 | --

=== Northeast Regional ===
First round
1 | **Brandeis** | **3**
6 | Pace | 2
2 | **Westfield State** | **16**
5 | North Adams State | 13
3 | **Eastern Connecticut State** | **9**
4 | Ithaca | 6

Second round/elimination round 1
Brandeis | 4
**Ithaca** | **5**
Pace | 3
**North Adams State** | **12**
**Westfield State** | **10**
Eastern Connecticut State | 9
**Brandeis** | **10**
Eastern Connecticut State | 5

Third round/elimination round 2
**Ithaca** | **7**
North Adams State | 1
Westfield State | 6
**Brandeis** | **11**

Elimination final
Ithaca | 7
**Westfield State** | **12**

Final
Westfield State | 3
**Brandeis** | **5**

=== West Regional ===
First round/elimination first round
**Stanislaus State** | **20**
Coe | 2
**St. Olaf** | **8**
Lawrence | 1
Lower round 1
**Coe** | **6**
Lawrence | 0

Semifinal/elimination final
**Stanislaus State** | **10**
St. Olaf | 4
Lower final
St. Olaf | 0
**Coe** | **8**

Final
**Stanislaus State** | **22** | --
Coe | 1 | --

=== Mideast Regional ===
First round
1 | **DePauw** | **9**
6 | Widener | 6
2 | **Marietta** | **4**
5 | Wilkes | 1
3 | **York (PA)** | **5**
4 | Wooster | 1

Second round/elimination round 1
DePauw | 1
**Wooster** | **5**
**Widener** | **10**
Wilkes | 9
**Marietta** | **10**
York (PA) | 1
**DePauw** | **12**
York (PA) | 6

Semifinals
Wooster | 9
**Widener** | **12**
**Marietta** | **13**
DePauw | 4

Final
Widener | **7** | 2
**Marietta** | 1 | **3**

== World Series ==
=== Participants ===
| School | Nickname | Location | Conference | World Series appearance | Last appearance | Consecutive World Series appearances | Previous best performance |
|---|---|---|---|---|---|---|---|
| Stanislaus State College | Warriors | Turlock, CA | Independent | 2nd | 1976 | 2 | National Champion (1976) |
| Brandeis University | Judges | Waltham, MA | Independent | 1st | Debut | 1 | Debut |
| Glassboro State College | Profs | Glassboro, NJ | New Jersey State Athletic Conference | 1st | Debut | 1 | Debut |
| Marietta College | Pioneers | Marietta, OH | Ohio Athletic Conference | 1st | Debut | 1 | Debut |

=== Bracket ===
Pioneer Park-Marietta, OH (Host: Marietta College)

First round/elimination first round
Glassboro State | 11
Brandeis | 3
Stanislaus State | 5
Marietta | 3
Lower round 1
Brandeis | 11
Marietta | 9

Semifinal/elimination final
Glassboro State | 1
Stanislaus State | 14
Lower final
Glassboro State | 10
Brandeis | 13

Final
Stanislaus State | 8 | –
Brandeis | 5 | –

== See also ==
- 1977 NCAA Division I baseball tournament
- 1977 NCAA Division II baseball tournament
- 1977 NAIA World Series
