= Dean Bowyer =

American baseball coach

Dean Bowyer is an American former college baseball coach. He was the head coach for the Minot State Beavers from 1973 to 1976 and the Minnesota State Mavericks 1977 to 2008.

== Coaching career ==
Bowyer won 1,053 games in his 34 years of coaching, putting him eighth-winningest NCAA Division II baseball coach of all time. He has also taken his teams to the 1979 Division II College World Series, 1980 Division II College World Series, 1986 Division II College World Series and 2010 Division II College World Series.

After leaving the Minnesota State Mavericks, Bowyer worked as an assistant coach for the Augustana Vikings on a volunteer basis. In 2017, Minnesota State University, Mankato named its baseball field after Bowyer.
