= Tommy Thomas (baseball coach) =

American baseball coach

Tommy Thomas was the head coach of the Valdosta State University baseball team from 1967 to 2007, leading the team to 34 winning seasons. He had a managerial record of 1,328-825-6, and headed the team to the national tournament eight times, Gulf South Conference titles in 1995 and 2002, division titles in 1983, 2001 and 2003 and a Division II national title in 1979. The 1979 national title was the school's first of any kind. He was the first and only Division II coach to reach 1,200 wins.

In 2016, Thomas was inducted into the National College Baseball Hall of Fame.

Major league baseball players Sam Bowen, Jason Bulger, and Scott MacRae all played under his tutelage.

== See also ==
- List of college baseball career coaching wins leaders
