= John Scolinos =

American baseball coach

Biographical details
- Born: March 28, 1918; Los Angeles, California, U.S.
- Died: November 7, 2009 (aged 91)

Playing career

Baseball
- 1937: Osceola Indians
- 1938: Corpus Christi Spudders
- 1939: Palestine Pals
- 1939: St. Joseph Angels
- 1939: Topeka Owls
- 1941: Riverside Reds
- 1941: Anaheim Aces
- 1941: Merced Bears
- Position: First baseman

Coaching career (HC unless noted)

Football
- 1955–1959: Pepperdine

Baseball
- 1946–1960: Pepperdine
- 1962–1991: Cal Poly Pomona

Head coaching record
- Overall: 17–26–1 (football); 1,070–954–13 (baseball)

Accomplishments and honors

Championships
- Baseball; 3 NCAA Division II (1976, 1980, 1983)

John Harry Scolinos (March 28, 1918 – November 7, 2009) was an American football and baseball coach. He was the head baseball coach at Pepperdine University from 1946 to 1960 and at California State Polytechnic University Pomona from 1962 to 1991, compiling career college baseball record of 1,070–954–13. Scolinos was also the head football coach at Pepperdine from 1955 to 1959, tallying a mark of 17–26–1.

Scolinos was born in Los Angeles. He died at age 91 in November 2009.

== Coaching career ==
Scolinos totaled 1,198 victories. While coaching Cal Poly Pomona, he won NCAA Division II national championships in 1976, 1980 and 1983, along with six California Collegiate Athletic Association championships and was named Division II coach of the year three times.

He was inducted into the American Association of Collegiate Baseball Coaches Hall of Fame in 1974.

== Olympics ==
Scolinos was the pitching coach for the 1984 U.S. Olympic Baseball team which finished second behind Japan, losing 6–3 in the final game.

== Head coaching record ==
=== Football ===
Year	Team	Overall	Conference	Standing	Bowl/playoffs
Pepperdine Waves (Independent) (1955–1959)
1955	Pepperdine	5–5			
1956	Pepperdine	6–3			
1957	Pepperdine	3–6			
1958	Pepperdine	1–7			
1959	Pepperdine	2–5–1			
Pepperdine:		17–26–1			
Total:		17–26–1			
