= 1976 NCAA Division III baseball tournament =

- Season: 1976
- Teams: 22
- Finals site: Pioneer Park; Marietta, Ohio, U.S.
- Champions: Stanislaus State (1st title)
- Runner-up: Ithaca

The 1976 NCAA Division III baseball tournament was played at the end of the 1976 NCAA Division III baseball season to determine the first national champion of college baseball at the NCAA Division III level. The tournament concluded with four teams competing at Pioneer Park in Marietta, Ohio, for the championship. Four regional tournaments were held to determine the participants in the World Series. Regional tournaments were contested in double-elimination format, with three regions consisting of six teams and one consisting of four, for a total of 22 teams participating in the tournament. The tournament champion was Stanislaus State, who defeated Ithaca for the championship.

== Bids ==
The 22 competing teams were:

School	Nickname	Location	Conference	Tournament appearance	Last appearance	Consecutive tournament appearances	Previous best performance
Ashland College	Eagles	Ashland, OH	Independent	1st	Debut	1	Debut
Brandeis University	Judges	Waltham, MA	Independent	1st	Debut	1	Debut
Eastern Connecticut State College	Warriors	Willimantic, CT	Independent	1st	Debut	1	Debut
Glassboro State College	Profs	Glassboro, NJ	New Jersey State Athletic Conference	1st	Debut	1	Debut
Ithaca College	Bombers	Ithaca, NY	Inedependent College Athletic Conference	1st	Debut	1	Debut
Johns Hopkins University	Blue Jays	Baltimore, MD	Independent	1st	Debut	1	Debut
Lynchburg College	Hornets	Lynchburg, VA	Dixie Intercollegiate Athletic Conference	1st	Debut	1	Debut
Mansfield State College	Mountaineers	Mansfield, PA	Independent/Pennsylvania State Athletic Conference(NCAA D-II)	1st	Debut	1	Debut
Marietta College	Pioneers	Marietta, OH	Ohio Athletic Conference	1st	Debut	1	Debut
Methodist College	Monarchs	Fayetteville, NC	Dixie Intercollegiate Athletic Conference	1st	Debut	1	Debut
Monmouth College	Fighting Scots	Monmouth, IL	Midwest Collegiate Athletic Conference	1st	Debut	1	Debut
Montclair State College	Indians	Montclair, NJ	New Jersey State Athletic Conference	1st	Debut	1	Debut
Nebraska Wesleyan University	Plainsmen	Lincoln, NE	Independent/Nebraska Intercollegiate Athletic Conference(NAIA)	1st	Debut	1	Debut
North Adams State College	Mohawks	North Adams, MA	Massachusetts State Collegiate Athletic Conference	1st	Debut	1	Debut
Ohio Northern University	Polar Bears	Ada, OH	Ohio Athletic Conference	1st	Debut	1	Debut
Queens College	Knights	New York City, NY (Queens)	Knickerbocker Conference	1st	Debut	1	Debut
Stanislaus State College	Warriors	Turlock, CA	Independent	1st	Debut	1	Debut
Upsala College	Vikings	East Orange, NJ	Middle Atlantic States Collegiate Athletic Conference	1st	Debut	1	Debut
Westfield State College	Owls	Westfield, MA	Massachusetts State Collegiate Athletic Conference	1st	Debut	1	Debut
Westmont College	Warriors	Montecito, CA	Independent	1st	Debut	1	Debut
Widener College	Pioneers	Chester, PA	Middle Atlantic States Collegiate Athletic Conference	1st	Debut	1	Debut
Wilkes College	Colonels	Wilkes-Barre, PA	Middle Atlantic States Collegiate Athletic Conference	1st	Debut	1	Debut

== Regionals ==
Bold indicates winner.

=== West Regional ===
First Round:

Turlock, CA (Host: Stanislaus State College)

Team	1	2	3
**Stanislaus State**	3	**5**	**10**
Westmont	**7**^{10}	2	9^{10}

Sherman Field-Monmouth, IL (Host: Monmouth College)

Team	1	2	3
**Monmouth (IL)**	**8**	5	**8**
Nebraska Wesleyan	6	**8**	7^{10}

Final:

Team	1	2	3
**Stanislaus State**	**13**	**7**	--
Monmouth (IL)	10	3	--

=== Northeast Regional ===
First round
1	**Eastern Connecticut State**	**2**
6	Queens	0
2	**Ithaca**	**10**
5	Westfield State	5
3	**Brandeis**	**10**
4	North Adams State	9

Second round/elimination round 1
**Eastern Connecticut State**	**4**
North Adams State	2
**Ithaca**	**13**
Brandeis	6
**Queens**	**10**
Westfield State	7

Semifinals/elimination round 2
Eastern Connecticut State	1
**Ithaca**	**3**
**Brandeis**	**6**
Queens	4

Elimination final
Eastern Connecticut State	2
**Brandeis**	**4**

Final
**Ithaca**	**10**	--
Brandeis	3	--

=== South Regional ===
First round
1	**Montclair State**	**14**
6	Glassboro State	10
2	**Johns Hopkins**	**4**
5	Lynchburg	3^{10}
3	**Upsala**	**5**
4	Methodist	4^{11}

Second round/elimination round 1
**Montclair State**	**9**
Lynchburg	5
Johns Hopkins	0
**Upsala**	**13**
**Glassboro State**	**7**
Methodist	5

Semifinals/elimination round 2
**Montclair State**	**4**
Upsala	2
Johns Hopkins	0
**Glassboro State**	**6**

Elimination final
Upsala	1
**Glassboro State**	**8**

Final
**Montclair State**	4	**8**
Glassboro State	**6**	1

=== Mideast Regional ===
First round
1	**Ashland**	**5**
6	Widener	2
2	**Mansfield State**	**8**
5	Ohio Northern	6
3	**Wilkes**	**6**
4	Marietta	3

Second round/elimination round 1
**Ashland**	**7**
Marietta	4
Mansfield State	6
**Wilkes**	**8**^{10}
Widener	1
**Ohio Northern**	**3**

Semifinals/elimination round 2
Ashland	7
**Wilkes**	**13**
**Mansfield State**	**10**
Ohio Northern	4

Elimination final
Ashland	4
**Mansfield State**	**14**

Final
**Wilkes**	6	**11**
Mansfield State	**7**	0

== World Series ==
=== Participants ===
School	Nickname	Location	Conference	World Series appearance	Last appearance	Consecutive World Series appearances	Previous best performance
Stanislaus State College	Warriors	Turlock, CA	Independent	1st	Debut	1	Debut
Ithaca College	Bombers	Ithaca, NY	Inedependent College Athletic Conference	1st	Debut	1	Debut
Montclair State College	Indians	Montclair, NJ	New Jersey State Athletic Conference	1st	Debut	1	Debut
Wilkes College	Colonels	Wilkes-Barre, PA	Middle Atlantic States Collegiate Athletic Conference	1st	Debut	1	Debut

=== Bracket ===
Pioneer Park-Marietta, OH (Host: Marietta College)

First round/elimination first round
Stanislaus State	5
Ithaca	4
Montclair State	2
Wilkes	1
Lower round 1
Ithaca	16
Wilkes	3

Semifinal/elimination final
Stanislaus State	10
Montclair State	9
Lower final
Montclair State	5
Ithaca	10

Final
Stanislaus State	13	–
Ithaca	6	–

== See also ==
- 1976 NCAA Division I baseball tournament
- 1976 NCAA Division II baseball tournament
- 1976 NAIA World Series
