= Brandeis Judges =

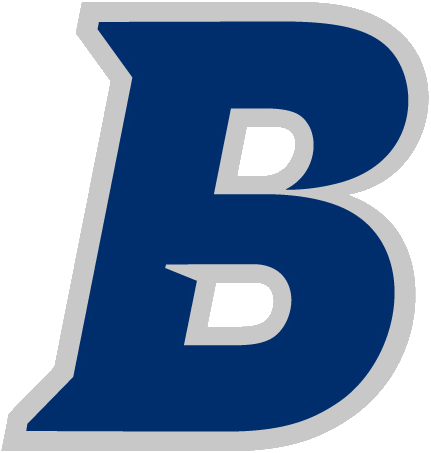
- University: Brandeis University
- Nickname: Judges
- NCAA: Division III
- Conference: UAA, ECAC
- Athletic director: Lauren Haynie
- Location: Waltham, Massachusetts
- Basketball arena: Red Auerbach Arena at Gosman Sports and Convocation Center
- Baseball stadium: Stein Diamond
- Softball stadium: Marcus Field
- Soccer stadium: Gordon Field and Outdoor Track
- Aquatics center: Linsey Pool
- Tennis venue: Cordish Tennis Center
- Outdoor track and field venue: Gordon Field and Outdoor Track
- Volleyball arena: Red Auerbach Arena
- Colors: White and Blue
- Mascot: The Judge and Ollie the Owl
- Website: brandeisjudges.com
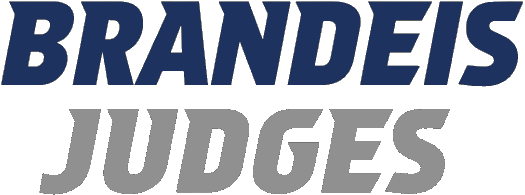

The Brandeis Judges are 17 intercollegiate sports teams that represent Brandeis University. They compete in the NCAA's Division III in the University Athletic Association conference, which they joined in May 1987. The team colors are blue and white, and their mascots are The Judge and Ollie the Owl.

The centerpiece of Brandeis athletics is the Joseph P. and Clara Ford Athletic and Recreation Complex, one of the largest and best-equipped, multipurpose, indoor athletic facilities in the Northeast.

Benny Friedman, who was enshrined in the Pro Football Hall of Fame in 2005, served as Athletic Director from 1949 to 1963 and as head football coach from 1951 to 1960, when the football team was disbanded due to high costs. Bud Collins coached the men's tennis team from 1959 to 1963. Chris Ford (2001–03) was the third former Boston Celtics player to become head coach at Brandeis, following Bob Brannum (1970–86) and K.C. Jones (1967–70). The basketball and volleyball teams play in the Red Auerbach Arena at the Gosman Sports and Convocation Center. The arena is named after the legendary Boston Celtics coach.

== Athletics ==
Men's sports	Women's sports
Baseball	Basketball
Basketball	Cross country
Cross country	Fencing
Fencing	Soccer
Soccer	Softball
Swimming and diving	Swimming and diving
Tennis	Tennis
Track and field (Note: indoor and outdoor.)	Track and field
	Volleyball

=== Baseball ===
Brandeis' baseball team advanced to the Division III championship game in 1977, although they lost to Stanislaus State.

Former head coach Pete Varney, who played Major League Baseball for the Chicago White Sox and Atlanta Braves, retired after 34 years of coaching. Derek Carlson, former player and assistant coach under Pete Varney, is the current head coach of the Brandeis Varsity Baseball program. Pitcher Nelson Figueroa is the first Brandeis graduate to play in Major League Baseball.

=== Basketball (men's) ===
The men's basketball team is routinely one of the most competitive Division III teams in the country. The Judges reached four-straight NCAA Tournaments between 2006 and 2010, including Elite 8 teams in 2008 and 2010. Several former players have gone on to play professionally. Three former NBA Boston Celtics players have coached basketball at Brandeis – KC Jones (67–70), Bob Brannum (70–86) and Chris Ford (2001–2003).

=== Cross country ===
The cross country team is one of two teams in Brandeis history to win a Division III National Championship, taking home the crown in 1983. The squad is currently coached by Sinead Evans, who competed in the 1996 and 2000 Olympics in the 1500-meter. The 2009 men's cross country team saw junior Paul Norton earn All-American status at the NCAA Division III National Cross Country Meet, the best performance by a male cross country athlete in over a decade.

=== Fencing ===
Tim Morehouse ('00) won a silver medal at the 2008 Olympics in Men's team saber in Beijing, China. Brandeis consistently sends several fencers to the NCAA National Championships. Brandeis hosted the NCAA Fencing Championships in 1999, 2004, and 2016.

In 2024, saber athlete Maggie Shealy M'25 became "the first woman in school history to win a National Championship in a Division I field, the school’s first individual champion in any sport since 2019, the highest placing fencer in school history, and the second woman in NCAA history to win a fencing championship for a Division III school."

=== Soccer (men's) ===
The men's soccer team won the 1976 NCAA Division III National Championship and has reached the NCAA Division III Tournament 15 times.

In 2012, the team won a share of the UAA title, its first in history, and returned to NCAAs after a 27-year absence, advancing to the Sweet 16 before losing to Williams College. The team ended that year ranked third in New England (behind Williams and Amherst College) and No. 13 in Division III.

In 2013, the Judges again qualified for NCAAs, ending the year ranked No. 15 in Division III, again losing to Williams in the Sweet 16.

In 2014, Brandeis was selected to participate in NCAAs for the third year in a row. The Judges had their best season in recent memory, finishing No. 6 in Division III after advancing to the Elite Eight. Along the way, the Judges defeated eventual NCAA Division III National Champion Tufts University of the NESCAC, 2–0, in the regular season, as well as NESCAC teams Bowdoin College, 1–0, and Amherst, on penalty kick s, in the NCAA Tournament.

The 2015 Brandeis squad won the University Athletic Association title, its second in history and first outright triumph. In the NCAA Tournament, the team then defeated Thomas College 2–1 in the 1st Round and then downed Rensselaer Polytechnic Institute in double-overtime by the same scoreline in the 2nd Round before falling to Trinity University (Texas) in the Sweet 16 by a score of 2–0.

In 2016, Brandeis advanced to its first Final 4 since 1976, downing Amherst on PKs once again in the Sweet 16 after a 1–1 draw, and Rutgers-Newark, 4–2, in the Elite 8. The team fell 1–0 to Calvin in the Final 4. Following the loss, veteran head coach Michael Coven, who was with the team for 44 seasons, announced his retirement, and was replaced by Gabe Margolis.

After losing its opening game in 2017, the Judges won 12 of their next 16 to finish the regular season 14–4, second in the UAA. After defeating Western Connecticut in the 1st Round, 3–0, and Rutgers-Newark in the 2nd Round, 1–0, the squad moved on to the Sweet 16, where it beat previously undefeated Drew University, 1–0, setting up an Elite 8 match with defending national champion Tufts University, a team that the Judges had lost to in the regular season. In this match-up, however, Brandeis beat host Tufts, 1–0, in double-overtime, enabling the Judges to move on to their second Final 4 in as many years, and their first Final 4 under Margolis. In the national semifinal, the Judges fell to eventual champion Messiah College, 3–2, in double-overtime, bringing the program's season to a close at 17–5.

The squad also won the ECAC Championship in the 2006, 2010, and 2011 seasons.

=== Soccer (women's) ===
The women's soccer team won its first Eastern Collegiate Athletic Conference Championship in 2008. Since then, the squad qualified for the NCAA Division III Tournament three times, in 2010, 2012, and 2016. In 2012, the team advanced to the Elite Eight and finished the season ranked the top Division III program in New England and No. 8 in Division III. In 2016, the team advanced to the Division III final four.

=== Softball ===
The softball team has qualified for eight-straight postseason tournaments, including its first-ever NCAA Tournament appearance in 2010.

=== Track and Field ===
At the Division III championship, Eleena Zhelezov became the first person in NCAA history to win four consecutive triple jump titles.

=== Football ===
Brandeis' football team played its first game on September 30, 1950, a road win against Maine Maritime Academy. Their first varsity game was on September 29, 1951, with a home loss against the University of New Hampshire. Its first varsity win was a score of 24–13, an away game at Hofstra University on October 6, 1951. The team won four of nine games during its first season. Brandeis Stadium opened in time for a home win against American International College on October 13, 1951.

On May 16, 1960, Brandeis announced it would discontinue its varsity football team. President Abram Sachar pointed to the cost of the team as one reason for the decision. Brandeis' football coach Benny Friedman said it was difficult to recruit football players who were also excellent students with so much competition in the Boston metropolitan area. Brandeis said the discontinuation of varsity football would allow it to expand intercollegiate activity in other sports.

During its nine years of varsity play, Brandeis' football team recorded 34 wins, 33 losses, and four ties.

== Facilities ==
The Gosman Sports and Recreation Center is the main athletic center on campus and includes indoor and outdoor facilities for the sports offered at the university. Since the building opened in 1991, the university has hosted four NCAA championships. The Gosman Center also served as the pre-season training home and practice facility of the Boston Celtics between 1991 and 1999.

== Club and intramural sports ==
Brandeis also has 19 club sports and numerous intramural sports. The club sports include sailing which used to be a varsity sport, rugby union, ultimate, crew, lacrosse, field hockey, squash, men's volleyball, skiing and martial arts. The Brandeis archery team hosts the annual Shamrock Shoot, which routinely draws Olympians.

Students, staff, and faculty are allowed to play on intramural teams. Intramural sports include soccer, volleyball, basketball, innertube water polo, dodgeball, softball, and more

== Notable Brandeis alumni in sports ==
Numerous Brandeis alumni have played major roles in the world of sports.

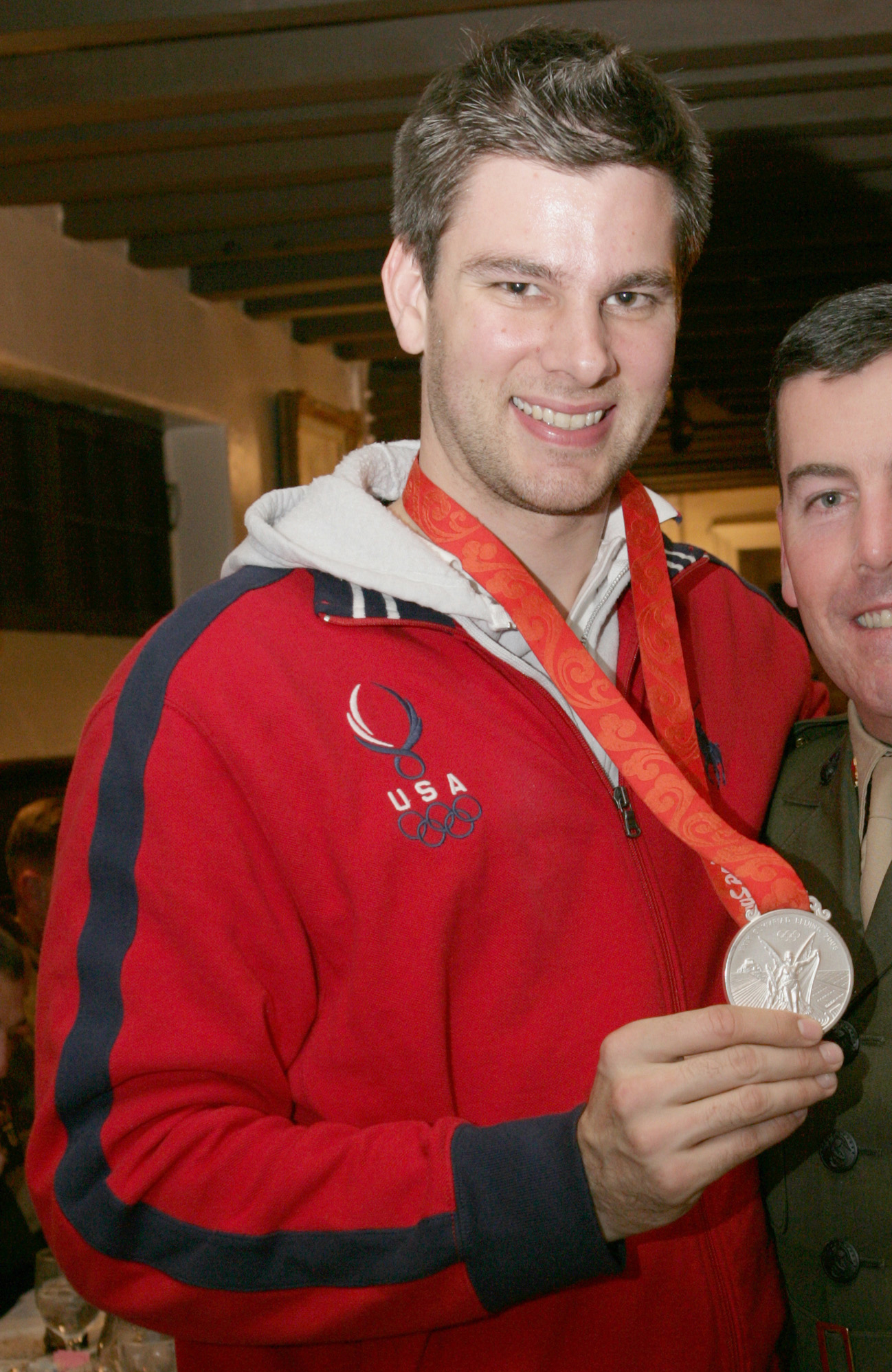
Tim Morehouse

- Nelson Figueroa '98: Major League Baseball pitcher.
- Andy Jick '74: Public address announcer for the Boston College Eagles at the Conte Forum. PA announcer for the Boston Celtics from 1980 to 1997, announcing five NBA Finals.
- Myra Hiatt Kraft '64: Philanthropist and late wife of Bob Kraft, owner of the New England Patriots NFL football team.
- Jeffrey Lurie Phd. '87: Owner of the Philadelphia Eagles NFL football team.
- Tim Morehouse '00: Fencer, Silver Medal winner in Men's Team Sabre at the 2008 Summer Olympics.
