= Stanislaus State Warriors =

Collegiate sports club in the United States

- University: California State University, Stanislaus
- Conference: CCAA (primary); PacWest (women's tennis)
- NCAA: Division II
- Athletic director: Aaron Allaire
- Location: Turlock, California
- Varsity teams: 14 (6 men's, 8 women's)
- Basketball arena: Ed and Bertha Fitzpatrick Arena
- Baseball stadium: Warrior Baseball Field
- Softball stadium: Warrior Softball Field
- Soccer stadium: Warrior Stadium
- Tennis venue: Stan State Tennis Courts
- Mascot: Titus
- Nickname: Warriors
- Fight song: Warriors of the West (Fight On for Stanislaus)
- Colors: Red, white, and gold
- Website: warriorathletics.com

The Stanislaus State Warriors (also Stan State Warriors and Cal State Stanislaus Warriors) are the athletic teams that represent California State University, Stanislaus, located in Turlock, California, in NCAA Division II intercollegiate sports. The Warriors compete as members of the California Collegiate Athletic Association for all 13 varsity sports.

== Varsity teams ==
Men's sports	Women's sports
Baseball	Basketball
Basketball	Cross country
Cross country	Soccer
Golf	Softball
Soccer	Tennis
Track and field^{1}	Track and field^{1}
	Volleyball
^{1} – includes both indoor and outdoor.

== Championships ==
=== Appearances ===
The Stanislaus State Warriors have competed in the NCAA Tournament across 13 active sports (6 men's and 7 women's) 98 times at the Division II level.

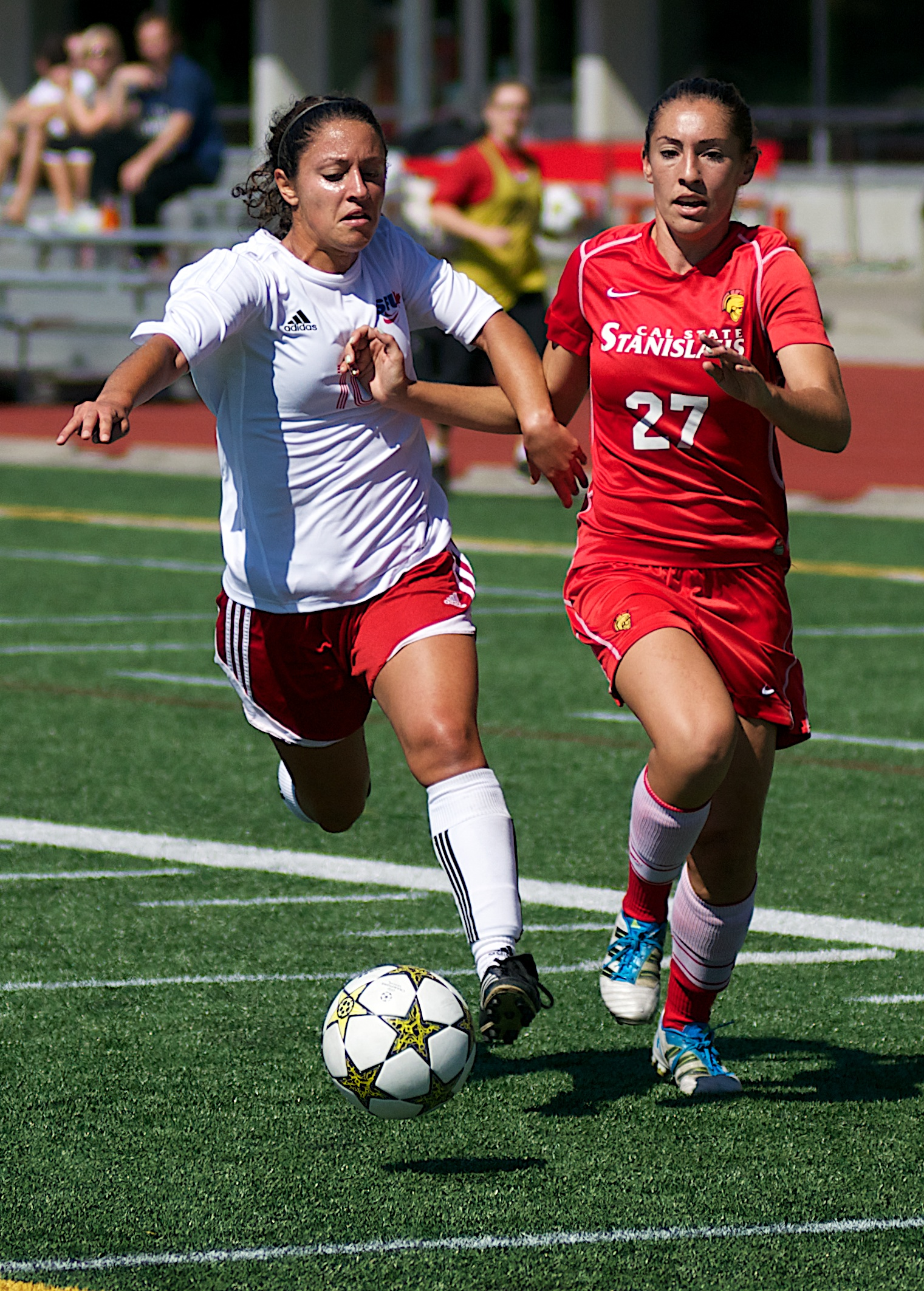
Stanislaus State (in red) v Simon Fraser, women's soccer match, 2012

Sport	App.	Years
Baseball	1	2008
Men's Basketball	1	2014
Women's basketball	3	1990, 1991, 2003
Women's cross country	2	2003, 2012
Men's golf	21	1990 - 1997, 1999 - 2004, 2006, 2007, 2009, 2010, 2012, 2013, 2017
Men's soccer	3	1988, 2012, 2015
Women's soccer	3	2011, 2013, 2014
Softball	6	2000, 2001, 2006 - 2009
Volleyball	1	2025
Women's tennis	2	2009, 2010
Men's indoor track and field	5	2001, 2003, 2005 - 2007
Women's indoor track and field	12	2000, 2002, 2005, 2006, 2010 - 2014, 2023-2025
Men's outdoor track and field	23	1990 - 1995, 1999, 2000, 2002 - 2005, 2007, 2009, 2010, 2012 - 2016, 2018, 2023, 2025
Women's outdoor track and field	24	1990 - 1994, 1999 - 2009, 2011 - 2014, 2016, 2018, 2024-25

=== Team ===
Stanislaus State won 14 national championships at the NCAA Division III level.

- Baseball (2): 1976, 1977
- Men's golf (12): 1976, 1977, 1978, 1979, 1980, 1981, 1984, 1985, 1986, 1987, 1988, 1989

=== Individual ===
Stanislaus State had 11 Warriors win NCAA individual championships at the Division II level.

NCAA individual championships
Order	School year	Athlete(s)	Sport	Ref.
1	1992–93	Carrie Luis	Women's outdoor track and field	
2	1992–93	Carrie Luis	Women's outdoor track and field	
3	1993–94	Geoff Bradshaw	Men's outdoor track and field	
4	1993–94	Jamal Bush	Men's outdoor track and field	
5	1993–94	Carrie Luis	Women's outdoor track and field	
6	1993–94	Carrie Luis	Women's outdoor track and field	
7	1993–94	Undrae Walker	Men's outdoor track and field	
8	2003–04	Chaunte Mitchell	Women's outdoor track and field	
9	2004–05	Chaunte Mitchell	Women's outdoor track and field	
10	2007–08	Kasey Burlingham	Men's outdoor track and field	
11	2013–14	Courtney Anderson	Women's outdoor track and field	
11	2024-25	Annie Wild	Women's indoor track and field	

At the NCAA Division III level, Stanislaus State garnered 12 individual championships.
