= New Jersey Athletic Conference =

NCAA-affiliated college athletic conference

- Formerly: New Jersey State Athletic Conference (1957–1985)
- Association: NCAA
- Founded: 1985; 41 years ago
- Commissioner: Terry Small
- Sports fielded: 20; men's: 9; women's: 11
- Division: Division III
- No. of teams: 10
- Headquarters: Pitman, New Jersey
- Region: New Jersey and New York (2026)
- Website: njacsports.com

Locations
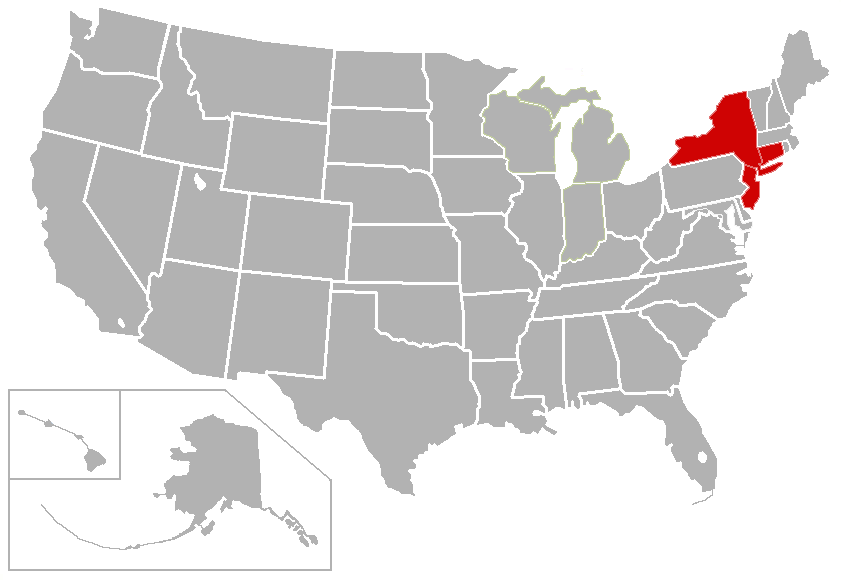

The New Jersey Athletic Conference (NJAC), formerly the New Jersey State Athletic Conference, is an intercollegiate athletic conference affiliated with the NCAA's Division III. All of its current full members are public universities in New Jersey and New York. Affiliate members (lacrosse-only, football-only, or track-only) are located in Colorado, Louisiana, Maryland, New York, Pennsylvania, Virginia, and Vermont.

== History ==
New Jersey Athletic Conference
NJAC members:
north division full member
south division full member

=== Recent events ===
On July 2, 2024, the State University of New York at New Paltz announced that it will join the NJAC as a full member, thus becoming the NJAC's first-ever full member located outside of the state of New Jersey, beginning the 2026–27 academic year.

=== Chronological timeline ===
- 1957 – In 1957, the NJAC was founded as the New Jersey State Athletic Conference (NJSAC). Charter members included Glassboro State College (now Rowan University), Montclair State College (now Montclair State University), Jersey City State College (now New Jersey City University), Newark State College (now Kean University), Trenton State College (now The College of New Jersey) and William Paterson College (now William Paterson University), beginning the 1957–58 academic year.
- 1976 – Ramapo College of New Jersey joined the NJSAC in the 1976–77 academic year.
- 1977 – Stockton State College (now Stockton University) joined the NJSAC in the 1977–78 academic year.
- 1985:
  - Women's programs became part of the NJSAC, when the Jersey Athletic Conference (a women's sports athletic conference) was merged into the NJSAC; thus being rebranded as the New Jersey Athletic Conference (NJAC), beginning the 1985–86 academic year.
  - Rutgers University at Camden and Rutgers University at Newark joined the NJAC in the 1985–86 academic year.
- 2000 – The State University of New York at Cortland joined the NJAC as an affiliate member for football in the 2000 fall season (2000–01 academic year).
- 2004:
  - New Jersey City left the NJAC to become an NCAA D-III Independent after the 2003–04 academic year.
  - Western Connecticut State University joined the NJAC as an affiliate member for football in the 2004 fall season (2004–05 academic year).
- 2005 – New Jersey City rejoined the NJAC after spending one season as an NCAA D-III Independent school in the 2005–06 academic year.
- 2006 – Buffalo State College (now Buffalo State University) joined the NJAC as an affiliate member for football in the 2006 fall season (2006–07 academic year).
- 2008 – The State University of New York at Brockport and the State University of New York at Morrisville (a.k.a. Morrisville State College) joined the NJAC as affiliate members for football in the 2008 fall season (2008–09 academic year).
- 2011 – The State University of New York at Farmingdale (a.k.a. Farmingdale State College) and St. Joseph's College–Long Island (now St. Joseph's University–Long Island) joined the NJAC as affiliate members for men's and women's indoor and outdoor track & field in the 2011–12 academic year).
- 2012 – Buffalo State left the NJAC as an affiliate member for football after the 2011 fall season (2011–12 academic year).
- 2013 – Western Connecticut State left the NJAC as an affiliate member for football after the 2012 fall season (2012–13 academic year).
- 2014:
  - SUNY Brockport left the NJAC as an affiliate member for football after the 2013 fall season (2013–14 academic year).
  - Southern Virginia University joined the NJAC as an affiliate member for football in the 2014 fall season (2014–15 academic year).
- 2015:
  - SUNY Cortland and SUNY Morrisville left the NJAC as affiliate members for football after the 2014 fall season (2014–15 academic year).
  - Christopher Newport University, Frostburg State University, Salisbury University and Wesley College joined the NJAC as affiliate members for football in the 2015 fall season (2015–16 academic year).
- 2018 – The State University of New York at Oneonta, the University of Wisconsin–Eau Claire, the University of Wisconsin–La Crosse and the University of Wisconsin–Whitewater joined the NJAC as affiliate members for men's tennis in the 2019 spring season (2018–19 academic year).
- 2019:
  - Frostburg State and Southern Virginia left the NJAC as affiliate members for football after the 2018 fall season (2018–19 academic year).
  - Five institutions joined the NJAC as affiliate members, all effective in the 2019–20 academic year:
    - Pennsylvania State University at Harrisburg (a.k.a. Penn State–Harrisburg) for men's and women's indoor and outdoor track & field
    - and the State University of New York at Oneonta, the University of Wisconsin–Eau Claire, the University of Wisconsin–La Crosse and the University of Wisconsin–Whitewater for men's tennis
- 2020 – St. Joseph's–Long Island left the NJAC as an affiliate member for men's and women's indoor and outdoor track & field after the 2019–20 academic year; due to athletic budget cuts.
- 2021 – Wesley (Del.) left the NJAC as an affiliate member for football after the 2020 fall season (2020–21 academic year); after the school closed down to later be acquired by Delaware State University.
- 2023:
  - Five institutions left the NJAC as affiliate members, all effective after the 2022–23 academic year:
    - Penn State–Harrisburg for men's and women's indoor and outdoor track & field
    - and SUNY Oneonta, Wisconsin–Eau Claire, Wisconsin–La Crosse and Wisconsin–Whitewater left the NJAC as affiliate members for men's tennis
  - The University of Mary Washington, Roger Williams University and the United States Merchant Marine Academy (a.k.a. Merchant Marine) [with Salisbury adding to its NJAC affiliate membership] joined the NJAC as affiliate members for men's and women's swimming & diving in the 2023–24 academic year.
- 2024 – SUNY Farmingdale left the NJAC as an affiliate member for men's and women's outdoor track & field after the 2024 spring season (2023–24 academic year).
- 2025 – Vermont State University–Castleton joined the NJAC as an affiliate member for football in the 2025 fall season (2025–26 academic year).
- 2026:
  - New Jersey City merged with Kean and left the NJAC & the NCAA to join the United States Collegiate Athletic Association (USCAA) as an independent after the 2025–26 academic year.
  - The State University of New York at New Paltz (a.k.a. SUNY New Paltz) joined the NJAC, beginning the 2026–27 academic year; thus becoming the NJAC's first-ever full member located outside of the state of New Jersey.
  - The NJAC began sponsoring men's lacrosse, adding Centenary College of Louisiana and Colorado College.

== Member schools ==
=== Current full members ===
The NJAC currently has ten full members, all are public schools:

Institution	Location	Founded	Affiliation	Enrollment	Nickname	Joined (Note: Represents the calendar year when fall sports competition begins.)	Colors	Football
Kean University	Union, New Jersey	1855	Public	13,352	Cougars	1957		Yes
Montclair State University	Upper Montclair, New Jersey	1908	Public	22,570	Red Hawks	1957		Yes
Ramapo College	Mahwah, New Jersey	1969	Public	5,145	Roadrunners	1976		No
Rowan University	Glassboro, New Jersey	1923	Public	22,903	Profs	1957		Yes
Rutgers University–Camden	Camden, New Jersey	1950	Public	6,158	Scarlet Raptors	1985		No
Rutgers University–Newark	Newark, New Jersey	1945	Public	12,321	Scarlet Raiders	1985		No
State University of New York at New Paltz	New Paltz, New York	1828	Public	7,489	Hawks	2026		No
Stockton University	Galloway, New Jersey	1969	Public	8,392	Ospreys	1977		No
The College of New Jersey	Ewing, New Jersey	1855	Public	7,340	Lions	1957		Yes
William Paterson University	Wayne, New Jersey	1855	Public	8,398	Pioneers	1957		Yes

=== Affiliate members ===
The NJAC currently has seven affiliate members, all but three are public schools:

Institution	Location	Founded	Affiliation	Enrollment	Nickname	Joined (Note: Represents the calendar year when fall sports competition begins.)	NJAC sport(s)	Primary conference
Centenary College of Louisiana	Shreveport, Louisiana	1825	United Methodist	563	Gentlemen & Ladies	2026	men's lacrosse	Southern (SCAC)
Christopher Newport University	Newport News, Virginia	1961	Public	5,186	Captains	2015	Football	Coast to Coast (C2C)
Colorado College	Colorado Springs, Colorado	1874	Nonsectarian	2,266	Tigers	2026	men's lacrosse	Southern (SCAC)
Farmingdale State College (Note: Also known as the State University of New York at Farmingdale.)	East Farmingdale, New York	1912	Public	7,000	Rams	2011	Men's indoor track & field	Skyline
Farmingdale State College	East Farmingdale, New York	1912	Public	7,000	Rams	2011	Women's indoor track & field	Skyline
University of Mary Washington	Fredericksburg, Virginia	1908	Public	4,862	Eagles	2023	Men's swimming & diving	Coast to Coast (C2C)
University of Mary Washington	Fredericksburg, Virginia	1908	Public	4,862	Eagles	2023	Women's swimming & diving	Coast to Coast (C2C)
Roger Williams University	Bristol, Rhode Island	1956	Nonsectarian	4,702	Hawks	2023	Men's swimming & diving	C. New England (CNE)
Roger Williams University	Bristol, Rhode Island	1956	Nonsectarian	4,702	Hawks	2023	Women's swimming & diving	C. New England (CNE)
Salisbury University	Salisbury, Maryland	1925	Public	8,657	Sea Gulls	2015	Football	Coast to Coast (C2C)
Salisbury University	Salisbury, Maryland	1925	Public	8,657	Sea Gulls	2023	Men's swimming & diving	Coast to Coast (C2C)
Salisbury University	Salisbury, Maryland	1925	Public	8,657	Sea Gulls	2023	Women's swimming & diving	Coast to Coast (C2C)
United States Merchant Marine Academy (Merchant Marine)	Kings Point, New York	1943	Federal	1,011	Mariners	2023	Men's swimming & diving	Skyline
United States Merchant Marine Academy (Merchant Marine)	Kings Point, New York	1943	Federal	1,011	Mariners	2023	Women's swimming & diving	Skyline
Vermont State University at Castleton	Castleton, Vermont	1787	Public (Note: Part of the Vermont State Colleges System.)	2,363	Spartans	2025	Football	Little East (LEC)

=== Former full members ===
The NJAC had one former full member, a public school:

Institution	Location	Founded	Affiliation	Enrollment	Nickname	Joined (Note: Represents the calendar year when fall sports competition begins.)	Left	Current conference
New Jersey City University (Note: Currently known as Kean Jersey City since 2026.) (NJCU)	Jersey City, New Jersey	1929	6,800	Gothic Knights	1957; 2005 (Note: New Jersey City left the NJAC after the 2003–04 school year to compete as an NCAA D-III Independent; which would later rejoin in the 2005–06 school year.)	2004; 2026		USCAA Independent

=== Former affiliate members ===
The NJAC had 15 former affiliate members, all but two were public schools:

Institution	Location	Founded	Affiliation	Enrollment	Nickname	Joined (Note: Represents the calendar year when fall sports competition begins.)	Left (Note: Represents the calendar year when spring sports competition ends.)	NJAC sport(s)	Primary conference
Buffalo State College (Note: Currently known as Buffalo State University since 2023.)	Buffalo, New York	1871	Public (Note: Part of the State University of New York System.)	11,000	Bengals	2006	2012	Football (Note: Buffalo State left the NJAC for the Empire 8 after the 2011 football season (2011–12 school year).)	S.U. New York (SUNYAC)
Farmingdale State College (Note: Also known as the State University of New York at Farmingdale.)	East Farmingdale, New York	1912	Public	7,000	Rams	2011	2024	Men's outdoor track & field	Skyline
Farmingdale State College	East Farmingdale, New York	1912	Public	7,000	Rams	2011	2024	Women's outdoor track & field	Skyline
Frostburg State University (Note: Frostburg State left the NJAC to begin a transition to the NCAA Division II ranks and joined the Mountain East Conference (MEC) after the 2018 football season (2018–19 school year).)	Frostburg, Maryland	1898	Public	5,215	Bobcats	2015	2019	Football	Mountain East (MEC) (Note: Currently an NCAA Division II athletic conference.)
Penn State–Harrisburg	Lower Swatara, Pennsylvania	1966	Public	5,046	Lions	2019	2023	Men's indoor track & field	United East (UEC)
Penn State–Harrisburg	Lower Swatara, Pennsylvania	1966	Public	5,046	Lions	2019	2023	Men's outdoor track & field	United East (UEC)
Penn State–Harrisburg	Lower Swatara, Pennsylvania	1966	Public	5,046	Lions	2019	2023	Women's indoor track & field	United East (UEC)
Penn State–Harrisburg	Lower Swatara, Pennsylvania	1966	Public	5,046	Lions	2019	2023	Women's outdoor track & field	United East (UEC)
St. Joseph's University–Long Island	Patchogue, New York	1916	Nonsectarian	3,810	Golden; Eagles	2011	2020 (Note: The St. Joseph's–Long Island men's and women's indoor track & field teams were discontinued due to athletic budget cuts before due to the COVID pandemic during the 2020–21 school year.)	Men's indoor track & field	Skyline
St. Joseph's University–Long Island	Patchogue, New York	1916	Nonsectarian	3,810	Golden; Eagles	2011	2020 (Note: The St. Joseph's–Long Island men's and women's outdoor track & field teams last competed in the 2018–19 school year. Due to the COVID pandemic, they didn't compete during the remainder of 2019–20; thus they would later be discontinued due to athletic budget cuts during the COVID pandemic of 2020–21.)	Men's outdoor track & field	Skyline
St. Joseph's University–Long Island	Patchogue, New York	1916	Nonsectarian	3,810	Golden; Eagles	2011	2020	Women's indoor track & field	Skyline
St. Joseph's University–Long Island	Patchogue, New York	1916	Nonsectarian	3,810	Golden; Eagles	2011	2020	Women's outdoor track & field	Skyline
Southern Virginia University	Buena Vista, Virginia	1867	LDS Church	1,106	Knights	2014	2019	Football (Note: Southern Virginia left the NJAC to join the Old Dominion Athletic Conference (ODAC) after the 2018 football season (2018–19 school year), and would later become an all-sports member of the USA South Athletic Conference (USA South), beginning the 2021–22 school year.)	USA South
State University of New York at Brockport	Brockport, New York	1867	Public	6,962	Golden; Eagles	2008	2014	Football (Note: SUNY Brockport left the NJAC for the Empire 8 after the 2013 football season (2013–14 school year).)	Empire 8 (E8)
State University of New York at Cortland	Cortland, New York	1868	Public	6,199	Red Dragons	2000	2015	Football (Note: SUNY Cortland and SUNY Morrisville left the NJAC to join the Empire 8 Athletic Conference after the 2014 football season (2014–15 school year).)	S.U. New York (SUNYAC)
State University of New York at Morrisville (Note: Also known as Morrisville State College.)	Morrisville, New York	1908	Public	3,356	Mustangs	2008	2015	Football	United East (UEC)
State University of New York at Oneonta	Oneonta, New York	1889	Public	6,543	Red Dragons	2018	2023	Men's tennis	S.U. New York (SUNYAC)
Wesley College	Dover, Delaware	1873	United; Methodist	2,320	Wolverines	2015	2021	Football	N/A (Note: Wesley was acquired by Delaware State University after the 2020–21 school year.)
Western Connecticut State University	Danbury, Connecticut	1903	Public	6,000	Colonials	2004	2013	Football (Note: Western Connecticut left the NJAC to join the Massachusetts State Collegiate Athletic Conference (MASCAC) after the 2012 football season (2012–13 school year).)	Little East (LEC)
University of Wisconsin–Eau Claire	Eau Claire, Wisconsin	1916	Public (Note: Part of the University of Wisconsin System.)	10,737	Blugolds	2018	2023	Men's tennis	Wisconsin (WIAC)
University of Wisconsin–La Crosse	La Crosse, Wisconsin	1909	Public	10,679	Eagles	2018	2023	Men's tennis	Wisconsin (WIAC)
University of Wisconsin–Whitewater	Whitewater, Wisconsin	1868	Public	12,346	Warhawks	2018	2023	Men's tennis	Wisconsin (WIAC)

=== Membership timeline ===
Full member (all sports) Full member (non-football) Associate member (football) Associate member (sport)

== Sports ==
A divisional format was used for basketball (M / W), baseball, softball, and volleyball until after the 2011 12 school year.
North
- Montclair State
- New Jersey City
- Ramapo
- Rutgers–Newark
- William Paterson
South
- Kean
- Rowan
- Rutgers–Camden
- Stockton
- TCNJ

The NJAC sponsors championships in the following sports:

Conference sports
Sport	Men's	Women's
Baseball	✓	
Basketball	✓	✓
Cross Country	✓	✓
Field Hockey		✓
Football	✓	
Lacrosse	✓	✓
Soccer	✓	✓
Softball		✓
Swimming & Diving	✓	✓
Tennis		✓
Track & Field (Indoor)	✓	✓
Track & Field (Outdoor)	✓	✓
Volleyball	✓	✓

=== Men's sports ===
School	Baseball	Basketball	Cross Country	Football	Lacrosse	Soccer	Swimming & Diving	Track & Field (Indoor)	Track & Field (Outdoor)	Total NJAC Sports
Kean	✓	✓	✓	✓	✓	✓	✗	✗	✓	7
Montclair State	✓	✓	✗	✓	✓	✓	✓ (Note: Swimming only)	✓	✓	8
New Paltz	✓	✓	✓	✗	✓	✓	✓	✗	✗	6
Ramapo	✓	✓	✓	✗	✗	✓	✓	✓	✓	7
Rowan	✓	✓	✓	✓	✗	✓	✓	✓	✓	8
Rutgers–Camden	✓	✓	✓	✗	✗	✓	✗	✓	✓	6
Rutgers–Newark	✓	✓	✓	✗	✗	✓	✗	✓	✓	6
Stockton	✓	✓	✓	✗	✓	✓	✗	✓	✓	7
TCNJ	✓	✓	✓	✓	✗	✓	✓	✓	✓	8
William Paterson	✓	✓	✗	✓	✗	✓	✓	✗	✗	5
Totals	10	10	8	5+3	4+2	10	6+4	7+1	8	68+10
Affiliate Members
Castleton				✓						1
Centenary					✓					1
Christopher Newport				✓						1
Colorado College					✓					1
Farmingdale State								✓		1
Mary Washington							✓			1
Merchant Marine							✓			1
Roger Williams							✓			1
Salisbury				✓			✓			2

==== Men's varsity sports not sponsored by the NJAC ====
School	Golf	Tennis	Volleyball	Wrestling
Kean	IND		Landmark	IND
New Paltz			NEWMAC	
Ramapo			Landmark	
Rutgers–Camden	UEC	WIAC		
Rutgers–Newark			CVC	
TCNJ		WIAC		IND
William Paterson	IND			

=== Women's sports ===
School	Basketball	Cross Country	Field Hockey	Lacrosse	Soccer	Softball	Swimming & Diving	Tennis	Track & Field (Indoor)	Track & Field (Outdoor)	Volleyball	Total NJAC Sports
Kean	✓	✓	✓	✓	✓	✓	✓ (Note: Swimming only)	✓	✗	✓	✓	10
Montclair State	✓	✓	✓	✓	✓	✓	✓	✗	✓	✓	✓	10
New Paltz	✓	✓	✓	✓	✓	✓	✓	✓	✗	✗	✓	9
Ramapo	✓	✓	✓	✓	✓	✓	✓	✗	✓	✓	✓	10
Rowan	✓	✓	✓	✓	✓	✓	✓	✗	✓	✓	✓	10
Rutgers–Camden	✓	✓	✗	✗	✓	✓	✗	✓	✓	✓	✓	8
Rutgers–Newark	✓	✓	✗	✗	✓	✓	✗	✗	✓	✓	✓	7
Stockton	✓	✓	✓	✓	✓	✓	✗	✓	✓	✓	✓	10
TCNJ	✓	✓	✓	✓	✓	✓	✓	✓	✓	✓	✗	10
William Paterson	✓	✗	✓	✗	✓	✓	✓	✓	✗	✗	✓	7
Totals	10	9	8	7	10	10	7+4	6	7+1	8	9	91+5
Affiliate Members
Farmingdale State									✓			1
Mary Washington							✓					1
Merchant Marine							✓					1
Roger Williams							✓					1
Salisbury							✓					1

==== Women's varsity sports not sponsored by the NJAC ====
School	Flag Football	Golf	Rowing	Wrestling
Kean	ECAC	CWGC		IND
Montclair State	ECAC			
Stockton		CWGC	MARC	

== National championship teams ==
Since the NCAA established the three division system in 1973, NJAC members have won a total of 64 team championships.

- Baseball

Kean: 2007
Montclair State: 1987, 1993, 2000
Ramapo: 1984
Rowan: 1978, 1979
William Paterson: 1992, 1996

- Men's Basketball

Rowan: 1996

- Field Hockey

Rowan: 2002
TCNJ: 1981, 1983, 1985, 1988, 1990, 1991, 1995, 1996, 1999, 2011, 2014

- Men's Golf

Ramapo: 1982

- Women's Lacrosse

TCNJ: 1985, 1987, 1988, 1991, 1992, 1993, 1994, 1995, 1996, 1998, 2000, 2005, 2006

- Men's Soccer

Kean: 1992
Richard Stockton: 2001
Rowan: 1981, 1990
TCNJ: 1996

- Women's Soccer

TCNJ: 1993, 1994, 2000

- Softball

Rutgers-Camden: 2006
TCNJ: 1983, 1987, 1989, 1992, 1994, 1996

- Women's Tennis

TCNJ: 1986

- Men's Indoor Track

Rowan: 2026

- Men's Outdoor Track

Rowan: 1980, 1981, 1982, 1983, 1984

- Wrestling

Montclair State: 1976, 1986
TCNJ: 1979, 1981, 1984, 1985, 1987
