= 1978 NCAA Division II baseball tournament =

- Season: 1978
- Finals site: Lanphier Park; Springfield, IL
- Champions: Florida Southern (4th title)
- Runner-up: Delta State (2nd CWS Appearance)
- Winning coach: Joe Arnold (1st title)
- MOP: Ricky Perkins (3B) (Delta State)
- Attendance: 625

The 1978 NCAA Division II baseball tournament was the postseason tournament hosted by the NCAA to determine the national champion of baseball among its Division II colleges and universities at the end of the 1978 NCAA Division II baseball season.

Florida Southern defeated Delta State in the championship game of the double-elimination tournament, 7–2, winning the Moccasins' fourth national title. Florida Southern were coached by Joe Arnold.

== Regionals ==
The regionals consisted of 32 teams in eight groupings. Each regional consisted of a 4-team bracket. All brackets were double elimination format. The top team in each bracket advanced to the 1978 Division II College World Series.

=== New England Regional ===
Team	Wins	Losses
New Haven	3	0
Sacred Heart	2	2
NYIT	1	2
Assumption	0	2

=== Middle Atlantic Regional ===
Team	Wins	Losses
Le Moyne	3	1
Shippensburg	3	2
UMBC	1	2
Towson	0	2

=== South Atlantic Regional ===
Team	Wins	Losses
Valdosta State	3	0
West Georgia	2	2
Augusta	1	2
Albany State	0	2

=== South Regional ===
Team	Wins	Losses
Florida Southern	3	0
FIU	2	2
Saint Leo	1	2
Eckerd	0	2

=== Great Lakes Regional ===
Team	Wins	Losses
Eastern Illinois	4	1
Western Illinois	2	2
Wright State	1	2
Indianapolis	0	2

=== North Central Regional ===
Team	Wins	Losses
Southwest Missouri State	3	0
Northwest Missouri State	2	2
UMSL	1	2
Morningside	0	2

=== South Central Regional ===
Team	Wins	Losses
Delta State	3	1
Troy State	3	2
Minnesota State	1	2
Southeastern Louisiana	0	2

=== West Regional ===
Team	Wins	Losses
San Diego	4	1
Chapman	2	2
UC Davis	1	2
Chico State	0	2

== Finals ==
=== Participants ===
School	Conference	Record (conference)	Head coach	Previous finals appearances	Best finals finish	Finals record
Delta State	Gulf South	43–19 (14–4)	Dave Ferriss	2 (last:1977)	2nd	5–3
Eastern Illinois	Independent	27–19	Tom McDevitt	1 (last: 1973)	3rd	2–2
Florida Southern	Sunshine State	34–11	Joe Arnold	6 (last: 1976)	1st	13–9
Le Moyne	Independent	28–12	Dick Rockwell	0 (last: none)	None	0–0
New Haven	Independent	32–4	Frank Vieira	2 (last:1977)	3rd	3–4
San Diego	Independent	33–22	John Cunningham	1 (last: 1971)	3rd	1–2
Southwest Missouri State	MAIAA	28–10 (11–4)	Bill Rowe	2 (last:1970)	2nd	3–4
Valdosta State	SAC	39–20 (9–3)	Tommy Thomas	2 (last:1977)	3rd	2–4

=== Results ===
==== Bracket ====
First Round
Delta State	12
Southwest Missouri State	2
Eastern Illinois	6
San Diego	15
Florida Southern	14
New Haven	9
Le Moyne	9
Valdosta State	10

Second Round
Delta State	6
San Diego	1
Florida Southern	13
Valdosta State	7
Consolation First Round
New Haven	7^{10}
Le Moyne	6
SW Missouri State	11
Eastern Illinois	21

Third Round
Delta State	8
Florida Southern	13
Consolation Second Round
San Diego	5
New Haven	11
Valdosta State	11
Eastern Illinois	9

Semifinals
Florida Southern	8
New Haven	14
Delta State	9
Valdosta State	5

Preliminary Final
New Haven	11
Delta State	12

Championship
Florida Southern	7
Delta State	2

==== Game Results ====
Date	Game	Winner	Score	Loser	Notes
May 25	Game 1	Delta State	12–2	Southwest Missouri State	
May 25	Game 2	San Diego	15–6	Eastern Illinois	
May 26	Game 3	Florida Southern	14–9	New Haven	
May 26	Game 4	Valdosta State	10–9	Le Moyne	
May 27	Game 5	Eastern Illinois	21–11	Southwest Missouri State	Southwest Missouri State eliminated
May 27	Game 6	New Haven	7–6^{10}	Le Moyne	Le Moyne eliminated
May 27	Game 7	Delta State	6–1	San Diego	
May 27	Game 8	Florida Southern	13–7	Valdosta State	
May 28	Game 9	New Haven	11–5	San Diego	San Diego eliminated
May 28	Game 10	Valdosta State	11–9	Eastern Illinois	Eastern Illinois eliminated
May 29	Game 11	Florida Southern	13–8	Delta State	
May 30	Game 12	Delta State	9–5	Valdosta State	Valdosta State eliminated
May 30	Game 13	New Haven	14–8	Florida Southern	
May 31	Game 14	Delta State	12–1	New Haven	New Haven eliminated
May 31	Game 15	Florida Southern	7–2	Delta State	Florida Southern wins National Championship

== See also ==
- 1978 NCAA Division I baseball tournament
- 1978 NCAA Division III baseball tournament
- 1978 NAIA World Series
