= 1981 NCAA Division II baseball tournament =

- Season: 1981
- Finals site: Riverside Sports Complex; Riverside, California
- Champions: Florida Southern (5th title)
- Runner-up: Eastern Illinois (1st CWS Appearance)
- Winning coach: Joe Arnold (2nd title)
- MOP: Joe Sickles (OF) (Florida Southern)
- Attendance: 10,644

The 1981 NCAA Division II baseball tournament was the postseason tournament hosted by the NCAA to determine the national champion of baseball among its Division II colleges and universities at the end of the 1981 NCAA Division II baseball season. For the second consecutive year, the final tournament was played at the Riverside Sports Complex in Riverside, California.

Florida Southern defeated Eastern Illinois, 9–0, in the championship game of the double-elimination tournament, capturing the Moccasins' fifth national title and first since 1978. Florida Southern was coached by Joe Arnold.

== Regionals ==
The regionals consisted of 18 teams in six groupings. Four regionals consisted of a 4-team bracket while the remaining two played a best of five series. All brackets were double elimination format. The top team in each bracket advanced to the 1981 Division II College World Series.

=== Northeast Regional ===
Team	Wins	Losses
Le Moyne	3	0
Adelphi	2	2
UMass Lowell	1	2
New Haven	0	2

=== South Regional ===
Team	Wins	Losses
Florida Southern	3	1
Eckerd	1	3

=== Midwest Regional ===
Team	Wins	Losses
Eastern Illinois	4	1
Omaha	2	2
Lewis	1	2
Central Missouri	0	2

=== South Atlantic Regional ===
Team	Wins	Losses
Cal State Northridge	4	1
Valdosta State	2	2
Columbus State	1	2
Shippensburg	0	2

=== Central Regional ===
Team	Wins	Losses
Troy State	3	0
Delta State	2	2
Northern Kentucky	1	2
Indianapolis	0	2

=== West Regional ===
Team	Wins	Losses
UC Riverside	3	1
San Francisco State	1	3

== Finals ==
=== Participants ===
School	Conference	Record (conference)	Head coach	Previous finals appearances	Best finals finish	Finals record
Cal State Northridge	CCAA	38–29 (17–13)	Bob Hiegert	3 (last: 1975)	1st	6–5
Eastern Illinois	Independent	36–14	Tom McDevitt	2 (last: 1978)	2nd	3–4
Florida Southern	Sunshine State	55–8 (10–5)	Joe Arnold	9 (last: 1980)	1st	20–14
Le Moyne	Independent	27–6	Dick Rockwell	2 (last: 1979)	2nd	3–4
Troy State	Gulf South	37–10 (12–0)	Chase Riddle	1 (last: 1980)	3rd	1–2
UC Riverside	CCAA	39–23 (17–13)	Jack Smitheran	1 (last: 1977)	1st	5–1

=== Results ===
==== Bracket ====
First Round
Cal State Northridge	10
Le Moyne	5
Eastern Illinois	3
Troy State	12
UC Riverside	4
Florida Southern	6

Second Round
UC Riverside	12
Cal State Northridge	14
Troy State	1
Florida Southern	5
Le Moyne	5
Eastern Illinois	7

Semifinals
Cal State Northridge	1
Florida Southern	6
Troy State	3
Eastern Illinois	8

Championship
Cal State Northridge	2
Eastern Illinois	3

Final
Florida Southern	9
Eastern Illinois	0

==== Game results ====
Date	Game	Winner	Score	Loser	Notes
May 23	Game 1	Cal State Northridge	10–5	Le Moyne	
May 23	Game 2	Troy State	12–3	Eastern Illinois	
May 23	Game 3	Florida Southern	6–4	UC Riverside	
May 24	Game 4	Eastern Illinois	7–5	Le Moyne	Le Moyne eliminated
May 24	Game 5	Cal State Northridge	14–12	UC Riverside	UC Riverside eliminated
May 24	Game 6	Florida Southern	5–1	Troy State	
May 25	Game 7	Eastern Illinois	8–3	Troy State	Troy State eliminated
May 25	Game 8	Florida Southern	6–1	Cal State Northridge	
May 25	Game 9	Eastern Illinois	3–2	Cal State Northridge	Cal State Northridge eliminated
May 27	Game 10	Florida Southern	0–9	Eastern Illinois	Florida Southern wins National Championship

== See also ==
- 1981 NCAA Division I baseball tournament
- 1981 NCAA Division III baseball tournament
- 1981 NAIA World Series
