= 1982 NCAA Division II baseball tournament =

- Season: 1982
- Finals site: Riverside Sports Complex; Riverside, California
- Champions: UC Riverside (2nd title)
- Runner-up: Florida Southern (7th CWS Appearance)
- Winning coach: Jack Smitheran (2nd title)
- MOP: Joe Sickles (OF) (Florida Southern)
- Attendance: 10,925

The 1982 NCAA Division II baseball tournament was the postseason tournament hosted by the NCAA to determine the national champion of baseball among its Division II colleges and universities at the end of the 1982 NCAA Division II baseball season.

For the third year, the tournament was played at the Riverside Sports Complex in Riverside, California.

UC Riverside defeated Florida Southern, 10–1, in the championship game of the double-elimination tournament, capturing the Highlanders' second national title and first since 1977. UC Riverside was coached by Jack Smitheran.

== Regionals ==
The regionals consisted of 18 teams in six groupings. Four regionals consisted of a 4-team bracket while the remaining two played a best of five series. All brackets were double elimination format. The top team in each bracket advanced to the 1982 Division II College World Series.

=== Northeast Regional ===
Team	Wins	Losses
New Haven	4	1
Le Moyne	2	2
Assumption	1	2
LIU Post	0	2

=== Central Regional ===
Team	Wins	Losses
Delta State	3	0
Indianapolis	1	2
Jacksonville State	0	2

=== Midwest Regional ===
Team	Wins	Losses
Southwest Missouri State	3	0
Minnesota State	2	2
Northwest Missouri State	1	2
SIU Edwardsville	0	2

=== South Regional ===
Team	Wins	Losses
Florida Southern	3	2
FIU	2	3

=== South Atlantic Regional ===
Team	Wins	Losses
Longwood	3	1
Valdosta State	3	2
West Georgia	1	2
Slippery Rock	0	2

=== West Regional ===
Team	Wins	Losses
UC Riverside	3	1
Cal State Northridge	2	2
San Francisco State	0	2

== Finals ==
=== Participants ===
School	Conference	Record (conference)	Head coach	Previous finals appearances	Best finals finish	Finals record
Delta State	Gulf South	41–19 (7–1)	Boo Ferriss	3 (last: 1978)	2nd	9–5
Florida Southern	Sunshine State	50–11 (19–2)	Joe Arnold	10 (last: 1981)	1st	24–14
Longwood	Independent	31–10–1	Buddy Bolding	0 (last: none)	None	0–0
New Haven	Independent	27–7	Frank Vieira	5 (last: 1980)	2nd	10–10
Southwest Missouri State	Independent	31–14	Bill Rowe	3 (last: 1978)	2nd	3–6
UC Riverside	CCAA	36–23 (19–10)	Jack Smitheran	2 (last: 1981)	1st	5–3

=== Results ===
==== Bracket ====
First Round
Delta State	2
Florida Southern	18
New Haven	6
Southwest Missouri State	1
UC Riverside	6
Longwood	1

Second Round
Florida Southern	11
Longwood	0
New Haven	3
UC Riverside	4
Delta State	7
Southwest Missouri State	5

Third Round
Florida Southern	7
UC Riverside	8
New Haven	1
Delta State	5

Semifinal
Florida Southern	13
Delta State	9

Championship
UC Riverside	10
Florida Southern	1

==== Game Results ====
Date	Game	Winner	Score	Loser	Notes
May 22	Game 1	Florida Southern	18–2	Delta State	
May 22	Game 2	New Haven	6–1	Southwest Missouri State	
May 22	Game 3	UC Riverside	6–1	Longwood	
May 23	Game 4	Delta State	7–5	Southwest Missouri State	Southwest Missouri State eliminated
May 23	Game 5	Florida Southern	11–0	Longwood	Longwood eliminated
May 23	Game 6	UC Riverside	4–3	New Haven	
May 24	Game 7	Delta State	5–1	New Haven	New Haven eliminated
May 24	Game 8	UC Riverside	8–7	Florida Southern	
May 24	Game 9	Florida Southern	13–9	Delta State	Delta State eliminated
May 25	Game 10	UC Riverside	10–1	Florida Southern	UC Riverside wins National Championship

== See also ==
- 1982 NCAA Division II softball tournament
- 1982 NCAA Division I baseball tournament
- 1982 NCAA Division III baseball tournament
- 1982 NAIA World Series
