= 1974 NCAA Division II baseball tournament =

- Season: 1974
- Teams: 25
- Finals site: Lanphier Park; Springfield, Illinois
- Champions: UC Irvine (2nd title)
- Runner-up: New Orleans (1st CWS Appearance)
- Winning coach: Gary Adams (2nd title)
- MOP: Jeff Malinoff (UC Irvine)

The 1974 NCAA Division II baseball tournament decided the champion of baseball at the NCAA Division II level for the 1974 season. This was the seventh such tournament for the Division, having separated from the University Division in 1957, and further dividing into Division II and Division III for the 1974 season. The UC Irvine Anteaters won the championship by defeating the New Orleans.

== Regionals ==
=== Northeast Region ===
Team	Wins	Losses
New Haven	4	1
Montclair State	4	2
LIU Post	2	2
Ithaca	1	2
Adelphi	0	2
MIT	0	2

=== South Atlantic Region ===
Team	Wins	Losses
Valdosta State	3	1
Eckerd	3	2
Rollins	1	2
Florida Southern	0	2

=== Mideast Region ===
Team	Wins	Losses
Ohio Northern	3	1
Western Illinois	3	2
Valparaiso	1	2
SIU Edwardsville	0	2

=== South Region ===
Team	Wins	Losses
New Orleans	4	1
Nicholls State	2	2
Maryville	1	2
Alabama State	0	2

=== Midwest Region ===
Team	Wins	Losses
Central Missouri	3	1
Minnesota State	2	2
Nebraska Wesleyan	0	2

=== West Region ===
Team	Wins	Losses
UC Irvine	3	0
Sacramento State	2	2
Puget Sound	1	2
Cal State Fullerton	0	2

== Finals ==
=== Participants ===
School	Conference	Record (conference)	Head coach	Previous finals appearances	Best finals finish	Finals record
Central Missouri	MIAA	27–13 (9–3)	Bob Tompkins	0 (last: none)	none	0–0
New Haven	Independent	26–8	Frank Vieira	0 (last: none)	none	0–0
New Orleans	Independent	34–14	Ron Maestri	0 (last: none)	none	0–0
Ohio Northern	OAC	23–9 (12–1)	Herb Strayer	0 (last: none)	none	0–0
UC Irvine	Independent	48–8	Gary Adams	2 (last: 1973)	1st	4–2
Valdosta State	SAC	38–13 (16–2)	Tommy Thomas	0 (last: none)	none	0–0

=== Results ===
==== Bracket ====
First round
UC Irvine	6
New Haven	2
New Orleans	13
Valdosta State	9
Central Missouri	2
Ohio Northern	0

Second round
UC Irvine	8
Ohio Northern	1
New Orleans	6
Central Missouri	2
New Haven	1
Valdosta State	0

Third round
UC Irvine	12
New Orleans	6
Central Missouri	0
New Haven	4

Semifinals
New Orleans	9
New Haven	2

Final
UC Irvine	6	14
New Orleans	7	1

==== Game results ====
Game	Winner	Score	Loser	Notes
Game 1	UC Irvine	6–2	New Haven	
Game 2	New Orleans	13–9	Valdosta State	
Game 3	Central Missouri	2–0	Ohio Northern	
Game 4	New Haven	1–0	Valdosta State	Valdosta State eliminated
Game 5	UC Irvine	8–1	Ohio Northern	Ohio Northern eliminated
Game 6	New Orleans	6–2	Central Missouri	
Game 7	New Haven	4–0	Central Missouri	Central Missouri eliminated
Game 8	UC Irvine	12–6	New Orleans	
Game 9	New Orleans	9–2	New Haven	New Haven eliminated
Game 10	New Orleans	7–6	UC Irvine	
Game 11	UC Irvine	14–1	New Orleans	UC Irvine wins National Championship

== See also ==
- 1974 NCAA Division I baseball tournament
- 1974 NAIA World Series
