= 1984 NCAA Division II baseball tournament =

- Season: 1984
- Finals site: Riverside Sports Complex; Riverside, California
- Champions: Cal State Northridge (2nd title)
- Runner-up: Florida Southern (8th CWS Appearance)
- Winning coach: Bob Hiegert (2nd title)
- MOP: Perry Husband (2B) (Cal State Northridge)
- Attendance: 7,737

The 1984 NCAA Division II baseball tournament was the postseason tournament hosted by the NCAA to determine the national champion of baseball among its Division II colleges and universities at the end of the 1984 NCAA Division II baseball season.

For the fifth year, the tournament was played at the Riverside Sports Complex in Riverside, California.

Cal State Northridge defeated Florida Southern, 10–5, in the second game of the championship series of the double-elimination tournament, capturing the Matadors' second national title and first since 1970 (as San Fernando Valley State). Cal State Northridge was coached by Bob Hiegert.

== Regionals ==
The regionals consisted of 20 teams in six groupings. Four regionals consisted of a 4-team double-elimination bracket while the remaining two played a best of five series. The top team in each bracket advanced to the 1984 Division II College World Series.

=== Northeast Regional ===
Quarterfinals
New Haven	10
UMass Lowell	2
Winner's bracket
Adelphi	7
Quinnipiac	3
UMass Lowell	5
Quinnipiac	8
Loser's bracket

Semi-finals
New Haven	6
Adelphi	5
Adelphi	2
Quinnipiac	11

Finals
New Haven	12
Quinnipiac	3

=== South Atlantic Regional ===
Quarterfinals
Shippensburg	8
West Georgia	7
Winner's bracket
Columbus	19
Longwood	1
West Georgia	11
Longwood	12 ^{(13)}
Loser's bracket

Semi-finals
Shippensburg	5
Columbus	6 ^{(12)}
Shippensburg	3
Longwood	1

Finals
Columbus	7
Shippensburg	3

=== South Regional ===
Finals
Florida Southern	9	4	6
Tampa	4	3	1

=== Midwest Regional ===
Quarterfinals
UMSL	5
Sam Houston State	2
Winner's bracket
South Dakota State	3
Lewis	2
Sam Houston State	8
Lewis	24
Loser's bracket

Semi-finals
UMSL	6
South Dakota State	11
UMSL	14
Lewis	5

Finals
South Dakota State	15
UMSL	3

=== Central Regional ===
Quarterfinals
Jacksonville State	6
Indianapolis	4
Winner's bracket
North Alabama	2
Troy State	1
Indianapolis	6
Troy State	7
Loser's bracket

Semi-finals
Jacksonville State	1
North Alabama	2 ^{(10)}
Jacksonville State	1
Troy State	5

Finals
North Alabama	3	3
Troy State	9	9

=== West Regional ===
Finals
Cal State Northridge	6 ^{(11)}	9	12	9
Chapman	5	5	15	9

== Finals ==
=== Participants ===
School	Conference	Record (conference)	Head coach	Previous finals appearances	Best finals finish	Finals record
Cal State Northridge	CCAA	46–21–1 (20–10)	Bob Hiegert	4 (last: 1981)	1st	8–7
Columbus	Independent	42–12–1	Charles Ragsdale	0 (last: none)	None	0–0
Florida Southern	Sunshine State	47–15 (21–7)	Chuck Anderson	12 (last: 1983)	1st	30–18
New Haven	NECC	22–7 (9–3)	Frank Vieira	6 (last: 1982)	2nd	11–12
South Dakota State	NCC	27–13 (9–4)	Mark Ekeland	0 (last: none)	None	0–0
Troy State	Gulf South	29–10 (8–2)	Chase Riddle	2 (last: 1981)	3rd	2–4

=== Results ===
==== Bracket ====
First Round
New Haven	4
Troy State	5
Columbus	5
Florida Southern	17
Cal State Northridge	17
South Dakota State	2

Second Round
Troy State	12
South Dakota State	6
Florida Southern	7
Cal State Northridge	6
New Haven	7
Columbus	6

Third Round
Troy State	3
Florida Southern	12
Cal State Northridge	11
New Haven	3

Semifinal
Troy State	4
Cal State Northridge	12

Championship
Florida Southern	0	5
Cal State Northridge	10	10

==== Game Results ====
Date	Game	Winner	Score	Loser	Notes
May 26	Game 1	Troy State	5 – 4	New Haven	
May 26	Game 2	Florida Southern	17 – 5	Columbus	
May 26	Game 3	Cal State Northridge	17 – 2	South Dakota State	
May 27	Game 4	New Haven	7 – 6	Columbus	Columbus eliminated
May 27	Game 5	Troy State	12 – 6	South Dakota State	South Dakota State eliminated
May 27	Game 6	Florida Southern	7 – 6	Cal State Northridge	
May 28	Game 7	Florida Southern	12 – 3	Troy State	
May 28	Game 8	Cal State Northridge	11 – 3	New Haven	New Haven eliminated
May 28	Game 9	Cal State Northridge	12 – 4	Troy State	Troy State eliminated
May 29	Game 10	Cal State Northridge	6 – 3	Florida Southern	
May 30	Game 11	Cal State Northridge	10 – 5	Florida Southern	Cal State Northridge wins National Championship

== See also ==
- 1984 NCAA Division I baseball tournament
- 1984 NCAA Division III baseball tournament
- 1984 NAIA World Series
- 1984 NCAA Division II softball tournament
