= 1977 NCAA Division II baseball tournament =

- Season: 1977
- Finals site: Lanphier Park; Springfield, IL
- Champions: UC Riverside (1 title)
- Runner-up: Eckerd (1st CWS Appearance)
- Winning coach: Jack Smitherman (1st title)
- MOP: Joe Lefebvre (OF-P) and Steve Glaum (P) (Eckerd Tritons and UC Riverside)
- Attendance: 11,817

The 1977 NCAA Division II baseball tournament was the 10th edition of the NCAA Division II baseball tournament. The 31-team tournament decided the champion of baseball in NCAA Division II for the 1977 season. The UC Riverside Highlanders won their first national championship, beating the Eckerd Tritons. UC Riverside coach Jack Smitherman won his first title with the team, while Joe Lefebvre of Eckerd and Steve Glaum of UC Riverside were named Tournament Co-Most Outstanding Players.

== Regionals ==
The regionals consisted of 31 teams in eight groupings. There were five 4-team brackets, one 6-team bracket, one 3-team bracket, and one 2-team bracket. All brackets were double elimination format, with the exception of the 2-team bracket which was a best of 3 format. The top team in each bracket advanced to the 1977 Division II College World Series.

=== New England Regional ===
First round
New Haven	10
LIU Post	6
Le Moyne	13
Adelphi	12
Lower round 1
Adelphi	11
LIU Post	4

Semi-finals
New Haven	20
Le Moyne	3
Lower final
Le Moyne	8
Adelphi	7

Finals
New Haven	5	10
Le Moyne	6	5

=== Middle Atlantic Regional ===
Team	Wins	Losses
Shippensburg	3	0
California (PA)	1	2
UMBC	0	2

=== South Atlantic Regional ===
Team	Wins	Losses
Valdosta State	4	1
West Georgia	2	2
Columbus	1	2
Randolph–Macon	0	2

=== South Regional ===
Team	Wins	Losses
Eckerd	3	0
Florida Southern	2	2
Jacksonville State	1	2
Troy State	0	2

=== Great Lakes Regional ===
Team	Wins	Losses
SIU Edwardsville	3	0
Northern Kentucky	2	2
Wright State	1	2
Youngstown State	0	2

=== North Central Regional ===
Team	Wins	Losses
UMSL	4	0
Omaha	3	2
Southeast Missouri State	2	2
Southwest Missouri State	1	2
Minnesota State	0	2
South Dakota State	0	2

=== South Central Regional ===
Team	Wins	Losses
Delta State	2	1
Nicholls State	1	2

=== West Regional ===
First round
UC Riverside	4
Cal State Hayward	1
Cal State Northridge	16
Cal Poly	1
Lower round 1
Cal State Hayward	W
Cal Poly	L

Semi-finals
UC Riverside	W
Cal State Northridge	L
Lower final
Cal State Hayward	W
Cal State Northridge	L

Finals
UC Riverside	3	W
Cal State Hayward	7	L

== College World Series ==
=== Participants ===
School	Conference	Record	Head coach	CWS appearances	CWS best finish	Finals record
Delta State	Gulf South Conference	41–17	Boo Ferries	1 (last: 1968)	2nd	2–2
Eckerd	Independent	34–9	Bill Livesey	0 (last: none)	None	0–0
New Haven	Independent	28–4	Frank Vieira	1 (last: 1974)	3rd	2–2
Shippensburg	Pennsylvania State Athletic Conference	32–11	Art Fairchild	0 (last: none)	None	0–0
SIU Edwardsville	Independent	25-18-1	Roy Lee	2 (last: 1976)	2nd	4–4
UC Riverside	California Collegiate Athletic Association	43–19	Jack Smitherman	0 (last: none)	None	0–0
UMSL	Independent	30–13	Jim Dix	2 (last: 1973)	4th	1–4
Valdosta State	Independent	47–16	Tommy Thomas	1 (last: 1974)	6th	0–2

==== Bracket ====
Upper round 1
New Haven	6
Shippensburg	1
Eckerd	2
Valdosta State	1
UMSL	9
SIU Edwardsville	5
UC Riverside	8
Delta State	2

Upper round 2
New Haven	2
Eckerd	14
UMSL	0
UC Riverside	12
Lower round 1
Shippensburg	1
Valdosta State	2
SIU Edwardsville	4
Delta State	5

Upper final
Eckerd	8
UC Riverside	2
Lower round 2
UM St. Louis	4
Valdosta State	11
New Haven	3
Delta State	5

Semifinals
Eckerd	6
Delta State	8
UC Riverside	8
Valdosta State	7

Preliminary final
Delta State	3
UC Riverside	5

Final
Eckerd	1
UC Riverside	4

==== Game results ====
Date	Game	Winner	Score	Loser	Notes
May 28	1	New Haven	6–1	Shippensburg	
May 28	2	Eckerd	2–1	Valdosta State	
May 28	3	UMSL	9–5	SIU Edwardsville	
May 28	4	UC Riverside	8–2	Delta State	
May 29	5	Valdosta State	2–1 (13)	Shippensburg	Shippensburg eliminated
May 29	6	Delta State	5–4	SIU Edwardsville	SIU Edwardsville eliminated
May 29	7	Eckerd	14–2	New Haven	
May 29	8	UC Riverside	12–0	UMSL	
May 30	9	Delta State	5–3	New Haven	New Haven eliminated
May 30	10	Valdosta State	11–4	Missouri-St. Louis	UMSL eliminated
May 30	11	Eckerd	8–2	UC Riverside	
May 31	12	Delta State	8–6	Eckerd	
May 31	13	UC Riverside	8–7	Valdosta State	Valdosta St. eliminated
June 1	14	UC Riverside	5–3	Delta State	Delta State eliminated
June 2	15	UC Riverside	4–1	Eckerd	UC Riverside wins CWS

== See also ==
- 1977 NCAA Division I baseball tournament
- 1977 NCAA Division III baseball tournament
- 1977 NAIA World Series
