= 1976 NCAA Division II baseball tournament =

- Season: 1976
- Teams: 30
- Finals site: Lanphier Park; Springfield, Illinois
- Champions: Cal Poly Pomona (1st title)
- Runner-up: SIU Edwardsville (3rd CWS Appearance)
- Winning coach: John Scolinos (1st title)
- MOP: Ken Hellyer (Cal Poly Pomona)

The 1976 NCAA Division II baseball tournament decided the champion of baseball at the NCAA Division II level for the 1976 season. This was the eighth such tournament for the Division, having separated from the University Division in 1957, and further dividing into Division II and Division III for the 1976 season. Cal Poly Pomona won the championship by defeating SIU Edwardsville.

== Regionals ==
=== Northeast Regional ===
Team	Wins	Losses
Sacred Heart	4	0
New Haven	3	2
LIU Post	2	2
Le Moyne	1	2
Siena	0	2
Springfield	0	2

=== South Atlantic Regional ===
Team	Wins	Losses
Florida Southern	4	0
James Madison	3	2
Eckerd	2	2
Rollins	1	2
Columbus State	0	2
FIU	0	2

=== Mideast Regional ===
Team	Wins	Losses
SIU Edwardsville	4	0
Wright State	3	2
Eastern Illinois	2	2
Valparaiso	1	2
Evansville	0	2
Western Illinois	0	2

=== South Regional ===
Team	Wins	Losses
Livingston	4	1
Southeastern Louisiana	2	2
Jacksonville State	1	2
Nicholls State	0	2

=== Midwest Regional ===
Team	Wins	Losses
Southeast Missouri State	3	0
Omaha	2	2
Minnesota State	1	2
UMSL	0	2

=== West Regional ===
Team	Wins	Losses
Cal Poly Pomona	3	0
Chapman	2	2
Cal State Northridge	1	2
San Diego	0	2

== Finals ==
=== Participants ===
School	Conference	Record (conference)	Head coach	Previous finals appearances	Best finals finish	Finals record
Cal Poly Pomona	CCAA	40–27–1	John Scolinos	0 (last: none)	none	0–0
Florida Southern	Independent	31–13	Hal Smeltzly	5 (last: 1973)	1st	12–7
Livingston	Gulf South	33–16 (8–7)	Hoss Bowlin	0 (last: none)	none	0–0
Sacred Heart	Independent	22-7-1	Pete DiOrio	0 (last: none)	none	0–0
Southeast Missouri State	MAIAA	28–15	Joe Uhls	0 (last: none)	none	0–0
SIU Edwardsville	Independent	30–21	Roy Lee	1 (last: 1972)	3rd	1–2

=== Results ===
==== Bracket ====
First round
1	Southeast Missouri State	4^{11}
6	Sacred Heart	3
2	Livingston	6^{11}
5	Cal Poly Pomona	5
3	SIU Edwardsville	9
4	Florida Southern	5

Second round
Southeast Missouri State	3
Florida Southern	5
Sacred Heart	1
Cal Poly Pomona	12
Livingston	4
SIU Edwardsville	11
Southeast Missouri State	9
Livingston	7

Third round
Florida Southern	1
Cal Poly Pomona	5
SIU Edwardsville	9
Southeast Missouri State	3

Final
Cal Poly Pomona	6	17
SIU Edwardsville	5	3

==== Game results ====
Game	Winner	Score	Loser	Notes
Game 1	Southeast Missouri State	4–3^{11}	Sacred Heart	
Game 2	Livingston	6–5^{11}	Cal Poly Pomona	
Game 3	SIU Edwardsville	9–5	Florida Southern	
Game 4	Cal Poly Pomona	12–1	Sacred Heart	Sacred Heart eliminated
Game 5	Florida Southern	5–3	Southeast Missouri State	
Game 6	SIU Edwardsville	11–4	Livingston	
Game 7	Southeast Missouri State	9–7	Livingston	Livingston eliminated
Game 8	Cal Poly Pomona	5–1	Florida Southern	Florida Southern eliminated
Game 9	SIU Edwardsville	9–3	Southeast Missouri State	Southeast Missouri State eliminated
Game 10	Cal Poly Pomona	6–5	SIU Edwardsville	
Game 11	Cal Poly Pomona	17–3	SIU Edwardsville	Cal Poly Pomona wins National Championship
