= 1975 NCAA Division II baseball tournament =

- Season: 1975
- Teams: 25
- Finals site: Lanphier Park; Springfield, Illinois
- Champions: Florida Southern (3rd title)
- Runner-up: Marietta (1st CWS Appearance)
- Winning coach: Hal Smeltzly (3rd title)
- MOP: Joe Yazombek (Marietta)

The 1975 NCAA Division II baseball tournament decided the champion of baseball at the NCAA Division II level for the 1975 season. This was the eighth such tournament for the Division, having separated from the University Division in 1957, and further dividing into Division II and Division III for the 1975 season. The Florida Southern won the championship by defeating Marietta.

== Regionals ==
=== Northeast Regional ===
Team	W	L
Montclair State	4	1
Westfield State	4	2
Brandeis	2	2
Le Moyne	1	2
Adelphi	0	2
Central Connecticut	0	2

=== South Atlantic Regional ===
Team	W	L
Florida Southern	4	0
Rollins	3	2
Columbus State	2	2
Lynchburg	1	2
Eckerd	0	2
Valdosta State	0	2

=== Mideast Regional ===
Team	W	L
Marietta	5	1
St. Joseph's (IN)	3	2
Wright State	2	2
SIU Edwardsville	1	2
Eastern Illinois	0	2
Evansville	0	2

=== South Regional ===
Team	W	L
Southeastern Louisiana	3	0
Southern	2	2
Delta State	1	2
Jacksonville State	0	2

=== Midwest Regional ===
Team	W	L
Northwest Missouri State	3	0
UMSL	2	2
Omaha	1	2
South Dakota State	0	2

=== West Regional ===
Team	W	L
Cal State Northridge	3	0
Chapman	2	2
UC Riverside	1	2
Sacramento State	0	2

== Finals ==
=== Participants ===
School	Conference	Record (conference)	Head coach	Previous finals appearances	Best finals finish	Finals record
Florida Southern	Independent	35–10	Hal Smeltzly	4 (last: 1973)	1st	8–6
Marietta	OAC	44–6 (16–0)	Don Schaly	0 (last: none)	none	0–0
Montclair State	NJAC	25–9 (8–2)	Clary Anderson	0 (last: none)	none	0–0
Northwest Missouri State	MAIAA	33–9 (10–2)	Jim Wasem	0 (last: none)	none	0–0
Southeastern Louisiana	Gulf South	25–13 (8–6)	Bob Ricketts	0 (last: none)	none	0–0
Cal State Northridge	CCAA	31–22 (10–6)	Bob Hiegert	2 (last: 1972)	1st	6–3

=== Results ===
Game	Winner	Score	Loser	Notes
Game 1	Montclair State	2–1	Marietta	
Game 2	Florida Southern	4–3	Cal State Northridge	
Game 3	Northwest Missouri State	6–2	Southeastern Louisiana	
Game 4	Marietta	3–1	Cal State Northridge	Cal State Northridge eliminated
Game 5	Southeastern Louisiana	1–0	Montclair State	
Game 6	Florida Southern	2–1	Northwest Missouri State	
Game 7	Marietta	6–1	Northwest Missouri State	Northwest Missouri State eliminated
Game 8	Southeastern Louisiana	5–0	Florida Southern	
Game 9	Florida Southern	2–0	Montclair State	Montclair State eliminated
Game 10	Marietta	9–2	Southeastern Louisiana	Southeastern Louisiana eliminated
Game 11	Florida Southern	10–7	Marietta	Florida Southern wins National Championship

== See also ==
- 1975 NCAA Division I baseball tournament
- 1975 NAIA World Series
