= 1973 NCAA College Division baseball tournament =

1973 baseball tournament

- Season: 1973
- Teams: 21
- Finals site: Lanphier Park; Springfield, Illinois
- Champions: UC Irvine (1st title)
- Runner-up: Ithaca (1st CWS Appearance)
- Winning coach: Gary Adams (1st title)
- MOP: Terry Stupy (UC Irvine)

The 1973 NCAA College Division baseball tournament decided the champion of baseball at the NCAA College Division level for the 1973 season. This was the sixth such tournament for the College Division, having separated from the University Division in 1957. The UC Irvine Anteaters won the championship by defeating the Ithaca Bombers.

== Regionals ==
=== Northeast Region ===
| Team | Wins | Losses |
|---|---|---|
| Ithaca | 5 | 1 |
| Central Connecticut | 3 | 2 |
| Springfield | 2 | 2 |
| Rowan | 1 | 2 |
| New Haven | 0 | 2 |
| Shippensburg | 0 | 2 |

=== Mideast Region ===
| Team | Wins | Losses |
|---|---|---|
| Eastern Illinois | 4 | 0 |
| Marietta | 3 | 2 |
| Indianapolis | 2 | 2 |
| Cleveland State | 1 | 2 |
| North Central | 0 | 2 |
| SIU Edwardsville | 0 | 2 |

=== Midwest Region ===
| Team | Wins | Losses |
|---|---|---|
| UMSL | 3 | 0 |
| Northern Colorado | 2 | 2 |
| South Dakota State | 1 | 2 |
| Northwest Missouri State | 0 | 2 |

=== South Region ===
| Team | Wins | Losses |
|---|---|---|
| Jacksonville State | 3 | 0 |
| New Orleans | 2 | 2 |
| Tuskegee | 1 | 2 |
| Bellarmine | 0 | 2 |

=== South Atlantic Region ===
| Team | Wins | Losses |
|---|---|---|
| Florida Southern | 3 | 0 |
| Rollins | 2 | 2 |
| Eckerd | 1 | 2 |
| Baltimore | 0 | 2 |

=== West Region ===
| Team | Wins | Losses |
|---|---|---|
| UC Irvine | 3 | 1 |
| Cal State Northridge | 1 | 2 |
| Puget Sound | 1 | 2 |

== Finals ==
=== Participants ===
| School | Conference | Record (conference) | Head coach | Previous finals appearances | Best finals finish | Finals record |
|---|---|---|---|---|---|---|
| Eastern Illinois | Independent | 27–13 | Bill McCabe | 0 (last: none) | none | 0–0 |
| Florida Southern | Independent | 27–8 | Hal Smeltzly | 3 (last: 1972) | 1st | 8–4 |
| Ithaca | ICAC | 24–7 (2–0) | Carp Wood | 0 (last: none) | none | 0–0 |
| Jacksonville State | Gulf South | 25–8 (11–2) | Rudy Abbott | 0 (last: none) | none | 0–0 |
| UC Irvine | Independent | 44–12 | Gary Adams | 0 (last: none) | none | 0–0 |
| UMSL | Independent | 24–7 | Fred Nelson | 1 (last: 1972) | 4th | 0–2 |

=== Results ===
==== Bracket ====
First round
Ithaca | 3
Jacksonville State | 2
UC Irvine | 6
UMSL | 2
Eastern Illinois | 9
Florida Southern | 1

Second round
Ithaca | 4
Florida Southern | 1
UC Irvine | 6
Eastern Illinois | 2
Jacksonville State | 1
UMSL | 2

Third round
Ithaca | 0
UC Irvine | 5
Eastern Illinois | 7
UMSL | 5

Semifinals
Ithaca | 3
Eastern Illinois | 2

Final
UC Irvine | 9 | —
Ithaca | 6 | —

==== Game results ====
| Game | Winner | Score | Loser | Notes |
|---|---|---|---|---|
| Game 1 | Ithaca | 3–2 | Jacksonville State | |
| Game 2 | UC Irvine | 6–2 | UMSL | |
| Game 3 | Eastern Illinois | 9–1 | Florida Southern | |
| Game 4 | UMSL | 2–1 | Jacksonville State | Jacksonville State eliminated |
| Game 5 | Ithaca | 4–1 | Florida Southern | Florida Southern eliminated |
| Game 6 | UC Irvine | 6–2 | Eastern Illinois | |
| Game 7 | Eastern Illinois | 7–5 | UMSL | UMSL eliminated |
| Game 8 | UC Irvine | 5–0 | Ithaca | |
| Game 9 | Ithaca | 3–2 | Eastern Illinois | Eastern Illinois eliminated |
| Game 10 | UC Irvine | 9–6 | Ithaca | UC Irvine wins National Championship |

== See also ==
- 1973 NCAA University Division baseball tournament
- 1973 NAIA World Series
