= West Georgia Wolves baseball =

West Georgia Wolves
- 2026 West Georgia Wolves baseball team
- University: University of West Georgia
- Head coach: Jeff Smith (7th season)
- Conference: United Athletic Conference
- Location: Carrollton, Georgia
- Home stadium: Cole Field
- Nickname: Wolves
- Colors: Blue and red

College World Series appearances
- Division II: 1998

NCAA tournament appearances
- Division II: 1977, 1978, 1979, 1982, 1984, 1998, 2016

Conference tournament champions
- Gulf South: 1998

Conference regular season champions
- GSC East Division: 1998

The West Georgia Wolves baseball team is the varsity intercollegiate athletic team of the University of West Georgia in Carrollton, Georgia, United States. The team competes in the National Collegiate Athletic Association's Division I and is a member of the United Athletic Conference since 2024. They will become full members in the 2028 season after finishing the four-year NCAA Division I reclassification period.

== NCAA tournament ==
West Georgia appeared in the NCAA Division II baseball tournament seven times. They went 13–15.

Year	Opponent	Result
1977		2–2
1978		2–2
1979		0–2
1982		1–2
1984	Shippensburg; Longwood	L 7–8; L 11–12 (13)
1998	Tarleton State; Alabama Huntsville; Alabama Huntsville; Alabama Huntsville; CaL State-Chico; Tampa; St. Joseph’s (Mo.); Tampa	W 5–10; W 10–7; L 2–12; W 6–1; W 5–2; L 1–5; W 8–7; L 0–10
2016	Nova Southeastern 11; Claflin; Tampa; West Florida; Delta State	L 4–11; W 7–0; W 4–3; W 7–6; L 5–13
