= 1989 NCAA Division II softball tournament =

- Format: Double-elimination tournament
- Finals site: Sacramento, California
- Champions: Cal State Bakersfield (2nd title)
- Runner-up: Sacramento State (1st title game)
- Winning coach: Kathy Welter (2nd title)
- Attendance: 5,665

The 1989 NCAA Division II softball tournament was the eighth annual postseason tournament hosted by the NCAA to determine the national champion of softball among its Division II members in the United States, held at the end of the 1989 NCAA Division II softball season.

The final, four-team double elimination tournament, also known as the Division II Women's College World Series, was played in Sacramento, California.

Defending champions Cal State Bakersfield defeated hosts Sacramento State in the second, double elimination game of the championship series, 8–5, to capture the Roadrunners' second Division II national title.

== Bracket ==
=== Finals ===
First Round
Central Missouri State	0
Florida Southern	5
Winner's bracket
Sacramento State	0
Cal State Bakersfield	2
Central Missouri State	0
Sacramento State	1
Loser's bracket

Semifinals
Florida Southern	0
Cal State Bakersfield	1
Florida Southern	2
Sacramento State	4

Championship
Cal State Bakersfield	5	8
Sacramento State	6	5

== All-tournament team ==
- Kellie Robinson, 1B, Florida Southern
- Barb Santa Cruz, 2B, CSU Bakersfield
- Patsy Sugo, 2B, Florida Southern
- Lisa Uranday, SS, CSU Bakersfield
- Toni Heisler, SS, Sacramento State
- Lorie Avis, 3B, Sacramento State
- Terri Eagleston, OF, Sacramento State
- Kellie McIntire, OF, Sacramento State
- Tanya Warren, OF, CSU Bakersfield
- Margaret Harvey, P, CSU Bakersfield
- Karen Andreotti, P, Sacramento State
- Leean Couch, C, CSU Bakersfield

== See also ==
- 1989 NCAA Division I softball tournament
- 1989 NCAA Division III softball tournament
- 1989 NAIA softball tournament
- 1989 NCAA Division II baseball tournament
