= Jim Gantner =

American baseball player and coach (born 1953)

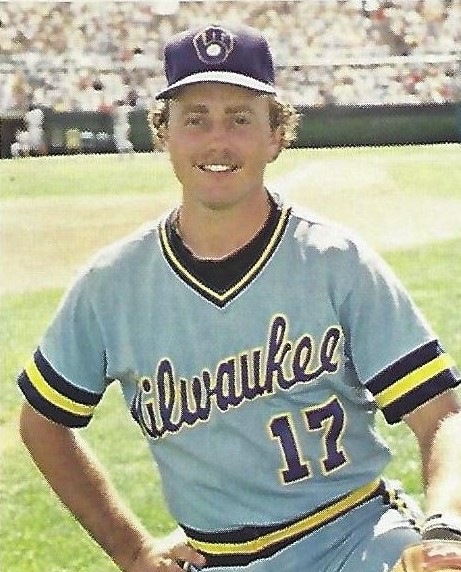
- Gantner in 1983
- Second baseman
- Born: January 5, 1953 (age 73); Fond du Lac, Wisconsin, U.S.
- Batted: Left Threw: Right

MLB debut
- September 3, 1976, for the Milwaukee Brewers

Last MLB appearance
- October 3, 1992, for the Milwaukee Brewers

MLB statistics
- Batting average: .274
- Home runs: 47
- Runs batted in: 568
- Stats at Baseball Reference

Teams
- Milwaukee Brewers (1976–1992)

Career highlights and awards
- Milwaukee Brewers Wall of Honor; American Family Field Walk of Fame

James Elmer Gantner (born January 5, 1953) is an American former Major League Baseball player who spent his entire career with the Milwaukee Brewers (1976–92).

== Background ==
Gantner was born on January 5, 1953, in Fond du Lac, Wisconsin, and grew up in Eden, Wisconsin. He was one of nine children born to Elmer and Erma Gantner. He attended Campbellsport High School in nearby Campbellsport, where he played both baseball and basketball.

He played his college baseball at the University of Wisconsin–Oshkosh (UWO), a small college baseball power in the National Association of Intercollegiate Athletics (NAIA) at the time. While playing two years at UWO, he was All-America honorable mention both seasons, and his teams finished third and fifth in the 1973 and 1974 NAIA World Series. Gantner is in the top four in UWO history in career hits and runs.

Gantner was enshrined into the Wisconsin-Oshkosh Titans' Hall of Fame in 1984, as well as being inducted into the NAIA District 14 Hall of Fame. In 2005, he was inducted into Wisconsin Athletic Hall of Fame. In 2012, Gantner was named to the Wisconsin Intercollegiate Athletic Conference (WIAC) Baseball All-Time Team.

== Baseball career ==
The Milwaukee Brewers selected Gantner in the 12th round of the 1974 Major League Baseball draft (268th overall). Gantner was in the Brewers' minor league system from 1974-1977. Between 1975 and 1976, playing Double-A baseball, his batting average went from .257 to .293. In 1976, he was called up to the majors for the first time and appeared in 26 games for the Brewers. His first at bat was against rookie-of-the-year phenom Mark "the Bird" Fidrych.

He played the majority of the 1977 season at Triple-A Spokane in the Pacific Coast League, where he hit .281, with 15 home runs, 98 runs score and 81 runs batted in (RBI). He was an All-Star three different times in the minor leagues. In 1978, Gantner joined the Brewers for the entire season, and after two years of playing part-time, he started 100 or more games for eight of the next nine years, chiefly playing second base.

Ganter was best known for his consistent play, which culminated after 17 seasons in a respectable .274 career batting average and .985 fielding percentage at second base (.956 in over 300 games at third base). He comprised a stellar infield throughout much of the 1980s beside Hall of Famers Robin Yount at shortstop and Paul Molitor at third base; and five-time All-Star Cecil Cooper at first base. In 1980, Gantner played more games at third base and Molitor played more games at second based, and in 1982, Molitor played center field and Don Money played third base. The Cooper-Gantner-Yount-Molitor infield ended with Yount moving to the outfield in 1985.

Gantner, or "Gumby" as he was affectionately known because of the way he turned double plays, was the Brewers’ second baseman when they won the 1982 American League pennant. He hit a career high .295 that year. Gantner scored the go-ahead and ultimate winning run in the bottom of the seventh inning of the fifth and decisive game of the ALCS, scoring behind Charlie Moore on Cooper's RBI single. The Brewers lost in seven games to the St. Louis Cardinals in the World Series, the franchise's first World Series appearance (they would not return for another 44 years), and did not return to the playoffs for 26 years. Gantner hit .333 in the World Series, with four doubles, one triple, and four RBIs.

In 1983, Ganter had a .282 batting average and career highs in home runs (11), triples (8), runs (85), RBIs (74), OPS (.730), and a .982 field percentage at second base. In 1984, he again hit .282, with a career high 173 hits. Gantner was chosen team MVP in 1984.

Gantner pitched an inning of relief against the Kansas City Royals on August 29, 1979, allowing two hits. Despite the game being a blowout, he was almost ejected for arguing balls and strikes with the umpire.

In his rookie season, Gantner pinch-ran for Hank Aaron in Aaron's final Major League game on October 3, 1976.

Gantner rarely hit home runs (only 47 in a 17 year career). On September 3, 1991, he hit his first home run since 1987, ending a streak of 1,762 at-bats without one. Gantner's last career home run came on August 14, 1992, in the 13th inning, against Boston Red Sox reliever Jeff Reardon. Gantner hit the first pitch into the right field bleachers in Milwaukee County Stadium, giving the Brewers an 8-7 victory.

== Legacy and honors ==
He retired in 1994, after having issues with a torn rotator cuff over his final years. He twice led the American League in double plays and putouts by a second baseman, and once led the league in assists. As of 2025, he has the 16th highest batting average in Brewers' history; the third most games played; the fifth most hits, runs scored, and triples; and the sixth most doubles, among other Brewers' statistics. His 9.9 defensive WAR is the best in team history.

Gantner is a member of the Brewers Wall of Honor. He was elected to the Wisconsin Athletic Hall of Fame in 2005.

== Coaching career ==
Gantner coached several years after he retired as a player, including two years with the Brewers in 1996-1997 under manager Phil Garner. Gantner entered his first season as field manager of the Wisconsin Woodchucks in the Northwoods League in 2007, and managed them in 2008 as well.

== Personal life ==
He was a silent partner of Hale Park Automotive Services in Hales Corners, Wisconsin. He also is employed by the Brewers' organization. Jim also is partial owner of a bar in Eden, Wisconsin, called "Scuds Buds." The bar "Gumby's Pub" in Milwaukee was named for Gantner.

== Career statistics ==
Hitting

G	AB	H	2B	3B	HR	R	RBI	BB	SO	AVG	OBP	SLG	SB
1,801	6,189	1,696	262	38	47	726	568	383	501	.274	.319	.351	137

He had a career .985 fielding percentage at second base and a .956 fielding percentage at third base, his two primary positions.

== See also ==
- List of Major League Baseball players who spent their entire career with one franchise
