= 1984 NCAA Division II softball tournament =

- Format: Double-elimination tournament
- Finals site: Sioux Falls, South Dakota
- Champions: Cal State Northridge (2nd title)
- Runner-up: Akron (1st title game)
- Winning coach: Gary Torgeson (2nd title)
- Attendance: 2,345

The 1984 NCAA Division II softball tournament was the third annual postseason tournament hosted by the NCAA to determine the national champion of softball among its Division II members in the United States, held at the end of the 1984 NCAA Division II softball season.

The final, four-team double elimination tournament, also known as the Division II Women's College World Series, was played in Sioux Falls, South Dakota.

Defending champions Cal State Northridge defeated Akron in the championship game, 1–0, to capture the Matadors' second Division II national title.

== Bracket ==
=== Finals ===
First Round
Sam Houston State	0
Cal State Northridge	1^{8}
Winner's bracket
Akron	0
Sacred Heart	3
Sam Houston State	1
Akron	3
Loser's bracket

Semifinals
Cal State Northridge	2
Sacred Heart	0
Sacred Heart	1
Akron	2^{15}

Championship
Cal State Northridge	1
Akron	0

== All-tournament team ==
- Tracy Gelsinger, 1B, Sacred Heart
- Deann Viebranz, 2B, Akron
- Kay Piper, SS, Akron
- Rose Marie Torma, 3B, Akron
- Barbara Jordan, OF, Cal State Northridge
- Linda Lowande, OF, Cal State Northridge
- Kim Cassidy, OF, Akron
- Dani Vance, P, Akron
- Kathy Slaten, P, Cal State Northridge
- Stacy Lim, C, Cal State Northridge
- Becky Drake, UT, Cal State Northridge
- Debbie Tidy, UT, Sacred Heart

== See also ==
- 1984 NCAA Division I softball tournament
- 1984 NCAA Division III softball tournament
- 1984 NAIA softball tournament
- 1984 NCAA Division II baseball tournament
