= 1972 NAIA World Series =

1972 NAIA baseball tournament
- 1972 NAIA World Series
- Teams: 8
- Format: Double elimination
- Finals site: Phoenix Municipal Stadium; Phoenix, Arizona
- Champions: La Verne (1st title)
- Winning coach: Ben Hines
- MVP: Ben Ochoa (P) (La Verne)

The 1972 NAIA World Series was the 16th annual tournament hosted by the National Association of Intercollegiate Athletics to determine the national champion of baseball among its member colleges and universities in the United States and Canada.

The tournament was played at Phoenix Municipal Stadium in Phoenix, Arizona.

La Verne (44-9) defeated David Lipscomb (35-9) in the first game of the championship series, 4–1, to win the Leopards' first NAIA World Series. La Verne finished the tournament undefeated, 5-0.

La Verne pitcher Ben Ochoa was named tournament MVP.

== Bracket ==
Upper round 1
Frostburg State	1
Oklahoma Christian	0
La Verne	4
Winona State	3
David Lipscomb	13
High Point	1
Lewis (IL)	4
Sam Houston State	3

Upper round 2
Frostburg State	6
La Verne	7
David Lipscomb	3
Lewis	2
Lower round 1
Oklahoma Christian	5
Winona State	3
High Point	4
Sam Houston State	9

Upper final
La Verne	5
David Lipscomb	4
Lower round 2
Lewis	4
Oklahoma Christian	5
Frostburg State	3
Sam Houston State	16

Semifinals
David Lipscomb	7
Oklahoma Christian	1
La Verne	8
Sam Houston State	6

Final
David Lipscomb	1	–
La Verne	4	–

== See also ==
- 1972 NCAA University Division baseball tournament
- 1972 NCAA College Division baseball tournament
