= Jack Smitheran =

Biographical details
- Born: September 1943 (age 83)
- Education: Arizona State

Coaching career (HC unless noted)
- 1969–1972: Kansas State Teachers
- 1974–2004: UC Riverside

Head coaching record
- Overall: 1097–770–3

Accomplishments and honors

Championships
- 2x NCAA Division II tournament (1977, 1982)

Awards
- American Baseball Coaches Association Hall of Fame (2002)

Jack Smitheran is a retired college baseball head coach. He was a member of the Arizona State Sun Devils team that won the 1965 College World Series. He coached Emporia State University's baseball team from 1970-1973 and UC Riverside from 1974-2004. In 2002, he was inducted into the American Baseball Coaches Association Hall of Fame.

== Career achievements ==
Won eight California Collegiate Athletics Association titles

Coached two Division II National Champions (1977 and 1982)

Led teams to 10 NCAA Division II West Regional appearances

1079 career wins

Was an assistant coach for the 2004 USA Baseball National Team that won the Gold Medal at the FISU World University Championships
