= 1984 NAIA World Series =

1984 NAIA baseball tournament
- 1984 NAIA World Series
- Teams: 10
- Format: Double elimination Page playoff
- Finals site: Harris Field; Lewiston, Idaho
- Champions: Lewis–Clark State (1st title)
- Winning coach: Ed Cheff
- MVP: Trace Czyzewski (P) (Lewis–Clark State)

The 1984 NAIA World Series was the 28th annual tournament hosted by the National Association of Intercollegiate Athletics to determine the national champion of baseball among its member colleges and universities in the United States and Canada.

The tournament was played, for the first time, at Harris Field in Lewiston, Idaho.

Emerging from the consolation bracket after losing their first game, hometown team Lewis–Clark State (51–13) defeated Azusa Pacific (39–24) in a single-game championship series, 15–2, to win the Warriors' first NAIA World Series. This would be the beginning of a nineteen-title dynasty for Lewis–Clark State at the NAIA level.

Lewis–Clark State pitcher Trace Czyzewski was named tournament MVP.

== Bracket ==
First round
Georgia College	7
Southwestern (TX)	6
Emporia State	6
Lewis–Clark State	5
Consolation First Round
Dallas Baptist	6
Southwestern (TX)	8
Wilmington (DE)	4
Lewis–Clark State	8

Second round
Anderson (IN)	15
Georgia College	11
USC Coastal Carolina	8
Dallas Baptist	7
Grand View	2
Emporia State	9
Azusa Pacific	23
Wilmington (DE)	2
Consolation Second Round
Grand View	3
Southwestern (TX)	10
Georgia College	4
Lewis–Clark State	13

Third round
Anderson (IN)	2
USC Coastal Carolina	13
Emporia State	1
Azusa Pacific	7
Consolation Third Round
Anderson (IN)	1
Southwestern (TX)	15
Emporia State	2
Lewis–Clark State	11

Fourth round Both teams to championship bracket
USC Coastal Carolina	4
Azusa Pacific	7

Semifinals
1	Azusa Pacific	6
Lewis–Clark State	10
2	USC Coastal Carolina	1
Southwestern (TX)	9

Third place final
Lewis–Clark State	14
Southwestern (TX)	11

Championship final
Azusa Pacific	2
Lewis–Clark State	15

== See also ==
- 1984 NCAA Division I baseball tournament
- 1984 NCAA Division II baseball tournament
- 1984 NCAA Division III baseball tournament
- 1984 NAIA Softball World Series
