= 1989 NCAA Division II baseball tournament =

- Season: 1989
- Finals site: Paterson Field; Montgomery, Alabama
- Champions: Cal Poly San Luis Obispo (vacated)
- Runner-up: New Haven (2nd CWS Appearance)
- Winning coach: Steve McFarland (vacated)
- MOP: Steve DiBartolomeo (P) (New Haven)
- Attendance: 13,084

The 1989 NCAA Division II baseball tournament was the postseason tournament hosted by the NCAA to determine the national champion of baseball among its Division II colleges and universities at the end of the 1989 NCAA Division II baseball season.

The final, eight-team double-elimination tournament was played at Paterson Field in Montgomery, Alabama.

Initially, Cal Poly San Luis Obispo defeated New Haven, 9–5, in the final, claiming the Mustangs' first Division II national title. In 1995, it was found that head coach Steve McFarland funneled money to several players to pay for tuition and housing in the time that he was coach of the team. Cal Poly imposed penalties on itself that meant they would forfeit the 1989 title alongside their status as runner-up in 1993 and third place in 1992, which the NCAA approved. As of 2024, this is the only NCAA Division II championship played without a recognized winner.

== Bracket ==
=== College World Series ===
First Round
Armstrong State	4
Slippery Rock	11
~~Cal Poly San Luis Obispo~~	4
Lewis	8
Armstrong State	7
~~Cal Poly San Luis Obispo~~	11
Jacksonville State	12
New Haven	4
Central Missouri State	3
Rollins	6
New Haven	12
Central Missouri State	4

Second Round
Slippery Rock	14
Lewis	7
Lewis	0
~~Cal Poly San Luis Obispo~~	7
Jacksonville State	6
Rollins	5
Rollins	1
New Haven	7

Semifinals
Slippery Rock	1	6
~~Cal Poly San Luis Obispo~~	6	7
Jacksonville State	2	6
New Haven	5	10

Championship
~~Cal Poly San Luis Obispo~~	9
New Haven	5

== See also ==
- 1989 NCAA Division I baseball tournament
- 1989 NCAA Division III baseball tournament
- 1989 NAIA World Series
- 1989 NCAA Division II softball tournament
