= 1973 NAIA World Series =

1973 NAIA baseball tournament
- 1973 NAIA World Series
- Teams: 8
- Format: Double elimination
- Finals site: Phoenix Municipal Stadium; Phoenix, Arizona
- Champions: United States International (1st title)
- Winning coach: Bob Potter
- MVP: Ken Koske (P) (US International)

The 1973 NAIA World Series was the 17th annual tournament hosted by the National Association of Intercollegiate Athletics to determine the national champion of college baseball among its member colleges and universities in the United States and Canada.

The tournament was played at Phoenix Municipal Stadium in Phoenix, Arizona.

US International Gulls (36-8) defeated Eastern Connecticut Warriors (31-8) in the first game of the championship series, 7–2, to win the Gulls' first NAIA World Series.

US International pitcher Ken Koske was named tournament MVP.

== Bracket ==
Upper round 1
Malone	4
United States International	5
Phillips	4
Valdosta State	3
Eastern Connecticut State	9
Wisconsin–Oshkosh	4
Grand Canyon	3
Pembroke State	1

Upper round 2
United States International	4
Phillips	2
Eastern Connecticut State	7
Grand Canyon	5
Lower round 1
Malone	0
Valdosta State	2
Wisconsin–Oshkosh	3
Pembroke State	1

Upper final
United States International	8
Eastern Connecticut State	1
Lower round 2
Grand Canyon	8
Valdosta State	10
Phillips	0
Wisconsin–Oshkosh	8

Semifinals
Eastern Connecticut State	3
Valdosta State	2
United States International	8
Wisconsin–Oshkosh	5

Final
Eastern Connecticut State	2	–
United States International	7	–

== See also ==
- 1973 NCAA University Division baseball tournament
- 1973 NCAA College Division baseball tournament
