= 1972 NCAA College Division baseball tournament =

U.S. Sports Tournament

- Season: 1972
- Teams: 21
- Finals site: Lanphier Park; Springfield, Illinois
- Champions: Florida Southern (2nd title)
- Runner-up: Valley State (2nd CWS Appearance)
- Winning coach: Hal Smeltzly (2nd title)
- MOP: Jay Smith (Florida Southern)

The 1972 NCAA College Division baseball tournament decided the champion of baseball at the NCAA College Division level for the 1972 season. This was the fifth such tournament for the College Division, having separated from the University Division in 1957. It was also the first held in Springfield, Illinois, having spent the first four years in Springfield, Missouri. The Florida Southern Moccasins won the championship by defeating the Valley State.

== Format ==
Twenty-one teams were selected to participate, divided into four regions. Two regions consisted of six teams, another had five, and the Midwest had four. Each region completed a double-elimination round, with the winners advancing to the finals. The finals, made up of the four regional champions, also competed in a double-elimination format.

== Regionals ==
=== East Regional ===
Team	Wins	Losses
Florida Southern	3	0
New Haven	3	2
Montclair State	2	2
Adelphi	1	2
Old Dominion	1	2
Springfield	0	2

=== Mideast Regional ===
Team	Wins	Losses
SIU Edwardsville	4	1
Marietta	3	2
Valparaiso	3	2
Nicholls State	1	2
Tuskegee	0	2
Union (TN)	0	2

=== Midwest Regional ===
Team	Wins	Losses
UMSL	4	1
Northern Colorado	2	2
Northern Iowa	1	2
Missouri–Rolla	0	2

=== West Regional ===
Team	Wins	Losses
Valley State	4	0
Chapman	2	2
Puget Sound	1	2
UC Irvine	1	2
Cal State Hayward	0	2

== Finals ==
=== Participants ===
School	Conference	Record (conference)	Head coach	Previous finals appearances	Best finals finish	Finals record
Florida Southern	Independent	31–6	Hal Smeltzly	2 (last: 1971)	1st	5–3
UMSL	Independent	23–6	Arnold Copeland	0 (last: none)	none	0–0
Valley State	CCAA	43–20 (20–4)	Bob Hiegert	1 (last: 1971)	1st	4–1
SIU Edwardsville	Independent	31–15–2	Roy Lee	0 (last: none)	none	0–0

=== Results ===
==== Bracket ====
First round
Valley State	7
SIU Edwardsville	6
Florida Southern	10
UMSL	4
Lower round 1
SIU Edwardsville	4
UMSL	1

Semi-finals
Valley State	3
Florida Southern	10
Lower final
Valley State	10
SIU Edwardsville	0

Finals
Florida Southern	0	5
Valley State	3	1

==== Game results ====
Game	Winner	Score	Loser	Notes
Game 1	Valley State	7–6	SIU Edwardsville	
Game 2	Florida Southern	10–4	UMSL	
Game 3	SIU Edwardsville	4–1	UMSL	UMSL eliminated
Game 4	Florida Southern	10–3	Valley State	
Game 5	Valley State	10–0	SIU Edwardsville	SIU Edwardsville eliminated
Game 6	Valley State	3–0	Florida Southern	
Game 7	Florida Southern	5–1	Valley State	Florida Southern wins National Championship

== See also ==
- 1972 NCAA University Division baseball tournament
- 1972 NAIA World Series
