= 1984 NCAA Division III baseball tournament =

- Season: 1984
- Teams: 24
- Finals site: Pioneer Park; Marietta, Ohio
- Champions: Ramapo (1st title)
- Runner-up: Marietta

The 1984 NCAA Division III baseball tournament was played at the end of the 1984 NCAA Division III baseball season to determine the ninth national champion of college baseball at the NCAA Division III level. The tournament concluded with six teams competing at Pioneer Park in Marietta, Ohio, for the championship. Six regional tournaments were held to determine the participants in the World Series. Regional tournaments were contested in double-elimination format, with one region consisting of six teams, four regions consisting of four teams, and one region consisting of two teams, which was played as best-of-five, for a total of 24 teams participating in the tournament. The tournament champion was Ramapo, who defeated Marietta for the championship.

== See also ==
- 1984 NCAA Division I baseball tournament
- 1984 NCAA Division II baseball tournament
- 1984 NCAA Division III softball tournament
- 1984 NAIA World Series
