= The Complex (Valdosta, Georgia) =

Multi-purpose arena in Valdosta, Georgia

Physical Education Complex
- "The Complex"
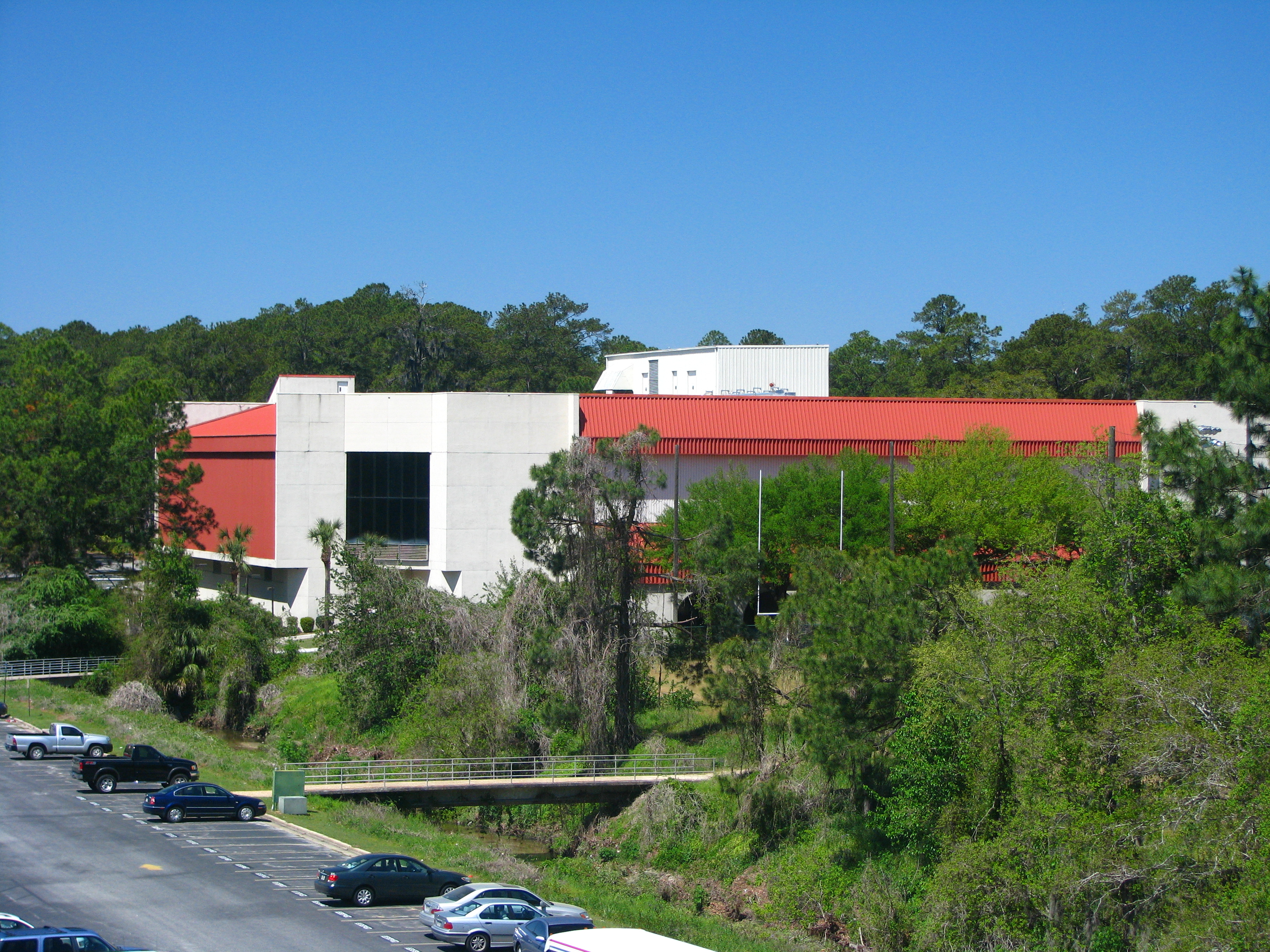
- Interactive map of Physical Education Complex
- Location: Valdosta, Georgia
- Coordinates: 30.845947°N 83.294091°W
- Owner: Valdosta State University
- Capacity: 5,350

Construction
- Groundbreaking: 1979
- Opened: 1983
- Architect: IPG Architects Inc.

Tenants
- Valdosta State Blazers: Men's and Women's Basketball, Indoor Track, Volleyball

The Complex is a 5,350 seat, 105,600 square feet (9,810 m^{2}), multi-purpose arena in Valdosta, Georgia, USA. Construction began in 1979 and was completed in 1982. It is the home of the Valdosta State University Blazers basketball and volleyball teams. The Complex also contains a four lane jogging track and offices for the athletic department, kinesiology, and physical education departments.
