= West Georgia Wolves =

Athletic teams representing the University of West Georgia

- University: University of West Georgia
- Nickname: Wolves (formerly Braves)
- NCAA: Division I (FCS)
- Conference: UAC
- Athletic director: Jason Carmichael
- Location: Carrollton, Georgia
- Varsity teams: 17 (7 men's, 10 women's)
- Football stadium: University Stadium
- Basketball arena: The Coliseum
- Baseball stadium: Cole Field
- Softball stadium: University Softball Field
- Soccer stadium: University Soccer Field
- Colors: Blue and red
- Website: uwgathletics.com

The West Georgia Wolves (UWG Wolves, formerly the West Georgia Braves) are the athletic teams that represent the University of West Georgia, located in Carrollton, Georgia, in NCAA Division I intercollegiate sports. The Wolves compete as members of the United Athletic Conference (UAC) for their 17 varsity sports. West Georgia had been a member of the Gulf South Conference since 1983, until it was announced that it would be joining NCAA Division I as a member of the Atlantic Sun Conference (ASUN) in 2024, with the football team becoming part of the first United Athletic Conference, a football-only joint venture of the ASUN and Western Athletic Conference.

In 2026, the ASUN and WAC reorganized into two separate all-sports entities. The WAC rebranded as the UAC, which mostly consists of schools that award football scholarships. The exceptions are non-football Little Rock and UT Arlington. West Georgia joined the expanded UAC at that time. At the time the reorganization was announced, the ASUN was to consist entirely of schools that do not play scholarship FCS football. The ASUN later announced that Division II upgrader West Florida would move from the Gulf South to the ASUN in 2026 and place football in the all-sports UAC.

== Sports sponsored ==
Men's sports	Women's sports
Baseball	Basketball
Basketball	Beach volleyball
Cross country	Cross country
Football	Golf
Golf	Soccer
Track & field^{1}	Softball
	Stunt (Note: An all-female cheerleading discipline emphasizing acrobatics; part of the NCAA Emerging Sports for Women program. (currently operating as a club sport; to be upgraded to full varsity status at an indeterminate future date).)
	Tennis
	Track & field^{1}
	Volleyball
^{1} – includes indoor and outdoor

=== Athletic achievements ===
- Basketball: holds one National Association of Intercollegiate Athletics (NAIA) National Championship in 1974.
- Co-ed cheerleading: holds eight consecutive UCA Division II titles 2002-2009 and 15 total UCA division II titles for 2011, 2014, 2015, 2016, 2017, 2018, 2019 wins.
- All-female cheerleading: has earned 6 UCA Division II National Championships in 2004, 2006, 2007, 2008, 2011, 2012. And 3 UCA Division I National Championships in 2013, 2017 and 2019.

== Cross country ==
Tim Brooks, former member of the 1999 Gulf South Conference Championship men's cross country team, was named head coach of the men's and women's teams in 2010. Coach Ryan Bailey took over the Head Coaching position in 2017.

== Softball ==
West Georgia's softball team appeared in one Women's College World Series in 1974.

== Men's basketball ==
The University of West Georgia men's basketball program has been a contender in the Gulf South since joining in 1983. They have had 40 players named to the All Gulf South Teams, 17 players named to NCAA All-American Teams, Appeared in 27 Gulf South Conference Tournaments, and 18 NCAA Tournaments. The 1974 team, coached by Roger Kaiser, won the NAIA National Championship.

== Facilities ==
=== University Stadium ===
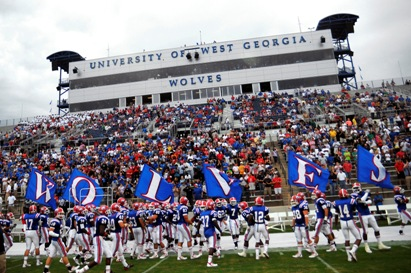
Home side of University Stadium.

In 2003, the University of West Georgia acquired 250 acres (1.0 km^{2}) from the city of Carrollton for the purpose of creating a stadium and athletic complex. Such a facility would serve a dual role: give the UWG sports teams a facility that they could use, and aid the university in attracting additional students. The funding for this venture was made possible through private donations and increased student fees approved by the Student Government Association.

During the summer of 2008, construction began on this facility and, in the fall of 2009, the University Stadium opened. The stadium seats roughly 9,600, providing ample space for any sporting or entertainment event. Additionally, the new athletic complex includes a stadium and practice field for the Wolves’ soccer program, a new softball stadium and a women's field house with locker-room facilities for women's sports. There are plans to relocate Cole Field from its current location beside the Biology Building to the Athletic Complex.

On October 4, 2014, the University Stadium hosted its first Top-25 matchup in its 6-year history. The game was between the then #24 UWG Wolves and the #22 UWA Tigers. It was the first time that Coach Will Hall faced his former team. The final scored showed just how tough of a game it would be as UWG edged out UWA 26–17. It was UWG's first win in the series after 5 previous tries.

=== The Coliseum ===
The Coliseum is an on-campus indoor arena in Carrollton, Georgia. It is primarily used for basketball and volleyball, and is the home field of the University of West Georgia. The arena holds 6,475 spectators and opened in 2009. The total construction cost was $24.7 million.

The concourse level of the facility includes a two-story lobby that offers an area for event pre-function gatherings. The concourse level also features concession stands and restrooms.

The lower level of the facility houses the floor of the arena, spacious locker rooms for the men and women basketball teams, the volleyball team, visiting teams, and referees. Additionally, this level includes a trainer's facility. The Coliseum has a maple wood floor surrounded by seating and a four-sided, state-of-the-art video scoreboard suspended over center court.

The upper level includes three large skyboxes for UWG officials, boosters, and friends to gather during events.

The Coliseum hosts UWG commencement ceremonies, concerts, and other various events. The Georgia High School Association Class AAAAA and AAAA boys' and girls' basketball quarterfinal round of the playoffs are also held at this facility annually.

In July 2021, the Coliseum floor was redone in accordance with the change in the three-point line for NCAA Basketball contests. The new design and finishing was done by CBA Sports, a company led by NBA legend Dominique Wilkins.
