= Gary Adams (baseball) =

American baseball coach

Biographical details
- Born: September 4, 1939 (age 87); Hamilton, Ohio, U.S.
- Education: UCLA

Playing career
- 1959–1962: UCLA Bruins
- Position: Second base

Coaching career (HC unless noted)
- 1965–1968: UC Riverside (asst.)
- 1970–1974: UC Irvine
- 1975–2004: UCLA

Head coaching record
- Overall: 1169-891-12

Accomplishments and honors

Championships
- 2x Division II National Championships (1973, 1974); 1x Division I College World Series Appearance (1997); 11x Division I NCAA tournament Appearances (1979, 1986, 1987, 1990, 1992, 1993, 1996, 1997, 1999, 2000, 2004); 5x Division II NCAA tournament Appearances (1970, 1971, 1972, 1973, 1974); 3x Pac-8/Pac-10 South Division Titles (1976, 1979, 1986); 1 Pac-10 Title (2000)

Awards
- 1x Division II Coach of the Year Award (1974); 2x Division II District VIII Coach of the Year Awards (1973, 1974); 1x Pac-10 Coach of the Year Award (2004); 2x Pac-10 South Coach of the Year Awards (1979, 1986)

Gary Adams (born September 4, 1939) is an American former college baseball coach who served as the head baseball coach of the UCLA Bruins from 1975 to 2004. He also served as the first head coach at UC Irvine from 1970 to 1974, winning two Division II national championships there.

Adams attended UCLA, where he played baseball from 1959 to 1962. After his playing career, Adams was an assistant coach at UC Riverside from 1965 to 1968 before becoming a head coach.

== Coaching career ==
Adams was named the first head coach of the Division II UC Irvine baseball program prior to the 1970 season. Under Adams, the Anteaters reached the Division II NCAA tournament in each of the program's first five seasons. In both 1973 and 1974, the team advanced to the College World Series and won the Division II National Championship.

Adams replaced Art Reichle as the head coach at UCLA following the 1974 season. Adams coached at UCLA for 30 seasons, appearing in 11 NCAA tournaments and the 1997 College World Series. Adams retired following the 2004 season and was replaced by then-UC Irvine head coach John Savage.

Adams has coached future big league greats such as Eric Karros, Todd Zeile, Troy Glaus, Chase Utley, Eric Byrnes and Casey Janssen.

== Head coaching record ==
Record table
Season	Team	Overall	Conference	Standing	Postseason
Independent (College Division) (1970–1973)
1970	UC Irvine	33–12–3			NCAA Regional
1971	UC Irvine	27–17–1			NCAA Regional
1972	UC Irvine	33–19–1			NCAA Regional
1973	UC Irvine	44–12			College World Series
Independent (1974–1974)
1974	UC Irvine	48–8			College World Series
UC Irvine:		185–68–5			
UCLA (Pacific-10 Conference) (1975–2004)
1975	UCLA	31–22	7–11	3rd (South)	
1976	UCLA	35–25	16–8	1st (South)	Pac-8 Tournament
1977	UCLA	31–30	10–8	2nd (South)	
1978	UCLA	39–20	9–9	2nd (South)	
1979	UCLA	43–18	21–9	1st (South)	West Regional
1980	UCLA	31–22–3	15–15	t-3rd (South)	
1981	UCLA	21–35	7–23	6th (South)	
1982	UCLA	38–27	11–19	4th (South)	
1983	UCLA	28–24–1	12–18	5th (South)	
1984	UCLA	28–32	8–22	6th (South)	
1985	UCLA	34–30–1	13–17	5th (South)	
1986	UCLA	39–23	21–9	1st (South)	West Regional (National Seed)
1987	UCLA	40–25–1	16–14	2nd (South)	West II Regional
1988	UCLA	31–28	12–18	5th (South)	
1989	UCLA	27–32	10–20	5th (South)	
1990	UCLA	41–26	14–16	4th (South)	Midwest Regional
1991	UCLA	29–30	13–17	4th (South)	
1992	UCLA	37–26	14–16	3rd (South)	Mideast Regional
1993	UCLA	37–23	17–13	2nd (South)	Central I Regional
1994	UCLA	22–36	11–19	5th (South)	
1995	UCLA	29–28	12–8	5th (South)	
1996	UCLA	36–28	16–14	3rd (South)	Central I Regional
1997	UCLA	45–21–1	19–11	2nd (South)	College World Series
1998	UCLA	24–33	11–19	5th (South)	
1999	UCLA	31–33	13–11	T–3rd	Wichita Regional
2000	UCLA	38–26	17–7	t-1st	Baton Rouge Super Regional
2001	UCLA	30–27	9–15	7th	
2002	UCLA	26–35	9–15	7th	
2003	UCLA	28–31	11–13	t-5th	
2004	UCLA	35–29	14–10	t-3rd	Oklahoma City Regional
UCLA:		984–823–7	388–424		
Total:		1169-891-12			
National champion Postseason invitational champion Conference regular season champion Conference regular season and conference tournament champion Division regular season champion Division regular season and conference tournament champion Conference tournament champion

== Personal life ==
After spending 41 years coaching college baseball, Gary retired. Following retirement, Gary and his wife, Sandy, have published childrens books and grown Syrah grapes for wine. Currently, The Adams’ are in their tenth season of producing estate Syrah and third season of Malbec. Adams has five children's books available, as well as the hard cover book, "Conversations With Coach Wooden," a book of stories about the coach and person friend to Adams, John Wooden.

Adams has five daughters, Kristy, Kimberly and Katherine (previous marriage); Jessica and Audrey.

== Notes ==
- Adams has written number of books, including Conversations with Coach Wooden, and children's books, The Ladybug Story, So Flat, So Deep, So Far, and The Little Clock Who Had No Hands.

== See also ==
- List of college baseball career coaching wins leaders
