= Joe Arnold =

American college and baseball coach (born 1947)

Biographical details
- Born: February 26, 1947 (age 79); Daytona Beach, Florida, U.S.
- Education: Miami-Dade Community, A.A. Florida Atlantic University, B.A. Arizona State University, M.A.

Playing career
- 1966–1967: Miami-Dade
- 1968: Arizona State
- 1968–1969: Houston Astros
- Positions: Pitcher, shortstop, second baseman

Coaching career (HC unless noted)
- 1977–1983: Florida Southern
- 1984–1994: Florida
- 1997–1998: Oneonta Yankees
- 1999–2000: Staten Island Yankees
- 2007–2010: Polk State

Accomplishments and honors

Championships
- NCAA Division II (1978, 1981); Sunshine State Conference (1980, 1981, 1982, 1983); Southeastern Conference (1984, 1988); SEC Tournament (1984, 1988, 1991)

Awards
- Division II Coach of the Year (1978, 1981); SEC Coach of the Year (1984, 1988)
- College Baseball Hall of Fame; Inducted in 2015

Joseph A. Arnold (born February 26, 1947) is an American former college and professional baseball coach. During his twenty-four seasons as a head coach, Arnold led the college baseball teams at Florida Southern College, the University of Florida, and Polk State College, and also served as the manager of two Class A minor league teams within the New York Yankees organization. Arnold was inducted into the National College Baseball Hall of Fame in Lubbock, Texas in March 2015.

== Early years ==
Arnold was born in Daytona Beach, Florida. He attended Lake Worth High School in Lake Worth, Florida, where he was a pitcher for the Lake Worth Trojans high school baseball team.

== Playing career ==
He attended Miami-Dade Community College, where he was a standout pitcher for the MDCC baseball team, and was recognized as a junior college All-American in 1966 and 1967. After he exhausted his junior college eligibility, he transferred to Arizona State University in Tempe, Arizona, where he played for the Arizona State Sun Devils baseball team in 1968.

Following the 1968 college season, the Houston Astros selected Arnold in the third round (55th pick overall) of the 1968 MLB draft. He appeared in 114 games while playing for four different Class A affiliates of the Astros in 1968 and 1969; in two seasons, he batted .221 and won his only appearance as a pitcher.

== Coaching career ==
From 1977 to 1983, Arnold was the head coach of the Florida Southern Moccasins baseball team of Florida Southern College in Lakeland, Florida. In seven seasons, he led the Mocs baseball team to an overall win–loss record of 316–69 (.821), four Sunshine State Conference (SSC) championships (1980, 1981, 1982, 1983), six consecutive appearances in the Division II College World Series, two Division II national championships (1978, 1981) and two national second-place finishes (1979, 1982).

From 1980 to 1983, Arnold managed the Wareham Gatemen, a collegiate summer baseball team in the prestigious Cape Cod Baseball League.

Arnold was the head coach of the Florida Gators baseball team at the University of Florida in Gainesville, Florida, from 1984 to 1994. In eleven seasons, Arnold coached the Gators to an overall win–loss record of 434–244–2 (.640), two Southeastern Conference (SEC) championships (1984, 1988), three SEC tournament titles (1984, 1988, 1991), seven appearances in the Division I baseball tournament, and the program's first two appearances in the College World Series (1988, 1991). He was twice chosen by his fellow coaches as the SEC Coach of the Year (1984, 1988).

Arnold managed the Oneonta Yankees in 1997 and 1998, and the Staten Island Yankees in 1999 and 2000; both teams were the Yankees affiliates in the Class A New York–Penn League. In four seasons managing Single-A baseball, he compiled a record of 179–119 (.601), his Yankees teams finished first or second in the standings three of four years, and won the league championship twice. Thereafter, he continued as the director of East Coast scouting for the parent New York Yankees.

Not ready to retire, Arnold became the head coach of his third college baseball team in 2007, accepting the opportunity to coach the Polk State Vikings of Polk State College in Winter Haven, Florida. He coached the Vikings for four seasons, until health concerns forced him to step down after the 2010 season.

== Personal ==
Arnold and his wife Beverly have two children, a son and a daughter.

== Head coaching record ==
Record table
Season	Team	Overall	Conference	Standing	Postseason
Florida Southern Moccasins (Sunshine State Conference) (1977–1983)
1977	Florida Southern	34–11			NCAA South Regional
1978	Florida Southern	41–8			College World Series champions
1979	Florida Southern	40–12	10–5	1st	College World Series runners up
1980	Florida Southern	45–11	11–4	1st	College World Series
1981	Florida Southern	55–8	10–5	1st	College World Series champions
1982	Florida Southern	50–11	19–2	1st	College World Series runners up
1983	Florida Southern	51–8	14–3	1st	College World Series
Florida Southern:		316–69	64–19		
Florida Gators (Southeastern Conference) (1984–1994)
1984	Florida	43–16–1	18–4	1st (East)	NCAA South I Regional
1985	Florida	43–18	15–6	1st (East)	NCAA Atlantic Regional
1986	Florida	27–26	14–13	6th	
1987	Florida	32–24	17–9	3rd	
1988	Florida	48–19–1	21–6	1st	College World Series
1989	Florida	44–22	14–10	3rd	NCAA East Regional
1990	Florida	29–30	11–12	6th	
1991	Florida	51–21	16–8	2nd	College World Series
1992	Florida	44–20	16–8	1st (East)	NCAA East Regional
1993	Florida	33–25	12–14	3rd (East)	
1994	Florida	40–23	16–9	2nd (East)	NCAA Atlantic I Regional
Florida:		434–244–2	170–99		
Total:					
National champion Postseason invitational champion Conference regular season champion Conference regular season and conference tournament champion Division regular season champion Division regular season and conference tournament champion Conference tournament champion

== See also ==
- Arizona State Sun Devils
- Florida Gators
- Florida Southern Moccasins
- History of the University of Florida
