= Frank Vieira =

American baseball coach

Frank Vieira is a retired college baseball head coach who coached the University of New Haven team from 1963 to 2006. Vieira is the most successful coach in NCAA Division II baseball with 1,127 wins. During his coaching years with New Haven, he took the team to 17 College World Series.

== See also ==
- List of college baseball career coaching wins leaders
