= Valdosta State Blazers =

- University: Valdosta State University
- Nickname: Blazers
- NCAA: Division II
- Conference: Gulf South
- Athletic director: Tony Katen
- Location: Valdosta, Georgia
- Varsity teams: 14 (6 men's, 8 women's)
- Football stadium: Bazemore-Hyder Stadium
- Basketball arena: PE Complex
- Baseball stadium: Billy Grant Field at Tommy Thomas Park
- Softball stadium: Steel's Diamond
- Soccer stadium: Soccer Complex
- Colors: Red and black
- Mascot: Blaze
- Fight song: VSU Fight Song
- Website: vstateblazers.com
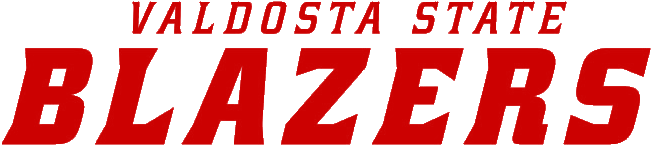

Team NCAA championships
- 11

The Valdosta State Blazers are the athletic teams that represent the Valdosta State University, located in Valdosta, Georgia, in intercollegiate sports at the Division II level of the National Collegiate Athletic Association (NCAA). The Blazers have primarily competed in the Gulf South Conference since the 1981–82 academic year.

Valdosta State competes in twelve intercollegiate varsity sports. Men's sports include baseball, basketball, cross country, football, golf, and tennis; while women's sports include basketball, cross country, soccer, softball, tennis, and volleyball.

== Conference affiliations ==
NCAA

- Gulf South Conference (1981–2027)
- Peach Belt Conference (2027–future)

== Varsity teams ==
Men's sports	Women's sports
Baseball	Basketball
Basketball	Cross country
Cross country	Soccer
Football	Softball
Golf	Tennis
Tennis	Volleyball

=== Baseball ===
The first baseball team at Valdosta State was formed in 1954 and had its first official season of intercollegiate competition in 1955. The first coach was Walter Cottingham, and the college was first a member of the Georgia Conference. In 1959, Gary Colson became baseball coach, he would later serve as the Valdosta State basketball coach. Billy Grant became coach in 1960 and the Blazer baseball home field is named in his honor due to his success. Tommy Thomas, became coach in 1967 and served as coach until 2007. Under Thomas the blazers saw 34 winning seasons, two conference title, three Divisional titles, eight trips to the national tournament, and a Division II national championship in 1979. Tommy Thomas is the all-time wins leader in NCAA Division II baseball with 1302 wins. Greg Guilliams became VSU's head baseball coach in 2008 and won a Gulf South Conference East Division title in his first year and led Valdosta State to its first postseason appearance in seven years. The Valdosta State baseball team was the 2010 GSC Champions.

=== Basketball ===
==== Men's basketball ====
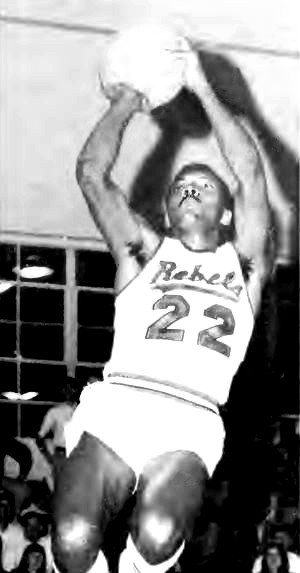
Pete Smith of Valdosta State during the 1968–69 season

The men's Basketball Team at Valdosta State, was formed and played its first season in 1955 as the 'Rebels'. Walter Cottingham was the Valdosta State basketball coach and led the team until 1958.

Gary Colson took over as coach in 1959, that same year VSC began playing in the GIAC. During his tenure the Rebels placed first in the conference multiple times and Colson holds the highest winning percentage of any Valdosta State basketball coach at .707.

In 1968, coach Jimmy Melvin took over with continued success at VSC. In 1971 James Dominey became coach. After 1972 Valdsota State changed its mascot from the 'Rebels' to the 'Blazers'. In 1973 the Blazers upset three-time defending champions Kentucky State in the first round of the NAIA tournament. T Dominey served as coach until 2000 and after 29 year hold the most wins of any Valdosta State basketball coach.

Jim Yarbrough served as coach from 2001 to 2005. Mike Helfer became the head basketball coach at VSU in 2006 and led the Blazers to a Gulf South Conference East Division title in 2008–2009, VSU's first-ever NCAA Men's Basketball South Regional Title, and their first appearance in the Division II Elite-Eight in 2009–2010.

==== Women's basketball ====
The Lady Blazers basketball team began in 1975, although intramural women's basketball has been strong at VSC back to the 30s during its days as GSWC. Lyndal Worth was the first coach of the new team. During Worth's tenure, the Lady Blazers were the GAIAW Division I Champions in 1977 and 1978, GAIAW Division I Runner-up in 1976 and 1979, and AIAW South Regional Champion in 1978 and 1979.

Charles Cooper became the Lady Blazers coach in 1982 after having served as the girls' basketball coach at nearby Lowndes High School. While at Lowndes, Cooper won 122 straight games and was undefeated from 1976 to 1980. During those four years, the Lowndes Vikettes were the state and national champions. In 1983 and 1984 the Lady Blazers won the Gulf South Conference Championship and were the NCAA Division II South Regional Champions. Also in 1984, Cooper's team reached the NCAA Division II Final Four.

Jane Williamson became the head coach in 1995. Under Williamson the Valdosta State team were the Gulf South Conference East Division Champions in 1995 and 1997, and runner-up in 1999. Yevette Sparks led the Lady Blazers for the 2000 season and Kiley Hill took over in 2001. Since Hill came to VSU the Lady Blazers have had nine straight winning seasons, ten trips to the Gulf South Conference tournament, three East Division titles, six 20-win seasons and six trips to the Division II national tournament. The Lady Blazers were also the GSC East champions in 2004–05, 2006–07 and 2009–10, and reached the NCAA Division II Sweet 16 in 2008 and 2012.

In 2010 after the Lady Blazers won the GSC East Championship VSU head coach Kiley Hill was recognized as the GSC East Coach of the Year. The Gulf South Conference rewarded coach Hill for his winning consistency when it named him the conference's Women's Basketball Coach of the Decade for 2000–2009. In 2012, Hill was also named the South Region's Coach of the Year by the Women's Basketball Coaches’ Association after his team made it to the South Regional Tournament Championship.

=== Cross country ===
The Valdosta State cross country team was initiated in 1972, with Dave Waples as the coach. The team won four consecutive South Atlantic Conference titles (1975–1978), also winning the State Championship in 1976 and 1978. The Blazers had consecutive NCAA National finishes of 17th (1975), 8th (1976 and 1977), prior to grabbing third place in the 1978 Nationals, going 50–3 on the year. "Jersey Joe" Germano is listed as the school's all-time best runner, earning All-America honors in 1976 and 1977. The sport was dropped at the conclusion of the 1978 season, with Waples tabbed to help begin an intercollegiate football team for VSU. X-C was revived for the 1982 season, with a women's team added later. (cite VSC Cross-Country History, 1972–78). Both Valdosta State's men's and women's cross country squads placed in the top 10 in the NCAA Southeast Regional Cross Country Championships in 2009.

=== Football ===
The Valdosta state football program began in 1981 and has been led by eight head coaches. The Blazers won the 2018 NCAA Division II National Football Championship beating the Ferris State Bulldogs 49–47. The Blazers also won the 2012 NCAA Division II National Football Championship beating Winston-Salem State University 35–7. VSU won the 2007 national championship by defeating Northwest Missouri State University 25–20, with coach David Dean, being only the second head coach to lead his team to a national championship in his first season (2007). Earle Solomonson accomplished this at North Dakota State University in 1985.

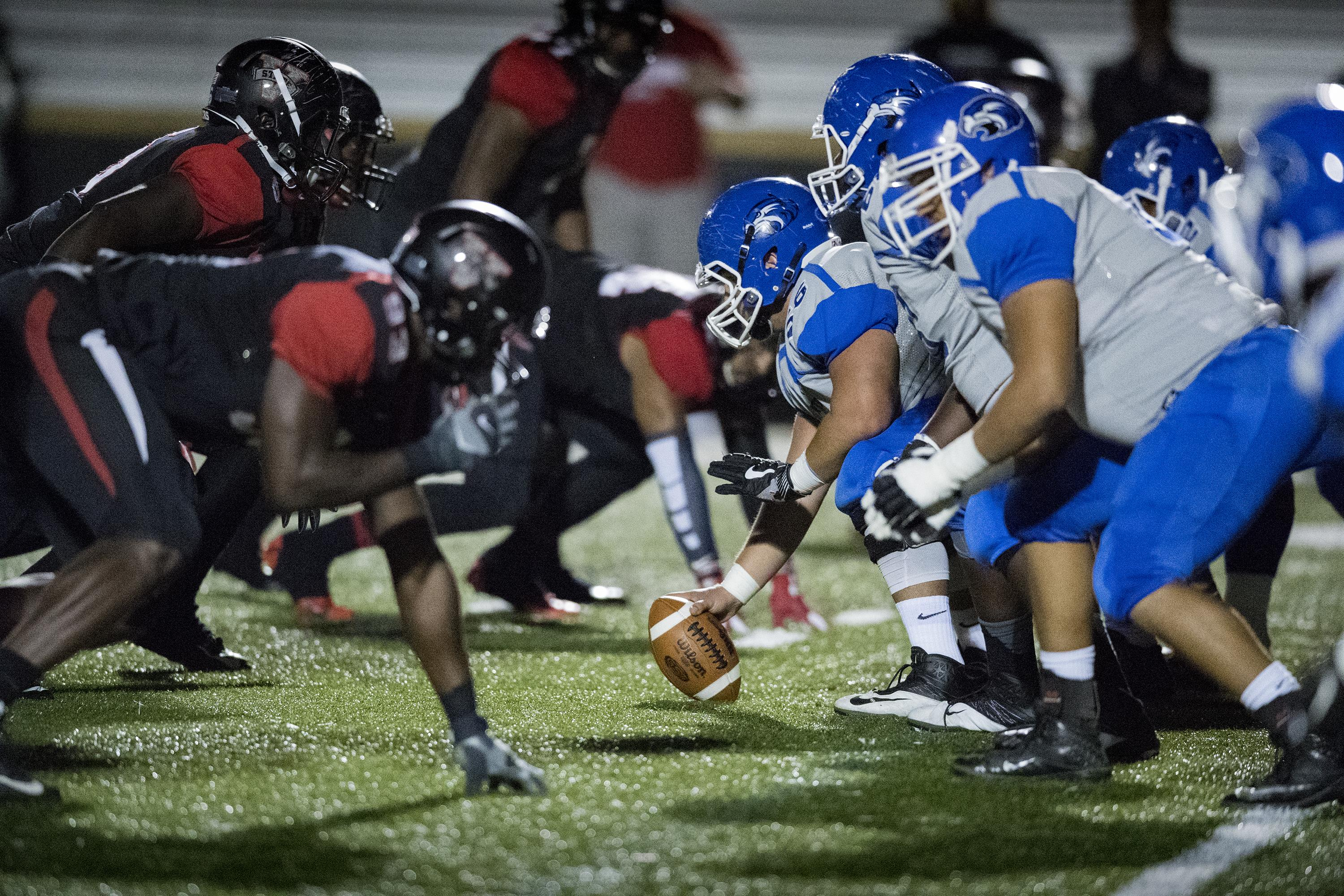
Valdosta v Shorter football game in 2016

The Blazers also won the 2004 national championship with a 36–31 win over Pittsburg State University. The Blazers lost to Grand Valley State University 31–24 in the 2002 NCAA Division II national championship. The Blazers also have won 9 Gulf South Conference football championships (1996, 2000, 2001, 2002, 2004, 2010, 2018, 2019, 2021*). *Co-champions with the University of West Florida.

Two notable alumni are Jessie Tuggle, National Football League linebacker from 1987 to 2000 playing his entire career with the Atlanta Falcons, and Chris Hatcher was quarterback in the programs first national football tournament in 1994 and was that year's Harlon Hill Trophy winner. Hatcher was also Valdosta State's head football coach from 2000 to 2006 and amassed a 68–10 record with one national championship and four conference crowns during his six-year tenure at Valdosta State.

=== Golf ===
The VSU Golf program began in 1984. The team has appeared in the NCAA Championship 11 times, and Briny Baird was the NCAA Champion in 1994 and 1995. The Blazers have also made the Gulf South Conference Championships in 1994, 1996, 1999, and 2000, and to GSC Individual Championships in 1989, 1990, 1992, 1994, and 2007.

=== Soccer ===
Valdosta State University added women's soccer to its sports roster in September 2009. Melissa Heinz was named the first VSU soccer coach on January 28, 2010. Heinz had also been the inaugural coach of Division I Winthrop University. Coaching for seven seasons Heinz was named NCAA Division I Coach of the Year for first year programs by the National Soccer Coaches Association after leading her 2003 team to a 7–12–1 record in 2003.

The team opened its first season September 1, 2011 against Georgia Southwestern State University. Soccer was the 12th intercollegiate sport sponsored by Valdosta State, and the sixth women's team. In their first season the lady Blazers went 11–6–2 Overall and 5–1–1 in the Gulf South Conference.

=== Softball ===
The Valdosta State Lady Blazers won the 2012 NCAA Division II softball championship, the first in VSU and Gulf South Conference history, beating UC San Diego 4–1. The Lady Blazers finished their season with a 58–5 record. The VSU softball team also set the GSC record with a 36 consecutive game winning streak. VSU's Morgan Johnson won the Gulf South Commissioner's Trophy, the highest honor bestowed by the Conference for the 2011–12 academic year following the Blazers national title. Johnson was first VSU women's Commissioner's Trophy honoree since 1996–97 and the first VSU softball player to win the honor.

In 2010 VSU made its first appearance in the Division II national softball tournament and fell 4–3 in the national championship to Hawaii Pacific, finishing their season with a 51–9 record. In 2009 the Lady Blazers finished with a 57–8 season and broke 16 school records, including most wins in a season, most runs (503), hits (638), runs batted in (452), and home runs (98).

Valdosta State is the only softball team in the Gulf South Conference to win five consecutive championships (2009, 2010, 2011, 2012, 2013).

The Lady Blazer Softball Team began in 1992 under head coach Ron Durante. Thomas Macera has been the head softball coach since 2006. Macera attended Valdosta State and was an assistant coach at VSU under Durante in the 1990s. Macera became the winningest coach in Valdosta State softball history in 2012 passing Durante's record of 303 wins. In his six seasons in Valdosta, Macera has never won less than 41 games and has won 50-plus games on three separate occasions. In 2012 head coach Macera and assistant coaches Stephanie Carlson, Lindsay Campana and Jordon Yost were named the National Fastpitch Coaches’ Association's Division II National Coaching Staff of the Year. Macera also won the GSC Coach of the Year in 2007 and the South Region Coaching Staff of the Year award in 2012.

=== Tennis ===
Valdosta State University's men's tennis team won the 2025 NCAA Division II national championship with a 4–2 win over Washburn University. The championship marks back-to-back titles for Valdosta State, the program's fourth. Valdosta State clinched the 2024 title after defeating Flagler College, 4-3. The men's tennis team won the 2011 championship with a 5–2 win over Barry University. The Blazers also won the 2006 national title after defeating Lynn University 5–2 and finishing the season undefeated. The Blazers played for the national championship in 2004, 2007, and 2010.

The blazers finished as one of the top two teams in the Gulf South Conference every year from 1994 to 2012. The men's team has nine conference championships (1996, 2000, 2001, 2004, 2007, 2008, 2009, 2010, 2011), tied with the University of West Florida women's team for the most conference championships in the GSC. In 2011 the men's team became the first to win five consecutive GSC Championships in tennis.

Valdosta State University's Women's Tennis Team were the Gulf South Conference champions in 2005, 2008, and 2010. The Lady Blazers appeared in the Division II Tennis Final Four in 2004 and 2008.

John Hansen has been the head coach of both the men and women's tennis teams at Valdosta for 41 years. Hansen has been named Gulf South Conference Coach of the Year 15 times, eleven as the men's coach and four as the women's head coach.

=== Volleyball ===
Lady Blazer volleyball was restarted in 1995 after a 15-year hiatus. In the inaugural season under coach Paul Cantrell the Lady Blazers went 13–17, and improving to 15–16 in 1996. In 2005 Sia Poyer took over as coach and in 2006 led the team to the Gulf South Conference Tournament for the first time since 2000.

=== Spirit squads ===
==== Red Hots ====
The Valdosta State Dance Team, known as the VSU Red Hots, have been the NDA National Champions in the Division II Open Dance Competition in 2008, 2009, 2010, and 2019. In 2011 the Red Hots won their first national championship in the Hip Hop division and placed second in the Open division.

==== Cheer ====
The Valdosta State cheerleading squad won the co-ed national championship in 2009 and 2010 and the national title in the All Girl division in 2011 at the NCA/NDA Collegiate Cheer and Dance National Championships in Daytona Beach, Florida.

== National championships ==
Since 1979 Valdosta State University teams have won 10 NCAA national championships and appeared in 17 title matches across 4 sports.

Year	Sport	Outcome
1979	Baseball	win
2002	Football	loss
2004	Football	win
2004	Men's Tennis	loss
2006	Men's Tennis	win
2007	Men's Tennis	loss
2007	Football	win
2010	Men's Tennis	loss
2010	Softball	loss
2011	Men's Tennis	win
2012	Softball	win
2012	Football	win
2014	Softball	loss
2018	Football	win
2024	Football	loss
2024	Men's Tennis	win
2025	Men's Tennis	win
17 appearances	4 sports	10-7

== TitleTown USA ==
TitleTown USA was a month-long segment on ESPN that started in the Spring of 2008 and continued through July. Fans nominated towns and cities across the country based on their championship pedigree. A panel reviewed the nominees and fan voting in May determined the 20th finalist. SportsCenter visited each city in July, and fan voting July 23–27 determined the winner. Based on online fan voting, Valdosta, Georgia was the winning city of TitleTown USA. Valdosta State's numerous national, conference, and division titles in multiple sports were a major reason the city of Valdosta won the vote to be named "TitleTown, USA".

== Facilities ==
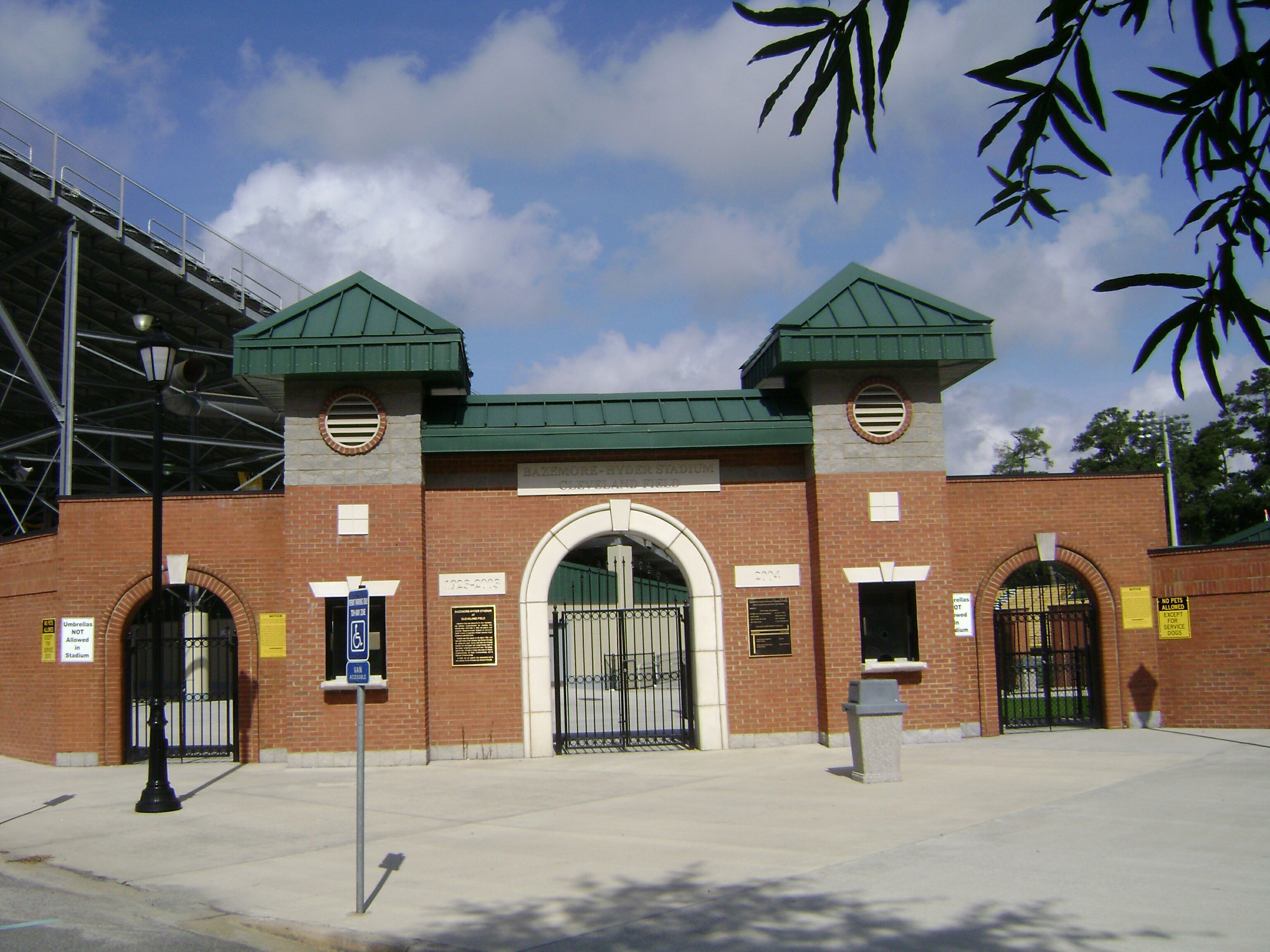
Bazemore–Hyder Stadium

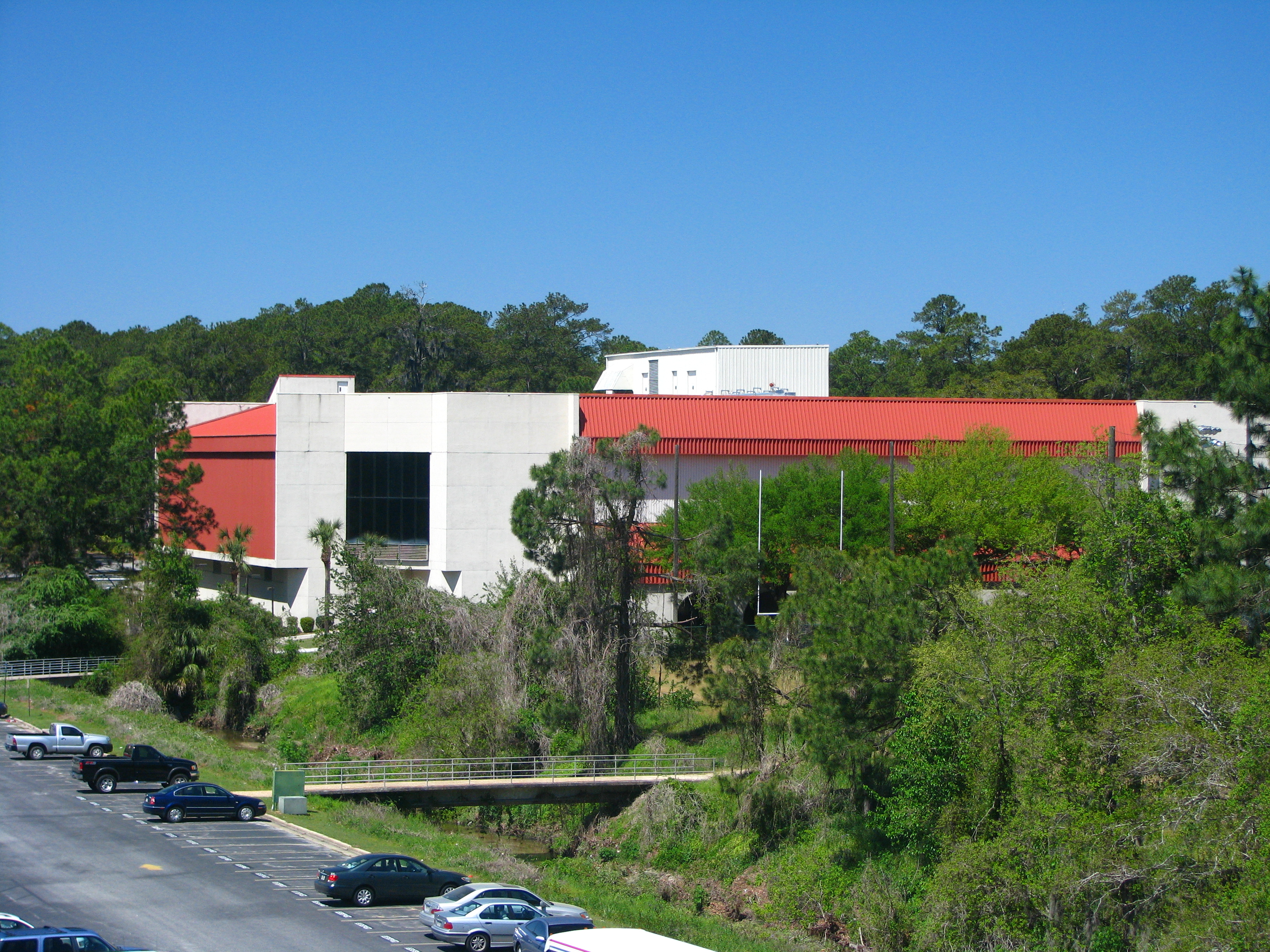
VSU PE Complex

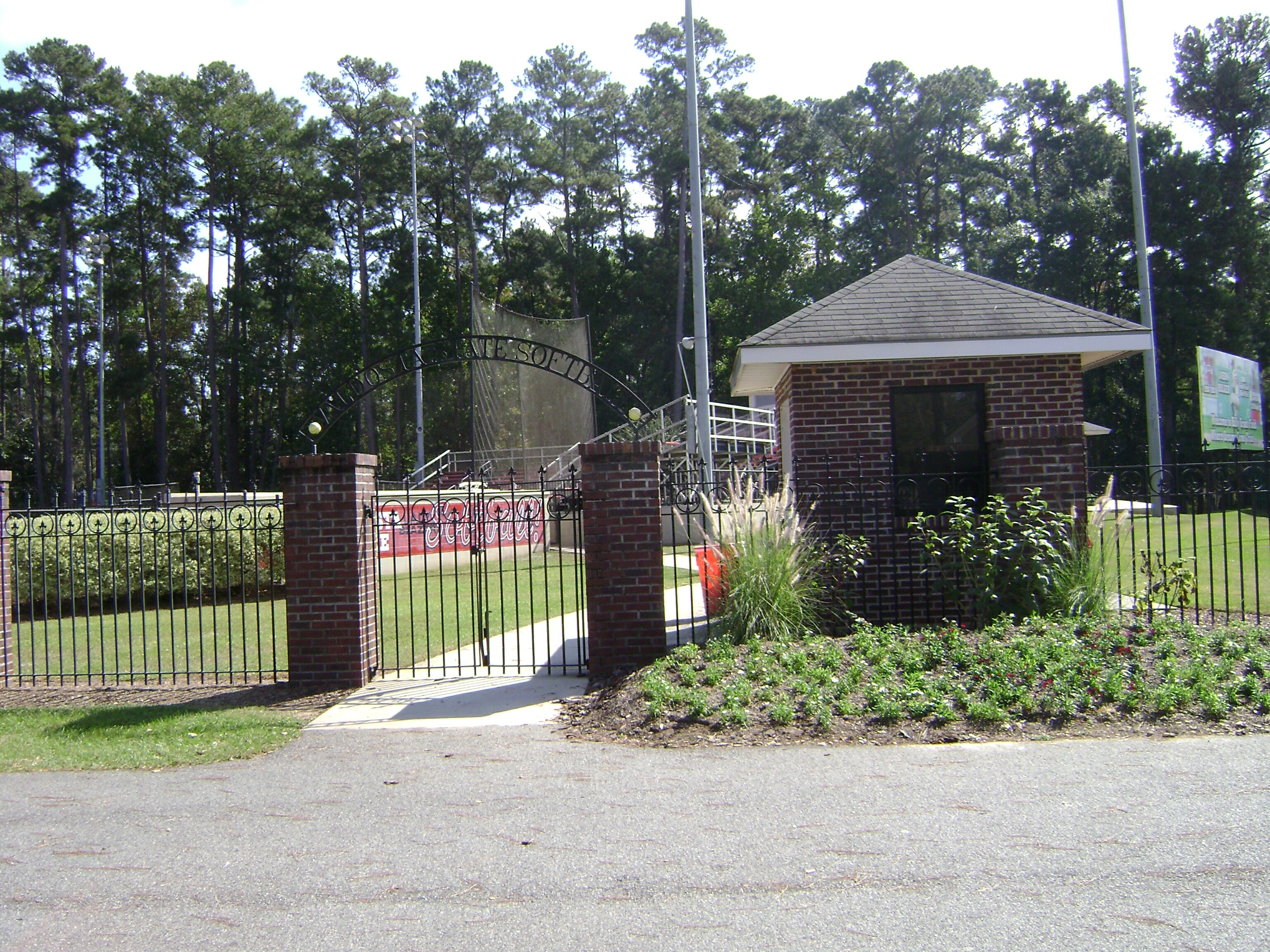
VSU Softball Complex

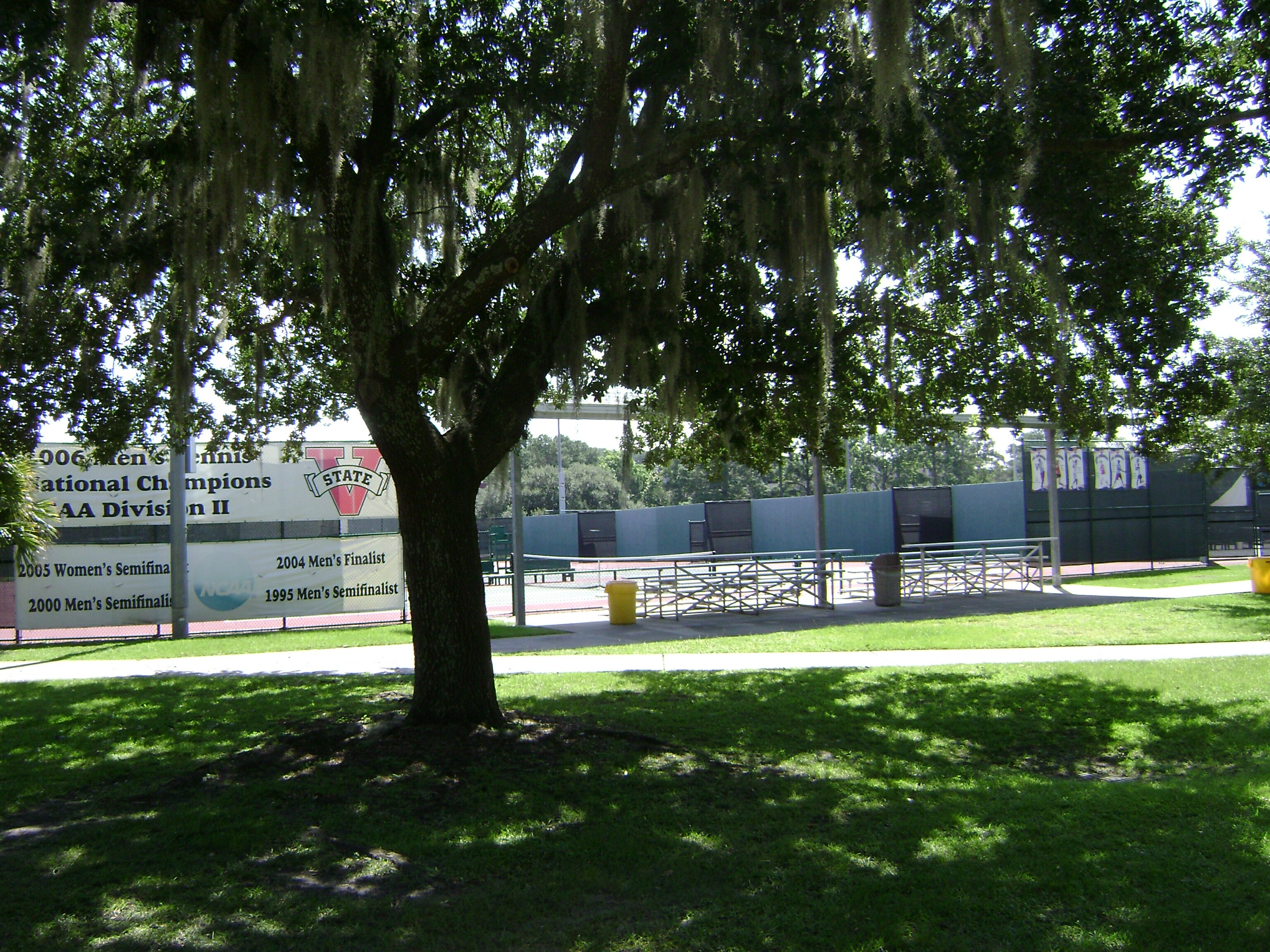
VSU Tennis Courts

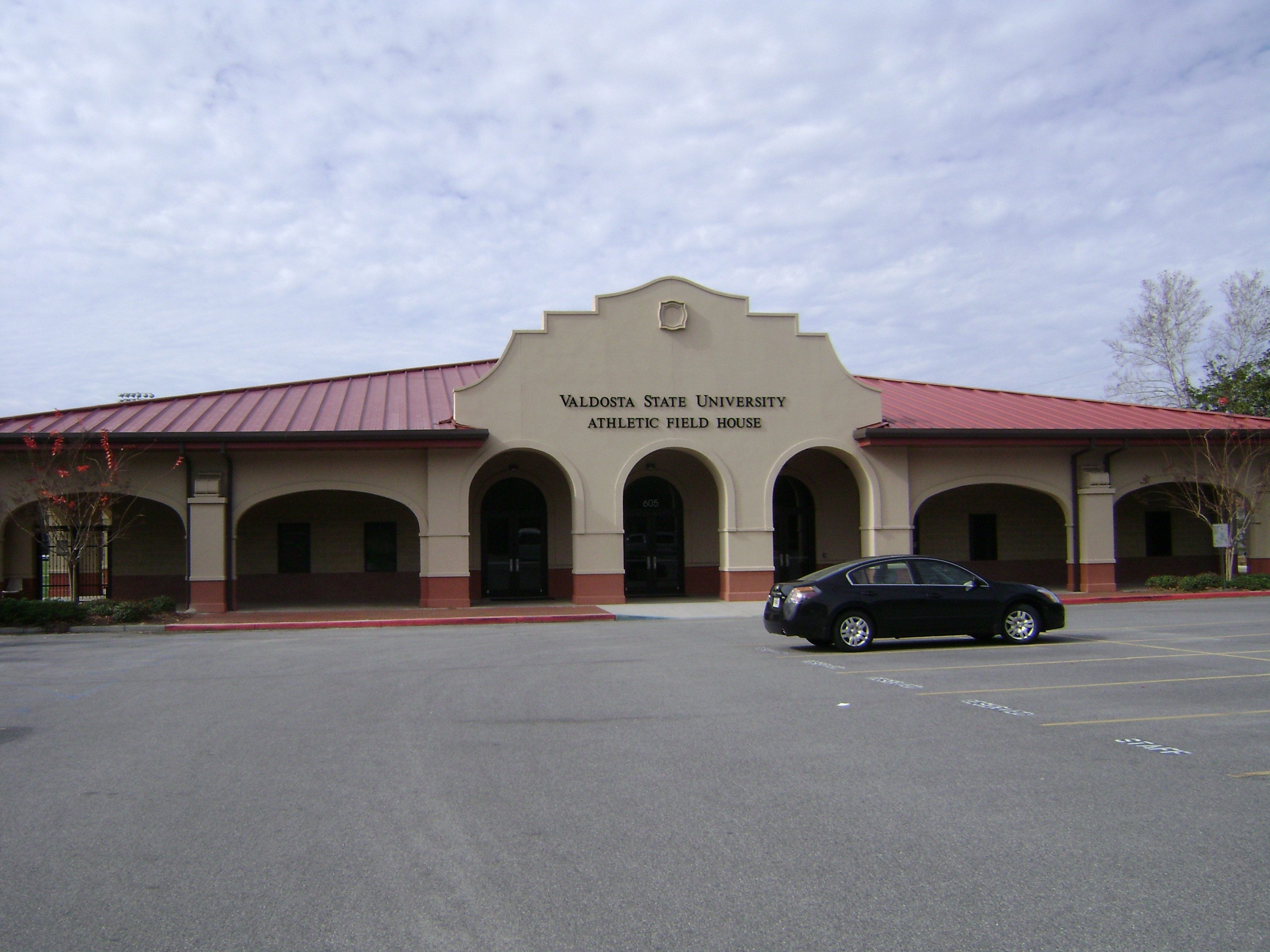
VSU Athletic Fieldhouse

Bazemore–Hyder Stadium

- The stadium is the home field of the VSU football program. The stadium is shared with Valdosta High School and has a capacity of 11,249. The playing field is a Sprinturf synthetic grass surface.

The PE Complex

- A 5,355-seat, 105,600 square feet (9,810 m^{2}), multi-purpose arena known as "The Complex" is the home of the Valdosta State University Blazers basketball and volleyball teams. The Complex also contains a four-lane jogging track and offices for the athletic department, kinesiology, and physical education departments.

Billy Grant Baseball Field

- The Blazer baseball team plays at Billy Grant Field located on the Valdosta State North Campus. Formerly Blazer Field, the field was renamed to honor late VSC baseball coach and athletic director Bill Grant before the 1989 season. The complex includes the baseball field house, which opened in the spring of 1997. The field house includes offices, training room, locker rooms, and an indoor batting and pitching building for baseball and softball. Stadium seating and a new press box were constructed in 2005.

Softball Complex

- The Softball field is located on the North Campus adjacent to Billy Grant Field and opened in the fall of 1999. A new $400,000 state-of-the-art Softball Field house was opened in 2007 and houses locker rooms. The fenceline sits at 200 feet (61 m) throughout the outfield, and the stands seat 500. The infield is made of Alabama crimson stone, and there is also a fully functional press box.

Tennis Complex

- The VSU men's and women's tennis team utilizes a large twelve court complex adjacent to the PE Complex. The courts were renovated during the 2000–01 season and again in 2008. In 2011, following the men's team winning their second national championship, an additional 4 courts were added to the south end of the complex.

Kinderlou Forest

- The home of Valdosta State golf and the Southeastern Collegiate, Kinderlou Forest is located just minutes away from the VSU campus. The golf course plays 7,781 yards long from the championship tees and features five sets of tees for professionals, men, women and juniors. Designed by professional golfer Davis Love III. Travel Leisure Golf Magazine as one of the 30 best new courses of 2004. Kinderlou Forest is the home to the South Georgia Classic, a Nationwide PGA Tour event each spring.

Athletic Fieldhouse

- The 41,000-square-foot (3,800 m^{2}) fieldhouse opened in January 2009 at a cost of $5.8 million. Features of the new facility include the 7,690-square-foot (714 m^{2}) Jessie Tuggle Weight Room, which encases nearly 10 times the space of its predecessor. The fieldhouse also contains a 2,437-square-foot (226.4 m^{2}) training room. The area includes offices for the Valdosta State Athletic Training staff and a private physician exam room as well as a hydrotherapy room for rehabilitation work. The remainder of the Valdosta State Athletic Fieldhouse includes 6,258 square feet (581.4 m^{2}) of office space as well as 2,200 square feet (200 m^{2}) of meeting rooms, each equipped with state-of-the-art video equipment, and a 1,500-square-foot (140 m^{2}) computer lab. Outside of the facility are two lighted football practice fields and a soccer stadium.

== Notable alumni ==
=== Baseball ===
- Darren Bush

=== Men's basketball ===
- Jeremiah Hill
- Billy McShepard
- Pete Smith

=== Men's football ===
- Joseph Demarius "Jody" Fortson Jr.
- Chris Hatcher
- Kenny Moore II
- Jessie Floyd Tuggle, III

=== Women's soccer ===
- Zahimara Fantauzzi
- Deysla Reyes
