= UMSL Tritons =

- University: University of Missouri–St. Louis
- NCAA: Division II
- Conference: Great Lakes Valley Conference
- Athletic director: Holly Sheilley
- Location: St. Louis, Missouri
- Varsity teams: 11
- Basketball arena: Mark Twain Building
- Baseball stadium: UMSL Baseball Field
- Nickname: Tritons
- Colors: Red and gold
- Mascot: Louie
- Website: umsltritons.com
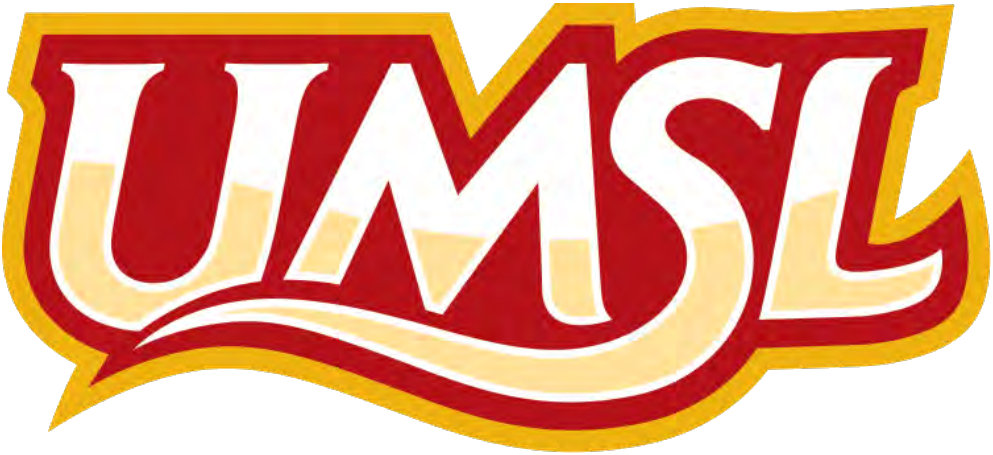

The University of Missouri–St. Louis (UMSL) Tritons are the athletic programs representing the University of Missouri–St. Louis, located in St. Louis, Missouri, in intercollegiate sports as a member of the Division II ranks of the National Collegiate Athletic Association (NCAA), primarily competing in the Great Lakes Valley Conference (GLVC) since the 1996–97 academic year; which they accepted an invitation back in 1995. The Tritons previously competed in the Mid-America Intercollegiate Athletics Association (MIAA) from 1980–81 to 1995–96.

Following a student contest in 1965, the athletic teams were commonly known as the Rivermen and Riverwomen, used until the Tritons name was adopted in May 2007.

== Conference affiliations ==
- 1966–67 to 1969–70 – NAIA Independent
- 1970–71 to 1979–80 – NCAA Division II Independent
- 1980–81 to 1995–96 – Mid-America Intercollegiate Athletics Association (Note: Formerly known as the Missouri Intercollegiate Athletic Association until 1992.)
- 1996–97 to Present – Great Lakes Valley Conference

== Varsity sports ==
UMSL competes in 17 intercollegiate varsity sports:

Men's sports	Women's sports
Baseball	Basketball
Basketball	Cross country
Cross country	Golf
Golf	Soccer
Soccer	Softball
Swimming	Swimming
Tennis	Tennis
Track and field	Track and field
	Volleyball

== Championships ==
=== NCAA Division II National Championships ===
Sport	Titles	Years won
Soccer (men's)	1	1973
Golf (men's)	6	1971, 1972, 1992, 1993, 2000, 2001

=== NAIA Tournament Appearances ===
Sport	App.	Years
Basketball (men's)	2	1968, 1969

== Facilities ==
=== Mark Twain Building ===
The Mark Twain Building is a 4,736-seat indoor arena that serves as the home facility to the UMSL men's and women's basketball teams and the UMSL volleyball team.

The arena was built in the fall of 1971 to serve as the host facility for UMSL's intercollegiate athletics and recreation and intramural activities.

In 1986, the arena underwent a face lift with the installation of new bleachers, including chair-back seats on the lower level. Other recent upgrades include improvements in the facilities lighting and sound system. In the summer of 2003, the university installed a new, four-sided scoreboard above the court. In fall of 2006, due to storm damage, the gym floor was completely replaced with all new support and wood surface. The new court was named Chuck Smith Court after UMSL's first athletic director and men's basketball coach.

In addition to Triton athletics the Mark Twain Building has hosted other events included the MHSAA boys and girls basketball tournament games, and in the summer of 2002 it served as the home gym for the St. Louis Skyhawks of the United States Basketball League.

Other accommodations in the Mark Twain Building include a jogging track on the lower level, a swimming pool, lockerroom facilities, weight lifting room, equipment room and a training room.

=== Don Dallas Soccer Field ===
Don Dallas Soccer Field is the soccer facility for the men's and women's soccer teams. The soccer field was recently renovated in the summer of 2002 with complete new Bermuda surface, allowing for a safer and more playable field for the student-athletes. In the summer of 2005, the press box was repainted and a new scoreboard was installed.

Originally built in 1970 as an intramural field and was upgraded in with portable bleachers to seat 500 people in 1975. In 1982, lights were added and in 1986 a press box, restrooms and permanent seating for 1,350 fans were built.

The facility is named after the former head soccer coach Don Dallas. Dallas built the UMSL soccer program from scratch and coached the team for 23 years. He led the team to 236 wins, 16 NCAA Tournament appearances and the school's only NCAA National Championship in 1973.

=== UMSL Baseball Field ===
UMSL Field is the newest facility, haven been completed in the fall of 2009. It is located on UMSL's South Campus and includes an elevated pressbox with covered bleacher seating behind home plate for 200 and room for lawn seating along either side with a modern sound system, a full-sized electronic scoreboard which sits in left field, dugouts and bullpens for each team, and an infield tarp to protect against inclement weather.
