= Eckerd Tritons =

Sports teams representing Eckerd College

- University: Eckerd College
- Conference: Sunshine State (primary)
- NCAA: Division II
- Athletic director: Tom Ryan
- Location: St. Petersburg, Florida
- Varsity teams: 16 (8 men's, 8 women's, 1 co-ed)
- Basketball arena: McArthur Center
- Baseball stadium: Turley Athletic Complex
- Softball stadium: Turley Athletic Complex
- Soccer stadium: Johnson Field
- Tennis venue: Fred Bullard Courts
- Mascot: Tritons
- Nickname: Tritons
- Colors
- Website: eckerdtritons.com

The Eckerd Tritons are composed of 16 teams representing Eckerd College in intercollegiate athletics, including men and women's basketball, golf, sailing, soccer, cross country, and tennis. Men's sports include baseball. Women's sports include softball, volleyball, and beach volleyball. The Tritons compete in the NCAA Division II and are members of the Sunshine State Conference.

== Teams ==
Eckerd College sponsors teams in 5 men's and eight women's NCAA sanctioned sports:

Men's sports	Women's sports
Baseball	Basketball
Basketball	Beach volleyball^{1}
Golf	Golf
Soccer	Sailing^{2}
Tennis	Soccer
	Softball
	Tennis
	Volleyball

Notes

- ^{1} Beach volleyball is a fully sanctioned NCAA sport which had its first national championship in the spring of 2016. Eckerd competes as an independent.
- ^{2} Sailing is sanctioned by the Intercollegiate Sailing Association, not by the NCAA.

=== Baseball ===
Eckerd has had 28 Major League Baseball draft selections since the draft began in 1965.

Year	Player	Round	Team
1975	Bill Evers	24	Expos
1976	Bill Evers	6	Cubs
1976	Bill Evers	5	Indians
1977	Stan Saleski	27	Yankees
1977	Joe Lefebvre	3	Yankees
1978	Randall Kwist	12	Yankees
1978	Peter Khoury	5	Yankees
1978	Steve Balboni	2	Yankees
1980	Gary Nutter	22	Tigers
1981	Gerry Melillo	17	Expos
1981	Pat Castiglia	13	Red Sox
1982	Gerry Melillo	13	Orioles
1983	Michael Lopez	8	Orioles
1984	David Crossley	7	Cardinals
1985	Scott Shaw	11	Yankees
1986	Mark Morawski	22	Orioles
1989	Ismael Cruz	21	Phillies
1990	Ron Watson	37	Angels
1990	Bill Norris	25	Red Sox
1991	Jim Mecir	3	Mariners
1995	Tom Russin	29	Orioles
2000	Tommy Muldoon	23	Tigers
2004	Billy Evers	35	Devil Rays
2005	Ryan Searage	18	Pirates
2010	Matt Abraham	49	Blue Jays
2010	Chris Clinton	23	Orioles
2012	Joe Cuda	27	Cardinals
2013	Audry Santana	38	White Sox
2016	Nick Hill	26	Giants
2019	Garrett Hiott	25	Rays
2019	Dillon McCollough	27	Orioles
2019	Mitch Calandra	30	Braves
2019	Nick Conti	39	Mets
