= New Haven Chargers baseball =

New Haven Chargers
- 2026 New Haven Chargers baseball team
- Founded: 1963
- Overall record: 1,552-626-8 (as of 2024)
- University: University of New Haven
- Head coach: Chris Celano (15th season)
- Conference: Northeast Conference
- Location: West Haven, Connecticut
- Home stadium: Frank Vieira Field
- Nickname: Chargers
- Colors: Blue and gold

College World Series runner-up
- Division II: 1980, 1989

College World Series appearances
- NAIA: 1966, 1970; Division II: 1974, 1977, 1978, 1979, 1980, 1982, 1984, 1985, 1986, 1987, 1988, 1989, 1990, 1995, 1998

NCAA tournament appearances
- Division II: 1972, 1973, 1974, 1976, 1977, 1978, 1979, 1980, 1981, 1982, 1983, 1984, 1985, 1986, 1987, 1988, 1989, 1990, 1993, 1994, 1995, 1996, 1998, 2001, 2003, 2006, 2010, 2013, 2017, 2018, 2024

Conference tournament champions
- ECC: 2004; NE-10: 2013, 2017, 2024

Conference regular season champions
- 1963, 1964, 1965, 1966, 1984, 1986, 1987, 1989, 1990, 1993, 1994, 1996, 1997; ECC: 2006, 2013

The New Haven Chargers baseball team is the varsity intercollegiate athletic team of the University of New Haven in West Haven, Connecticut, United States. The team competes in the National Collegiate Athletic Association's Division I and is a member of the Northeast Conference since July 1, 2025. They will become full members in the 2028-29 season after finishing the four-year NCAA Division I reclassification period.

== History ==
The team began play in the Southern New England Conference of the NAIA in 1962 with Frank "Porky" Vieira as head coach. It played there for its first five seasons. They departed the NAIA in 1971 for NCAA Division II. In 1980, they reached to the championship of the 1980 NCAA Division II baseball tournament, losing to Cal Poly Pomona 13-6. They joined the New England Collegiate Conference in 1983. The baseball field was dedicated in Vieira's honor in 1986. They reached the 1989 NCAA Division II baseball tournament championship round, losing 9–5 to Cal Poly San Luis Obispo in a game that was later forfeited due to violations. They joined the East Coast Conference in 2003, where they won two regular season championships and one tournament. In 2006, Vieira retired as coach after 44 seasons and a record of 1,127-324-6. They joined the Northeast-10 Conference in 2009.

Likely the most famous baseball player to come out of New Haven is Steve Bedrosian, who won the Cy Young Award in the National League in 1987 in a 14-year career.
