= Florida Southern Moccasins =

Athletics teams of Florida Southern College

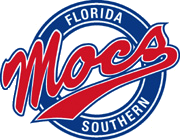
- University: Florida Southern College
- Nickname: Moccasins
- NCAA: Division II
- Conference: Sunshine State (primary)
- Athletic director: Drew Howard
- Location: Lakeland, Florida
- Varsity teams: 23 (10 men's, 12 women's, 1 co-ed)
- Basketball arena: George W. Jenkins Field House
- Baseball stadium: Henley Field
- Softball stadium: Chris Bellotto Field
- Soccer stadium: Berend Field
- Aquatics center: Nina B. Hollis Wellness Center Pool
- Lacrosse stadium: Berend Field
- Tennis venue: Wynee Warden Tennis Center
- Colors: Scarlet and white
- Mascot: Mocsie
- Website: fscmocs.com

Team NCAA championships
- 30

The Florida Southern Moccasins (Mocs) are the athletic teams that represent Florida Southern College, located in Lakeland, Florida, in NCAA Division II intercollegiate sports. The Moccasins compete as members of the Sunshine State Conference in 17 varsity sports. Florida Southern has been a member of the conference since its founding in 1975. Florida Southern also competes as independents in six other sports.

== Varsity teams ==
Men's sports	Women's sports
Baseball	Basketball
Basketball	Beach volleyball
Cross country	Cross country
Golf	Golf
Lacrosse	Lacrosse
Soccer	Soccer
Swimming	Softball
Tennis	Swimming
Track^{†}	Tennis
Water skiing	Track^{†}
Esports	Volleyball
	Equestrian
	Esports
	Water skiing
† – Track includes both indoor and outdoor

=== Men's basketball ===
The men's basketball program has experienced significant success since the inception of the SSC in 1975. The Mocs have won the SSC regular season 22 times and have also been crowned SSC Tournament Champions 22 times. FSC, which won consecutive regular and postseason titles from 2012–2014, leads the SSC in conference wins (310), and owns the best winning percentage of any current member (.711).

The men's basketball team made three straight trips to the Final Four from 1980 to 1982, finishing third in 1980, winning the 1981 national title with a 73–68 win over Mount St. Mary's, and finishing as national runner-up in 1982, falling to University of the District of Columbia, 73–63. The Mocs took the national title again in 2015 with a 77–62 win over Indiana University of Pennsylvania, and Kevin Capers was named tournament MVP and first team all-American.

=== Baseball ===
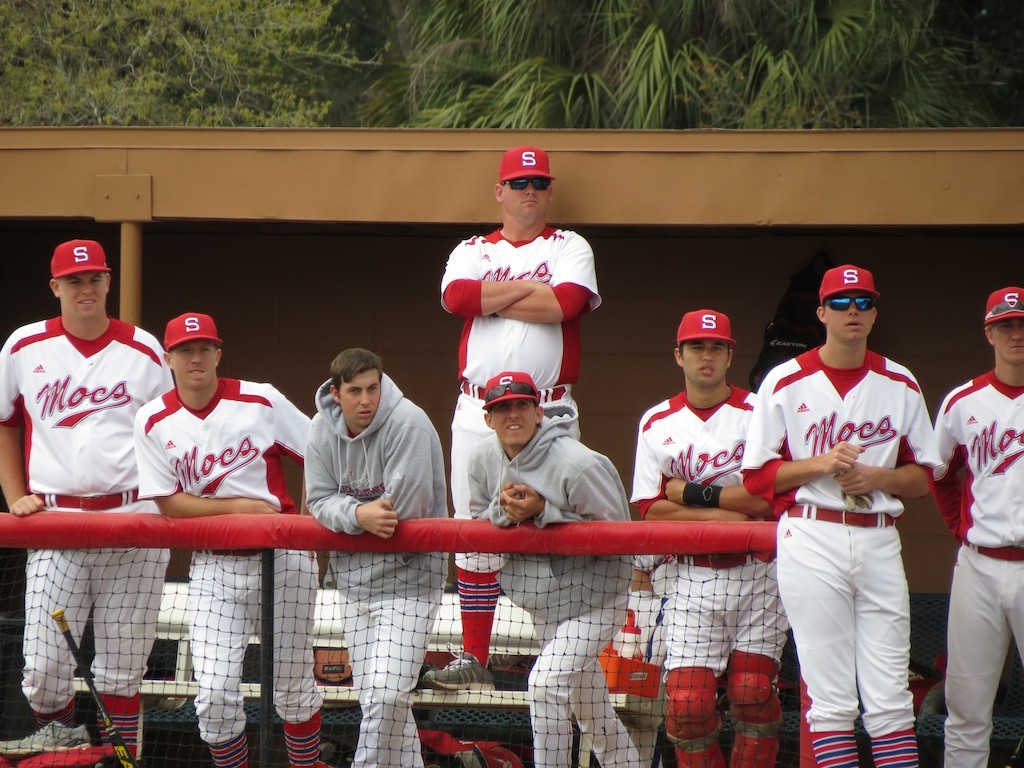
The 2013 baseball team during a game

The Mocs baseball program has won 17 SSC baseball championships and nine national championships (1971, 1972, 1975, 1978, 1981, 1985, 1988, 1995, and 2005). The team has also finished as national runner up four times (1979, 1982, 1984, 1994), and appeared in the single-division NCAA tournament in 1960 before the NCAA began holding separate tournaments for its divisions in 1968. In addition to NCAA play, the baseball team traditionally plays an exhibition game against the Detroit Tigers, who conduct their Spring Training in Lakeland. The team's current head coach is Rick O'Dette, who assumed the role in 2025. From 2013 to 2024, the head coach was former Florida Southern and MLB player Lance Niekro, son of MLB pitcher Joe Niekro and nephew of MLB pitcher Phil Niekro. The Moccasins have had 13 MLB draft picks and many free agent MLB signees under Coach Niekro.

=== Golf ===
==== Men ====
The men's golf program has won 14 NCAA National Championships (1981, 1982, 1985, 1986, 1990, 1991, 1995, 1996, 1998, 1999, 2000, 2010, 2017, 2026), finished as national runners-up 5 times (1979, 1980, 1984, 1988, 2001), and produced nine individual national champions: 1979 (Tom Gleeton), 1981 (Tom Patri), 1986 (Lee Janzen), 1999 (Matt Saglio), 2000 (Jeff Klauk), 2001 (Steve Sokol), 2013 (Tim Crouch), 2014 (Tim Crouch), 2018 (John VanDerLaan), and 2019 (Michael VanDerLaan). Among the more successful Moccasin alumni are PGA Tour members Rocco Mediate, Lee Janzen and Jeff Klauk.

==== Women ====
The women's golf team has won four national championships (2000, 2001, 2002, 2007). From 1998 to 2004, the team played in the finals each year, winning three consecutive championships (2000, 2001, 2002). In the seven seasons between 1996 and 2002, the program produced three two-time individual national champions (five consecutive): Shanna Nagy 1996 & 1998, Lisa Cave 1999 & 2000, and Jana Peterkova 2001 & 2002.

=== Men's swimming ===
The men's swimming program has also experienced success at the national level placing third in 2012 and 2016 and runner-up in 2013 and 2014.

=== Esports ===
In November 2017, Florida Southern announced their journey into collegiate Esports — the first varsity program of its kind in Florida. Senior, Nathan Carson was selected to serve as the head coach for the Mocs in their inaugural year. In January 2018, the Moccasins announced rosters for Hearthstone and League of Legends. In August 2018, the Mocs Esports team introduced two additional teams competing in Overwatch and Rocket League.

== Football ==
The Florida Southern Moccasins football team represented the college in the sport of American football from 1912 to 1935, with a break during the 1918 season. The team's overall record was 57–70–8. From 1926 to 1930 it was a member of the Southern Intercollegiate Athletic Association. In 1913, Florida Southern lost to Florida 144–0. In 1919, Southern upset the Gators 7–0.

== Championships ==
Florida Southern's athletic program is one of the most prolific in Division II sports with 32 national championships, including in men's golf (14), baseball (9), women's golf (4), men's basketball (2), softball (1), and women's lacrosse (2). Moccasin athletes have also captured 22 individual NCAA National Championships, including 8 in men's golf, 6 in women's golf, 5 in women's swimming, and 3 in men's swimming. Florida Southern's most recent championship came in 2016 when the women's lacrosse team won its first NCAA title. The college competes in 20 sports, 9 for men, 10 for women, and 1 co-ed sport.

Association	Division	Sport	Year	Opponent/Runner-up	Score/Points
NCAA (32)	Division II (32)	Baseball (9)	1971	Central Michigan	4–0
NCAA (32)	Division II (32)	Baseball (9)	1972	Cal State Northridge	5–1
NCAA (32)	Division II (32)	Baseball (9)	1975	Marietta	10–7
NCAA (32)	Division II (32)	Baseball (9)	1978	Delta State	7–2
NCAA (32)	Division II (32)	Baseball (9)	1981	Eastern Illinois	9–0
NCAA (32)	Division II (32)	Baseball (9)	1985	Cal Poly Pomona	15–5
NCAA (32)	Division II (32)	Baseball (9)	1988	Sacramento State	5–4
NCAA (32)	Division II (32)	Baseball (9)	1995	Georgia College	15–0
NCAA (32)	Division II (32)	Baseball (9)	2005	North Florida	12–9
NCAA (32)	Division II (32)	Men's basketball (2)	1981	Mount Saint Mary's	73–68
NCAA (32)	Division II (32)	Men's basketball (2)	2015	Indiana (PA)	77–62
NCAA (32)	Division II (32)	Men's golf (14)	1981	U.S. International	1,184–1,219
NCAA (32)	Division II (32)	Men's golf (14)	1982	Southwest Texas State	1,181–1,191
NCAA (32)	Division II (32)	Men's golf (14)	1985	Stephen F. Austin	1,192–1,202
NCAA (32)	Division II (32)	Men's golf (14)	1986	Columbus	1,196–1,207
NCAA (32)	Division II (32)	Men's golf (14)	1990	Columbus	1,170–1,196
NCAA (32)	Division II (32)	Men's golf (14)	1991	Columbus	1,166–1,190
NCAA (32)	Division II (32)	Men's golf (14)	1995	USC Aiken	1,204–1,214
NCAA (32)	Division II (32)	Men's golf (14)	1996	USC Aiken	1,178–1,187
NCAA (32)	Division II (32)	Men's golf (14)	1998	Columbus State	1,168–1,175
NCAA (32)	Division II (32)	Men's golf (14)	1999	USC Aiken	1,125–1,157
NCAA (32)	Division II (32)	Men's golf (14)	2000	Cal State Bakersfield; Grand Canyon	1,140–1,169
NCAA (32)	Division II (32)	Men's golf (14)	2010	Central Missouri	1,206–1,213
NCAA (32)	Division II (32)	Men's golf (14)	2017	Lynn	3–2
NCAA (32)	Division II (32)	Men's golf (14)	2026	Wingate	3–2
NCAA (32)	Division II (32)	Women's golf (4)	2000	Rollins	1,259–1,266
NCAA (32)	Division II (32)	Women's golf (4)	2001	Rollins	1,250–1,266
NCAA (32)	Division II (32)	Women's golf (4)	2002	Barry	1,234–1,308
NCAA (32)	Division II (32)	Women's golf (4)	2007	Rollins	1,188–1,198
NCAA (32)	Division II (32)	Women's lacrosse (2)	2016	Adelphi	8–7
NCAA (32)	Division II (32)	Women's lacrosse (2)	2026	Maryville	9–7
NCAA (32)	Division II (32)	Softball (1)	1993	Augustana (SD)	11–5

== Notable alumni ==
=== Baseball ===
- Brian Butterfield, baseball coach
- Ralph Citarella, baseball player
- Rob Dibble, baseball player
- Eddie Gaillard, baseball player
- John Hudek, baseball player
- James Hurst, baseball player
- Matt Joyce, baseball player
- Dusty Rhodes (baseball coach), baseball player
- Andy McGaffigan, baseball player
- Lance Niekro, baseball player
- Greg Pryor, baseball player
- Carlos Reyes, baseball player
- Gus Schlosser, baseball player
- Brett Tomko, baseball player

=== Men's basketball ===
- Goof Bowyer, basketball coach
- Jessie Burbage, basketball coach
- Linc Darner, basketball coach
- Jimmy R. Haygood, basketball coach
- Hal Wissel, basketball coach
- Kevin Capers, basketball player
- Dylan Travis, basketball player & Olympian

=== Women's basketball ===
- Emma Cannon, basketball player

=== Men's golf ===
- Lee Janzen, professional golfer
- Rocco Mediate, professional golfer

=== Men's soccer ===
- Clay Roberts, former soccer player, current coach
