= 2008 NCAA Division I baseball season =

Baseball season

- Duration: February 22–June 25, 2008
- Number of teams: 298
- Preseason No. 1: Arizona State

Tournament
- Duration: May 30–June 25, 2008
- Most conference bids: SEC (9)

College World Series
- Duration: June 14–June 25, 2008
- Champions: Fresno State (1st title)
- Runners-up: Georgia (6th CWS Appearance)
- Winning coach: Mike Batesole (1st title)
- MOP: Tommy Mendonca (Fresno State)

Seasons
- ← 2007 2009 →

The 2008 NCAA Division I baseball season play of college baseball in the United States, organized by the National Collegiate Athletic Association (NCAA) at the Division I level, began on February 22, 2008. The season was the first to have a uniform start date for both southern and northern teams. The change from previous seasons, in which weather allowed southern teams to begin play weeks before northern teams, was an attempt to improve parity between warm-weather and cold-weather teams. The season progressed through the regular season, many conference tournaments and championship series, and concluded with the 2008 NCAA Division I baseball tournament and 2008 College World Series. The College World Series, which consisted of the eight remaining teams in the NCAA tournament, was held in its annual location of Omaha, Nebraska, at Rosenblatt Stadium. It concluded on June 25, 2008, with the final game of the best of three championship series. Fresno State defeated Georgia two games to one to claim their first championship. Fresno State was the first team seeded fourth in its regional tournament to win a national championship since the NCAA tournament adopted the current 64-team format in 1999.

== Realignment ==
=== New programs ===
Five new programs joined Division I baseball for the 2008 season, four from the NCAA Division II. Florida Gulf Coast, previously a Division II independent; North Carolina Central, previously of the Division II Central Intercollegiate Athletic Association; Presbyterian, previously of the Division II South Atlantic Conference; and South Carolina Upstate, previously of the Division II Peach Belt Conference, all made the transition to Division I. The fifth new program, Houston Baptist, joined Division I from the NAIA.

=== Conference changes ===
Entering the 2008 baseball season, the Mid-Continent Conference was renamed The Summit League. The renamed conference was one of several conferences to make membership changes.

Both the renamed Summit League and the Atlantic Sun Conference added multiple members. The Summit added three schools, IPFW, North Dakota State, and South Dakota State, all previously Division I independents. The Atlantic Sun added two schools, Florida Gulf Coast and South Carolina Upstate, both from Division II.

Both the Big West Conference, which added UC Davis from the Division I independent ranks, and the Horizon League, which added Valparaiso from the Mid-Continent, added a single member.

Three schools joined the Division I independent ranks. Le Moyne left the Metro Atlantic Athletic Conference to become an independent, and both North Carolina Central and Presbyterian became independents after their transitions from Division II.

== Conference standings ==
America East Conference
	Conf			Overall		
Team	W	L	Pct	W	L	Pct
Binghamton	15	8	.652	29	27	.518
Stony Brook	14	10	.583	34	26	.567
UMBC	13	11	.542	21	29	.420
Vermont	12	11	.522	27	24	.529
Hartford	10	13	.435	18	31	.367
Albany	10	14	.417	17	37	.318
Maine	8	15	.394	18	28	.394

Atlantic 10 Conference
	Conf			Overall		
Team	W	L	Pct	W	L	Pct
Charlotte	19	8	.704	43	16	.729
Xavier	16	6	.727	24	29	.453
Duquesne	15	9	.625	27	29	.482
Temple	16	11	.593	25	28	.472
Rhode Island	15	11	.574	31	27	.534
St. Bonaventure	15	12	.556	29	23	.558
Fordham	13	13	.500	29	23	.558
Dayton	12	13	.480	27	23	.540
George Washington	11	16	.407	26	29	.473
Massachusetts	11	16	.407	18	27	.400
La Salle	11	16	.407	16	36	.308
Richmond	10	16	.389	20	31	.396
Saint Louis	9	17	.346	21	29	.420
Saint Joseph's	9	18	.333	18	32	.360

Atlantic Coast Conference
	Conf			Overall		
Team	W	L	Pct	W	L	Pct
Atlantic
Florida State	24	6	.800	54	14	.794
North Carolina State	18	11	.621	42	22	.656
Wake Forest	13	16	.448	25	31	.446
Clemson	11	18	.383	31	27	.534
Maryland	9	21	.300	30	26	.536
Boston College	9	21	.300	26	27	.491
Coastal
Miami (FL)	23	5	.821	53	11	.828
North Carolina	22	7	.759	54	14	.794
Georgia Tech	16	14	.533	41	21	.629
Virginia	15	15	.500	39	23	.629
Duke	10	18	.362	37	18	.670
Virginia Tech	6	24	.200	23	32	.418

Atlantic Sun Conference
	Conf			Overall		
Team	W	L	Pct	W	L	Pct
Florida Gulf Coast	25	8	.758	35	15	.700
Kennesaw State	21	12	.636	30	26	.536
Lipscomb	19	14	.576	33	30	.524
North Florida	18	15	.545	29	26	.527
South Carolina Upstate	17	16	.515	25	29	.463
Mercer	17	16	.515	24	23	.421
Belmont	16	17	.485	24	32	.429
Stetson	15	17	.469	26	33	.441
Gardner–Webb	15	18	.455	27	30	.474
Jacksonville	13	20	.394	27	29	.482
Campbell	12	20	.375	21	37	.362
East Tennessee State	9	24	.273	18	38	.321

Big East Conference
	Conf			Overall		
Team	W	L	Pct	W	L	Pct
St. John's	20	7	.741	42	16	.724
Cincinnati	19	8	.704	38	20	.655
Notre Dame	16	10	.615	32	21	.604
Louisville	16	11	.593	41	21	.661
Seton Hall	15	12	.556	31	25	.554
South Florida	14	13	.519	31	27	.534
West Virginia	13	14	.481	35	21	.625
Villanova	12	15	.444	30	28	.517
Connecticut	11	16	.407	27	28	.491
Rutgers	11	16	.407	23	29	.443
Pittsburgh	7	19	.269	19	34	.358
Georgetown	7	20	.259	17	30	.362

Big South Conference
	Conf			Overall		
Team	W	L	Pct	W	L	Pct
Coastal Carolina	17	3	.850	50	14	.781
Liberty	14	7	.667	35	26	.573
VMI	14	7	.667	29	26	.527
Winthrop	10	9	.526	25	33	.431
High Point	9	12	.429	20	33	.377
Radford	6	14	.300	24	32	.429
Charleston Southern	6	15	.286	17	35	.327
UNC Asheville	5	14	.263	23	34	.404

Big Ten Conference
	Conf			Overall		
Team	W	L	Pct	W	L	Pct
Michigan	26	5	.839	46	14	.767
Purdue	21	9	.700	32	25	.561
Penn State	17	15	.531	27	31	.466
Illinois	16	15	.516	29	25	.537
Ohio State	15	15	.500	30	26	.536
Indiana	14	17	.452	30	30	.500
Northwestern	14	18	.438	19	28	.404
Michigan State	12	18	.400	24	29	.453
Minnesota	10	21	.323	20	35	.364
Iowa	10	22	.312	21	33	.389

Big West Conference
	Conf			Overall		
Team	W	L	Pct	W	L	Pct
Long Beach State	16	8	.667	38	21	.644
Cal State Fullerton	16	8	.667	41	22	.651
UC Irvine	14	10	.583	42	18	.700
UC Santa Barbara	14	10	.583	35	21	.625
UC Riverside	14	10	.583	21	33	.389
UC Davis	13	11	.542	35	24	.593
Cal Poly	8	16	.333	24	32	.429
Cal State Northridge	8	16	.333	24	32	.429
Pacific	5	19	.208	14	41	.255

Big 12 Conference
	Conf			Overall		
Team	W	L	Pct	W	L	Pct
Texas A&M	19	8	.704	49	19	.708
Oklahoma State	18	9	.667	42	18	.700
Nebraska	17	9	.648	40	16	.711
Missouri	16	11	.593	37	21	.638
Texas	15	12	.556	39	22	.639
Baylor	11	16	.409	31	26	.544
Kansas State	11	16	.409	29	29	.500
Oklahoma	9	17	.352	35	25	.582
Kansas	9	18	.333	26	27	.491
Texas Tech	9	18	.333	25	30	.455

Colonial Athletic Association
	Conf			Overall		
Team	W	L	Pct	W	L	Pct
UNC Wilmington	25	4	.862	44	17	.721
James Madison	20	9	.690	39	19	.672
George Mason	18	10	.643	30	25	.545
William & Mary	16	13	.552	36	21	.632
Old Dominion	14	14	.500	25	27	.481
Towson	14	16	.467	30	28	.517
Georgia State	12	17	.414	33	23	.589
Northeastern	12	17	.414	25	26	.490
Delaware	11	17	.393	22	31	.415
Virginia Commonwealth	8	17	.320	15	30	.333
Hofstra	7	23	.233	19	36	.345

Conference USA
	Conf			Overall		
Team	W	L	Pct	W	L	Pct
Rice	21	3	.875	47	15	.758
Southern Miss	15	9	.625	42	22	.656
Tulane	13	9	.591	39	22	.639
Houston	14	10	.583	42	24	.636
East Carolina	13	11	.542	42	21	.667
Marshall	10	13	.435	30	30	.500
Central Florida	8	16	.333	31	27	.534
Alabama-Birmingham	7	17	.292	26	34	.433
Memphis	5	18	.217	17	38	.309

Horizon League
	Conf			Overall		
Team	W	L	Pct	W	L	Pct
Illinois-Chicago	17	6	.739	35	22	.614
Wright State	16	6	.727	30	23	.566
Youngstown State	13	12	.520	23	33	.411
Cleveland State	10	13	.435	22	31	.415
Wisconsin-Milwaukee	11	15	.423	25	36	.410
Valparaiso	8	13	.381	21	35	.375
Butler	7	17	.292	12	34	.261

Ivy League
	Conf				Overall	
Team	W	L	Pct	W	L	Pct
Lou Gehrig
Columbia	15	5	.750	22	30	.423
Princeton	11	9	.550	20	22	.476
Penn	6	13	.350	15	23	.395
Cornell	6	14	.300	12	27	.308
Red Rolfe
Dartmouth	15	5	.750	25	17	.595
Yale	9	10	.474	20	24	.455
Brown	9	11	.450	20	24	.455
Harvard	8	12	.400	10	30	.250

Metro Atlantic Athletic Conference
	Conf			Overall		
Team	W	L	Pct	W	L	Pct
Canisius	19	5	.792	41	13	.759
Manhattan	19	5	.792	31	20	.608
Siena	15	8	.652	30	26	.536
Rider	13	10	.565	29	28	.509
Fairfield	11	13	.458	14	36	.280
Niagara	10	14	.417	22	28	.440
Marist	8	15	.348	19	28	.404
Saint Peter's	7	16	.304	20	30	.400
Iona	4	20	.167	4	44	.083

Mid-American Conference
	Conf			Overall		
Team	W	L	Pct	W	L	Pct
East
Kent State	16	8	.667	36	21	.632
Bowling Green	16	8	.667	32	20	.615
Ohio	14	13	.519	29	30	.492
Akron	8	13	.381	25	24	.510
Miami (OH)	8	19	.296	18	36	.333
Buffalo	7	19	.269	14	38	.269
West
Eastern Michigan	15	8	.652	25	34	.424
Northern Illinois	16	10	.615	28	26	.519
Ball State	12	11	.522	28	25	.528
Western Michigan	12	12	.500	29	23	.558
Central Michigan	13	13	.500	29	27	.518
Toledo	10	13	.435	18	31	.367

Mid-Eastern Athletic Conference
	Conf			Overall		
Team	W	L	Pct	W	L	Pct
Bethune-Cookman	17	1	.945	36	22	.621
North Carolina A&T	11	6	.647	29	30	.492
Florida A&M	11	7	.611	20	22	.476
Delaware State	11	7	.611	16	33	.327
Norfolk State	7	10	.412	25	24	.510
Maryland-Eastern Shore	4	12	.250	6	50	.107
Coppin State	0	18	.000	4	52	.071

Missouri Valley Conference
	Conf			Overall		
Team	W	L	Pct	W	L	Pct
Wichita State	19	5	.792	48	17	.738
Missouri State	18	6	.750	40	17	.702
Creighton	16	8	.667	37	21	.638
Northern Iowa	14	10	.583	30	24	.556
Southern Illinois	12	12	.500	34	23	.596
Bradley	10	14	.417	26	28	.481
Indiana State	9	15	.375	18	32	.360
Illinois State	6	18	.250	22	30	.423
Evansville	4	20	.167	14	42	.250

Mountain West Conference
	Conf			Overall		
Team	W	L	Pct	W	L	Pct
Texas Christian	19	5	.792	44	19	.698
New Mexico	16	8	.667	34	25	.576
San Diego State	16	8	.667	31	28	.525
Utah	10	14	.417	26	28	.481
Brigham Young	10	14	.417	22	36	.379
Nevada-Las Vegas	9	15	.375	22	37	.373
Air Force	4	20	.167	18	33	.353

Northeast Conference
	Conf			Overall		
Team	W	L	Pct	W	L	Pct
Monmouth	20	5	.800	37	16	.698
Central Connecticut	18	9	.667	25	24	.510
Wagner	17	11	.607	27	28	.491
Mount St. Mary's	13	11	.542	21	34	.382
Fairleigh Dickinson	10	16	.385	15	38	.283
Sacred Heart	10	18	.357	12	41	.226
Quinnipiac	9	19	.321	16	36	.308
Long Island	7	15	.318	16	31	.340

Ohio Valley Conference
	Conf			Overall		
Team	W	L	Pct	W	L	Pct
Jacksonville State	23	4	.852	37	21	.638
Samford	19	7	.731	33	23	.589
Austin Peay	14	12	.538	27	29	.466
Eastern Illinois	13	13	.500	27	30	.474
Tennessee Tech	13	14	.481	35	23	.603
Southeast Missouri State	12	13	.480	26	26	.500
Murray State	12	14	.462	21	30	.412
Eastern Kentucky	12	15	.444	26	27	.491
Morehead State	8	19	.296	18	33	.353
Tennessee-Martin	5	20	.200	10	41	.196

Pacific-10 Conference
	Conf			Overall		
Team	W	L	Pct	W	L	Pct
Arizona State	16	8	.667	49	13	.790
Stanford	14	10	.583	41	42	.629
UCLA	13	11	.542	33	27	.550
Arizona	12	12	.500	42	19	.689
California	12	12	.500	33	21	.609
Washington	11	13	.458	32	21	.604
Oregon State	11	13	.458	28	24	.538
USC	11	13	.458	28	28	.500
Washington State	8	16	.333	30	26	.536

Patriot League
	Conf			Overall		
Team	W	L	Pct	W	L	Pct
Army	13	7	.650	25	25	.500
Navy	11	9	.550	32	25	.561
Holy Cross	11	9	.550	21	28	.429
Bucknell	10	10	.500	30	24	.556
Lafayette	8	12	.400	25	23	.521
Lehigh	7	13	.350	23	27	.460

Southeastern Conference
Team	W	L	Pct	W	L	Pct
East
Georgia	20	9	.683	45	25	.641
Florida	17	13	.567	34	24	.586
Kentucky	16	14	.533	44	19	.698
Vanderbilt	15	14	.517	41	22	.651
South Carolina	15	15	.500	40	23	.635
Tennessee	12	18	.400	27	29	.482
West
LSU	18	11	.617	49	19	.717
Alabama	16	14	.533	34	28	.548
Ole Miss	15	15	.500	39	26	.600
Arkansas	14	15	.483	34	24	.586
Auburn	11	19	.367	28	28	.500
Mississippi State	9	21	.300	23	33	.411

Southern Conference
	Conf			Overall		
Team	W	L	Pct	W	L	Pct
Elon	19	8	.704	44	18	.710
College of Charleston	18	9	.667	39	20	.661
Furman	17	10	.630	33	24	.579
Georgia Southern	16	11	.593	33	25	.569
UNC Greensboro	15	12	.556	33	27	.550
Appalachian State	14	13	.519	32	27	.542
Western Carolina	14	13	.519	29	28	.509
The Citadel	12	15	.444	28	28	.500
Wofford	6	21	.222	24	35	.407
Davidson	4	23	.148	12	38	.240

Southland Conference
	Conf			Overall		
Team	W	L	Pct	W	L	Pct
East
Lamar	20	10	.667	35	23	.603
Northwestern State	17	12	.586	28	28	.500
Southeastern Louisiana	15	15	.500	32	27	.542
Central Arkansas	13	16	.448	27	27	.500
McNeese State	7	23	.233	13	42	.236
Nicholls State	5	25	.167	10	44	.185
West
Texas-San Antonio	22	8	.733	39	19	.672
Texas State	19	11	.633	30	27	.526
Sam Houston State	18	12	.600	37	25	.597
Texas-Arlington	16	14	.533	26	31	.456
Texas A&M-Corpus Christi	14	15	.483	24	33	.421
Stephen F. Austin	12	17	.414	25	29	.463

Southwestern Athletic Conference
	Conf			Overall		
Team	W	L	Pct	W	L	Pct
East
Jackson State	18	5	.783	37	22	.627
Alcorn State	15	9	.625	29	16	.644
Mississippi Valley State	13	10	.565	18	26	.409
Alabama State	8	14	.364	13	22	.371
Alabama A&M	4	20	.167	7	39	.152
West
Southern	18	6	.750	28	18	.607
Grambling State	15	9	.625	21	28	.429
Prairie View A&M	14	10	.583	25	26	.490
Texas Southern	7	17	.292	16	34	.320
Arkansas-Pine Bluff	6	18	.250	10	33	.233

Summit League
	Conf			Overall		
Team	W	L	Pct	W	L	Pct
Oral Roberts	24	4	.857	48	14	.774
Southern Utah	16	11	.593	31	28	.525
Western Illinois	13	11	.542	21	33	.389
Centenary	13	15	.464	30	26	.536
South Dakota State	9	11	.450	22	27	.449
IPFW	10	17	.370	14	36	.280
Oakland	7	14	.333	15	30	.333
North Dakota State	7	16	.304	15	30	.333

Sun Belt Conference
	Conf			Overall		
Team	W	L	Pct	W	L	Pct
Louisiana-Monroe	20	10	.667	34	24	.586
New Orleans	18	11	.621	43	21	.672
Troy	18	12	.600	32	26	.552
Florida Atlantic	15	12	.556	32	27	.542
Western Kentucky	16	14	.533	33	27	.550
Louisiana-Lafayette	16	14	.533	30	29	.508
South Alabama	15	15	.500	32	26	.552
Middle Tennessee	13	16	.448	27	29	.482
Florida International	12	18	.400	20	36	.357
Arkansas-Little Rock	10	18	.357	16	32	.333
Arkansas State	8	21	.276	20	34	.370

Western Athletic Conference
	Conf			Overall		
Team	W	L	Pct	W	L	Pct
Fresno State	21	11	.656	47	31	.603
Nevada	18	14	.563	34	26	.567
Hawaii	18	14	.563	29	31	.483
San Jose State	17	14	.548	31	25	.554
New Mexico State	15	17	.469	28	33	.459
Sacramento State	14	17	.452	24	34	.414
Louisiana Tech	7	23	.233	23	31	.426

West Coast Conference
	Conf			Overall		
Team	W	L	Pct	W	L	Pct
San Diego	16	5	.762	44	17	.721
Pepperdine	14	6	.700	38	21	.644
Santa Clara	13	8	.619	33	22	.600
San Francisco	12	9	.571	31	26	.544
Gonzaga	10	10	.500	30	23	.566
Saint Mary's	8	13	.381	26	26	.500
Loyola Marymount	7	14	.333	23	32	.434
Portland	3	18	.143	21	33	.389

Division I Independents
Team	W	L	Pct
Dallas Baptist	34	19	.642
Le Moyne	32	21	.604
Houston Baptist	23	24	.489
Longwood	23	36	.470
Savannah State	17	23	.425
New York Tech	19	31	.385
Texas-Pan American	19	34	.358
Northern Colorado	16	33	.327
Utah Valley	14	32	.309
Presbyterian	13	40	.245
Hawaii–Hilo	5	22	.185
Chicago State	6	41	.128
New Jersey Tech	5	47	.096
North Carolina Central	0	22	.000

Team won the conference tournament and the automatic bid to the NCAA tournament
Conference does not have conference tournament, so team won the autobid for finishing in first
Team received at-large bid to NCAA tournament

== College World Series ==
The 2008 season marked the sixty second NCAA baseball tournament, which culminated with the eight team College World Series. The College World Series was held in Omaha, Nebraska. The eight teams played a double-elimination format, with Fresno State claiming their first championship with a two games to one series win over Georgia in the final.

=== Bracket ===
First round
1	Miami (FL)	4
8	Georgia	7
Stanford	16
4	Florida State	5
1	Miami (FL)	7
4	Florida State	5
2	North Carolina	8
7	LSU	4
Fresno State	17
6	Rice	5
7	LSU	6
6	Rice	5

Second round
8	Georgia	4
Stanford	3
1	Miami (FL)	3
Stanford	8
2	North Carolina	3
Fresno State	5
7	LSU	3
2	North Carolina	7

Semifinals
8	Georgia	10	—
Stanford	8	—
Fresno State	3	6
2	North Carolina	4	1

Finals
8	Georgia	7	10	1
Fresno State	6	19	6
