= Sonoma State Seawolves =

- University: Sonoma State University
- Nickname: Seawolves
- NCAA: Division II
- Conference: CCAA (primary)
- Athletic director: Nicole Annaloro
- Location: Rohnert Park, California
- Varsity teams: 11 (4 men's, 7 women's)
- Basketball arena: The Wolves' Den
- Baseball stadium: Seawolf Diamond
- Softball stadium: Seawolf Softball Field
- Soccer stadium: Seawolf Soccer Field
- Colors: Navy, Columbia blue, and white
- Mascot: Lobo the Seawolf
- Website: sonomaseawolves.com

Team NCAA championships
- 3

Individual and relay NCAA champions
- 1

The Sonoma State Seawolves are the dormant athletic teams that represent Sonoma State University, located in Rohnert Park, California, in NCAA Division II intercollegiate sports. The Seawolves competed as members of the California Collegiate Athletic Association for all 11 varsity sports. Due to budget issues and declining enrollment, Sonoma State eliminated its athletic department in 2025. In July 2026, Sonoma State announced it would reinstate its athletic program starting in the 2027–28 athletic season.

== History ==
Three NCAA national championships won by women's soccer in 1990, men's soccer in 2002, and men's golf in 2009 also highlight SSU's athletic achievements. In 2008, the athletics department created the Seawolf Sports Network, allowing home basketball games to be broadcast via streaming video over the internet in an effort to further increase interest in its sports programs.

From the school's opening in 1962 until 2002, the school's teams were known as the Cossacks, a nod to the Russian settlers at Fort Ross. The Cossacks name was deemed offensive because of the group's "fanatical intolerance of non-Christians. Cossack-led pogroms through the ages left hundreds of thousands of Jews and others dead." In November 2000, Sonoma State's academic senate voted 24–3 in favor of renaming the mascot, this time without any reference to a human group. The student senate subsequently passed a nearly identical resolution.

Then-school president Ruben Armiñana formed a "naming committee" composed of students, athletic department members, faculty and others. After many months of surveying thousands of students, staff, faculty and alumni, the group presented Arminana with two possible alternatives—Condors (for California's state bird, which does not live in Sonoma County) and Seawolves, a nod to Sonoma's own Jack London, author of The Sea-Wolf. Armiñana chose the latter.

In January 2025, it was announced that the athletics department would be eliminated due to budget cuts.

In July 2026, it was announced that Sonoma State will reinstate their athletic program starting in 2027–28 athletic season.

== Individual teams ==
Men's sports	Women's sports
Baseball	Basketball
Basketball	Cross country
Golf	Golf
Soccer	Soccer
Tennis	Softball
	Tennis
	Track and field^{†}
	Volleyball
	Water polo
† – Track and field includes both indoor and outdoor.

=== Baseball ===
Sonoma State's baseball team was particularly noteworthy with repeated conference championships. Former Major League Baseball player Steve Blateric managed the Seawolves from 1980–1985. Manager John Goelz had over 1,100 wins and was with the program since 1986. As of 2023, 48 players had been selected in the Major League Baseball draft, with five players advancing to the majors. Nick Nosti and Alex Crosby both represented their national team. Former player and current assistant coach Zack Pace also manages the Sonoma Stompers. Former assistant coach Tony Arnerich and player Tommy Everidge were both hitting coaches for the Seattle Mariners and Oakland Athletics, respectively.

- Sonoma State's All-time players in the MLB
- Marshall Brant, 1B — 1980 New York Yankees, 1983 Oakland Athletics
- Daniel Barone, P — 2007 Florida Marlins
- Tommy Everidge, 1B — 2009 Oakland Athletics
- O'Koyea Dickson, OF — 2017 Los Angeles Dodgers
- Scott Alexander, P — 2015–2017 Kansas City Royals, 2018–2021 Los Angeles Dodgers, 2022–2023 San Francisco Giants, 2024 Oakland Athletics

=== Men's soccer ===
The men's soccer team appeared in the 1991 NCAA Division II Men's Soccer Championship, but lost to Florida Tech. They would later win the championship against Southern New Hampshire University in 2002.

=== Softball ===
Coach Jennifer Bridges led the softball team to four straight NCAA tournament appearances and a pair of CCAA tournament championships.

=== Women's volleyball ===
Sonoma State's volleyball team had come very far to become 16th in the nation for Division II schools. Head coach, Bear Grassl, had received Coach of the Year.

== Championships ==
=== Appearances ===
The Sonoma State Seawolves competed in the NCAA Tournament across 13 sports (5 men's and 8 women's) 105 times at the Division II level.

- Baseball (13): 1991, 1992, 1998, 1999, 2001, 2003, 2004, 2007, 2008, 2009, 2011, 2013, 2014
- Men's basketball (7): 1973, 1974, 1989, 1999, 2003, 2006, 2017
- Women's basketball (6): 1998, 1999, 2002, 2004, 2007, 2008
- Women's cross country (1): 2001
- Men's golf (6): 2007, 2008, 2009, 2010, 2011, 2015
- Women's golf (2): 2010, 2015
- Men's soccer (10): 1990, 1991, 1993, 2002, 2005, 2007, 2008, 2009, 2010, 2016
- Women's soccer (14): 1990, 1991, 1992, 1993, 1994, 1995, 1997, 1998, 2000, 2012, 2013, 2015, 2016, 2017
- Softball (11): 1995, 2007, 2009, 2010, 2011, 2012, 2013, 2014, 2015, 2016, 2017
- Men's tennis (6): 2000, 2001, 2006, 2007, 2008, 2010
- Women's tennis (11): 1997, 1998, 1999, 2000, 2001, 2002, 2003, 2004, 2005, 2006, 2007
- Women's outdoor track and field (8): 1984, 1989, 1990, 1996, 1998, 1999, 2000, 2001
- Women's volleyball (10): 1993, 2008, 2009, 2010, 2011, 2012, 2013, 2014, 2015, 2017

=== Team ===
The Seawolves of Sonoma State earned 3 NCAA team championships at the Division II level.

- Men's (2)
  - Golf: 2009
  - Soccer: 2002
- Women's (1)
  - Soccer: 1990

Results

School year	Sport	Opponent	Score
1990–91	Women's soccer	Keene State	2–0
2002–03	Men's soccer	Southern New Hampshire	4–3
2008–09	Men's golf	CSU San Bernardino	1,179–1,179

=== Individual ===
At the Division III level, Sonoma State garnered 1 individual championship.

== Club sports ==
Sonoma State also has a club sports program led by lacrosse, 2002 MCLA National champions, rowing, and women's volleyball, the 2018 and 2019 Division II National Champions. In 2008, the Men's Volleyball Club finished as runner-up at the National Championships. In 2010, the Men's Volleyball Club won the division II NIRSA National Championship, and senior setter Scott Fontana was named MVP.

In 2017, Sonoma State Rowing saw success during the Western Intercollegiate Rowing Association. Both the Men's Varsity 8+ and Novice 4+ won gold, competing in the lightweight category.

In 2018, Sonoma State Women's Club Volleyball won the Division II National Championship. Outside hitter Rachel Hadley was named MVP. Right side hitter Bailey Oliver and Libero Becca Steiner were named 1st-team All-Americans, and Setter Samantha Wallace was named All-American Honorable Mention.

In 2019, Sonoma State Women's Club Volleyball won the Division II National Championship, their second title in two years. Outside hitter Rachel Hadley was named MVP for a second year in a row. Right side hitter Bailey Oliver and setter Sam Wallace were named 1st-team All-Americans, and middle blocker Molly Armstrong was named All-American Honorable Mention. Coaches Robert Stamps and Chelsea Reilley were named National Coaches of the Year.
