= John Schaly =

American baseball coach

Current position
- Title: Head coach
- Team: Ashland University
- Conference: G-MAC
- Record: 951–503–4 (.654)

Playing career
- 1979–1982: Marietta College
- Position: 2B

Coaching career (HC unless noted)
- 1982–1984: Iowa State (assistant)
- 1984–1985: Marietta College (assistant)
- 1985–1987: Kentucky (assistant)
- 1988–1991: Berry College
- 1992–1997: St. Leo University
- 1998–present: Ashland University

Head coaching record
- Overall: 1,314–721–7 (.645)

Accomplishments and honors

Championships
- 5× NCAA Division II College World Series appearances (1999, 2002, 2006, 2008, 2019); 5× GLIAC conference championships

Awards
- G-MAC Coach of the Year (2024); 7× GLIAC Coach of the Year (1999, 2002, 2004, 2007, 2009, 2015, 2019); SSC Coach of the Year (1996); ABCA Hall of Fame (2018); 5× ABCA Regional Coach of the Year (1999, 2002, 2006, 2008, 2019); NCBWA Regional Coach of the Year (2019); NCAA Division III World Series Champion (1981); NCAA Division III World Series MVP (1981); 2× NCAA Division III All-America (1981–1982)

John Schaly is an American college baseball coach who is currently the head coach of the NCAA Division II Ashland Eagles. He has held the position since the fall of 1997. As of 2026, he has the most wins among active Division II baseball coaches. In 2015 he joined his father, Don Schaly, in the elite "1,000 Career Coaching Wins" club, making them the first father/son 4-year college coaching duo to do so.

He has been inducted into several Halls of Fame: American Baseball Coaches Association (2018)., Marietta College Sports (1995), Ashland County Sports (2016), and the Mid-Ohio Valley Sports (2021).

Having served as president of the American Baseball Coaches Association (ABCA), Schaly remains active with the group serving on its board of directors. In the fall of 2024 the International Sports Group Baseball Softball (ISG) tapped Schaly's coaching skills to provide clinic sessions to coaches at all levels of the Polish Baseball/Softball Organization in Kutno, Poland. Schaly is also a founding member of "Coaches Fore Coaches", an organization dedicated to supporting young and upcoming baseball coaches.

== Playing career ==
A second baseman, Schaly played collegiate baseball under his father Don Schaly at Marietta College. He was a member of the Marietta squad that won the 1981 Division III College World Series where he was named the Most Valuable Player. Schaly was a two-time All-American and was inducted into the Marietta College Athletic Hall of Fame in 1995.

== Coaching career ==
=== Assistant Coaching 1982–1987 ===
Following graduation, Schaly was an assistant baseball coach from 1982 to 1984 at Iowa State University under Larry Corrigan where he roomed with Hall of Fame coach Leroy "Cap" Timm. He was also a member of his father's staff at Marietta for the 1984–1985 season before serving as an assistant at the University of Kentucky from 1985 to 1987 under Hall of Fame coach Keith Madison.

=== Berry College ===
In 1988, Schaly earned his first head coaching job at Berry College, reinstating a program that had been dormant since 1976. In four years, he held a record of 155–91–3. Three times, he led Berry to the NAIA playoffs, including one district title.

=== St. Leo University ===
In 1992, Schaly was named head coach at St. Leo University. He won 40 or more games twice and even had the Monarchs ranked first in the country during his six-year stint. In 1996, the team advanced to the NCAA Division II playoffs, the first time in an 18-year gap that earned Schaly Sunshine State Conference coach of the year. Schaly held a 208–127 record at St. Leo.

=== Ashland University ===
Schaly was named head coach at Ashland University in 1998. During his career, he has been recognized as the NCAA Division II region Coach of the Year five times. He's also coached more than 50 players who have continued to play professional baseball.

In 1998, the Eagles were 27–23. The next year (1999), they went 45–16 and advanced to the NCAA World Series. In 2002, the team also advanced to the NCAA Championship and became the first Ashland University team to win a game at the World Series.

In 2009, the Eagles were 42–15–1 and won the GLIAC regular season title with a 26–5–1 record. The Eagles were ranked third in the country, the highest ranking in the program's history. Schaly was recognized as the conference coach of the year.

In 2011, Schaly recorded his 900th career victory.

In 2013, the Eagles won their first GLIAC tournament championship.

In 2015, the Eagles won the GLIAC regular season title and the conference's first-ever South Division championship. Earlier in the season, Schaly would win his 1,000 career game, making himself and his father Don the first father-son tandem at four-year institutions to reach the mark. The Eagles would win their second consecutive GLIAC South Division title in 2016, as well as a share of the GLIAC regular-season championship.

In 2019, Ashland went 48–15 which won them the GLIAC regular season and tournament championships, as well as the Midwest Regional tournament title. The 48 wins tied the program record.

The Eagles have played in the NCAA postseason 18 times under Schaly. They have won five regional championships and reached the NCAA Division II College World Series five times.

== Head coaching records ==
Below is a table of Schaly's yearly records as an NCAA head baseball coach.

Record table
Season	Team	Overall	Conference	Standing	Postseason
Berry College (NAIA) (1988–1991)
1988	Berry College	35–24–1			
1989	Berry College	36–23			
1990	Berry College	46–27–1			
1991	Berry College	38–17–1			
Berry College:		155–91–3			
St. Leo University (SSC (Division II)) (1992–1997)
1992	St. Leo University	27–28	9–15	6th	
1993	St. Leo University	25–30	6–18	7th	
1994	St. Leo University	34–22	7–14	6th	
1995	St. Leo University	41–15	11–10	5th	
1996	St. Leo University	42–15	13–8	2nd	
1997	St. Leo University	39–17	10–11	5th	
St. Leo University:		208–127	56–76		
Ashland University (GLIAC (Division II)) (1998–2023)
1998	Ashland University	27–23–2	18–8–1	2nd	
1999	Ashland University	45–16	25–9	1st	NCAA Division II Tournament
2000	Ashland University	41–18	24–7	3rd	GLIAC Conference Champions
2001	Ashland University	38–18	19–10	3rd	
2002	Ashland University	48–13	24–7	1st	NCAA Division II Tournament
2003	Ashland University	37–20–1	22–8–1	2nd	GLIAC Conference Champions
2004	Ashland University	47–15	23–5	1st	
2005	Ashland University	32–16	13–7	3rd	
2006	Ashland University	47–17	22–5	T-2nd	NCAA Division II Tournament
2007	Ashland University	38–19	23–9	2nd	
2008	Ashland University	40–18	17–7	4th	NCAA Division II Tournament
2009	Ashland University	42–15–1	26–5–1	3rd	
2010	Ashland University	35–22	21–12	3rd	
2011	Ashland University	30–21	19–15	3rd	
2012	Ashland University	27–25	19–17	6th	
2013	Ashland University	37–19	20–12	3rd	GLIAC Conference Champions
2014	Ashland University	24–21	14–14	5th	
2015	Ashland University	38–19	22–10	1st	GLIAC Conference Champions
2016	Ashland University	33–22	22–8	T-1st	GLIAC Conference Champions
2017	Ashland University	20–29	12–20	9th	
2018	Ashland University	33–22	16–12	3rd	
2019	Ashland University	48–15	17–7	1st	GLIAC Conference Champions, NCAA Division II Tournament
2020	Ashland University	10–4	0–0		
2021	Ashland University	24–19	17–11	4th	
Ashland University (G-MAC (Division II)) (2022–present)
2022	Ashland University	35–21	22–10	2nd	
2023	Ashland University	33–21	22–10	2nd (North)	
2024	Ashland University	42–15	24–8	1st	G-MAC Regular Season Championship
Ashland University:		951–503–4	506–253–3		
Total:		1,314–721–7			
National champion Postseason invitational champion Conference regular season champion Conference regular season and conference tournament champion Division regular season champion Division regular season and conference tournament champion Conference tournament champion

== See also ==
- List of college baseball career coaching wins leaders
