= Holowaty =

Holowaty (may be spelled as Holovaty, Holovatyi) is a Ukrainian surname. Notable people with the surname include:

- Adrian Holovaty, American web developer.
- Bill Holowaty, American baseball coach.
- Daniel Holowaty (born 1989), American soccer player.
- Paul Holowaty (born 1985), English actor
- Serhiy Holovatyi, Ukrainian politician.

== See also ==
- Holovatsky
