= John Goelz =

American baseball coach

Biographical details
- Education: San Francisco State

Playing career
- Position: Pitcher

Coaching career (HC unless noted)
- 1977–1982: San Francisco State (assistant)
- 1984–1985: Albany (HS)
- 1986–2024: Sonoma State

Head coaching record
- Overall: 1,175–836–5 (.584)

Accomplishments and honors

Championships
- 5× CCAA Regular Season Championships (2001, 2003, 2007, 2008, 2014); 5× CCAA Tournament Championships (1999, 2001, 2003, 2007, 2008); 4× NCAC Championships (1990, 1991, 1992, 1998); 2× NCAA Division II College World Series appearances (2008, 2011); 2× NCAA Division II West Region Champions (2008, 2011)

Awards
- 3× CCAA Coach of the Year (2001, 2007, 2008); 4× NCAC Coach of the Year (1990, 1991, 1992, 1998); 3× ABCA NCAA Division II West Region Coach of the Year (2008, 2011, 2012); 2× NCBWA NCAA Division II West Region Coach of the Year (2007, 2008)

John Goelz is an American former college baseball coach. He was most recently the head baseball coach at the Sonoma State. Goelz compiled an overall win-loss record of 1,175–836–5, as of the end of the 2024 season. Prior to his coaching career, Goelz played college baseball at San Francisco State. He was a pitcher for the Gators in the mid-1970s. He was named Northern California Athletic Conference Coach of the Year four times and was California Collegiate Athletic Association Coach of the Year in 2001, 2007 and 2008. Goelz has been recognized nationally by receiving awards from American Baseball Coaches Association and National Collegiate Baseball Writers Association by being named NCAA Division II West Region Coach of the Year a total of five times.

He began coaching as an assistant at his alma mater, San Francisco State from 1977 to 1982. He then became the varsity coach at Albany (HS). In 1986, he became the head coach at Sonoma State, replacing Steve Blateric. He recorded his first career victory on February 11, 1986, against The Master's College. On April 29, 1989, he recorded his 100th victory against UC Davis. On May 4, 2001, Goelz recorded his 500th career victory against UC San Diego. In 2008, Sonoma State had a 29–1 start to the season, the Seawolves set a school record with 52 wins on their way to their first trip to the NCAA Division II Championship Tournament. In 2011, four Seawolves were selected in the first eleven rounds and they led all Division II teams with four draftees. As of 2013, Goelz had a 55–53 career record against Division I opponents. On April 25, 2015, Goelz earned his 1,000th career victory. Goelz has managed former Major League Baseball players Daniel Barone, Tommy Everidge, O'Koyea Dickson and Scott Alexander. Seattle Mariners hitting coach Tony Arnerich also worked under Goelz as an assistant coach in 2006. As of 2023, 41 players have been selected in the Major League Baseball draft under Goelz.

After 39 years, Goelz's contract was not renewed after the completion of the 2024 season.

== Head coaching record ==
Below is a table of Goelz's yearly records as an NCAA Division II head baseball coach.

Record table
Season	Team	Overall	Conference	Standing	Postseason
Sonoma State Seawolves (NCAC (Division II)) (1986–1998)
1986	Sonoma State	18–32	9–21	6th	
1987	Sonoma State	30–20	18–12	2nd	
1988	Sonoma State	28–21	15–13	3rd	
1989	Sonoma State	28–18	20–9	2nd	
1990	Sonoma State	35–17	21–9	1st	NCAC Champions
1991	Sonoma State	29–14–1	21–7	1st	NCAC Champions, NCAA Regionals
1992	Sonoma State	32–17–1	23–7	1st	NCAC Champions, NCAA Regionals
1993	Sonoma State	33–21	21–14	2nd	
1994	Sonoma State	23–25	14–21	4th	
1995	Sonoma State	25–28	17–18	4th	
1996	Sonoma State	30–26–1	16–19	t-3rd	
1997	Sonoma State	37–20	25–10	2nd	
1998	Sonoma State	33–21	23–12	1st	NCAC Champions, NCAA Regionals
Sonoma State Seawolves (CCAA (Division II)) (1999–2024)
1999	Sonoma State	40–26	21–15	1st	CCAA Tournament Champions, NCAA Regionals
2000	Sonoma State	39–23	25–15	3rd	CCAA Tournament
2001	Sonoma State	50–17	29–7	1st	CCAA Tournament Champions, NCAA Regionals
2002	Sonoma State	41–24	20–20	6th	
2003	Sonoma State	46–15–1	27–11	1st	CCAA Tournament Champions, NCAA Regionals
2004	Sonoma State	39–28	25–15	2nd	CCAA Tournament, NCAA Regionals
2005	Sonoma State	25–30	19–19	5th	
2006	Sonoma State	28–23–1	17–15	5th	
2007	Sonoma State	50–12	29–7	1st	CCAA Tournament Champions, NCAA Regionals
2008	Sonoma State	52–15	26–8	1st	CCAA Tournament Champions, NCAA West Region Champions, Division II College World Series appearance
2009	Sonoma State	35–16	22–10	2nd	CCAA Tournament, NCAA Regionals
2010	Sonoma State	24–28	17–23	7th	
2011	Sonoma State	37–22	24–16	2nd	CWS Second Round
2012	Sonoma State	28–25	23–17	4th	
2013	Sonoma State	36–22	24–16	4th	NCAA Regionals
2014	Sonoma State	27–18	24–8	1st	NCAA First Round
2015	Sonoma State	23–27	17–23	t-7th	
2016	Sonoma State	21–27	19–18	4th-North	
2017	Sonoma State	24–21	19–19	4th-North	
2018	Sonoma State	26–24	22–22	7th	
2019	Sonoma State	25–25	22–22	7th	
2020	Sonoma State	7–14	6–10	9th	Remainder of season canceled due to the COVID-19 pandemic
2021	Sonoma State				Season canceled due to the COVID-19 pandemic
2022	Sonoma State	24–26	21–19	t-4th	
2023	Sonoma State	22–22	16–20	8th	
2024	Sonoma State	25–26	19–21	6th	
Sonoma State:		1,175–836–5 (.584)	776–568 (.577)		
Total:		1,175–836–5 (.584)			
National champion Postseason invitational champion Conference regular season champion Conference regular season and conference tournament champion Division regular season champion Division regular season and conference tournament champion Conference tournament champion

== See also ==
- List of college baseball career coaching wins leaders
