= Tom Goodwin =

American baseball player & coach (born 1968)

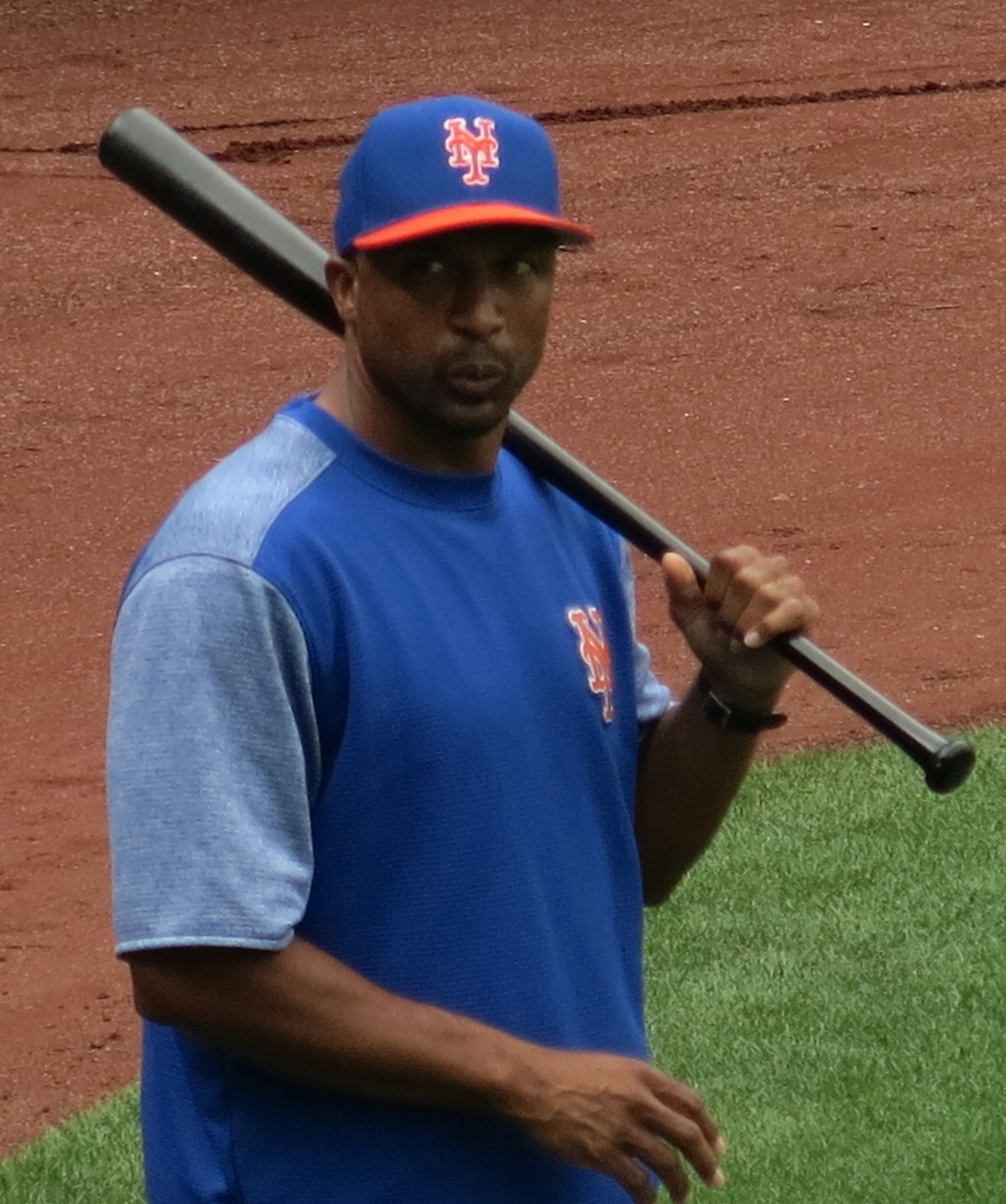
- Goodwin with the Mets in 2017

Fresno State Bulldogs
- Center fielder / Director of Player Development
- Born: July 27, 1968 (age 58); Fresno, California, U.S.
- Batted: Left Threw: Right

MLB debut
- September 1, 1991, for the Los Angeles Dodgers

Last MLB appearance
- September 30, 2004, for the Chicago Cubs

MLB statistics
- Batting average: .268
- Home runs: 24
- Runs batted in: 284
- Stolen bases: 369
- Stats at Baseball Reference

Teams
- As player: Los Angeles Dodgers (1991–1993); Kansas City Royals (1994–1997); Texas Rangers (1997–1999); Colorado Rockies (2000); Los Angeles Dodgers (2000–2001); San Francisco Giants (2002); Chicago Cubs (2003–2004); As coach: New York Mets (2012–2017); Boston Red Sox (2018–2021); Atlanta Braves (2024–2025)

Career highlights and awards
- World Series champion (2018)
Medals
Baseball
Representing United States
Olympic Games
Gold medal – first place	1988 Seoul	Team
Baseball World Cup
Silver medal – second place	1988 Rome	Team

Thomas Jones Goodwin (born July 27, 1968) is an American baseball coach and former center fielder who is the director of player development for California State University, Fresno (Fresno State) of the Pac-12 Conference (Pac-12). He played professionally for 14 seasons from 1991 to 2004 and then coached for the New York Mets, Boston Red Sox and Atlanta Braves. As a player, he was listed at 6 feet 1 inch (1.85 m) and 165 pounds (75 kg); he batted left-handed and threw right-handed.

== Playing career ==
Goodwin attended Central High School in Fresno, California, and then went on to play for Fresno State University. He was a two-time All-American selection at Fresno State, and was also named to The Sporting News college All-America team in 1989.

The Pittsburgh Pirates drafted Goodwin in the sixth round (134th overall) of the 1986 MLB draft, but he did not sign. In 1988, he was a member of the gold-medal-winning United States national baseball team at the Summer Olympics in Seoul. Goodwin opted to wait until 1989 to sign with a team, agreeing to terms with the Los Angeles Dodgers, after being selected in the first round (22nd overall) of the 1989 MLB draft.

Goodwin spent only three seasons in Minor League Baseball before making his MLB debut—he had at least 48 stolen bases in each of those seasons. In 1989, he was a member of Baseball America Class A Short Season all-star team, and was a member of the Pioneer League all-star team. In 1990, he was a member of the Texas League all-star team. He made his major-league debut on September 1, 1991, at the age of 23.

Goodwin's major-league career highlights include 369 stolen bases over 14 years with the Dodgers, Kansas City Royals, Texas Rangers, Colorado Rockies, San Francisco Giants and Chicago Cubs. He posted a major-league career high 66 stolen bases with the Royals in 1996, and a .290 batting average with the Rangers in 1998.

During the 2000 season, Goodwin had only six home runs: two were grand slams while another was an inside-the-park home run. He played in the 2002 World Series, going 0-for-4 as the Giants lost to the Anaheim Angels in seven games. Goodwin recorded his 1000th career hit off of Mike Gallo of the Houston Astros on August 20, 2003.

Goodwin last played in MLB in 2004. He then played in the independent Atlantic League in 2005 for the Atlantic City Surf.

In a 14-year major-league career covering 1288 games, Goodwin posted a .268 batting average with 24 home runs and 284 runs batted in (RBIs); he had a .332 on-base percentage and a .339 slugging percentage. He recorded a .991 fielding percentage, playing at all three outfield positions. In 21 postseason games, he hit .160 (4-for-25) with one run and two RBIs.

== Coaching career ==
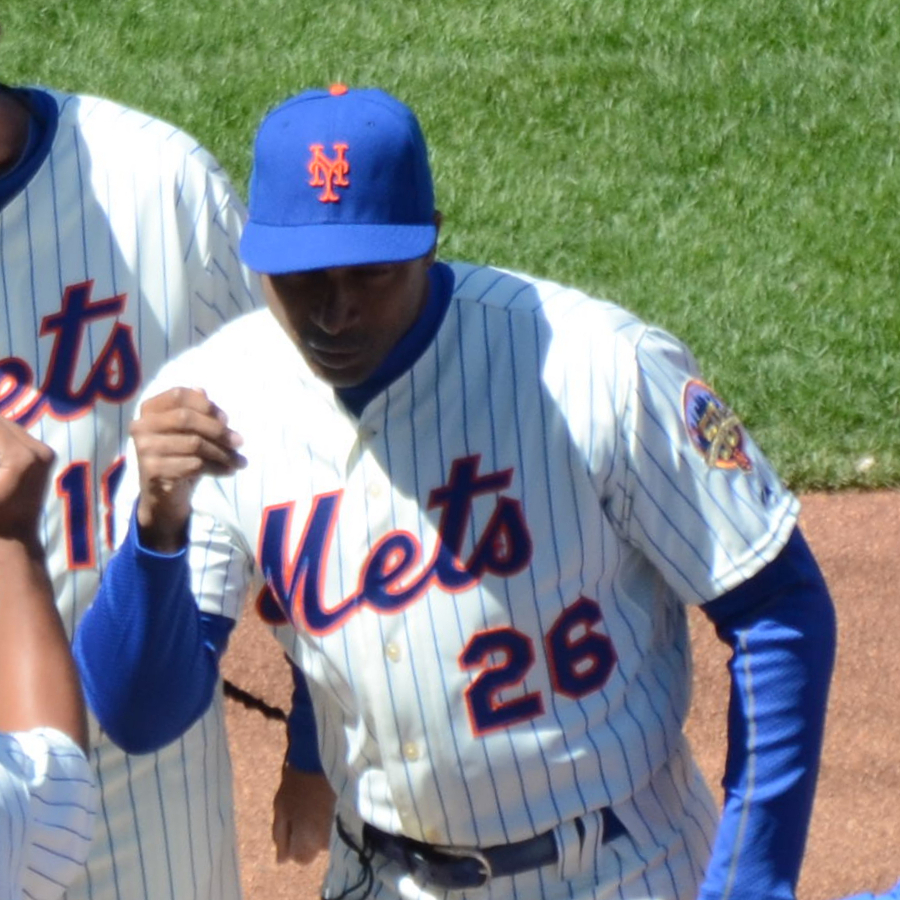
Goodwin with the Mets in 2012.

=== Early career ===
After retiring as a player, Goodwin managed the Lewisville Lizards of the Continental Baseball League, coached for the Lowell Spinners (a minor league affiliate of the Boston Red Sox), and served as a roving outfield instructor and base running coach in the Red Sox' minor league system.

=== New York Mets ===
On October 29, 2011, Goodwin was named first base coach for the New York Mets, succeeding Mookie Wilson.

=== Boston Red Sox ===
On November 2, 2017, Goodwin returned to the Red Sox organization as major-league first base coach on the staff of new manager Alex Cora. Goodwin effectively switched jobs with Rubén Amaro Jr., who moved from the Red Sox to the Mets. Goodwin was a member of the Red Sox coaching staff when the team won the 2018 World Series.

During Boston's 2021 season, Goodwin missed several games in the first-half of August, after being deemed a close contact with Red Sox bench coach Will Venable, after the latter had a positive COVID-19 test. In late August, Goodwin missed several additional games after again being deemed a close contact with personnel who tested positive. Near the end of September, Ramón Vázquez took over as Boston's first base coach in preparation for the playoffs, as MLB mandated that only COVID-vaccinated staff would be allowed in dugouts and on the field during the 2021 postseason, and Goodwin was not in compliance. On October 25, after the Red Sox' season ended with a loss in the ALCS, the team dismissed Goodwin. Goodwin spent the next two seasons as a roving instructor in the Atlanta Braves' minor league system, and was promoted to first base coach at the major league level following the departure of Eric Young Sr. at the end of the 2023 season.

=== Atlanta Braves ===
On November 5, 2025, the Braves hired Antoan Richardson as the team's first base coach, replacing Goodwin.

=== Fresno State ===
In 2026, Goodwin was hired as the director of player development at California State University, Fresno (Fresno State), his alma mater, under head coach Ryan Overland.

== See also ==
- List of Major League Baseball career stolen bases leaders
