= 2008 Fresno State Bulldogs baseball team =

American college baseball season

2008 Fresno State Bulldogs baseball

NCAA Champions WAC Champions WAC Tournament champions
- Conference: Western Athletic Conference
- Record: 47–31 (21–11 WAC)
- Head coach: Mike Batesole
- Home stadium: Beiden Field

The 2008 Fresno State Bulldogs baseball team represented California State University, Fresno in the NCAA Division I baseball season of 2008. They played their home games at Beiden Field in Fresno, California. The team was coached by Mike Batesole who was in his fifth season at Fresno State. Under Batesole, Fresno State has won three Western Athletic Conference championships in a row, and he has a 172-134 record with the Bulldogs.

In a Cinderella run through the postseason, the Fresno State Bulldogs defeated the Georgia Bulldogs in the 2008 College World Series finals to win its first NCAA Division I Championship in baseball. This led to their 3rd national championship in the NCAA organization, adding to their championships in Softball (1998) and Men's Track & Field (1964-Division II).

== Schedule and results ==
Before the season occurred, Fresno State entered the season ranked in the Collegiate Baseball newspaper's Fabulous 40 for the third consecutive season, at #21. Fresno State was also ranked #21 by the preseason magazine Baseball America. Fresno State also was preseason pick of the WAC coaches as the favorite to win the 2008 season; additionally, seven players were selected to the Preseason All-WAC Team, including the preseason Player of the Year Steve Susdorf and Pitcher of the Year Clayton Allison

2008 Fresno State Bulldogs baseball game log
Regular season

February
Date	Opponent	Location	Result
February 22, 2008	UC Davis	Fresno, CA	L 4-2
February 23, 2008	UC Davis	Fresno, CA	L 3-1
February 23, 2008	UC Davis	Fresno, CA	W 7-0
February 24, 2008	UC Davis	Fresno, CA	W 6-3
February 28, 2008	vs California	San Diego, CA	L 14-4
February 29, 2008	at San Diego	San Diego, CA	L 5-2

March
Date	Opponent	Location	Result
March 1, 2008	vs Cal Poly	San Diego, CA	L 2-1
March 2, 2008	at San Diego State	San Diego, CA	W 9-2
March 4, 2008	at Santa Clara	Santa Clara, CA	L 6-5 ^{10}
March 8, 2008	Indiana	Fresno, CA	W 6-2
March 9, 2008	Indiana	Fresno, CA	W 9-4
March 10, 2008	New Mexico State	Fresno, CA	L 13-8
March 11, 2008	Portland	Fresno, CA	L 3-2
March 12, 2008	Indiana	Fresno, CA	L 11-1
March 13, 2008	Gonzaga	Fresno, CA	W 10-1
March 14, 2008	Utah	Fresno, CA	W 10-0
March 15, 2008	Portland	Fresno, CA	W 12-3
March 18, 2008	San Francisco	San Francisco, CA	L 13-8
March 20, 2008	at Hawaii	Honolulu, HI	L 4-0
March 21, 2008	at Hawaii	Honolulu, HI	L 2-0
March 22, 2008	at Hawaii	Honolulu, HI	W 5-0
March 22, 2008	at Hawaii	Honolulu, HI	W 4-2 ^{10}
March 25, 2008	Cal Poly	Fresno, CA	W 10-9
March 26, 2008	Cal Poly	Fresno, CA	W 13-11
March 28, 2008	Nevada	Fresno, CA	W 12-4
March 29, 2008	Nevada	Fresno, CA	W 11-1 ^{7}
March 29, 2008	Nevada	Fresno, CA	L 4-1
March 30, 2008	Nevada	Fresno, CA	W 13-3 ^{7}

April
Date	Opponent	Location	Result
April 1, 2008	Long Beach State	Fresno, CA	W 7-6
April 2, 2008	at California	Berkeley, CA	L 5-4
April 9, 2008	at Cal Poly	San Luis Obispo, CA	L 8-5
April 11, 2008	Louisiana Tech	Fresno, CA	W 14-5
April 12, 2008	Louisiana Tech	Fresno, CA	W 9-8
April 12, 2008	Louisiana Tech	Fresno, CA	W 11-1 ^{7}
April 13, 2008	Louisiana Tech	Fresno, CA	W 8-0
April 15, 2008	at Cal Poly	San Luis Obispo, CA	L 10-7
April 18, 2008	at New Mexico State	Las Cruces, NM	W 13-10
April 19, 2008	at New Mexico State	Las Cruces, NM	W 9-5
April 19, 2008	at New Mexico State	Las Cruces, NM	W 13-1 ^{7}
April 20, 2008	at New Mexico State	Las Cruces, NM	W 24-6 Mercy ^{7}
April 22, 2008	Santa Clara	Fresno, CA	L 10-8
April 23, 2008	San Francisco	Fresno, CA	W 5-4
April 25, 2008	at Nevada	Reno, NV	W 9-3
April 26, 2008	at Nevada	Reno, NV	L 4-1
April 26, 2008	at Nevada	Reno, NV	L 7-3
April 27, 2008	at Nevada	Reno, NV	L 12-11
April 30, 2008	at San Francisco	San Francisco, CA	L 7-6

May
Date	Opponent	Location	Result
May 2, 2008	New Mexico State	Fresno, CA	W 11-8
May 3, 2008	New Mexico State	Fresno, CA	L 9-2
May 3, 2008	New Mexico State	Fresno, CA	L 12-7
May 4, 2008	New Mexico State	Fresno, CA	W 6-4
May 6, 2008	at Long Beach State	Long Beach, CA	L 2-1
May 9, 2008	San Jose State	Fresno, CA	W 11-3
May 10, 2008	San Jose State	Fresno, CA	W 9-8
May 10, 2008	San Jose State	Fresno, CA	W 5-3
May 11, 2008	San Jose State	Fresno, CA	L 2-1
May 16, 2008	at Sacramento State	Sacramento, CA	L 9-8
May 17, 2008	at Sacramento State	Sacramento, CA	L 4-0
May 17, 2008	at Sacramento State	Sacramento, CA	W 6-4
May 18, 2008	at Sacramento State	Sacramento, CA	W 13-6

Postseason

WAC Tournament
Date	Opponent	Location	Result
May 22, 2008	vs Sacramento State	Ruston, LA	W 3-2
May 23, 2008	vs San Jose State	Ruston, LA	W 7-3
May 24, 2008	vs Hawaii	Ruston, LA	W 11-4
May 25, 2008	vs Nevada	Ruston, LA	W 6-4

NCAA Long Beach Regional
May 30, 2008	at Long Beach State	Long Beach, CA	W 7-3
May 31, 2008	vs San Diego	Long Beach, CA	W 6-0
June 1, 2008	vs San Diego	Long Beach, CA	L 15-1
June 2, 2008	vs San Diego	Long Beach, CA	W 5-1

NCAA Tempe Super Regional
June 7, 2008	at Arizona State	Tempe, AZ	L 12-4
June 8, 2008	at Arizona State	Tempe, AZ	W 8-6
June 9, 2008	at Arizona State	Tempe, AZ	W 12-9

College World Series
June 15, 2008	vs Rice	Omaha, NE	W 17-5
June 17, 2008	vs North Carolina	Omaha, NE	W 5-3
June 21, 2008	vs North Carolina	Omaha, NE	L 4-3
June 22, 2008	vs North Carolina	Omaha, NE	W 6-1
June 23, 2008	vs Georgia	Omaha, NE	L 7-6
June 24, 2008	vs Georgia	Omaha, NE	W 19-10
June 25, 2008	vs Georgia	Omaha, NE	W 6-1

== Roster ==
=== Coaches ===
Name	Title	First season at Fresno State	Alma mater
Mike Batesole	Head coach	2003	Fullerton State University (1990)
Pat Waer	Assistant coach	2006	Washington State University (1995)
Matt Curtis	Assistant coach	2002	Fresno State University (1996)
Mike Mayne	Assistant coach	2007	University of California—Riverside (1968)

=== Players ===
No.	Players	Position	Year	Ht/wt	Bats/throws	Hometown (last school)
3	Erik Wetzel	INF	JR	6-1/180	R/R	Chino, CA (Don Lugo HS)
4	Danny Grubb	C	JR	5-11/185	R/R	Orange, CA (Orange Lutheran HS)
5	Trent Soares	OF	FR	6-0/180	L/R	Fresno, CA (San Joaquin Memorial High School)
7	Nick Hom	INF	FR	6-0/180	R/R	Benicia, CA (De La Salle HS)
9	Alan Ahmady	INF	SO	5-11/195	R/R	Fresno, CA (Clovis West HS)
10	Jason Breckley	RHP	SR	6-1/220	R/R	Moorpark, CA (Moorpark HS)
11	Todd Sandell	INF	SR	6-2/190	R/R	Somis, CA (Camarillo HS)
14	Tanner Scheppers	RHP	JR	6-4/220	R/R	Laguna Niguel, CA (Dana Hills HS)
15	Steve Detwiler	OF	SO	6-1/220	R/R	Forest Knolls, CA (San Rafael HS)
16	Danny Muno	INF	FR	5-11/170	S/R	Thousand Oaks, CA (Loyola HS)
19	Jordan Ribera	INF	FR	6-0/220	L/R	Fresno, CA (Clovis West HS)
21	Justin Wilson	LHP	JR	6-3/210	L/L	Clovis, CA (Buchanan HS)
24	Ryan Overland	C	SR	6-2/200	L/R	Atascadero, CA (Atascadero HS)
25	Brandon Burke	RHP	SR	6-3/200	R/R	San Diego, CA (Rancho Bernardo HS)
27	Steve Susdorf	OF	SR	6-1/195	L/L	Newhall, CA (Hart HS)
29	Gavin Hedstrom	OF	JR	6-1/190	R/R	Irvine, CA (Woodbridge HS)
30	Blake Amador	OF	SR	6-0/190	L/L	Turlock, CA (Modesto JC/UNLV)
32	Tommy Mendonca	INF	SO	6-1/200	L/R	Turlock, CA (Turlock HS)
33	Justin Miller	RHP	JR	6-5/195	R/R	Bakersfield, CA (Bakersfield College)
34	Jake Johnson	C	FR	6-2/205	R/R	La Mirada, CA (La Mirada HS)
37	Sean Bonesteele	RHP	SO	6-5/220	R/R	Santa Ana, CA (Foothill HS)
38	Jake Floethe	RHP	FR	6-3/195	R/R	Lafayette, CA (Acalanes HS)
40	Clayton Allison	RHP	SR	6-5/230	R/R	Visalia, CA (College of the Sequoias)
42	Gene Escat	RHP	FR	6-4/190	R/R	Hanford, CA (Hanford HS)
43	Kris Tomlinson	LHP	JR	6-0/180	L/L	Visalia, CA (Golden West HS)
47	Holden Sprague	RHP	JR	6-2/210	R/R	Fresno, CA (Bullard HS)
50	Jake Hower	RHP	SR	6-4/190	R/R	Roseville, CA (American River CC)

== Awards and honors ==
Player	Award/Honor
Clayton Allison	WAC Pitcher of the Week (April 16 - April 27)
Alan Ahmady	WAC Player of the Week and NCWBA National Player of the Week (March 24 - March 30), First-Team All-WAC, WAC All-Tournament Team.
Steve Susdorf	WAC Player of the Week (April 16 - April 27), First-Team All-WAC WAC Player of the Year 2008, ESPN The Magazine Academic All-American
Justin Wilson	WAC Pitcher of the Week (May 7 - May 13)
Mike Batesole	NCBWA National Coach of the Year Award

== 2008 Major League Baseball draft ==
The following members of the 2008 Fresno State baseball team were drafted in the 2008 MLB draft.

Player	Position	Overall	MLB team
Justin Wilson	LHP	144	Pittsburgh Pirates
Erik Wetzel	2B	407	Colorado Rockies
Justin Miller	RHP	483	Texas Rangers
Steven Susdorf	OF	586	Philadelphia Phillies
Clayton Allison	RHP	817	Los Angeles Dodgers
