= Matt Curtis =

American baseball coach (born 1974)

Biographical details
- Born: August 14, 1974 (age 51); Visalia, California, U.S.

Playing career
- 1993–1996: Fresno State
- Position: Catcher

Coaching career (HC unless noted)
- 2000–2010: Fresno State (asst.)
- 2011–2013: Cal State Northridge
- 2014–2015: USC (asst.)
- 2016–2019: USC (assoc. HC)
- 2020–2021: Loyola Marymount (H)

Head coaching record
- Overall: 77–89 (.464)

Matthew Aaron Curtis (born August 14, 1974) is an American college baseball coach and former catcher. He played college baseball at Fresno State University from 1993 to 1996 for coach Bob Bennett. He was the head coach of the California State University, Northridge from 2011 to 2013.

== Playing career ==
Curtis was a four year starting catcher at Fresno State, where he still ranks in the top ten in many categories, including games, hits, at-bats, RBI, and runs. He led the Western Athletic Conference in doubles with 22 in 1995. Selected by the California Angels in the 28th round of the 1996 Major League Baseball draft, Curtis played professionally from 1996 to 2000 in the California (later Anaheim) Angels and Cleveland Indians organizations, reaching Class-AA in both systems. He was highly rated as a prospect early in his minor league career.

== Coaching career ==
After ending his playing career, Curtis became a volunteer assistant coach, working with catchers for three seasons. He became a full time staff member in 2003 and later took over recruiting responsibilities. During his time with the Bulldogs, the team won the 2008 National Championship and five straight WAC titles. He became head coach at Cal State Northridge after ten seasons at his alma mater. Following the 2013 season, Northridge did not renew his contract.

Curtis became an assistant coach at USC under Dan Hubbs in 2014. Since 2016, Curtis has been associate head coach at USC.

== Head coaching record ==
The following table shows Curtis' record as a head coach.

Statistics overview
Season	Team	Overall	Conference	Standing	Postseason
Cal State Northridge Matadors (Big West Conference) (2011–2013)
2011	Cal State Northridge	23–33	6–18	9th	
2012	Cal State Northridge	23–30	10–14	7th	
2013	Cal State Northridge	31–26	15–12	T–4th	
Cal State Northridge:		77–89 (.464)	31–44 (.413)		
Total:		77–89 (.464)			
