= George Valesente =

American baseball coach (born 1945)

Biographical details
- Born: 1945 (age 80–81)

Playing career
- 1963–1966: Ithaca
- 1967: Lexington Braves
- 1967: Geneva Senators
- 1968: Burlington Senators
- 1969: Buffalo Bisons
- 1969: Savannah Senators
- 1970: Pittsfield Senators
- 1970: Burlington Senators
- Positions: Pitcher, First baseman

Coaching career (HC unless noted)
- 1973–1974: Brockport (NY)
- 1975–1976: New Paltz (NY)
- 1977–1978: SUNY Maritime
- 1979–2019: Ithaca

Head coaching record
- Overall: 1,204–544–8 (.688)

Accomplishments and honors

Championships
- Division III College World Series Champions 1980 and 1988

Awards
- American Baseball Coaches Association Hall of Fame (2005) American Baseball Coaches Association Division III Coach of the Year (1980 and 1988)

George R. Valesente (born 1945) is a retired college baseball coach who is the former head coach of the Ithaca Bombers.

== Career ==
Valesente graduated from Ithaca College in 1996. He coached for 41 seasons at his alma mater, from 1979 until 2019.

He was inducted into the ABCA Hall of Fame in 2005. He won his 1,000th game as a coach in 2012. In 2014, he was inducted into the New York State Baseball Hall of Fame. In 2015, Valesente earned his 1,000th win as Ithaca's head coach on March 14 and, a month later, his 1,100th career coaching win on April 18. He retired with an all-time record 1,136–507–8 at Ithaca College and a 1,196–547–8 overall in 47 seasons as a head coach. When he retired, Ithaca had a winning season in a record 81 consecutive seasons.

Valesente coached the Bombers to two NCAA Division III national championships (1980 and 1988), 10 World Series appearances and 35 Division III postseason berths in all. His teams never had a losing season and had won nearly 70 percent of their games. At Ithaca, his teams won 27 league titles and four runner-up finishes. Ithaca has won 17 of the 20 Empire 8 titles. Valesente coached 31 All-Americans and 42 players who signed professional baseball contracts. One Ithaca player, Tim Locastro, played in Major League Baseball.

Valesente won many coaching awards. He was voted the American Baseball Coaches Association (ABCA) Division III Coach of the Year in 1980 and 1988. and he earned district coach of the year recognition in 1980, 1981, 1986, 1988, 1991, 1992, 1994 and 2013. In 2012, he was named D3baseball.com's first NCAA New York Region Coach of the Year and earned his eighth Empire 8 Coach of the Year award. He won both awards again in 2013. Valesente won 11 Empire 8 Coach of the Year awards, with his last coming in 2019. He was inducted into the ABCA Hall of Fame in 2005. In 2012, Ithaca renamed its baseball field in Valesente's honor.

Before becoming a coach, Valesente played baseball at Ithaca. After graduating he pitched and played first base in Minor League Baseball from 1967 to 1970 in the Atlanta Braves, Washington Senators, and Houston Astros organizations. His highest level of play was pitching 4 games for the Triple-A Buffalo Bisons in 1969.

Valesente's older brother Bob Valesente also attended Ithaca, then played Minor League Baseball in 1963 and 1964. He became a football coach, serving as the head coach of the Kansas Jayhawks in 1986 and 1987 and as an assistant coach in college and professional football.

Valesente's son David Valesente played in Minor League Baseball in 2012 and 2013. He became Ithaca's head coach in August 2019, succeeding his father.

== See also ==
- List of college baseball career coaching wins leaders
