= 2002 NCAA Division II men's soccer tournament =

2002 NCAA Division II Men's Soccer Championship
Tournament details
- Country: United States
- Teams: 16

Final positions
- Champions: Sonoma State (1st title, 2nd final)
- Runners-up: Southern New Hampshire (2nd final)

Tournament statistics
- Matches played: 15
- Goals scored: 56 (3.73 per match)

Awards
- Best player: Offense: Tony Bussard, Sonoma State; Defense: Matt Bernard, Sonoma State

The 2002 NCAA Division II Men's Soccer Championship was the 31st annual tournament held by the NCAA to determine the top men's Division II college soccer program in the United States.

On the strength of three 2nd half goals Sonoma State (19-3-1) defeated Southern New Hampshire in the tournament final, 4–3.

This was the first national title for the Seawolves, who were coached by Marcus Ziemer. Sonoma State had previously been College Cup finalists in 1991.

== Bracket ==
First Round; *Campus sites
*	CSU Dominguez Hills	2
Sonoma State	3(2OT)
*	Incarnate Word	2
Midwestern State	3
*	Barry	1
Cent Arkansas	2(2OT)
*	USC Spartanburg	1
Queens (NC)	0
*	Southern N.H.	1
Southern Conn.	0
*	West Chester	1(2)
East Stroudsburg	1(4)
*	Mercyhurst	6
UDC	0
*	Rockhurst	2
Lewis (IL)	1

Quarterfinals; *Campus sites
*	Sonoma State	3
Midwestern State	0
Cent Arkansas	3
*	USC Spartanburg	0
*	Southern N.H.	5
East Stroudsburg	3
*	Mercyhurst	2
Rockhurst	0

Semifinals; December 6 Virginia Beach, VA
Sonoma State	2(2OT)
Cent Arkansas	1
Southern N.H.	2
Mercyhurst	1

Final; December 8 Virginia Beach, VA
Sonoma State	4
Southern N.H.	3

== Final ==
December 8, 2002
12:00 EST (UTC−5)

Sonoma State	4–3	Southern New Hampshire
Brian Coyne 34:40' (Maycock); Brandon Boone 48:25'; Michael Nathan 73:48' (Giuliacci); Tony Bussard 76:04' (Maycock)	Report 1 Report 2	Anthony Augustine 14:24' (Tajiou), (red card) 83'; Mounir Tajiou 35:16' (Borrill); Mike Savastra (red card) 83'; Romelle Burgess 89:52' (Kagan)

Virginia Beach Sportsplex, Virginia Beach, Virginia
Attendance: 397

== See also ==
- NCAA Division I Men's Soccer Championship
- NCAA Division III Men's Soccer Championship
- NAIA Men's Soccer Championship
