= Tim Pettorini =

American baseball coach

Tim Pettorini is an American baseball coach, who was the head coach of the College of Wooster baseball team from 1970 until 2019.

== Coaching career ==
Pettorini has coached Wooster to many winning seasons including a winning percentage of 80 percent over the past 17 years (613–180–1; .783). The Wooster Fighting Scots went on to win the league-leading 14th NCAC championship (1985, 1987, 1988, 1990, 1991, 1995, 1998, 2002, 2004, 2005, 2006, 2009, 2010, 2012).

== See also ==
- List of college baseball career coaching wins leaders
