= Mike Batesole =

American baseball coach (born 1964)

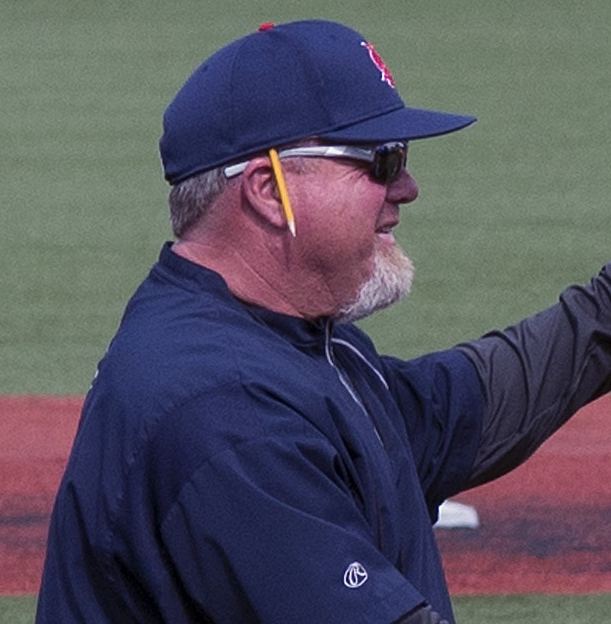
- Batesole in 2017 at Falcon Baseball Field.

Biographical details
- Born: March 28, 1964 (age 62); Anaheim, California, U.S.
- Education: California State University, Fullerton

Playing career
- 1983–1985: Oral Roberts
- Position: Third baseman

Coaching career (HC unless noted)
- 1986–1987: Orange Coast (asst.)
- 1991: Orange Coast (asst.)
- 1993: Cypress (asst.)
- 1994–1995: Cal State Northridge (asst.)
- 1996–2002: Cal State Northrdge
- 2003–2022: Fresno State

Head coaching record
- Overall: 828–615–1 (.574)
- Tournaments: NCAA: 18–12

Accomplishments and honors

Championships
- College World Series (2008); WAC Western Division (1996); 7× WAC tournament (1996, 2006, 2007, 2008, 2009, 2011, 2012); 6× WAC regular season (2002, 2006, 2007, 2008, 2010, 2011); Big West regular season (2002); 2× MW regular season (2016, 2019); MW tournament (2019)

Awards
- 2× Collegiate Baseball National Coach of the Year (1998, 2008); Big West Coach of the Year (2002); 2× MW Coach of the Year (2016, 2019)

Michael Harold Batesole (born March 28, 1964) is a former American college baseball coach. He previously served as coach of the Cal State Northridge Matadors (1996–2002) and the Fresno State Bulldogs (2003–2022).

== Early life, playing career, and education ==
Born in Anaheim, California, Batesole graduated from Garden Grove High School in 1982 and began his college baseball career at Oral Roberts University. At Oral Roberts, Batesole started at third base from 1983 to 1985 and finished with a .285 batting average, 31 home runs, and 148 runs batted in.

From 1985 to 1988, Batesole played minor league baseball in the Los Angeles Dodgers organization. In 1990, Batesole completed his bachelor's degree in kinesiology at California State University, Fullerton. He later completed a master's degree in biomechanics from the same university. During his graduate studies, Batesole was an instructor in the Health and Physical Education Department.

== Coaching career ==
=== Assistant coach (1986–1995) ===
From 1986 to 1987 and again in 1991, Batesole was an assistant coach at Orange Coast College, a junior college in Costa Mesa, California. After completing his master's degree, Batesole was an assistant coach at another Southern California junior college in the 1993 season, Cypress College.

Batesole joined the coaching staff of Bill Kernen at Cal State Northridge in July 1993. As an assistant, Batesole specialized in coaching infielders and calling the offense.

=== Cal State Northridge (1996–2002) ===
Following the resignation of Kernen in August 1995, Cal State Northridge promoted Batesole to interim head coach. Batesole led Cal State Northridge to a 52–18 record, NCAA Regionals runner-up appearance, and first Western Athletic Conference (WAC) title in school history in his debut season of 1996. Cal State Northridge promoted Batesole long-term as head coach in July 1996.

Batesole led Cal State Northridge through its transition out of the WAC to independence (1997 to 2000) to the Big West Conference in 2001. In its first year of independence in 1997, Cal State Northridge went 42–20–1. After leading a team largely consisting of freshmen and junior college transfers to a 37–19 record in 1998, Batesole earned National Coach of the Year honors from Collegiate Baseball.

The Big West Coach of the Year in 2002, Batesole reached his 250th career win that season and led Cal State Northridge to a 41–17 season, its first Big West title, as well as an NCAA Regionals appearance. In seven seasons from 1996 to 2002, Batesole led Cal State Northridge to a cumulative 256–158–1 record, the second most wins for a head coach in program history.

=== Fresno State (2003–2022) ===
On May 28, 2002, California State University, Fresno hired Batesole to be head coach of the Fresno State Bulldogs baseball team following the retirement of 34-year head coach Bob Bennett.

Batesole led Fresno State to six WAC tournament titles: four straight from 2006 to 2009 and two more in 2011 and 2012, in addition to five WAC regular season titles: three straight from 2006 to 2008 and two more from 2010 to 2011. Fresno State moved from the WAC to Mountain West Conference (MW) beginning in the 2013 season. In 2016, Fresno State won the MW regular season title for its first championship in that conference, for which Batesole won MW Coach of the Year honors.

On December 8, 2022, Batesole retired from coaching.

==== 2008 national championship ====
In 2008, he coached Fresno State to their first College World Series appearance in seventeen years by defeating #3 Arizona State, and then defeating #6 Rice University, #2 University of North Carolina to advance to the championship, and then defeating #8 University of Georgia in the final two games in a best two-out-of-three championship series winning 19–10 in the second game, and 6–1 in the third game to win Fresno State their first NCAA Men's Championship.

== Head coaching records ==
The following is a list of Batesole's yearly records as an NCAA head baseball coach.

Record table
Season	Team	Overall	Conference	Standing	Postseason
Cal State Northridge Matadors (Western Athletic Conference) (1996)
1996	Cal State Northridge	52–18	21–9	1st (West)	NCAA Regional
Cal State Northridge Matadors (NCAA Division I independent) (1997–2000)
1997	Cal State Northridge	42–20–1			
1998	Cal State Northridge	37–19			
1999	Cal State Northridge	27–29			
2000	Cal State Northridge	23–33			
Cal State Northridge Matadors (Big West Conference) (2001–2002)
2001	Cal State Northridge	34–22	9–9	4th	
2002	Cal State Northridge	41–17	19–5	1st	NCAA Regional
Cal State Northridge:		256–158–1 (.618)	49–23 (.681)		
Fresno State Bulldogs (Western Athletic Conference) (2003–2012)
2003	Fresno State	30–29	14–16	3rd	
2004	Fresno State	29–29	17–12	2nd	
2005	Fresno State	30–29	16–14	2nd	
2006	Fresno State	45–18	18–6	1st	NCAA Regional
2007	Fresno State	38–29	17–7	1st	NCAA Regional
2008	Fresno State	47–31	21–11	1st	College World Series champions
2009	Fresno State	32–30	12–12	T–3rd	NCAA Regional
2010	Fresno State	38–25	16–8	1st	
2011	Fresno State	40–16	17–7	T–1st	NCAA Regional
2012	Fresno State	31–28	8–10	5th	NCAA Regional
Fresno State Bulldogs (Mountain West Conference) (2013–2022)
2013	Fresno State	23–33	14–16	4th	
2014	Fresno State	28–29	13–17	5th	
2015	Fresno State	31–28	18–12	3rd	
2016	Fresno State	36–22	21–9	1st	
2017	Fresno State	35–24	18–12	3rd	
2018	Fresno State	30–27	13–17	4th	
2019	Fresno State	38–14–1	20–8–1	1st	NCAA Regional
2020	Fresno State	9–7	0–0		Season canceled due to COVID-19
2021	Fresno State	20–25	16–18	5th	
2022	Fresno State	27–28	15–15	T–4th	
Fresno State:		599–485 (.553)	148–121 (.550)		
Total:		855–643–1 (.571)			
National champion Postseason invitational champion Conference regular season champion Conference regular season and conference tournament champion Division regular season champion Division regular season and conference tournament champion Conference tournament champion
