= List of college baseball career coaching wins leaders =

This is a list of college baseball coaches by number of career wins. This list includes coaches who have won at least 1,100 games at the NCAA and NAIA levels. Mike Martin, the former head coach of Florida State, tops the list with 2,029 career wins. The highest winning percentage in the group belongs to Don Schaly, former head coach of Marietta, with an .812 career winning percentage.

After Paul Mainieri and South Carolina parted ways during the 2026 season, Bobby Halford of William Carey (NAIA) became the active wins leader with 1,416 wins. The active NCAA wins leader across all divisions is John Schaly of Ashland with 1,388 wins. The NCAA Division I active wins leader is Dave Van Horn of Arkansas with 1,345 wins.

The list is complete through the completion of the 2026 season.

== College baseball coaches with 1,100 career wins ==
=== Key ===
*	Denote manager is active
†	Member of the National College Baseball Hall of Fame

=== Coaches ===
Updated through end of 2026 season

Rank	Name	Years	Wins	Losses	Ties	Pct.	Teams
1	Mike Martin^{†}	40	2,029	736	4	.733	Florida State (1980–2019)
2	Augie Garrido^{†}	48	1,975	951	9	.674	San Francisco State (1969), Cal Poly (1970–1972), Cal State Fullerton (1973–1987, 1991–1996), Illinois (1988–1990), Texas (1997–2016)
3	Gordie Gillespie^{†}	59	1,893	952	1	.665	Lewis (1953–1976), St. Francis (Ill.) (1977–1995, 2006-2011), Ripon (1996–2005)
4	Gene Stephenson^{†}	36	1,768	675	3	.723	Wichita State (1978–2013)
5	Ed Cheff^{†}	34	1,705	430	2	.799	Lewis-Clark State (1977–2010)
6	Woody Hunt	40	1,630	774	5	.678	Cumberland (TN) (1980–2021)
7	Mark Marquess^{†}	40	1,627	878	7	.649	Stanford (1977–2017)
8	Denney Crabaugh	34	1,601	493	2	.764	Oklahoma City (1989–2022)
9	Jim Morris^{†}	37	1,594	716	4	.690	Georgia Tech (1982–1993), Miami (FL) (1994–2018)
10	Paul Mainieri	41	1,545	817	8	.654	St. Thomas (FL) (1983–1988), Air Force (1989–1994), Notre Dame (1995–2006), LSU (2007–2021), South Carolina (2025–2026)
11	Larry Hays^{†}	38	1,508	860	4	.637	Lubbock Christian (1971–1986), Texas Tech (1987–2008)
12	Mike Fox	37	1,487	547	5	.731	NC Wesleyan (1983–1994, 1996–1998), North Carolina (1999–2020)
13	Danny Hall	38	1,452	793	1	.647	Kent State (1988–1993), Georgia Tech (1994–2025)
14	Chuck Hartman	47	1,444	816	8	.638	High Point (1960–1978), Virginia Tech (1979–2006)
15	Don Schaly^{†}	40	1,438	329	13	.812	Marietta (1964–2003)
16	Cliff Gustafson^{†}	29	1,427	373	2	.792	Texas (1968–1996)
17	Bobby Halford*	41	1,416	834	0	.629	William Carey (1986–present)
18	Bill Holowaty^{†}	44	1,412	528	7	.727	Eastern Connecticut State (1969–2012)
19	Keith Guttin	42	1,396	929	0	.600	Missouri State (1983–2024)
20	John Anderson	43	1,390	1,021	3	.576	Minnesota (1982–2024)
21	John Schaly*	39	1,388	756	4	.647	Barry (1988–1991), Saint Leo (FL) (1992–1997), Ashland (1998–present)
22	Bobby Cox	35	1,378	643	0	.682	Oklahoma Baptist (1985–2019)
23	Ron Polk^{†}	35	1,373	702	2	.662	Georgia Southern (1972–1975), Mississippi State (1976–1997, 2002–2008), Georgia (2000–2001)
24	Gary Gilmore	35	1,371	699	5	.662	South Carolina Aiken (1990–1995), Coastal Carolina (1996–2024)
25	Jim Gilligan	40	1,353	895	7	.602	Western New Mexico (1972), Lamar (1973–1986, 1992–2016)
26	Lou Yacinich	45	1,347	1,058	0	.560	Grand View (1974–2022)
27	Bob Babb	46	1,346	483	16	.734	Johns Hopkins (1980–2025)
28	Dave Van Horn*	33	1,345	662	0	.670	Central Missouri State (1994), Northwestern State (1995–1997), Nebraska (1998–2002), Arkansas (2003–present)
29	Rod Dedeaux^{†}	44	1,342	597	16	.691	USC (1942–1947, 1949–1986)
30	Jack Leggett	36	1,332	770	1	.634	Vermont (1978–1982), Western Carolina (1983–1991), Clemson (1994–2015)
31	Larry Cochell	39	1,331	813	3	.621	Emporia State (1967–1969), Creighton (1970–1971), Cal State Los Angeles (1972–1976), Oral Roberts (1977–1986), Northwestern (1987), Cal State Fullerton (1988–1990), Oklahoma (1991–2005)
32	Elliott Avent	38	1,327	871	2	.604	New Mexico State (1989–1996), NC State (1997–2026)
33	Mike Metheny^{†}	37	1,324	679	3	.668	Southeastern Oklahoma State (1981–2017)
34	Tom Austin	46	1,318	632	10	.675	Methodist University (1980–2025)
35	Joe Roberts	34	1,314	640	6	.672	Armstrong Atlantic (1980–2013)
36	Pete Dunn	37	1,312	887	3	.597	Stetson (1980–2016)
37	Tommy Thomas^{†}	40	1,308	825	6	.613	Valdosta State (1968–2007)
38	Bob Bennett^{†}	34	1,300	757	8	.631	Fresno State (1967, 1970–2002)
39	Ron Fraser^{†}	30	1,267	440	9	.741	Miami (FL) (1963–1992)
40	Jack Stallings	39	1,255	799	10	.610	Wake Forest (1960–1968), Florida State (1969–1974), Georgia Southern 1976–1999
41	Charlie Migl	35	1,246	600	0	.675	St. Mary's (TX) (1987–2021)
42	Tim Pettorini	38	1,243	460	6	.729	Wooster (1982–2019)
42	Greg Guilliams*	36	1,243	618	2	.668	Penn State–Behrend (1991), Embry–Riddle (FL) (1992–2007), Valdosta State (2008–2024), Flagler (2025–Present)
44	Q. V. Lowe	28	1,242	689	5	.643	Auburn Montgomery (1987–2014)
44	Itch Jones	39	1,242	752	6	.623	MacMurray (1966–1968), Southern Illinois (1970–1990), Illinois (1991–2005)
46	Rich Hill*	39	1,235	842	4	.594	Cal Lutheran (1988–1993), San Francisco (1994–1998), San Diego (1999–2021), Hawaii (2022–present)
47	Jim Dietz	31	1,230	751	18	.620	San Diego State (1972–2002)
48	Jay Bergman	32	1,210	707	3	.631	Florida (1976–1981), UCF (1983–2008)
49	Al Ogletree	40	1,208	710	1	.630	Dallas (1958–1965), Sul Ross State (1966–1968), Texas–Pan American (1969–1997)
50	George Valesente	47	1,204	544	8	.688	Brockport (1973–1974), SUNY New Paltz (1975–1976), SUNY Maritime (1977–1978), Ithaca (1979–2019)
51	Jim Mallon	34	1,196	602	1	.665	Southwestern (1971–2004)
52	Scott Berry	42	1,196	698	1	.631	Mayville State (1982–2023)
53	Jeff Sikes	39	1,189	886	5	.573	Warner (FL) (1982–2023)
54	Keith Veale*	37	1,188	642	0	.649	Mount Vernon Nazarene (1990–present)
55	Mike Laird*	44	1,184	720	3	.622	William Penn (1983–present)
55	Jeff Messer*	41	1,184	778	5	.603	Slippery Rock (1986–Present)
57	Andy Lopez^{†}	33	1,177	742	7	.613	Cal State Dominguez Hills (1983–1988), Pepperdine (1989–1994), Florida (1995–2001), Arizona (2002–2015)
58	John Goelz	38	1,175	836	5	.587	Sonoma State (1986–2024)
59	Wayne Graham^{†}	26	1,173	528	2	.689	Rice (1992–2018)
59	Tony Robichaux	36	1,173	765	2	.605	McNeese State (1987–1994), Louisiana (1995–2019)
61	Gary Adams	35	1,172	892	12	.567	UC Irvine (1970–1974), UCLA (1975–2004)
62	Chris Hanks*	28	1,164	435	0	.722	Colorado Mesa (1999–present)
63	Bill Wilhelm^{†}	36	1,161	536	10	.683	Clemson (1958–1993)
63	Norm DeBriyn	33	1,161	650	6	.641	Arkansas (1970–2002)
65	Jack Coffey^{†}	47	1,160	482	13	.705	Fordham (1909–1917, 1919–1921, 1923–1943, 1945–1958)
66	Chuck Brayton^{†}	33	1,158	525	6	.687	Washington State (1962–1994)
66	Mike Sansing	33	1,158	693	0	.626	Shorter (1989–1991), Kennesaw State (1992–2021)
68	Mike Gillespie	30	1,156	720	2	.616	USC (1987–2006), UC Irvine (2008–2018)
69	Ken Dugan^{†}	37	1,137	450	0	.716	Lipscomb (1960–1996)
70	Ray Tanner	25	1,133	489	3	.698	NC State (1988–1996), South Carolina (1997–2012)
70	Ed Flaherty	39	1,133	532	4	.680	Southern Maine (1986–2024)
72	Frank Vieira^{†}	44	1,127	324	6	.776	New Haven (1963–2006)
73	Bob Fornelli	29	1,120	495	0	.693	Fort Hayes State (1997–2003), Emporia State (2004–2018), Pittsburg State (2019–2025)
74	Joe Urso*	26	1,113	306	1	.784	Tampa (2001–present)
75	Don Brandon	38	1,110	588	5	.653	Anderson (IN) (1972, 1974–2010)
76	Jim Harp	27	1,107	553	2	.660	Dallas Baptist (1973–1999)
77	Rick Heller*	39	1,107	823	6	.573	Upper Iowa (1988–1999), Northern Iowa (2000–2009), Indiana State (2010–2013), Iowa (2014–present)
78	Tim Corbin*	30	1,103	624	1	.639	Presbyterian (1988–1993), Vanderbilt (2003–present)
79	Steve Owens*	35	1,101	636	3	.634	Cortland (1992–1999), Le Moyne (2000–2010), Bryant (2011–2019), Rutgers (2020–present)

== See also ==
- List of current NCAA Division I baseball coaches
- List of Major League Baseball managerial wins and winning percentage leaders
- American Baseball Coaches Association
- National Collegiate Baseball Writers Association
