= Tommy Mendonca =

American baseball player (born 1988)

- Third baseman
- Born: April 12, 1988 (age 37); Turlock, California, U.S.
- Bats: Left Throws: Right
- Stats at Baseball Reference

Career highlights and awards
- College World Series Most Outstanding Player (2008)
Medals
Men's baseball
Representing United States
World University Championship
Gold medal – first place	2008 Brno	National team
Pan American Games
Silver medal – second place	2011 Guadalajara	National team

Thomas Wilkey Mendonca (born April 12, 1988) is an American former professional baseball third baseman. Mendonca won the 2008 College World Series Most Outstanding Player award while a sophomore at Fresno State University.

== Amateur career ==
Mendonca attended Turlock High School. In 2006, he hit .429 with six home runs.

He attended Fresno State University and played college baseball for the Bulldogs. In 67 games with Fresno in 2007, Mendonca hit .281 with 10 home runs and 37 RBI. In 77 games in 2008, he hit .285 with 19 homers and 70 RBI. Mendonca was on the 2008 Bulldogs College World Series winning team, and was named the College World Series Most Outstanding Player.

== Professional career ==
Mendonca was drafted in the second round (62nd overall) by the Texas Rangers in the 2009 Major League Baseball draft. He began his professional career in 2009, playing for the Low Single-A Spokane Indians (49 games) and High Single-A Bakersfield Blaze (11 games), hitting a combined .290 with nine home runs and 28 RBI in 60 games. In 2010, he hit .248 with 10 home runs and 47 RBI in 120 games for the Blaze and in 2011, he hit .278 with 25 home runs, 78 RBI and 160 strikeouts in 125 games for the Double-A Frisco RoughRiders. He split the 2012 campaign between the RoughRiders (28 games) and Round Rock Express (63 games), hitting a combined .229 with 12 home runs and 51 RBI in 91 games.

Mendonca was selected by the Oakland Athletics in the Triple-A phase of the 2012 Rule 5 draft. Oakland released Mendonca in April 2013, without him appearing in a game for their organization. He signed with the Philadelphia Phillies on a minor league deal on May 11, and played for the Reading Fightin Phils until he was released on June 6, 2013.

He signed with the Camden Riversharks of the Atlantic League and finished the 2013 season with them. He played with the Sioux City Explorers of the American Association in 2014, 2015, and 2016. He played for the Lincoln Saltdogs in 2017. In 2018, he split the season between the Winnipeg Goldeyes and the Fargo-Moorhead Redhawks.

== Personal ==
His uncle, Robert Mendonca, played in the Philadelphia Phillies organization.
