= Don Schaly =

American baseball coach (1937–2005)

Biographical details
- Born: October 9, 1937; Ellwood City, Pennsylvania
- Died: March 9, 2005 (aged 67); Venice, Florida
- Education: Bachelor of Arts, Marietta College (1959); Master of Arts, Penn State (1960)

Coaching career (HC unless noted)
- 1964–2003: Marietta

Head coaching record
- Overall: 1,442–329

Accomplishments and honors

Championships
- 3 NCAA Division III Tournament (1981, 1983, 1986); 27 OAC

Awards
- 4× National Coach of the Year (1975, 1981, 1983, 1986); Coach of the Century by Collegiate Baseball; ABCA Hall of Fame (1995)
- College Baseball Hall of Fame; Inducted in 2013

Don Schaly (October 10, 1937 – March 9, 2005) was an American baseball coach. He was the baseball coach at Marietta College in Ohio for 40 years, from 1964 to 2003.

Schaly, a native of Ellwood City, Pennsylvania, retired following the 2003 season after 40 years at the helm of the Marietta baseball program. On March 9, 2005, he died of cancer in Venice, Florida.

== Head coaching record ==
| Year | Record |
|---|---|
| 1964 | 14–4 |
| 1965 | 21–4 |
| 1966 | 10–9 |
| 1967 | 16–5 |
| 1968 | 16–7 |
| 1969 | 12–8 |
| 1970 | 11–7 |
| 1971 | 27–7 |
| 1972 | 22–7 |
| 1973 | 31–6 |

| Year | Record |
|---|---|
| 1974 | 22–12 |
| 1975 | 44–6 |
| 1976 | 29–12 |
| 1977 | 36–13 |
| 1978 | 38–7 |
| 1979 | 40–6 |
| 1980 | 43–4 |
| 1981 | 59–5 * |
| 1982 | 53–11 |
| 1983 | 49–9 * |

| Year | Record |
|---|---|
| 1984 | 53–7 |
| 1985 | 46–11 |
| 1986 | 48–13 * |
| 1987 | 38–14 |
| 1988 | 44–9 |
| 1989 | 36–9 |
| 1990 | 39–7 |
| 1991 | 43–6 |
| 1992 | 43–8 |
| 1993 | 35–7 |

| Year | Record |
|---|---|
| 1994 | 39–4 |
| 1995 | 46–9 |
| 1996 | 43–13 |
| 1997 | 43–7 |
| 1998 | 40–10 |
| 1999 | 50–8 |
| 2000 | 44–7 |
| 2001 | 48–9 |
| 2002 | 41–9 |
| 2003 | 30–13 |

^{*} National Champs

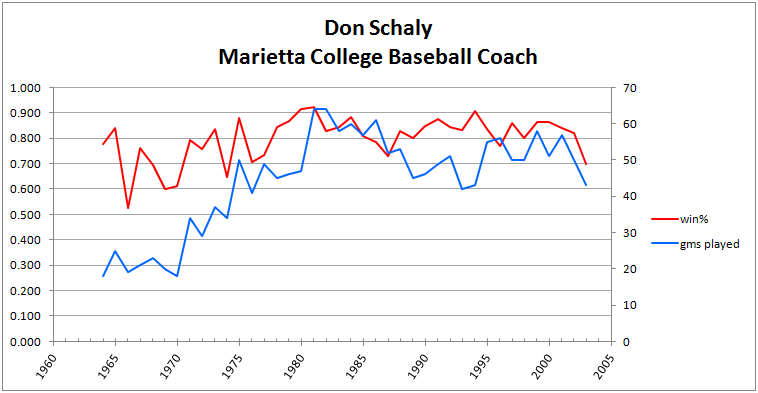

== See also ==
- List of college baseball career coaching wins leaders
