= New York State Baseball Hall of Fame =

Coordinates: 42.915317°N 73.813278°W

The New York State Baseball Hall of Fame is a hall of fame based in Ballston Lake, New York in the United States, founded in 2010 as an achievement award for baseball in the state.

== History ==
The group was founded by its current executive director, Rene LeRoux, originally to include Upstate New York members, and later expanded to include the entire state in 2012. The New York State Baseball Hall of Fame inducts people on every level of the game of baseball, including Major League Baseball (MLB) players, managers, broadcasters, writers, college baseball players and coaches, high school coaches, umpires, support personnel, team owners, general managers and Little League Baseball teams such as the 2016 Little League World Series winners from Maine-Endwell, New York, whose undefeated (24–0) team defeated South Korea in the 2016 Little League World Series.

The Hall of Fame inducts members based on a "body of work" formula, based on a total of years and contributions to the game. A board of advisors offers advice on the nominated inductees. At present, the New York State Baseball Hall of Fame has administration located in Ballston Lake, near the state capital of Albany. Plans are currently under review for construction of a year-round facility.

In 2016 the New York State Baseball Hall of Fame inducted the following former MLB players:

- Johnny Podres
- John Cerutti ˈ
- Ralph Branca
- Ed Kranepool
- Frank Viola
- Lou Whitaker
- Dave Lemanczyk
- John Doherty
- Willie Randolph
- Ken Singleton
- Lee Mazzilli
- Dennis Leonard
- Craig Biggio
- John Franco
- Jim Mecir
- David Palmer
- Ron Guidry
- John Antonelli
- Joe Altobelli
- Ron Darling
- Keith Hernandez
- Thurman Munson
- Bobby Murcer
- Ron Swoboda

Former New York State Governor Mario Cuomo was given a special induction in 2012. Cuomo was signed by Branch Rickey to play for the Pittsburgh Pirates, but an injury prematurely ended his baseball career. As Governor, Cuomo helped in the funding and building of many minor league baseball ballparks in the state. Cuomo was signed to a larger bonus than that of his friend, future Hall of Fame inductee Mickey Mantle.

== Awards ==
The NYS Baseball Hall of Fame each year presents the Johnny Podres Lifetime Achievement Award, the Johnny Evers Community Award, and the John Cerutti Sportsmanship Award. Past winners of the Podres Award are: 2016 Willie Randolph, 2015 Ken Singleton, 2014 Vin Scully, 2013 Ralph Branca.

Each year the Hall of Fame's induction celebration is held on the second Sunday in November following the completion of the World Series, in Troy, New York. The evening includes induction speeches and a dinner. The YES Network filmed interviews with inductees in 2015.
