= Bob Bennett (baseball) =

American college baseball coach (1933–2020)

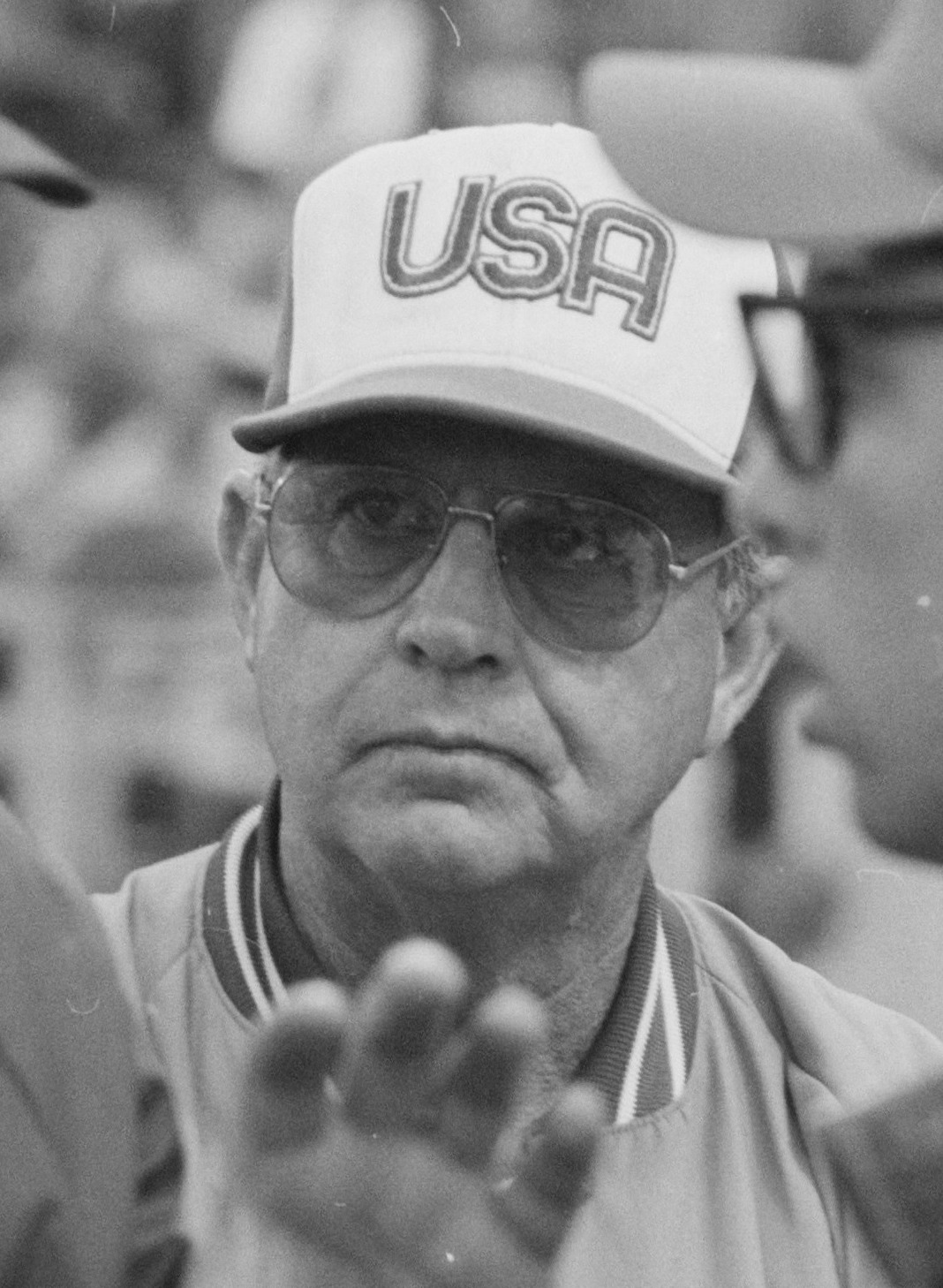
- Bennett at the 1986 Amateur World Series

Biographical details
- Born: June 22, 1933; Atwood, Oklahoma, U.S.
- Died: May 31, 2020 (aged 86); Fresno, California, U.S.

Coaching career (HC unless noted)
- 1956–1957: Kingsburg HS (CA)
- 1958–1966: Bullard HS (CA)
- 1967: Fresno State (interim HC)
- 1970–2002: Fresno State

Head coaching record
- Overall: 1,302–759–4 (.631)

Bobby Gene Bennett (June 22, 1933 – May 31, 2020) was an American college baseball coach who was head coach at Fresno State from 1970 to 2002.

== Biography ==
Born in Atwood, Oklahoma, Bennett attended Roosevelt High School in Fresno, California and graduated in 1951. In college, Bob caught for Fresno State, setting a school record for fielding in 1953 by going 224 chances without an error. Bennett began his coaching career in 1956 after graduating college with a degree in physical education. He was 41–19 from 1956 to 1957 at Kingsburg High School. He then spent 11 seasons coaching Bullard High School.

Bennett took a break from Bullard in 1967 to coach Fresno State when Pete Beiden took a sabbatical; the team went 38–10. When Beiden retired after 1969, Bennett became head coach, a job he held until his retirement in 2002. He would go 1,302–759–4 to finish 7th in NCAA Division I history in career victories; he only had two losing seasons in his career. He won 14 Conference Coach of the Year honors and was named NCAA Coach of the Year in 1988 by The Sporting News.

Bennett coached for Team USA in 1977 and 1979 and managed the team in the 1983 Intercontinental Cup (when they won a silver medal) and 1986 Amateur World Series.

Bennett took Fresno State to the 1988 College World Series and 1991 College World Series.

He helped develop Dick Ruthven, Ron Johnson, Terry Pendleton, Eric Fox, Mark Gardner, Tom Goodwin, Steve Hosey, Bobby Jones, Todd Johnson, Jeff Weaver, Dan Gladden, Adam Pettyjohn and Dennis Springer among other major leaguers.

In May 2001, Bennett announced his intention to retire following the 2002 season. Bennett retired with a 1,302–759–4 win–loss record at Fresno State. His #26 was the first number ever retired by Fresno State. He was once president of the American Baseball Coaches Association as well. He was inducted into the Fresno County Athletic Hall of Fame (1990), the ABCA Hall of Fame, and College Baseball Hall of Fame (2010).

Bennett continued in his retirement to coach players, lead instructional videos and practice as well as write literature related to baseball techniques and methods. Bennett was a poet and published a multitude of books over the years. Bennett continued to lead young players, was a motivational speaker and provided ongoing consultation to baseball coaches and players from the High School levels up to the Major Leagues.

His #26 was the first number retired at Fresno State and in 2016, the school renamed its baseball stadium "Bob Bennett Stadium at Pete Beiden Field."

He died on May 31, 2020, at the age of 86.

== See also ==
- List of college baseball career coaching wins leaders
