= 2011 NCAA Division II baseball tournament =

- Season: 2011
- Teams: 8
- Finals site: USA Baseball National Training Complex; Cary, NC
- Champions: West Florida (1st title)
- Runner-up: Winona State
- Winning coach: Mike Jeffcoat (1st title)
- Attendance: 19,568

The 2011 NCAA Division II baseball tournament was the postseason tournament hosted by the NCAA to determine the national champion of baseball among its Division II colleges and universities at the end of the 2011 NCAA Division II baseball season.

The final, eight-team double-elimination tournament was played at USA Baseball National Training Complex in Cary, NC.

West Florida defeated Winona State, 12–2, in the championship game, claiming the Argonauts' first Division II national title. There were 1,223 fans in attendance.

== Regionals ==
The field of 48 teams is broken down into six 6-team Brackets, one 4-team bracket and one 8-team bracket. The Regional round is a double elimination format. The top team in each bracket advanced to the 2011 NCAA Division II baseball tournament.

=== Atlantic Region ===
- Lancaster, PA

May 19–23

First round
1	Millersville	3
6	Concord	1
3	Seton Hall	5
4	East Stroudsburg	6
2	Mercyhurst	7
5	Winston-Salem St.	2

Second round
1	Millersville	5
3	Seton Hall	3
2	Mercyhurst	4
4	East Stroudsburg	1
6	Concord	11
5	Winston-Salem St.	3

Third round
1	Millersville	8
2	Mercyhurst	5
4	Easy Stroudsburg	17
6	Concord	3

Semifinals
2	Mercyhurst	4
4	East Stroudsburg	2

Final
1	Millersville	14	x
2	Mercyhurst	3	x

=== Central Region ===
- St. Cloud, MN

May 19–24

First round
1	St. Cloud St.	7
6	Augustana (SD)	1
3	Minnesota-Mankato	3
4	Nebraska-Kearney	5
2	Mesa St.	1
5	Winona St.	5

Second round
1	St. Cloud St.	1
3	Minnesota-Mankato	3
6	Augustana (SD)	3
2	Mesa St.	4
5	Winona St.	4
4	Nebraska-Kearney	10
5	Winona St.	7
1	St. Cloud St.	6

Third round
3	Minnesota-Mankato	4
2	Mesa St.	7
4	Nebraska-Kearney	0
5	Winona St.	2

Semifinals
2	Mesa St.	3
4	Nebraska-Kearney	4

Final
4	Nebraska-Kearney	1
5	Winona St.	3

=== East Region ===
- Rindge, NH

May 19–22

First round
1	Adelphi	2
6	Dowling	0
3	Wilmington (DE)	1
4	Southern Conn. St.	2
2	Franklin Pierce	4
5	UMass-Lowell	3

Second round
1	Adelphi	6
3	Wilmington (DE)	5
2	Franklin Pierce	2
4	Southern Conn. St.	9
6	Dowling	1
5	UMass-Lowell	3

Third round
1	Adelphi	7
4	Southern Conn. St.	1
2	Franklin Pierce	3
5	UMass-Lowell	0

Semifinals
4	Southern Conn. St.	3
2	Franklin Pierce	0

Final
1	Adelphi	1	1
4	Southern Conn. St.	9	2

=== Midwest Region ===
- Normal, IL

May 19–22

First round
1	Grand Valley St.	4
6	Wayne St. (MI)	2
3	Northern Kentucky	1
4	Quincy	0
2	Southern Indiana	0
5	Missouri S&T	2

Second round
1	Grand Valley St.	8
4	Quincy	4
5	Missouri S&T	2
3	Northern Kentucky	3
6	Wayne St. (MI)	5
2	Southern Indiana	3

Third round
1	Grand Valley St.	9
3	Northern Kentucky	0
5	Missouri S&T	2
6	Wayne St. (MI)	4

Semifinals
3	Northern Kentucky	2
6	Wayne St. (MI)	4

Final
1	Grand Valley St.	13	x
6	Wayne St. (MI)	5	x

=== South Region ===
- Pensacola, FL

May 19–23

Upper round 1	Upper round 2	Upper final	Final
1	West Florida	10
8	Stillman	1
1	West Florida	9
4	Barry	2
4	Barry	6
5	Nova Southeastern	0
1	West Florida	6
7	North Alabama	1
3	Harding	4
6	Tampa	1
3	Harding	4
7	North Alabama	8
2	Southern Arkansas	3
7	North Alabama	8	1	West Florida	1	3
4	Barry	3	4
Lower round 1	Lower round 2	Lower round 3	Lower final
3	Harding	4
8	Stillman	3	5	Nova Southeastern	5	7	North Alabama	5
5	Nova Southeastern	12	5	Nova Southeastern	4	4	Barry	10
4	Barry	5
4	Barry	5
2	Southern Arkansas	3	6	Tampa	2
6	Tampa	4

=== Southeast Region ===
- Mount Olive, NC

May 19–22

First round
1	Mount Olive	6
6	Wingate	0
2	Francis Marion	1
5	Catawba	2
3	UNC Pembroke	6
4	Columbus St.	0

Second round
1	Mount Olive	6
4	Columbus St.	2
5	Catawba	3
3	UNC Pembroke	5
6	Wingate	1
2	Francis Marion	6

Third round
1	Mount Olive	7
3	UNC Pembroke	3
5	Catawba	7
2	Francis Marion	9

Semifinals
3	UNC Pembroke	4
2	Francis Marion	5

Final
1	Mount Olive	7	2
2	Francis Marion	9	1

=== South Central Region ===
- San Antonio, TX

May 19–22

First round
1	St. Mary's (TX)	6
6	Incarnate Word	5
3	Emporia St.	1
2	SE Oklahoma St.	2
2	Central Missouri	3
5	Tarleton St.	2

Second round
1	St. Mary's (TX)	3
4	SE Oklahoma St.	5
6	Incarnate Word	8
5	Tarleton St.	4
2	Central Missouri	8
3	Emporia St.	1
1	St. Mary's (TX)	9
3	Emporia St.	1

Third round
4	SE Oklahoma St.	2
6	Incarnate Word	5
2	Central Missouri	5
1	St. Mary's (TX)	2

Final
6	Incarnate Word	0	x
2	Central Missouri	7	x

=== West Region ===
- La Jolla, CA

May 19–22

First round
1	UC San Diego	0
4	Sonoma State	4
3	Western Oregon	4
2	Cal Poly Pomona	10
UC San Diego	6
Western Oregon	3
Loser's bracket

Semi-finals
Sonoma State	10
Cal Poly Pomona	2
Cal Poly Pomona	6
UC San Diego	5

Finals
Sonoma State	4	8
Cal Poly Pomona	5	5

== College World Series ==
=== Bracket 1 ===
School	Conference	Record (Conference)	Head coach	CWS Appearances	CWS Best Finish
University of Central Missouri	Mid-America Intercollegiate Athletics Association	52-8 (37–7)	Tom Myers	15 (last:2010)	1st
Millersville University of Pennsylvania	Pennsylvania State Athletic Conference	43-10 (19–5)	Jon Shehan	1 (last:1998)	5th
Mount Olive College	Conference Carolinas	45-8 (16–4)	Carl Lancaster	1 (last:2008)	1st
Winona State University	Northern Sun Intercollegiate Conference	39-17 (25–9)	Kyle Poock	0 (last:none)	none

=== Bracket 2 ===
School	Conference	Record (Conference)	Head coach	CWS Appearances	CWS Best Finish
Grand Valley State University	Great Lakes Intercollegiate Athletic Conference	52-3 (34–1)	Steve Lyon	4 (last:2009)	2nd
Sonoma State University	California Collegiate Athletic Association	36-20 (24–16)	John Goelz	1 (last:2008)	3rd
Southern Connecticut State University	Northeast-10 Conference	43-7-1 (21–4–1)	Tim Shea	1 (last:2005)	7th
University of West Florida	Gulf South Conference	48-9 (17–3)	Mike Jeffcoat	0 (last:none)	none

=== 2011 College World Series Bracket ===
The teams in the CWS are divided into two pools of four, with each pool playing a double-elimination format. The winners of the two pools meet in the finals.

First Round
Winona State	4
Central Missouri	3
Mount Olive	3
Millersville	1
Central Missouri	0
Millersville	1
Sonoma State	7
Grand Valley St.	6
West Florida	13
So. Connecticut St.	0
Grand Valley St.	6
So. Connecticut St.	8

Second Round
Winona State	9
Mount Olive	3
Mount Olive	5
Millersville	2
Sonoma State	4
West Florida	5
Sonoma State	4
So. Connecticut St.	6

Semifinals
Winona State	7	x
So. Connecticut St.	5	x
West Florida	5	x
Mount Olive	3	x

Championship
Winona State	2
West Florida	12

=== Game Results ===
Game	Winner	Score	Loser	Notes
May 28
Game 1	Winona State University	4-3	University of Central Missouri	
Game 2	Mount Olive College	3-1	Millersville University of Pennsylvania	
May 29
Game 3	Sonoma State University	7-6	Grand Valley State University	
Game 4	University of West Florida	13-0	Southern Connecticut State University	
May 30
Game 5	Millersville University of Pennsylvania	1-0	University of Central Missouri	Central Missouri eliminated
Game 6	Winona State University	9-3	Mount Olive College	
May 31
Game 7	Southern Connecticut State University	8-6	Grand Valley State University	Grand Valley eliminated
Game 8	University of West Florida	5-4	Sonoma State University	
June 1
Game 9	Mount Olive College	5-2	Millersville University of Pennsylvania	Millersville eliminated
Game 10	Southern Connecticut State University	6-4	Sonoma State University	Sonoma St. eliminated
June 2
Game 11	University of West Florida	5-3	Mount Olive College	Mount Olive eliminated
Game 12	Winona State University	7-5	Southern Connecticut State University	S. Conn eliminated
June 4
Game 13	University of West Florida	12-2	Winona State University	West Florida wins CWS

== See also ==
- 2011 NCAA Division I baseball tournament
- 2011 NCAA Division III baseball tournament
