= Ryan Overland =

American college baseball coach (born 1985)

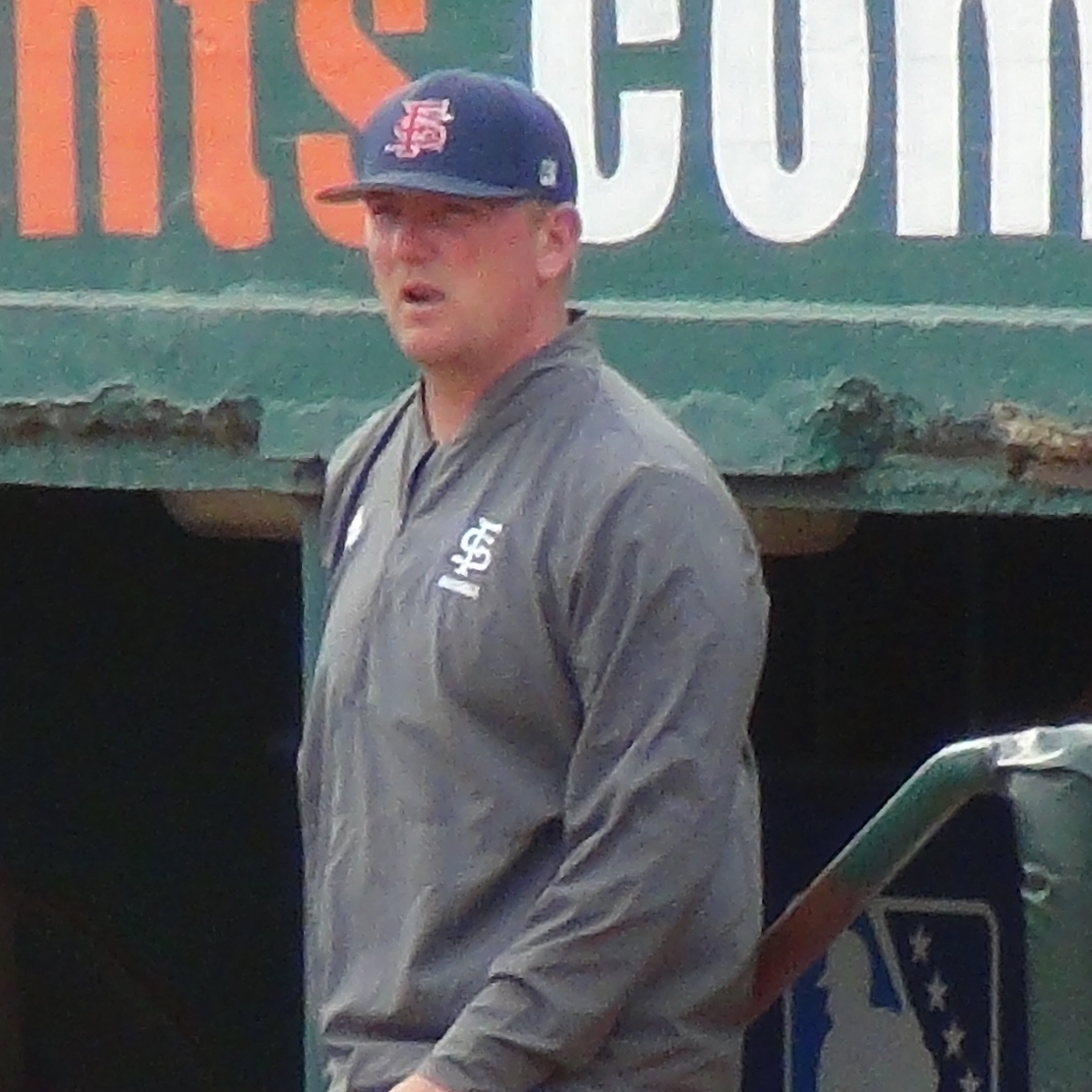
- Overland in 2025.

Current position
- Title: Head coach
- Team: Fresno State
- Conference: Pac-12
- Record: 108–123–1 (.468)

Biographical details
- Born: October 25, 1985 (age 41); Atascadero, California, U.S.

Playing career
- 2005–2008: Fresno State
- Position: Catcher

Coaching career (HC unless noted)
- 2009–2010: South Dakota State (GA)
- 2011: Fresno State (intern)
- 2012: Fresno State (volunteer asst.)
- 2013–2022: Fresno State (asst.)
- 2023–present: Fresno State

Head coaching record
- Overall: 108–123–1 (.468)
- Tournaments: NCAA: 0–4

Accomplishments and honors

Championships
- As player: College World Series (2008); As coach: 2 Mountain West tournament (2024, 2025)

Ryan Edward Overland (born October 25, 1985) is an American college baseball coach and former catcher, who is the head baseball coach at California State University, Fresno (Fresno State), a position he has held since 2023. He played college baseball at Fresno State from 2005 to 2008.

As a college baseball player, Overland was a catcher under head coach Mike Batesole and helped Fresno State win the 2008 College World Series during his senior year. After graduating from Fresno State, Overland began his coaching career as a graduate assistant at South Dakota State from 2009 to 2010. He then spent over a decade on Batesole's Fresno State coaching staff, starting as an intern in 2011, volunteer assistant in 2012, and assistant coach from 2013 to 2022.

Shortly before the 2023 season, Batesole retired, resulting in Overland being named interim head coach that year. Overland led Fresno State to a 30–27 record, and Fresno State promoted him to a multi-year contract.

== Early life and education ==
Overland was born in Atascadero, California, one of two children of Dale and Jean Overland, who both worked as teachers. At Atascadero High School, Overland graduated in 2004 as a two-sport athlete, with two letters in basketball as a guard and three letters in baseball as pitcher and catcher. In 2003 and 2004, Overland earned first-team all-league honors and was part of league championship baseball teams, as a junior and senior at Atascadero High.

After high school, Overland attended California State University, Fresno, where he played at catcher for Fresno State Bulldogs baseball from 2005 to 2008 under head coach Mike Batesole. As a freshman in 2005, Overland started all 30 Western Athletic Conference games at catcher, with a .992 fielding percentage and .265 batting average. Overland later played primarily in backup roles, with five starts in 23 games in 2006 and 19 starts in 45 games in 2007. He had a .267 batting average in 2006 and .253 batting average in 2007.

As a senior in 2008, Overland had a breakthrough season with career highs in games played (65), starts (41), and batting average (.291), in a season where Fresno State had an unexpected run to the 2008 College World Series national championship.

Overland completed his bachelor's degree in communication studies at Fresno State in 2008 and master's degree in health, physical education, and recreation at South Dakota State University in 2010.

== Coaching career ==
=== South Dakota State ===
From 2009 to 2010, Overland was a graduate assistant at South Dakota State specializing in hitting and catching; South Dakota State won the regular season Summit League championship in 2010.

=== Fresno State ===
==== Assistant coach (2011–2022) ====
In 2011, Overland was hired as a coaching intern at his alma mater, California State University, Fresno (Fresno State), reuniting with Mike Batesole. In 2012, he became a volunteer assistant coach.

In the fall of 2012, Overland took his first full-time assistant coaching job at the University of Nevada, Reno, but Overland returned to Fresno State the following spring for the 2013 baseball season and remained in the job for ten seasons with Fresno State, winning the Mountain West Conference regular season title in 2016 and conference tournament in 2019. In his early years as a Fresno State assistant coach, Overland was the third base coach and specialized in coaching catchers. Beginning in 2018, Overland was the pitching coach for Fresno State.

==== Head coach (2023–present) ====
On January 15, 2023, Overland was named the interim head coach of the Fresno State Bulldogs about two weeks after Batesole retired. Overland led Fresno State to a 30–27 record, including 16–14 and fourth place in Mountain West Conference standings, a three-win improvement from Batesole's final season in 2022. Fresno State elevated Overland from interim status on May 31, 2023, signing him to a long-term contract.

In 2024, his first season under his new contract, Overland led Fresno State to a 33–29 (16–14 MW) record, Mountain West Tournament championship, and NCAA Tournament appearance. In the Mountain West Tournament, Fresno State won four straight elimination games, including the final two against rival San Jose State.

Improving to second place in Mountain West standings at 18–12, Fresno State won a second straight Mountain West Tournament title in 2025.

In 2026, the Bulldogs regressed in their final season in the Mountain West, finishing with a 14–38–1 record and ninth in the conference.

== Head coaching record ==
Record table
Season	Team	Overall	Conference	Standing	Postseason
Fresno State Bulldogs (Mountain West Conference) (2023–2026)
2023	Fresno State	30–27	16–14	4th	
2024	Fresno State	33–29	16–14	T–3rd	NCAA Regional
2025	Fresno State	31–29	18–12	2nd	NCAA Regional
2026	Fresno State	14–38–1	3–20–1	9th	
Fresno State:		108–123–1 (.468)	53–60–1 (.469)		
Total:		108–123–1 (.468)			
National champion Postseason invitational champion Conference regular season champion Conference regular season and conference tournament champion Division regular season champion Division regular season and conference tournament champion Conference tournament champion
