= O'Koyea Dickson =

American baseball player (born 1990)

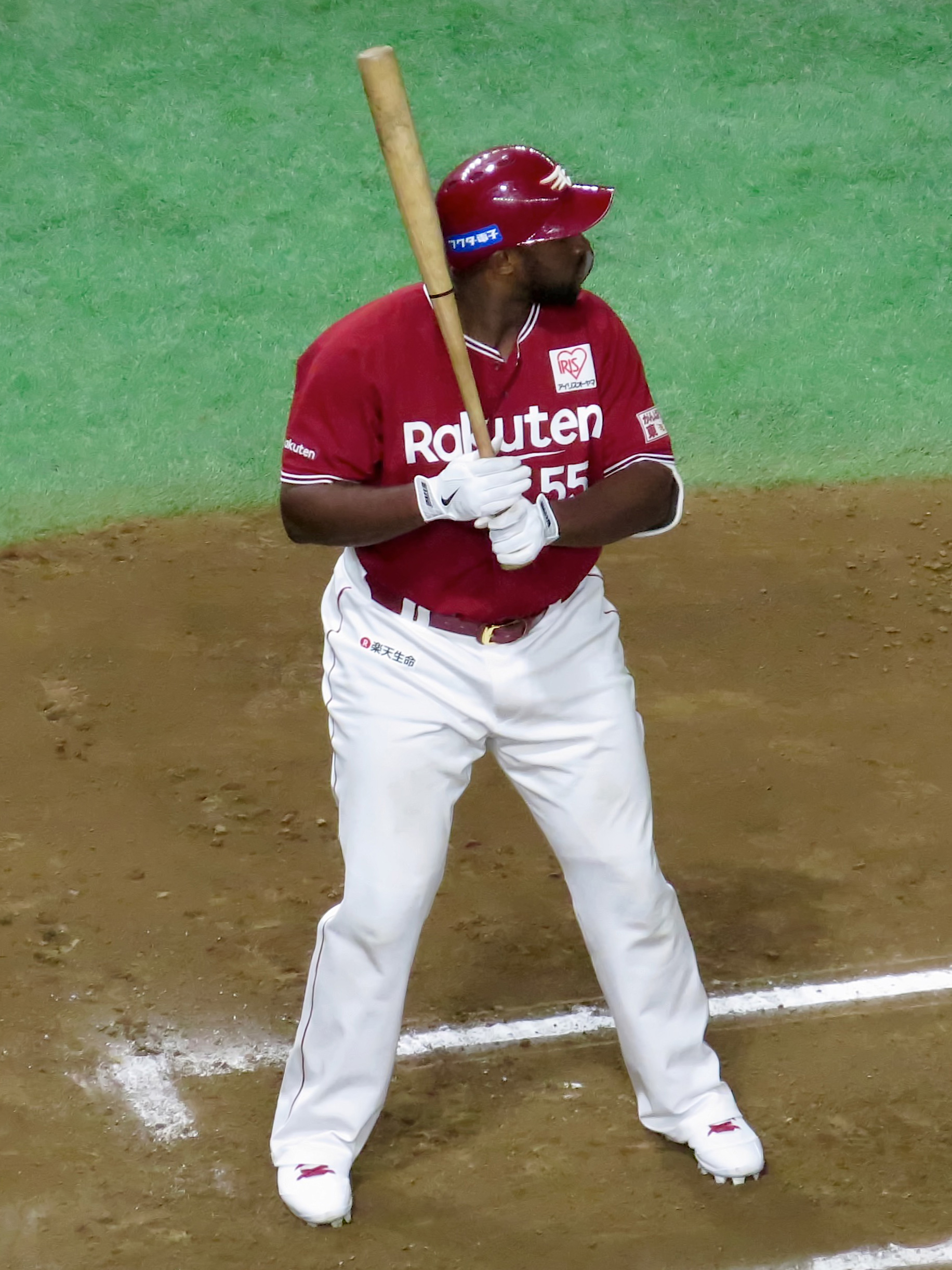
- Dickson with the Tohoku Rakuten Golden Eagles
- Outfielder
- Born: February 9, 1990 (age 36); San Francisco, California, U.S.
- Batted: Right Threw: Right

Professional debut
- MLB: September 2, 2017, for the Los Angeles Dodgers
- NPB: May 24, 2018, for the Tohoku Rakuten Golden Eagles

Last appearance
- MLB: September 26, 2017, for the Los Angeles Dodgers
- NPB: October 6, 2018, for the Tohoku Rakuten Golden Eagles

MLB statistics
- Batting average: .143
- Home runs: 0
- Runs batted in: 0

NPB statistics
- Batting average: .175
- Home runs: 1
- Runs batted in: 3
- Stats at Baseball Reference

Teams
- Los Angeles Dodgers (2017); Tohoku Rakuten Golden Eagles (2018)

O'Koyea Dickson (born February 9, 1990) is an American former professional baseball outfielder. He played in Major League Baseball (MLB) for the Los Angeles Dodgers during the 2017 season, and the Tohoku Rakuten Golden Eagles of Nippon Professional Baseball (NPB) in 2018.

== Amateur career ==
Dickson graduated from George Washington High School in San Francisco, California, where he was the Player of the Year in 2008. As a sophomore at George Washington High, playing in the city championship game, he became the first high school player to hit a home run in AT&T Park. He hit a ground rule double his next at-bat.

After graduating from George Washington, Dickson attended College of San Mateo, where he was an All-American as a sophomore and helped lead his team to consecutive league titles. For his junior year, he transferred to Sonoma State University. He led the California Collegiate Athletic Association in runs scored and helped take his team to the 2011 NCAA Division II baseball tournament.

== Professional career ==
=== Los Angeles Dodgers ===
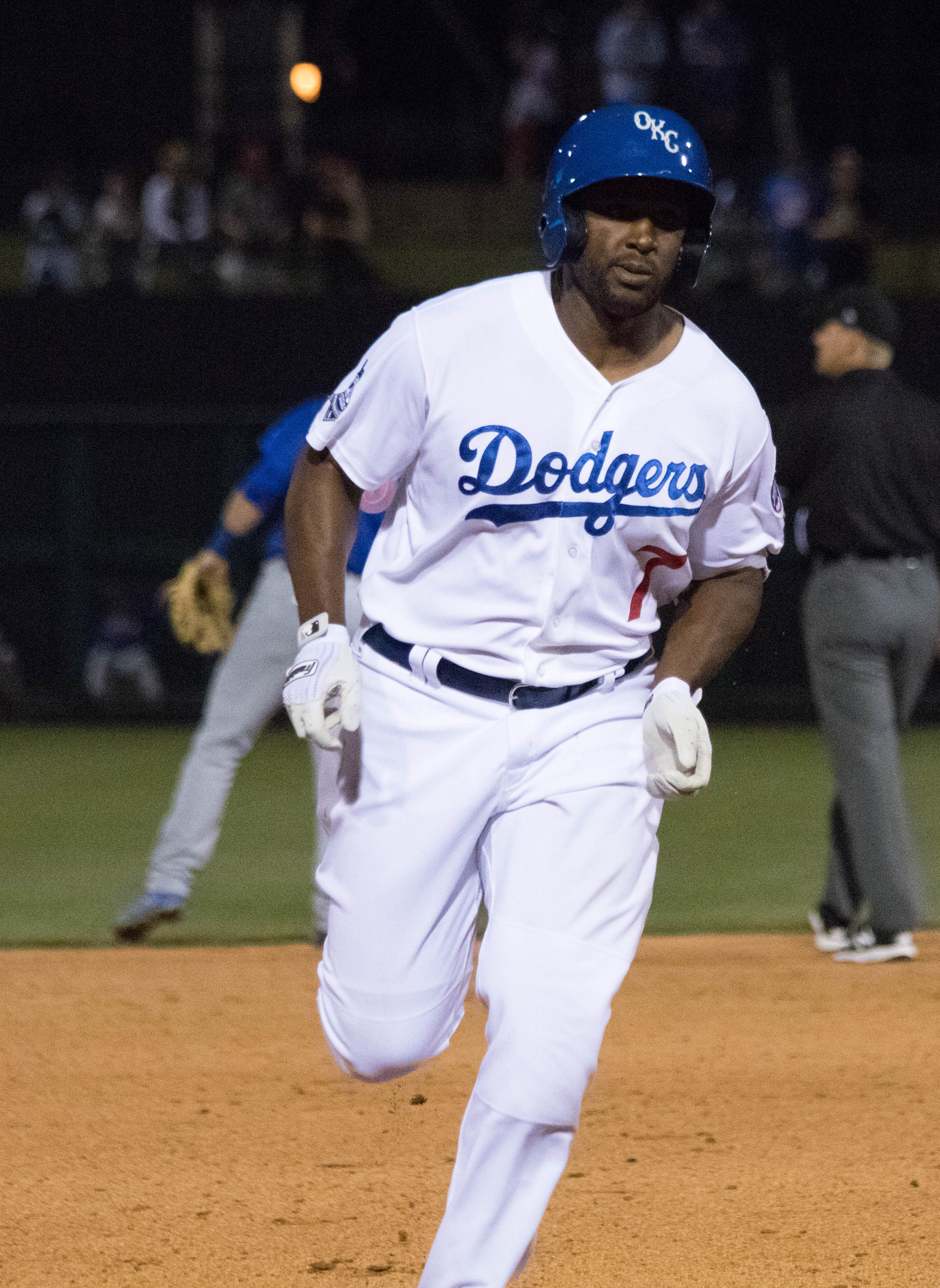
Dickson with the Oklahoma City Dodgers

The Los Angeles Dodgers selected Dickson in the 12th round of the 2011 MLB draft. He spent 2011 with the Ogden Raptors and 2012 with the Great Lakes Loons. He hit .280 with 15 homers and 88 RBI in 2013 with the Rancho Cucamonga Quakes of the California League. In 2014, he played with the Double-A Chattanooga Lookouts of the Southern League, where he hit .269 with 17 homers and 73 RBI and scored an invite to spring training for 2015. He was assigned to the Triple-A Oklahoma City Dodgers. He appeared in 117 games and hit .262 with 12 homers and 50 RBI. In 2016, he remained with Oklahoma City and hit .328 with 18 homers and 64 RBIs in 101 games. In 2017, he played in 116 games and hit .246 with 24 homers and 76 RBI for Oklahoma City.

The Dodgers promoted Dickson to the major leagues for the first time on September 1, 2017. He made his major league debut the following day as the starting leftfielder and was hitless in three at-bats with one walk. He appeared in a total of seven games and had one hit in seven at-bats for the Dodgers. His first major league hit was a single to centerfield off of Madison Bumgarner of the San Francisco Giants on September 23, 2017. He suffered a shoulder injury late in the month and was placed on the disabled list. Dickson was outrighted to the minors and removed from the 40-man roster on November 6, 2017. He elected free agency the same day.

=== Tohoku Rakuten Golden Eagles ===
On December 26, 2017, Dickson signed a contract with the Tohoku Rakuten Golden Eagles of Nippon Professional Baseball (NPB). He became a free agent following the 2018 season.

=== Washington Nationals ===
On February 15, 2019, Dickson signed a minor league contract with the Washington Nationals. He made three appearances for the Double-A Harrisburg Senators, he went 0-for-7 with two walks. Dickson was released by the Nationals organization on May 14.

=== Sugar Land Skeeters ===
On June 3, 2019, Dickson signed with the Sugar Land Skeeters of the Atlantic League of Professional Baseball. Dickson made 10 appearances for the Sugar Land, going 5-for-27 (.185) with one RBI.

=== Generales de Durango ===
On June 25, 2019, Dickson's contract was purchased by the Generales de Durango of the Mexican League. He made 27 appearances for Durango, hitting .327/.392/.598 with five home runs and 19 RBI. Dickson was released by the Generales on July 29.

=== Vallejo Admirals ===
On August 3, 2019, Dickson signed with the Vallejo Admirals of the Pacific Association. In 17 appearances for Vallejo, Dickson batted .355 with 11 home runs, 28 RBI, and one stolen base.

== Coaching career ==
Dickson was named hitting coach of the High–A Great Lakes Loons for the 2023 season. He reprised his role for the 2024 season.
