= Bill Holowaty =

American baseball coach

Biographical details
- Born: Little Falls, New York, U.S.

Coaching career (HC unless noted)
- 1967–2012: Eastern Connecticut State
- 1973: Chatham A's (asst.)

Head coaching record
- Overall: 1404–525–7 (.727)

Accomplishments and honors

Championships
- 4x College World Series (1982, 1990, 1998, 2002)

Awards
- National Coach-of-the-Year 4x Regional Coach-of-the-Year 14x National championship 4x
- College Baseball Hall of Fame; Inducted in 2015

Bill Holowaty is an American retired college baseball coach who coached the Eastern Connecticut State University baseball team for 45 years (1967–2012). He is the most successful coach in the history of New England intercollegiate athletics and led Eastern Connecticut State's baseball team to four Division III College World Series victories.

== Coaching career ==
Holowaty enjoyed a successful coaching career. He took the baseball team to the postseason 39 out of 45 times, while 14 of those teams advanced to the Division III College World Series. In total, he won 1,404 out of 1,936 games (72.5%). He has the third most wins by any Division III coach all time and has the thirteenth highest winning percentage by a Division III coach all-time. In 1973, he was assistant coach for the Chatham A's of the Cape Cod Baseball League.

== See also ==
- List of college baseball career coaching wins leaders
