= Fresno State Bulldogs baseball =

- 2026 Fresno State Bulldogs baseball team
- Founded: 1922
- University: California State University, Fresno
- Head coach: Ryan Overland (4th season)
- Conference: Pac-12
- Location: Fresno, California
- Home stadium: Pete Beiden Field at Bob Bennett Stadium (capacity: 5,422)
- Nickname: Bulldogs
- Colors: Cardinal red and blue

College World Series champions
- 2008

College World Series appearances
- 1959, 1988, 1991, 2008

NCAA regional champions
- 1988, 1991, 2008

NCAA tournament appearances
- 1954, 1955, 1959, 1961, 1962, 1966, 1967, 1977, 1979, 1980, 1981, 1982, 1983, 1984, 1985, 1988, 1989, 1990, 1991, 1992, 1993, 1994, 1995, 1996, 1997, 2000, 2001, 2006, 2007, 2008, 2009, 2011, 2012, 2019, 2024, 2025

Conference tournament champions
- 1993, 1995, 2006, 2007, 2008, 2009, 2011, 2012, 2019, 2024, 2025

Conference regular season champions
- 1988, 2006, 2007, 2008, 2011, 2016, 2019

The Fresno State Bulldogs baseball team represents California State University, Fresno in NCAA Division I college baseball and are members of the Pac-12 Conference (Pac-12). The Bulldogs play their home games on campus at Pete Beiden Field, and they are currently coached by Ryan Overland.

== History ==
Established in 1922, the Fresno State baseball program has experienced numerous successes over the decades. A pinnacle moment came in 2008 when the Bulldogs clinched the NCAA Division I College World Series title. Entering the tournament as a fourth seed, they achieved a series of upsets, culminating in a championship victory over Georgia. This win was particularly remarkable, as it marked the first time a fourth seed secured the national title.

The Bulldogs have had only four full-time coaches since 1948: Pete Beiden (1948-1967, 1968-1969), Bob Bennett (1970-2002), Mike Batesole (2003-2022), and Ryan Overland (2023-present).

Stadium

The team plays its home games at Pete Beiden Field at Bob Bennett Stadium, located on the university's campus in Fresno, California. Opened in 1966, the stadium has undergone several renovations to enhance the fan experience and player facilities. It has a seating capacity of 3,575 and features modern amenities, including electronic scoreboards and a natural grass playing surface.

== Fresno State in the NCAA Tournament ==
Fresno State's 30+ NCAA tournament appearances is good enough to rank in the top 10 all-time. To date, Fresno State has appeared in four NCAA Men's College World Series. In 1959, the Bulldogs, under head coach Pete Beiden, secured a third-place finish by winning games against Western Michigan and Arizona before being eliminated by Oklahoma State. In 1988 the Bulldogs, under head coach Bob Bennett, reached the CWS but were eliminated early losing to Stanford and Miami (FL) 10-3 and 8-4, respectively. In 1991, the Bulldogs returned to the CWS again under Bennett, and fared a little better beating #1 overall seed Florida State 8-4 in the opening game but ultimately dropping the next two games in succession to LSU (the eventual champion that year) and Florida, finishing the 91' season 42-23.

=== 2008 College World Series ===
Fresno State reached the height of its success in 2008, winning the national championship under the head coach Mike Batesole.

Prior to winning the 2008 tournament over the Georgia Bulldogs, Fresno State's only championship in a men's sport was in 1968, when the men's tennis team won the national championship held in Fort Worth, Texas; the school's only other national championship came in 1998, when the Lady Bulldogs softball team won that year's NCAA Women's College World Series.

The Bulldogs entered the Western Athletic Conference tournament at 33–27; they would likely not have made the NCAA tournament without winning the WAC tournament, which they did. They were placed as the #4 seed in their regional in the NCAA Tournament. Since only four teams play in each of the tournament's sixteen regionals, the placement was the equivalent of a team seeded #13 or lower in the NCAA basketball tournament. No #4 regional seed had ever previously advanced to the College World Series. By contrast, only one team seeded #13 or lower has made the Elite Eight of the men's basketball tournament, arguably equivalent to the eight-team College World Series.

The Bulldogs won a total of ten tournament games against six different teams ranked in the top twenty. They faced elimination six times, winning all six games. During the CWS, they competed against top teams like Rice, North Carolina, and Georgia, facing elimination three times and winning all three games. ESPN pointed out that if the NCAA baseball tournament was compared to the NCAA basketball tournament, Fresno State's run would be equivalent to a #13 seed beating a #4 seed in the first round, a #5 seed in the second round, a #1 seed in the Sweet Sixteen, a #2 seed in the Elite Eight, another #1 seed in the Final Four, and still another #2 seed for the championship. Right fielder Steve Detwiler drove in all six runs in the championship game, and third baseman Tommy Mendonca was named the Most Outstanding Player of the CWS. The Bulldogs' stellar underdog journey to the CWS Championship was nominated for an ESPY Award.

== Notable alumni ==
- Pat Doyle – Baseball coach.
- Doug Fister – starting pitcher for 10 seasons in MLB for six different teams from 2009 through 2018.
- Mark Gardner – Pitcher, 12-year MLB veteran drafted in 1989 by the Montreal Expos, Kansas City Royals, Florida Marlins and finished his career with the San Francisco Giants. Has been on the Giants coaching staff as their bullpen coach since 2003.
- Matt Garza – starting pitcher in MLB from 2006 through 2017; 2008 ALCS MVP with the Tampa Bay Rays.
- Dan Gladden – 11-year MLB outfielder who was with the Minnesota Twins for two World Series wins in 1987 and 1991.
- John Hoover – Set three career records and three Bulldogs single-season records, highlighted by his NCAA record of 42 career complete games and 19 complete games in a season, including 44 wins and 494 innings pitched in a career, and single-season marks of 18 wins and 205 strikeouts (Baltimore Orioles, first round, 25th pick, 1984 MLB draft).
- Bobby Jones – Pitcher, selected by the Mets with the 36th pick in the 1st round of the 1991 amateur draft.
- Aaron Judge – All-Star outfielder drafted by the New York Yankees in 2013, made his major league debut in 2016. 2017 American League Rookie of the Year, 2017 Home Run Derby Champion, broke Mark McGwire's MLB rookie home run record of 49, by hitting 52. American League single season home run leader passing Roger Maris’s mark of 61 with 62 in 2022.
- Terry Pendleton – 3B, former All-Star and World Series Champion with the Atlanta Braves. Currently the 3B coach for the Braves. Was a 3-time Gold Glover (1987, 1989, 1992) and 1-time Batting Champ (1991 as well as 1-time League MVP (1991.
- Dick Ruthven – Pitcher, drafted in 1973 by the Philadelphia Phillies he spent 13 years in MLB spending time with the Phillies, Atlanta Braves and Chicago Cubs. Was twice named an All-Star (1976, 1981) and won a World Series with the Phillies in 1980.
- Jeff Weaver – Pitcher, 2006 World Series champion (St. Louis Cardinals). Drafted by the Detroit Tigers in the first round of the 1998 amateur draft.
- Jimy Williams – 1999 American League Manager of the Year (Boston Red Sox), 1995 World Series champion (third-base coach, Atlanta Braves), and 2008 World Series champion (bench coach, Philadelphia Phillies).
- Austin Wynns - catcher for the San Francisco Giants
- Taylor Ward - Outfielder for the Los Angeles Angels, was teammates with Aaron Judge in 2013.

== See also ==
- List of NCAA Division I baseball programs
- 2008 Fresno State Bulldogs baseball team
