= William A. Cugno =

United States Army general (born 1948)

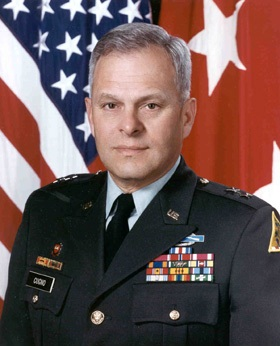
- MG William A. Cugno (official photo, April 2000)
- Born: April 4, 1948; Waterbury, CT
- Died: November 10, 2011 (aged 63); Naples, FL
- Military career
- Allegiance: United States
- Branch: United States Army
- Service years: 12 March 1968 – 1 May 2005
- Rank: Major General
- Commands: Connecticut National Guard; 85th Troop Command; 242d Engineer Battalion
- Conflicts: Vietnam War

Major General William Anthony Cugno was born April 4, 1948, in Waterbury, Connecticut. He was the son of Anthony and Marie Cugno of Harwich, Massachusetts. He graduated from Waterbury's Crosby High School in 1967. He earned a Bachelor of Arts degree in political science from Eastern Connecticut State University in Willimantic, Connecticut in 1984 and a master's degree in public administration from Shippensburg University, Shippensburg, Pennsylvania, in 1991.

General Cugno served as the adjutant general and commander of the Connecticut Army and Air National Guard from June 1999 until his retirement in April 2005. Prior to becoming the adjutant general, during his 38-year military career, he served in several command and staff positions. General Cugno was a combat veteran of Vietnam where he served as a platoon leader from August 1968 to 1969 with the 9th Infantry Division. He joined the Connecticut Army National Guardin 1970 and held several staff and company command positions to include the 1st Battalion, 192nd (coastal) Artillery; Headquarters and Headquarters Co., 242nd Engineer Battalion; 130th Public Affairs Detachment. Following his company commands, General Cugno served as the Connecticut National Guard's Recruiting and Retention Manager for eight years. He then served as the commander of the 242nd Combat Engineer Battalion. Upon graduation from the U.S. Army War College, General Cugno was assigned as the commander of the 85th Troop Command, a brigade-size command, and served until 1994 when he was named the State Director of Plans, Operations, and Military Support for the Connecticut Military Department. In 1996, he served as the chief of staff for the City of Waterbury and was responsible for the day-to-day operations of city government.

== Education ==
1984: Eastern Connecticut State University: BA in political science
1991: Shippensburg University: MPA in public administration
1991: Army War College

== Assignments ==
1. August 1968 – April 1969, Rifle Platoon Leader, Company D, 3rd Battalion, 47th Infantry, 9th Infantry Division, United States Army, Vietnam
2. April 1969 – January 1970, Assistant Confinement Officer, 58th Military Police Company, Third US Army, Fort Bragg, North Carolina
3. January 1970 – September 1970, United States Army Reserve Control Group, St. Louis, Missouri
4. September 1970 – December 1970, Platoon Leader, Battery B, 1st Battalion 192d Artillery (Coastal), Connecticut Army National Guard, East Windsor, Connecticut
5. December 1970 – May 1971, S4, Headquarters and Headquarters Battery, Connecticut Army National Guard, 1st Battalion, 192d Artillery (Coastal), Hartford, Connecticut
6. May 1971 – October 1971, Liaison Officer, Headquarters Detachment, Connecticut Army National Guard, Hartford, Connecticut
7. October 1971 – October 1975, S1, later Assistant S3, Headquarters Company, 242d Engineer Battalion, Connecticut Army National Guard, Stratford, Connecticut
8. November 1975 – October 1976, Commander, Headquarters Company, 242d Engineer Battalion, Connecticut Army National Guard, Westbrook, Connecticut
9. October 1976 – January 1979, S1, later S3, Headquarters Detachment, 192d Engineer Battalion, Connecticut Army National Guard, New London, Connecticut
10. January 1979 – November 1981, Commander, 130th Public Affairs Detachment, Connecticut Army National Guard, West Hartford, Connecticut
11. December 1981 – February 1982, Test Control Officer, Headquarters Detachment, Connecticut Army National Guard, Hartford, Connecticut
12. February 1982 – July 1982, Recruiting and Retention Officer, Headquarters Detachment, Connecticut Army National Guard, Hartford, Connecticut
13. July 1982 – February 1983, Training Officer, Headquarters Detachment, Connecticut Army National Guard, Hartford, Connecticut
14. February 1983 – August 1984, Supervisor Examiner, Headquarters Detachment, Connecticut Army National Guard, Hartford, Connecticut
15. August 1984 – September 1088, Recruiting and Retention Manager, Headquarters Detachment, Connecticut Army National Guard, Hartford, Connecticut
16. September 1988 – July 1990, Commander, 242d Engineer Battalion, Connecticut Army National Guard, Stratford, Connecticut
17. July 1990 – June 1991, Student, US Army War College, Carlisle Barracks, Pennsylvania
18. July 1991 – December 1991, Facility Management Officer, Headquarters Detachment, Connecticut Army National Guard, Hartford, Connecticut
19. December 1991 – April 1994, Commander, 85th Troop Command STARC, Connecticut Army National Guard, New London, Connecticut
20. May 1994 – March 1996, Director of Plans, Operations, Training and Military Support, Headquarters Detachment, Connecticut Army National Guard, Hartford, Connecticut
21. March 1996 – May 1997, The Retired Reserve, St. Louis, Missouri
22. May 1997 – May 1999, Assistant Adjutant General, Headquarters, State Area Command, Connecticut Army National Guard, Hartford, Connecticut
23. June 1999 – May 2005, Adjutant General, Headquarters, State Area Command, Connecticut Army National Guard, Hartford, Connecticut

== Awards and decorations ==
Combat Infantry Badge
Silver Star
Legion of Merit
Bronze Star
Meritorious Service Medal
Air Medal
Army Commendation Medal with three bronze oak leaf clusters
Army Reserve Components Achievement Medal with 1 silver oak leaf cluster
National Defense Service Medal with bronze service star
Vietnam Service Medal with three bronze service stars
Humanitarian Service Medal
Armed Forces Reserve Medal with 1 silver hourglass device
Army Service Ribbon
Vietnam Campaign Medal with 60 device
Vietnam Gallantry Cross with Palm
Vietnam Civil Actions Unit Citation

== Effective dates of promotion ==
Promotions
Insignia	Rank	Date
	Major General	March 31, 2000
	Brigadier General	September 30, 1997
	Colonel	March 20, 1991
	Lieutenant Colonel	August 29, 1984
	Major	February 15, 1978
	Captain	March 29, 1972
	First Lieutenant	March 12, 1969
	Second Lieutenant	March 12, 1968

== Investigation and retirement ==
The Department of Defense Inspector General investigated MG Cugno focusing on several e-mails with sexual content with a Chief Master Sergeant Kristine Shaw in March 2004. Shaw denied any relationship with Cugno claiming she was the victim of jealousy and gossip. Shaw was a personnel administrator with the Air National Guard and did acknowledge she did work for MG Cugno beyond her normal duties, including travelling with him.

In an interview, Shaw denied any close or improper relationship with Cugno. Both were married. "I think it's pretty nuts," she said. "I never felt like he wanted a relationship, or he implied a relationship. As a matter of fact he would yell at me as much as he yelled at everyone else." She said others in the National Guard have resented that she has worked closely with Cugno. "I'm not the only one with a direct line to him," she said, but all the others are men. "I am a female, and there are a lot of jealousies."

Shaw acknowledged sending at least one e-mail with suggestive language to Cugno, but she said it was a bogus, intentionally provocative message designed to expose someone within the state military who she thought was snooping into e-mails sent by her and a few others who were close to Cugno.

The Hartford Courant obtained a printout of one purported e-mail exchange between Kristine Shaw and Cugno, dated March 1, 2004. In it, Shaw purportedly wrote Cugno that "it will be important to be able to have enough time for at least 3 or 4 times," with later language in the brief message becoming more suggestive. The printout also included a reply sent to Shaw soon after her suggestive message. The two-word message - "I promise" - appeared to have come from Cugno's military e-mail account and bore an electronic signature indicating it had been sent over his Blackberry wireless communication device.

As a result of the investigation and publicity, MG Cugno submitted a request for retirement to Connecticut's Governor, M. Jodi Rell effective May 1, 2005.

== Later life and death ==
Cugno lived in Southington, Connecticut but relocated to Naples, Florida after retirement. He was divorced from his wife Carolyn. They had two daughters. Cugno died unexpectedly November 10, 2011.

Military offices
Preceded by David W. Gay	Connecticut Adjutant General; June 1, 1999 – May 1, 2005	Succeeded by Thaddeus J. Martin
