= Peebles Homestead =

Historic Revolutionary War Era Homestead

Coordinates: 40°04′10″N 77°28′29″W

The Peebles Homestead is located along Cramer Road in Shippensburg, Southampton Township, Cumberland County, Pennsylvania. The property was settled by the Alexander Peebles, Sr. family in the 1770’s when Alexander Peebles was granted a land warrant for 217 acres in 1773. In 1787 he was granted an additional parcel adjacent to the Cramer Road property which sits between current day Cramer Road and Goodhart Road. The Cramer Road property was surveyed in 1787.

== Architecture and construction ==
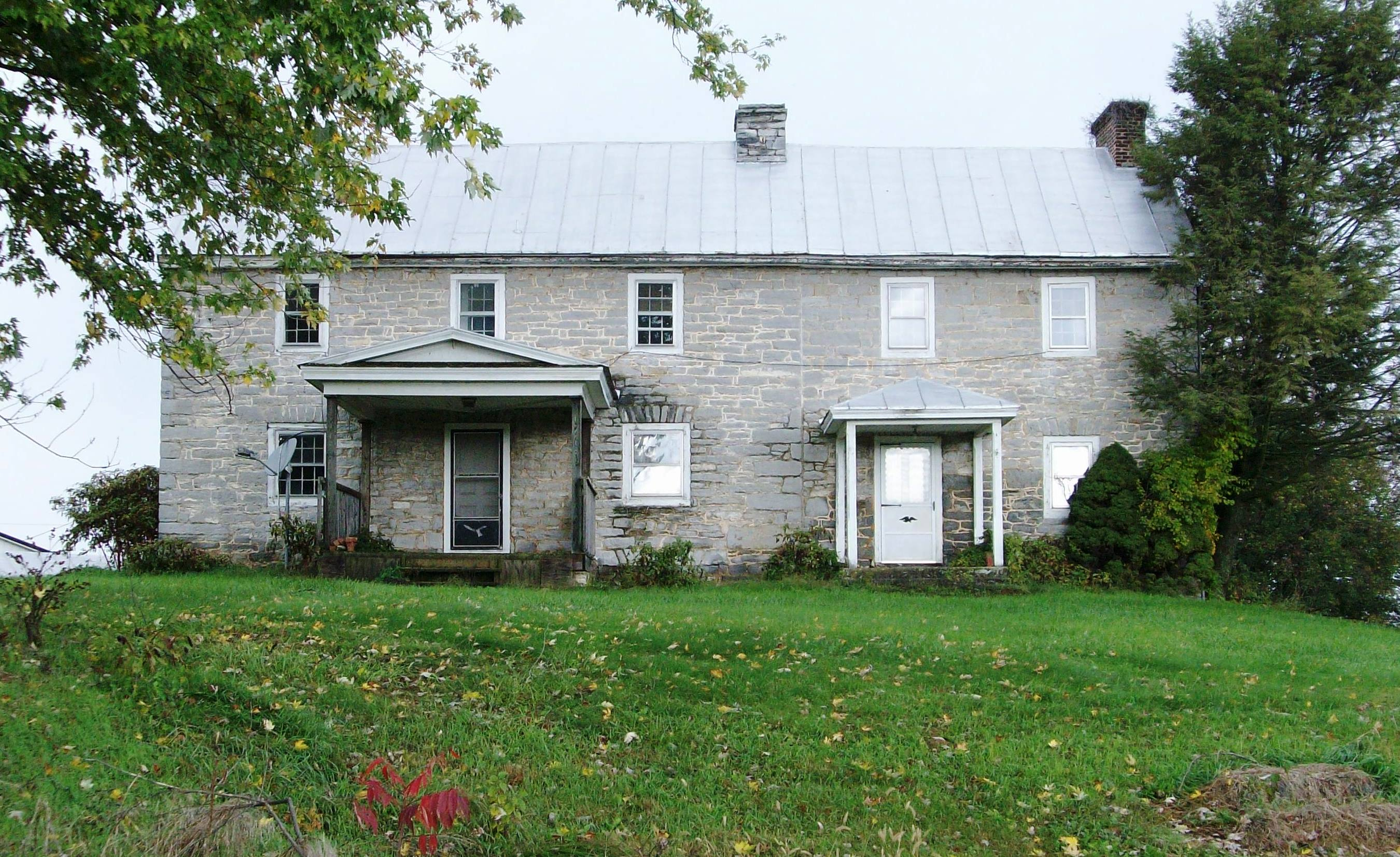
Peebles Homestead House

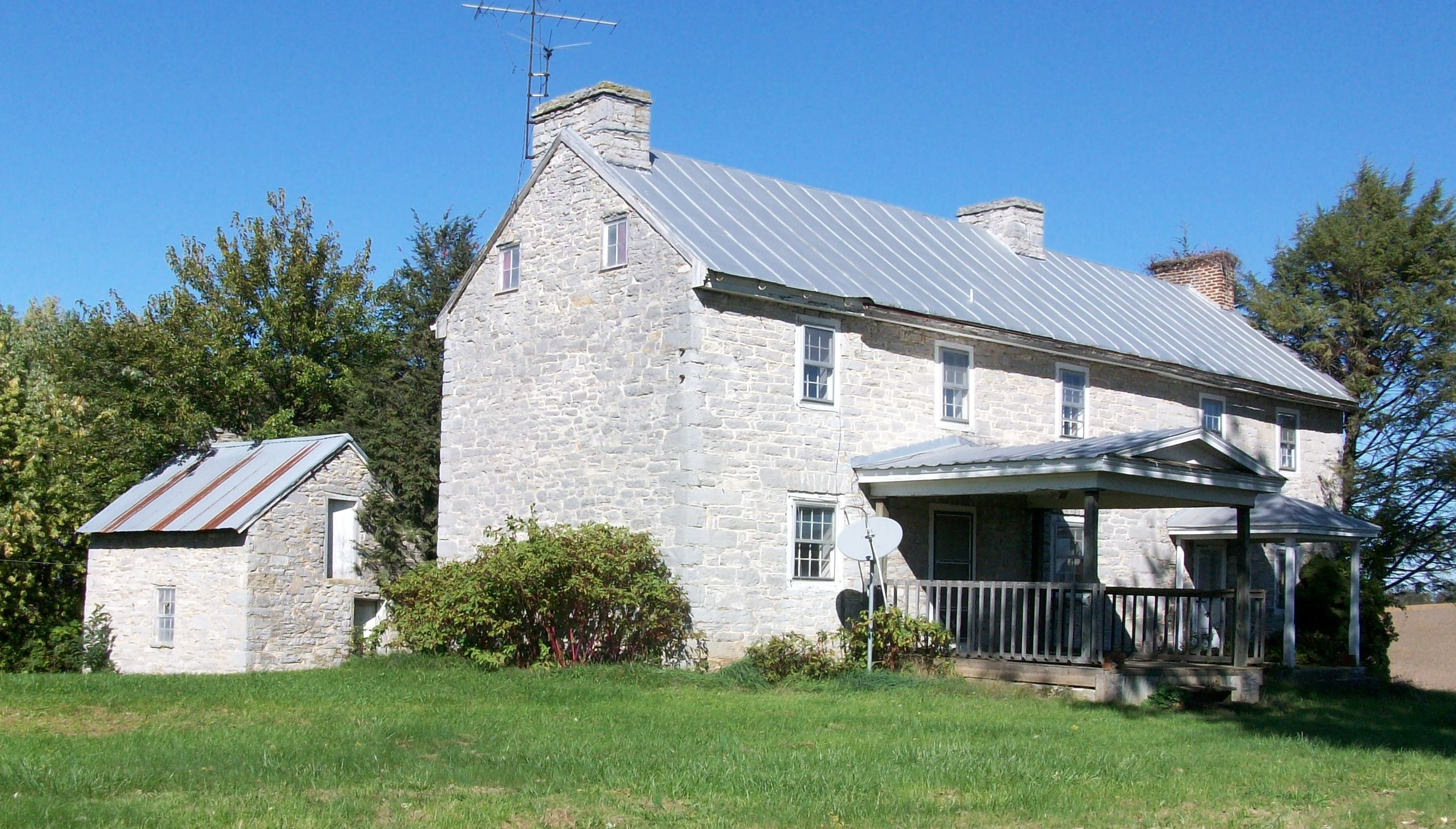
Peebles Homestead- House and Summer Kitchen

The Peebles family built a two-story, 3-bay, limestone home in the middle of their land grant. The home is a traditional English/ Scot-Irish, Georgian style, center entry home which measures 36 feet by 21 feet, and is one room deep. Limestone chimneys are located at each end of the original home.

The dimensions of the original home, the number of windows, and the number of lights (window panes) coincide with the 1798 Direct Tax records. The 1798 Direct Tax also lists a 16 x 18 wood kitchen, a log barn and a log smith (blacksmith) shop. The log barn and log smith shop have not survived, but a 16 foot by 18 foot detached limestone kitchen has survived. The kitchen is located to the rear of the home and contains a large open hearth fireplace with a limestone chimney. A one-story 22 foot by 21 foot addition with a limestone chimney was added to the Eastern part of the home. It is believed that the George McCormick family built the addition soon after acquiring the property in 1838, and later added the second story to the addition. Today, with the addition, the home measures 58 feet by 21 feet. The addition does not appear on the 1798 Direct Tax.

== Pennsylvania Historical and Museum Commission archaeology ==
In 2007 the property was surveyed at the request of the Pennsylvania Historical and Museum Commission (PHMC). The survey lists the George McCormick family as the original settlers on the homestead and as the builders of the limestone home. A memo dated November 26, 2007 names the “McCormick Farm” as eligible for the National Register of Historic Places and recommended Phase I archaeology. Phase I archaeology was performed and identified a “potentially significant historic archaeology site—the McCormick House Kitchen Midden”. Phase II archaeology was completed in 2008, and with further research, it was determined that the Alexander Peebles family settled the property before the McCormick family, and the Peebles family built the limestone home. It was also determined that the kitchen midden site was previously disturbed and was not intact. The archaeology report concluded that the kitchen midden site would not provide significant information about the history of the region so the property was deemed not eligible for the National Register of Historic Places under Criterion D. However, the site was listed as eligible for the National Register of Historic Places under Criterion A (event) and C (design/construction). The kitchen midden site was the only area on the property where archaeology research was performed. Archaeology of the kitchen midden recovered 1,347 artifacts, primarily ceramics. All artifacts recovered during archaeology were turned over to the State Museum of Pennsylvania.

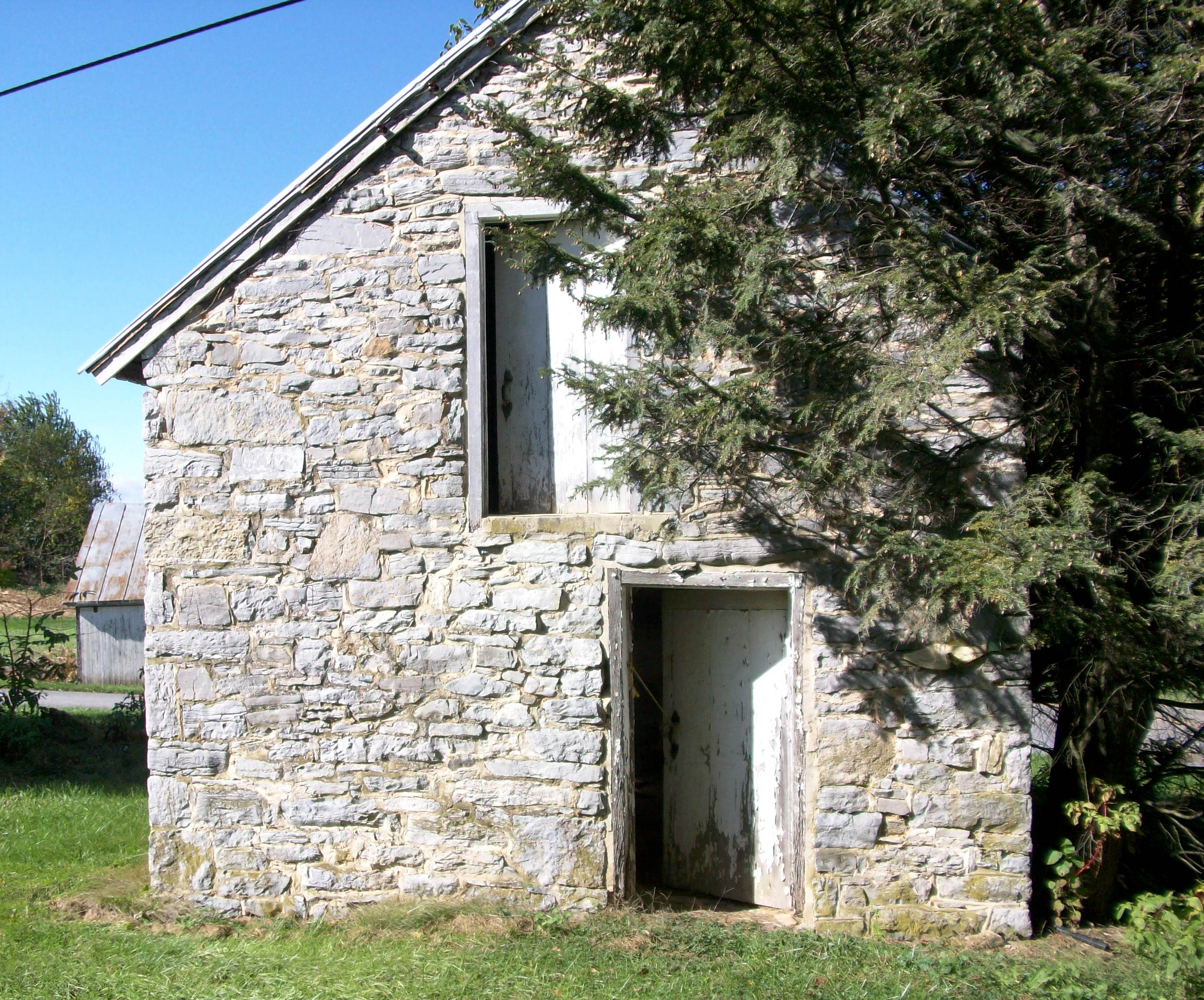
Peebles Homestead- Summer Kitchen

== Chain of ownership ==
Upon Alexander Peebles Sr.’s death, the homestead was conveyed to his son Alexander Peebles, Jr.. In 1838 the property was conveyed to George McCormick by Robert Irwin and Eliza Irwin, widow of Alexander Peebles, Jr.. George McCormick died in 1850 and willed the property to his wife, Nancy. She indentured the property to her son, James K. McCormick who inherited the property upon his mother’s death. James McCormick sold the property to a local businessman, David “D.T.” Holland in 1884. After the death of David Holland and his wife, Anne Louise, the Merchants Trust Company of Chambersburg sold the property to R.O. Brechbiel and his wife Laura in 1943. The Brechbiel's sold the property to Jacob T. Brechbiel and Lillian Brechbiel in 1943 who sold the property in 1953 to William E. Reeder. William Reeder sold the property to Clarence E. Cramer and S. Helen Cramer in 1956 who sold the property to Clarence E. Cramer Jr. and Lena J. Cramer in 1972. Clarence and Lena sold the property to The Beistle Company in 1994.

== The homestead today ==
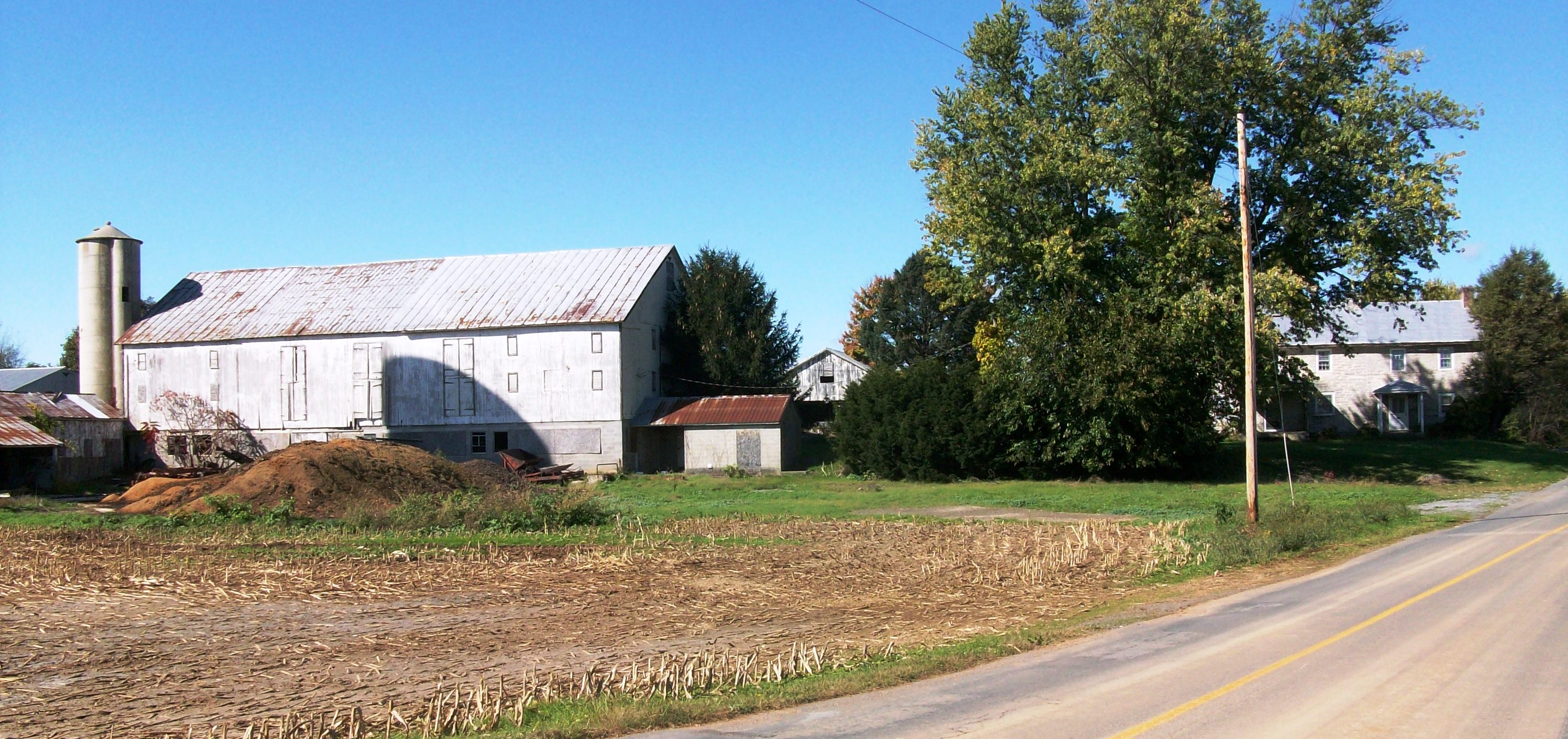
Peebles Homestead- barn, house, and outbuildings

The homestead is currently 156 acres and retains the original homestead home, summer kitchen, a large bank barn, corn crib, two silos, and outbuildings which supported a dairy operation. The dairy operation ceased in 1994 when the Cramer family sold the property to a local manufacturing company, The Beistle Company. The home is unoccupied, and the farmland is currently cultivated by a local dairy farmer. The property is eligible for the National Register of Historic Places under Criterion A and Criterion C. In 2022, the Peebles Homestead was recognized by Preservation Pennsylvania by placement on their "At Risk" list which draws attention to statewide endangered historic properties. In 2024, the Homestead was added to the Cumberland County Historical Society's "Opportunities Watchlist". The Watchlist calls attention to historic properties that are of concern to local residents. A Facebook page, The Peebles Homestead and Alexander Peebles of Shippensburg PA, is available for the public to view. The Peebles Homestead is representative of a progressive farm in the Cumberland Valley, ranging from the Colonial Period to present day.
