= General Gore =

General Gore may refer to:

- Charles Stephen Gore (1793–1869), British Army general
- John F. Gore (born 1926), U.S. Marine Corps major general
- Ralph Gore, 1st Earl of Ross (1725–1802), British Army general

== Fiction ==
- General Gore (character), fictional character in the film Friend of the World by Brian Patrick Butler
