= Dykeman's Spring =

Historic fish farm in Pennsylvania, US

- U.S. National Register of Historic Places
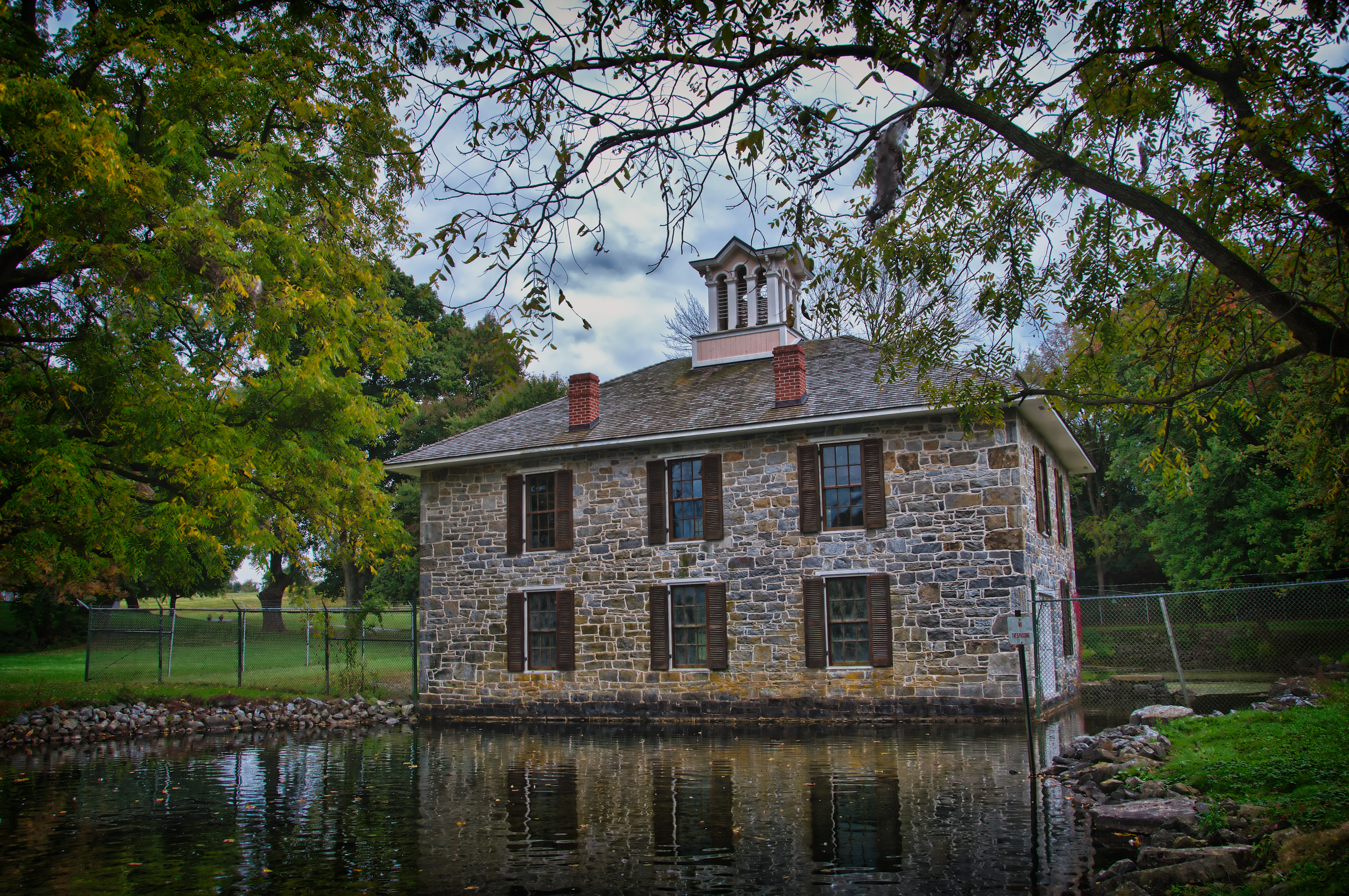

- Location within Pennsylvania Location within the United States
- Location: Dykeman Rd., 0.25 mi E of PA 696, Shippensburg, Pennsylvania
- Coordinates: 40°02′33″N 77°30′57″W
- Area: 21.2 acres (8.6 ha)
- Built: 1871
- Built by: Dykeman, George R.
- Architectural style: Italian Villa
- NRHP reference No.: 99000645
- Added to NRHP: May 27, 1999

Dykeman's Spring, also known as Ainsworth Fish Farm and Asper Tract, is a historic fish farm located at Shippensburg in Cumberland County, Pennsylvania. The property has two contributing buildings, three contributing sites, and one contributing structure. They are the Dykeman manor house (1871), hatch house (1871), the engineered structure of two connected ponds, and Dykeman's spring and two archaeological sites. The Dykeman manor house was originally built about 1855, and remodeled and enlarged in the Italian Villa style in 1871. It is a 2 1/2-story, brick dwelling, 5-bays wide and 4-bays deep, on a limestone foundation. It features a hipped roof topped by six foot square cupola. The hatch house is a two-story limestone building measuring 31 feet wide by 36 feet deep. The trout hatchery opened in 1871.

It was listed on the National Register of Historic Places in 1999.

Dykeman Park is a 50-acre municipal park that includes Dykeman's Spring. The park includes the buildings, pond, a wetlands nature trail, picnic facilities, walking trails, and a baseball/softball field.
