= Benjamin Blythe Homestead =

Historic house in Pennsylvania, United States

- U.S. National Register of Historic Places
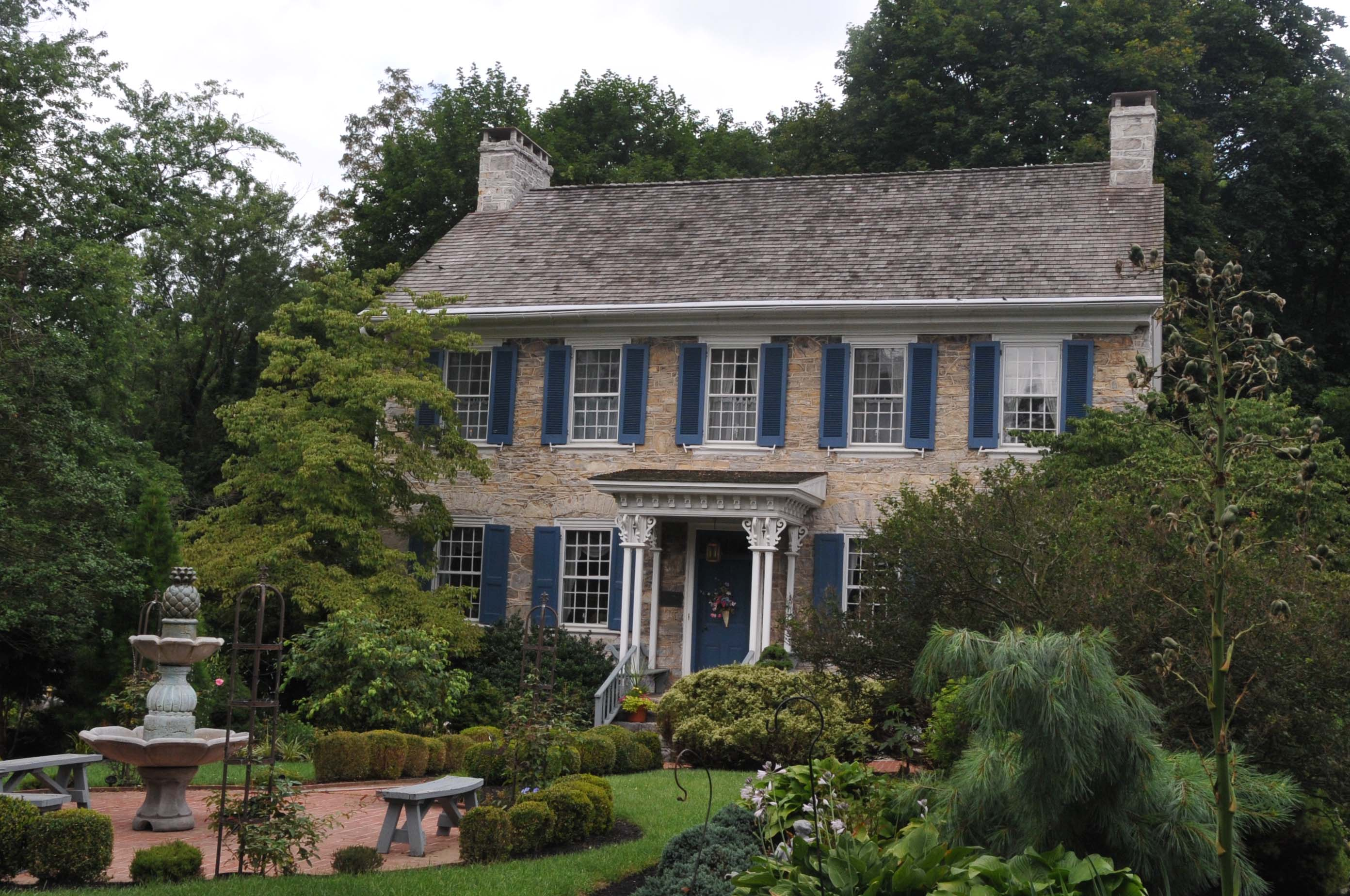

- Location within Pennsylvania Location within the United States
- Location: 217 Means Hollow Road, Shippensburg, Pennsylvania
- Coordinates: 40°2′3″N 77°30′43″W
- Area: 3 acres (1.2 ha)
- Architectural style: Georgian
- NRHP reference No.: 77001160
- Added to NRHP: September 15, 1977

Benjamin Blythe Homestead, also known as Hazel Glen and Blythstead, is a historic home located at Shippensburg in Cumberland County, Pennsylvania, United States. It was built before 1798, and is a two-story, limestone house in the Georgian style, with a rear kitchen ell. Also on the property is a contemporary limestone barn measuring 37 by 80 feet (11 by 24 m). Benjamin Blythe was one of the first 15 settlers of the Shippensburg area.

It was listed on the National Register of Historic Places in 1977.
