= Shippensburg Historic District =

Historic district in Pennsylvania, United States

- U.S. National Register of Historic Places
- U.S. Historic district
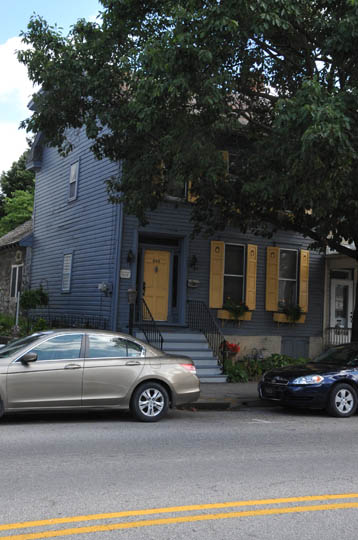

- Location within Pennsylvania Location within the United States
- Location: Roughly bounded by Lutz Ave., Kenneth, Spring, and Fort Sts., Shippensburg, Pennsylvania
- Coordinates: 40°03′08″N 77°31′11″W
- Area: 76 acres (31 ha)
- Architectural style: Late 19th And 20th Century Revivals, Late Victorian, Vernacular Georgian
- NRHP reference No.: 84003346
- Added to NRHP: June 7, 1984

Shippensburg Historic District is a national historic district located at Shippensburg, Cumberland County, Pennsylvania. The district includes 324 contributing buildings in the central business district and surrounding residential areas of Shippensburg. Most of the contributing buildings date to the mid- to late-19th century, with a few dated to the mid-18th century. Residential areas include notable examples of the Late Victorian and Vernacular Georgian styles. The oldest buildings are log and stone structures and include the Shippen House and Widow Piper's Tavern. Other notable buildings are the Rippey House, William Brookins House, Steward-Goodhart House, Methodist Church, Lutheran Church, and Presbyterian Church.

It was added to the National Register of Historic Places in 1984.
