= Eastern Connecticut State University =

Public university in Willimantic, Connecticut, U.S.

- Former names: Willimantic State Normal School (1889–1937); Willimantic State Teachers College (1937–1967); Eastern Connecticut State College (1967–1983)
- Motto: Connecticut's Public Liberal Arts University
- Type: Public university
- Established: 1889; 137 years ago
- Parent institution: Connecticut State University System
- Academic affiliations: Space-grant
- President: Karim Ismaili
- Faculty: 221 (FT); 315 (PT)
- Students: 4,125 (Spring 2022)
- Undergraduates: 3,929 (Spring 2022)
- Postgraduates: 169 (Spring 2022)
- Location: Willimantic, Connecticut, U.S. 41.721°N 72.218°W
- Campus: 182 acres (74 ha); Suburban
- Colors: Navy blue & burgundy
- Nickname: Warriors
- Sporting affiliations: NCAA Division III—Little East
- Mascot: Willi The Warrior
- Website: easternct.edu

Eastern Connecticut State University (Eastern, Eastern Connecticut, Eastern Connecticut State, or ECSU) is a public university in Willimantic, Connecticut, United States. Founded in 1889, it is the second-oldest campus in the Connecticut State University System and third-oldest public university in the state.

Eastern Connecticut State University is a member of the Connecticut State Colleges & Universities.

== History ==
The Connecticut General Assembly established the Willimantic State Normal School in 1889. As a normal school, the institution trained schoolteachers. The first class was of thirteen female students, who attended classes on the third floor of the Willimantic Savings Institute. The first male student entered in 1893.

In 1890, the Town of Windham deeded 6 acres (2.4 ha) to the State of Connecticut for the construction of a new campus for the school. The larger campus was completed in 1895. The first dormitory, Burr Hall, opened in September 1921. The institution was renamed Willimantic State Teachers College in 1937, after it began granting bachelor's degrees. The original Normal School building was destroyed in a fire and replaced by Shafer Hall, which was dedicated in 1946.

The State College created its first graduate program (in education) in 1953. After expanding its programs and campus, it became Eastern Connecticut State College in 1967, and Eastern Connecticut State University in 1983.

== Campus ==
Eastern's campus, which is spread over 182 acres (74 ha), is divided into three areas: South Campus, North Campus, and the University Sports Complex. South Campus is the historic part of the university and includes buildings such as Burr Hall, the school's first dormitory, which dates back to 1921. North Campus, the more modern part of the university, is home to the library, the fine arts instructional center, and the student center.

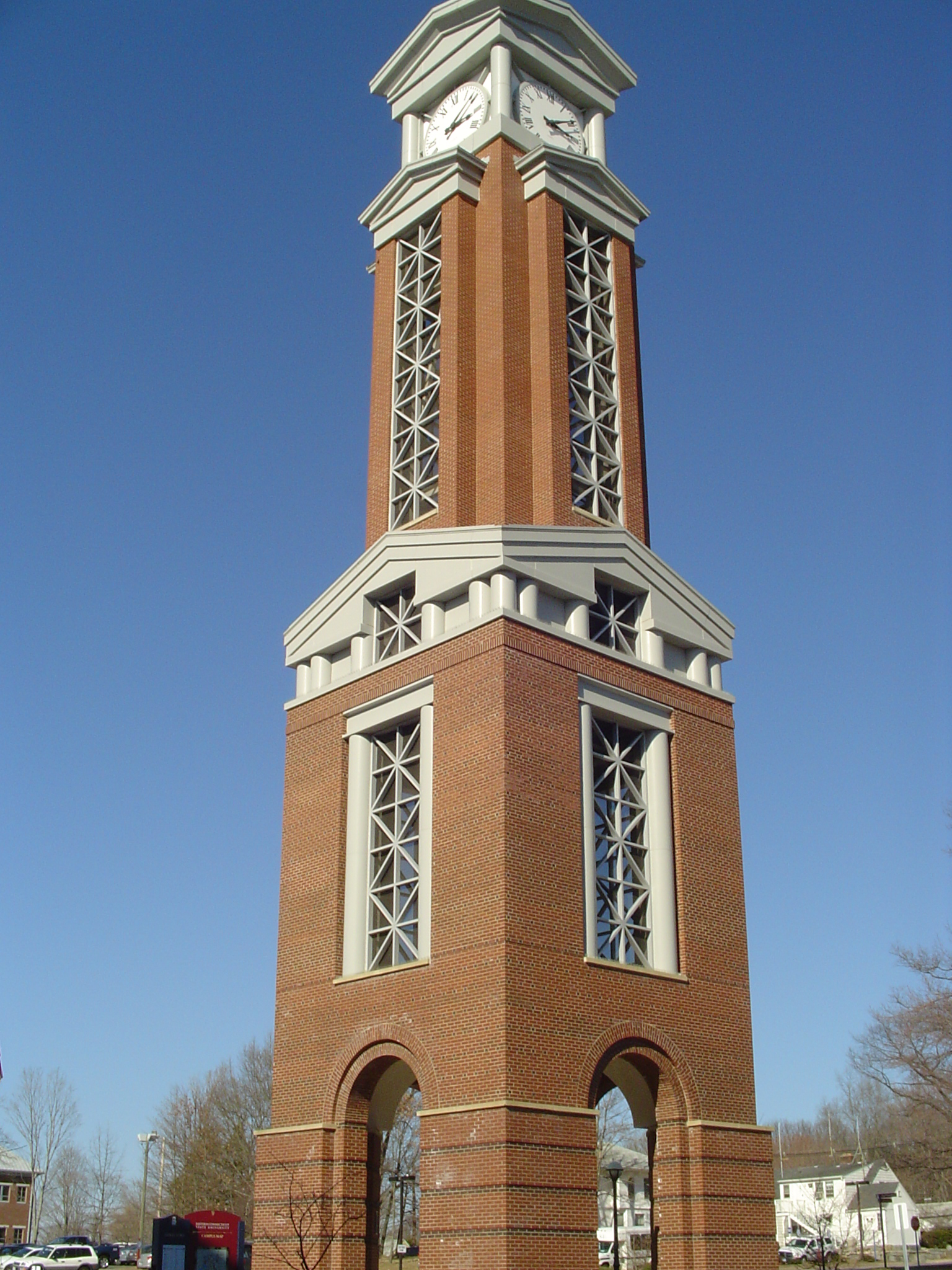
ECSU's Clock Tower

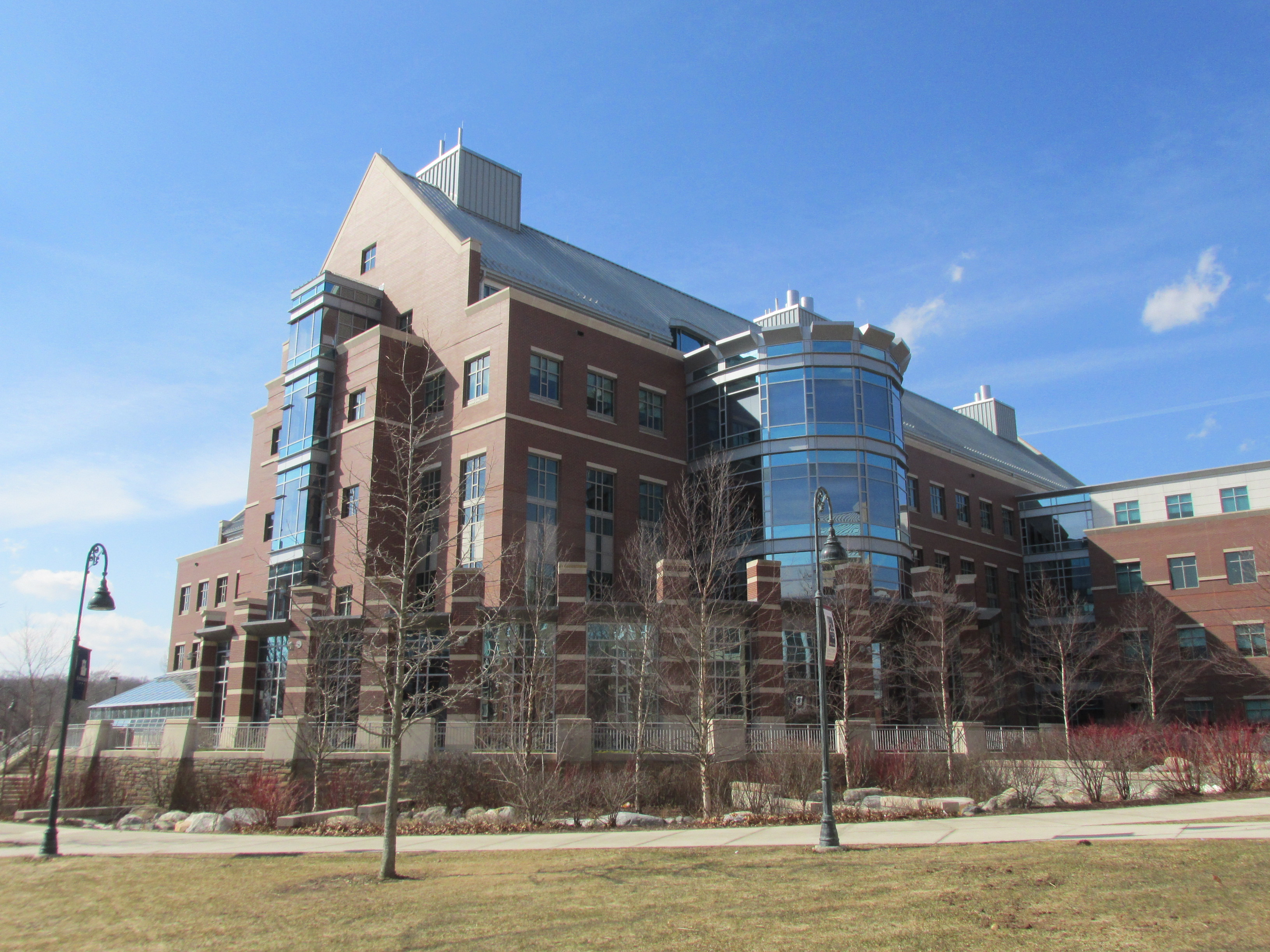
ECSU's Science Building

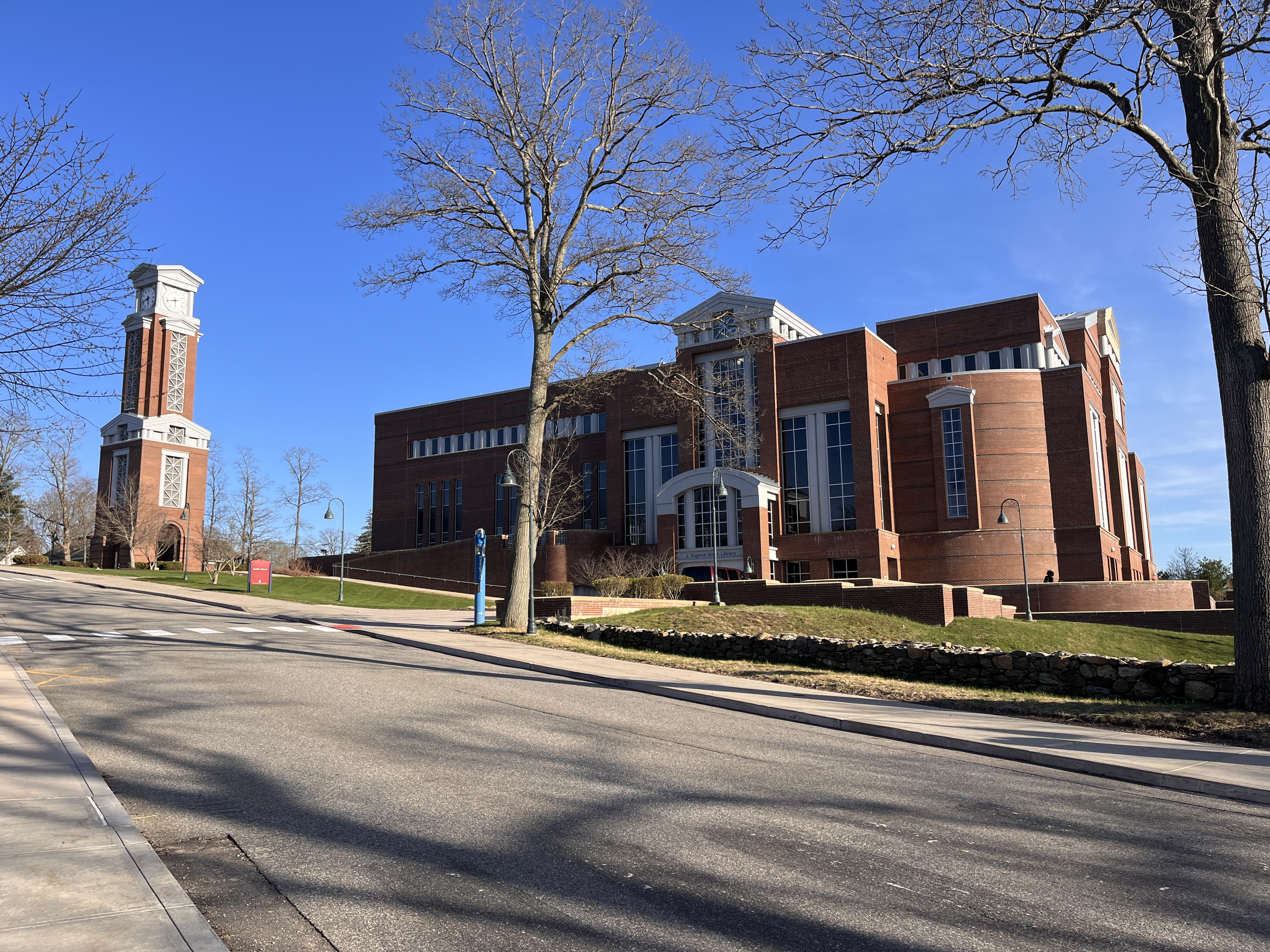
The J. Eugene Smith Library (right) and clock tower (left)

== Academics ==
Academic rankings

Regional
- U.S. News & World Report: 66 (tied)

Undergraduate demographics as of Fall 2023
Race and ethnicity	Total
White	64%
Hispanic	14%
Black	9%
Unknown	6%
Two or more races	4%
Asian	2%
Economic diversity
Low-income (Note: The percentage of students who received an income-based federal Pell grant intended for low-income students.)	32%
Affluent (Note: The percentage of students who are a part of the American middle class at the bare minimum.)	68%

Academically, the university is organized into two schools, the School of Arts and Sciences, the School of Education and Professional Studies. Eastern has 41 majors, 65 minors, and more than 60 concentrations to choose from.

Graduate study programs offered through the School of Education and Professional Studies include Applied Data Science, Accounting, Education, Teacher Certification, and Organizational Management.

== Rankings ==
For 2026, U.S. News & World Report ranked Eastern tied for #66 out of 178 Regional Universities North, #23 in Regional Universities North Top Public Schools, and #37 in Regional Universities North Best Value Schools.

== Undergraduate admissions ==
In 2024, the university accepted 80.5% of undergraduate applicants, with those admitted having an average 3.4 GPA. The university does not require submission of standardized test scores, Eastern being a test optional school. Those submitting test scores had an average 980–1190 SAT score (62% submitting scores) or average 16–28 ACT score (2% submitting scores).

== Institute for Sustainable Energy ==
The Institute for Sustainable Energy was opened in 2001 and focuses on sustainable energy education, serving as a source for sustainable energy information, assistance in sustainable energy policy making, and assistance in implementing sustainable energy solutions. The institute is located at 182 High Street. The current director is William Leahy.

In 2012 Eastern had a stationary phosphoric acid fuel cell, known as the PureCell System Model 400, installed on the west side of its Science Building. Eastern will use 100 percent of the energy produced by the fuel cell system to provide a majority of the power required for the Science Building, while maximizing the use of the heat output available. Under a 10-year Energy Services Agreement (ESA) with ClearEdge Power, the installation was made possible by a federal American Recovery and Reinvestment Act (ARRA) grant through CEFIA.

== Housing ==
87 percent of first-year students, and 60 percent of all full-time undergraduates live in college housing. The campus is separated into first-year halls and upperclassman halls. All students with sophomore status and higher are eligible to live in upperclassman halls. There are six first-year halls, five upperclassman halls and two sets of apartments.

== Student organizations ==
Eastern offers more than 90 student organizations in which students can participate, including athletic, political, cultural, artistic and communication clubs. The campus newscast is ETV. The Student Government Association is the liaison between the student body and university administration and each residence hall has a student council that plans events and trips for hall residents.

== Athletics ==
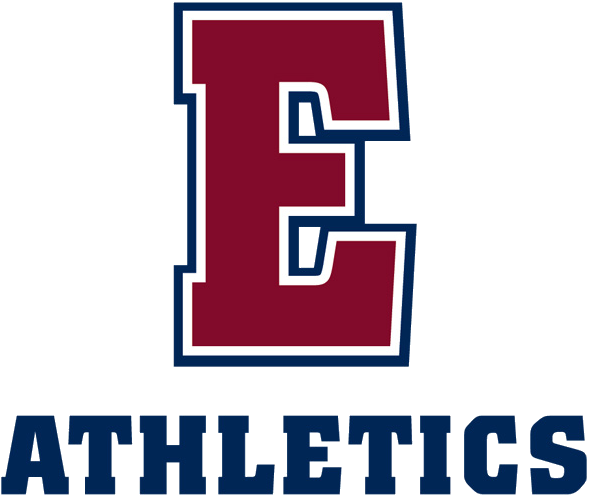
ECSU athletics wordmark

Eastern's sports teams are known as the "Warriors" and are represented by a logo depicting a "E". The university is a member of the NCAA Division III, the Little East Conference and the Eastern College Athletic Conference. Men's varsity sports include baseball, basketball, cross country, lacrosse, soccer, golf and indoor and outdoor track and field. Women's varsity sports include basketball, cross country, field hockey, lacrosse, soccer, softball, swimming, golf, indoor and outdoor track and field, and volleyball.

Intramural sports include men's and women's tennis league, co-ed indoor and outdoor soccer, co-ed dodgeball, men's and women's flag football, men's and women's volleyball, co-ed softball, ultimate frisbee league, men's and women's basketball league, co-ed floor hockey, wiffle ball tournament, golf. Club sports include competitive cheerleading, fencing club, football club, ice hockey club and rugby club.

The men's baseball team won the NCAA Division III national championship five times (1982, '90, '98, '02, '22). The women's softball team won national championships five times (1981 (AIAW Div. III), '82, '85, '86, and '90 − NCAA).

== Notable alumni ==
- Chimamanda Ngozi Adichie - Nigerian writer
- Pat Boyd – Connecticut State Representative
- Kevin Brown – Connecticut State Representative
- Christopher D. Coutu - former Connecticut State Representative
- William A. Cugno - former Adjutant General of the Connecticut National Guard
- Anne Dauphinais - Connecticut State Representative
- Mark DeCaprio - Connecticut State Representative
- Edward Gaffney - Michigan State Representative
- David W. Gay - former Connecticut Adjutant General of the Connecticut National Guard
- Thomas J. Gibson - chancellor of the University of Wisconsin–Milwaukee and the University of Wisconsin–Stevens Point
- Susan Johnson - Connecticut State Representative
- Camille Kostek - model including on the cover of Sports Illustrated Swimsuit Issue, television presenter, and actress
- Brian Lanoue - Connecticut State Representative
- Victoria Leigh Soto - Sandy Hook Elementary School teacher killed in the massacre

== See also ==
- Connecticut State University System
- WECS
