= David W. Gay =

United States Army general (born 1935)

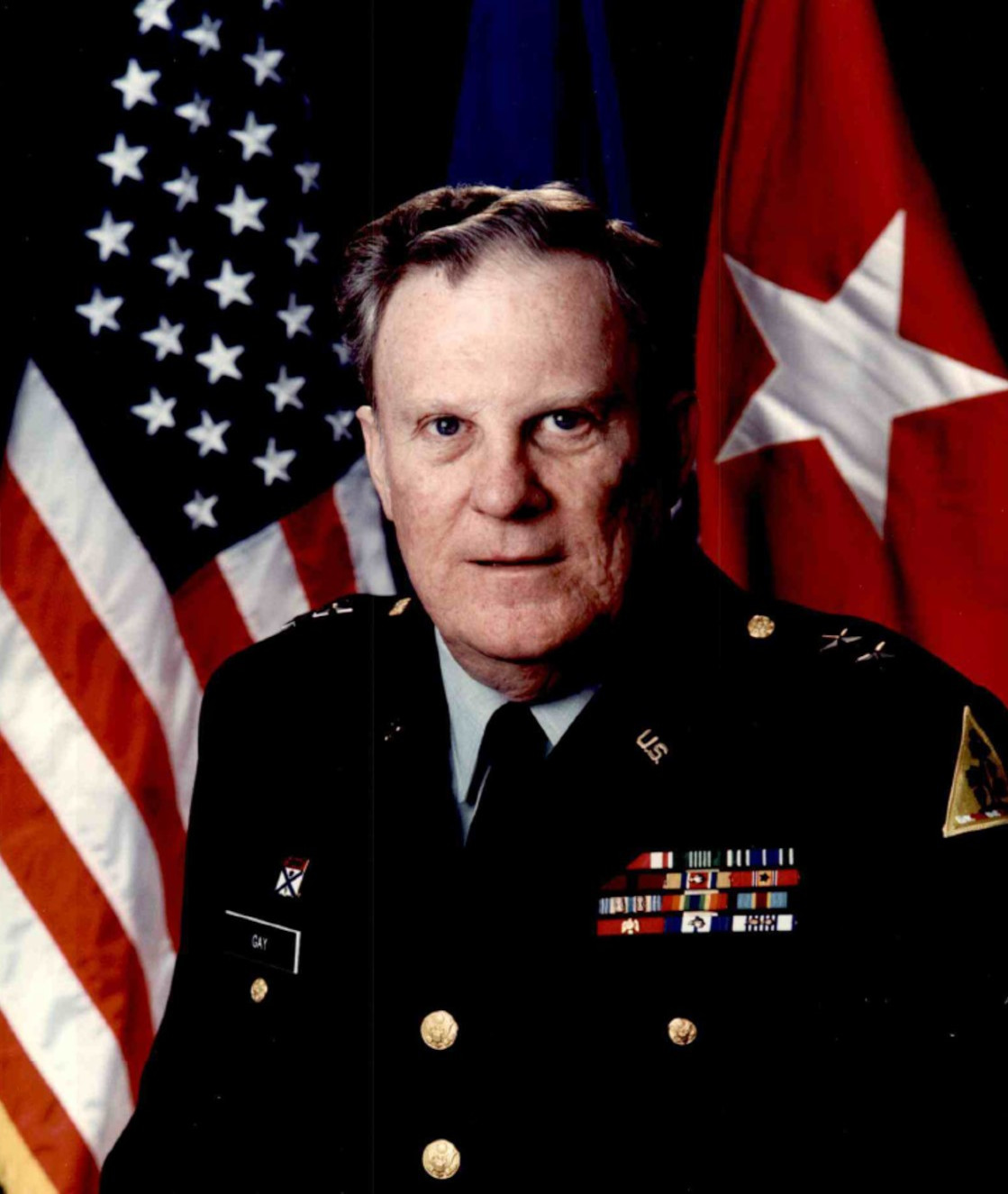
- Major General Gay
- Born: July 3, 1935 (age 91); Brooklyn, New York City, US
- Spouse: Nancy S. Gay (m. 1961; died 2015)
- Military career
- Branch: United States Army
- Rank: Major General (CT); Brigadier General (USAR)
- Service number: 1265390
- Commands: Connecticut National Guard; 1st Missile Battalion, 192d Artillery
- Awards: Legion of Merit
- Website: www.ct.gov/mil

David William Gay was the Adjutant General of the state of Connecticut from 1992 to 1999. He began his military career with the United States Marine Corps and later transferred to the Army. He served for over 39 years in the military.

== Education ==
Gay earned Associate of Science degrees in general studies and in law enforcement from Manchester Community College. He then received a Bachelor of Arts degree from Eastern Connecticut State University. Gay also attended courses at the National Defense University, the United States Army Command and General Staff College, Air University and the United States Army War College.

== Military career ==
Gay left for basic training in the Marine Corps on July 3, 1953. He was discharged from the Marine Barracks at the Submarine Base, after serving 20 months in Korea. After three years of active duty, he transferred to the USMC Reserve, before enlisting in the Connecticut National Guard in the Nike Missile Program. He was discharged from the enlisted ranks on November 17, 1962, to accept a commission as a second lieutenant after graduating from the United States Army Field Artillery School, Ft. Sill, OK.

He spent the early part of his career in the 1st Missile Battalion, becoming a battery commander. He transferred to the infantry in 1971, remaining there until 1977. He continued to rise through the ranks and served a two-year active duty tour as the United States Property & Fiscal Officer (USPFO) from 1989 to 1992.

=== Appointment to Adjutant General ===
With the sudden resignation of Major General John T. Gereski in March 1992, Governor Lowell P. Weicker appointed him to the position of Adjutant General. He was confirmed as a United States Army Reserve brigadier general on March 11, 1993. After Gay completed Gereski's term, Governor Weicker appointed him to a full four-year term effective July 1, 1994. He continued to serve as Adjutant General under Governor John G. Rowland until May 31, 1999, when he retired.

Under his command, the Connecticut National Guard was active in community service programs orientated towards children. He began the “Drug Demand Reduction Program" with offshoot programs such as "Take Charge", "Character Counts Coalition" and "Aviation Role Models for Youth".

== After the military ==
Major General Gay remained active in the public arena after his tenure as Adjutant General. Governor Rowland appointed General Gay to chair. The Statewide 2K readiness in his committee. Early in 2000, he was then appointed president and CEO of OPSAIL 2000 CT (The International Tall Ships). He was appointed to the board of trustees for Community-Technical Colleges in Connecticut in the February 2002 session of the Connecticut General Assembly and was also appointed as Chairman of the Citizens' Ethics Advisory Board of the Office of State Ethics on October 1, 2011. His highest military award received is the Defense Service Metal. Civilian awards include: National Award for Americanism from UNICO, Center of Influence Award from California Institute of Ethics.

== Personal ==
David W. Gay married his wife Nancy on September 30, 1962, in Hartford. Together they have three children: David Jr. born July 27, 1963, Jennifer born March 10, 1965, and Stephen born on May 30, 1969. He has eight grandchildren, Sara, Kate, Emily, Caitlin, Anna, Matthew, Callie and Shannah.

Military offices
Preceded by John T. Gereski	Connecticut Adjutant General; March 12, 1992 - May 31, 1999	Succeeded by William A. Cugno
