= Shippensburg Township, Pennsylvania =

Township in Pennsylvania, US

Coordinates: 40°04′00″N 77°30′59″W

- Township
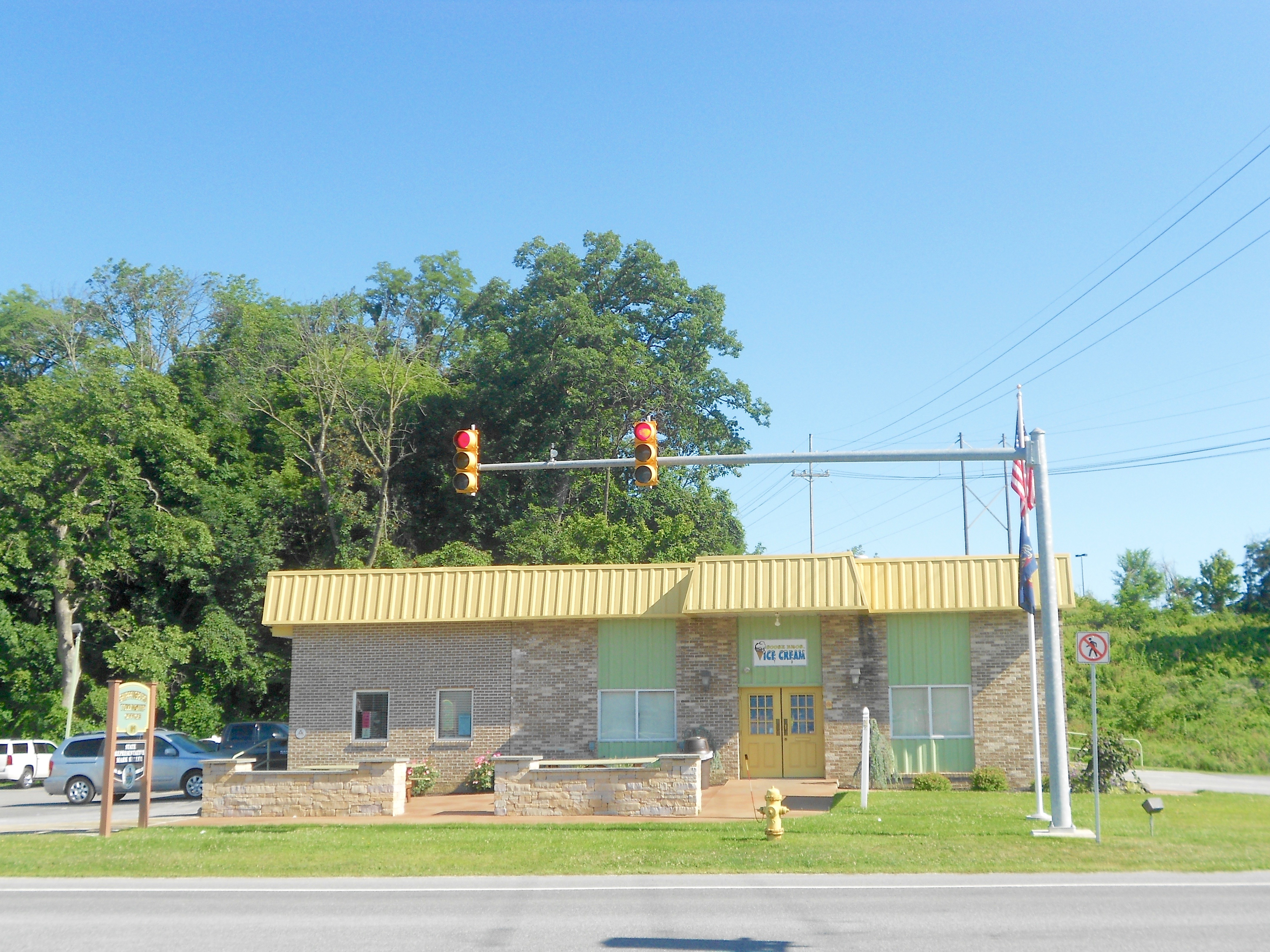
- Shippensburg Township Office

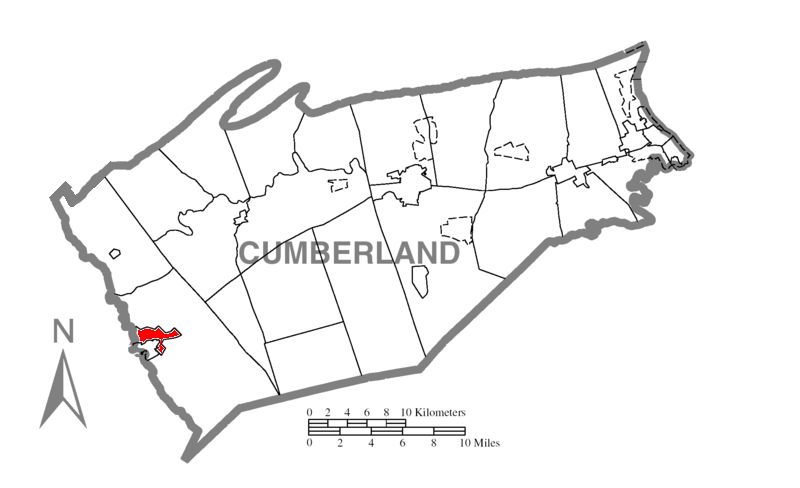
- Map of Cumberland County, Pennsylvania highlighting Shippensburg Township

- Map of Cumberland County, Pennsylvania
- Country: United States
- State: Pennsylvania
- County: Cumberland

Government
  - Type: Board of Supervisors

Area
  - Total: 2.53 sq mi (6.55 km^{2})
  - Land: 2.52 sq mi (6.52 km^{2})
  - Water: 0.012 sq mi (0.03 km^{2})

Population (2010)
  - Total: 5,429
  - Estimate (2016): 5,480
  - Density: 2,177.5/sq mi (840.73/km^{2})
- Time zone: UTC-5 (Eastern (EST))
  - Summer (DST): UTC-4 (EDT)
- ZIP code: 17257
- Area code: 717
- FIPS code: 42-041-70360
- Website: shippensburgtownship.com

Shippensburg Township is a township in Cumberland County, Pennsylvania, United States, adjacent to the borough of Shippensburg. The population of the township was 5,429 at the 2010 census, up from 4,504 at the 2000 census. The township is the location of the majority of the property of Shippensburg University of Pennsylvania.

== Geography ==
Shippensburg Township is in western Cumberland County, bordering the borough of Shippensburg on the borough's north and east sides, and partially on the south. The western boundary of the township, following Middle Spring Creek, forms the boundary with Franklin County. Shippensburg University is in the western part of the township; the campus is recorded by the U.S. Census Bureau as the Shippensburg University census-designated place. The township extends east as far as Interstate 81, Exit 29.

Three small areas of the township, all separate from one another and from the main body of the township, are located south of Shippensburg borough, between the borough limits and the Franklin County line. According to the United States Census Bureau, the township has a total area of 2.53 square miles (6.55 km^{2}), of which 2.52 square miles (6.52 km^{2}) is land and 0.01 square miles (0.03 km^{2}), or 0.50%, is water.

== Demographics ==
Historical population
| Census | Pop. | Note | %± |
|---|---|---|---|
| 2010 | 5,429 | | — |
| 2016 (est.) | 5,480 | | 0.9% |
U.S. Decennial Census

As of the census of 2000, there were 4,504 people, 860 households, and 388 families residing in the township. The population density was 1,786.2 people per square mile (689.7 people/km^{2}). There were 938 housing units at an average density of 372.0 per square mile (143.6/km^{2}). The racial makeup of the township was 93.65% White, 3.73% African American, 0.04% Native American, 1.13% Asian, 0.04% Pacific Islander, 0.38% from other races, and 1.02% from two or more races. Hispanic or Latino of any race were 1.13% of the population.

There were 860 households, out of which 20.6% had children under the age of 18 living with them, 34.4% were married couples living together, 6.5% had a female householder with no husband present, and 54.8% were non-families. 25.3% of all households were made up of individuals, and 6.3% had someone living alone who was 65 years of age or older. The average household size was 2.49 and the average family size was 2.79.

In the township the population was spread out, with 7.5% under the age of 18, 68.5% from 18 to 24, 11.0% from 25 to 44, 6.2% from 45 to 64, and 6.8% who were 65 years of age or older. The median age was 20 years. For every 100 females, there were 89.2 males. For every 100 females age 18 and over, there were 88.9 males.

The median income for a household in the township was $27,661, and the median income for a family was $40,521. Males had a median income of $26,141 versus $20,259 for females. The per capita income for the township was $8,712. About 8.1% of families and 36.8% of the population were below the poverty line, including 7.0% of those under age 18 and 12.7% of those age 65 or over.

== Education ==
The school district is Shippensburg Area School District.

The majority of Shippensburg University of Pennsylvania is in Shippensburg Township, including the sections of the census-designated place.
