= John T. Gereski =

United States Army general

Major General (CT) John T. Gereski
- Born: April 14, 1936; Waterbury, Connecticut, US
- Died: November 4, 2007 (aged 71); Fairfax Station, Virginia, US
- Burial place: Waterbury, Connecticut, US
- Spouse: Diana T. Calabro
- Military career
- Allegiance: United States
- Branch: United States Army
- Rank: Major General (Connecticut)
- Service number: 21008353
- Unit: 143d Tank Battalion (United States)
- Commands: Connecticut National Guard
- Awards: Legion of Merit
- Website: www.ct.gov/mil

John Thomas Gereski (April 14, 1936 – November 4, 2007) was the Adjutant General of the State of Connecticut 1985 to 1992.

== Early life ==
Born in Waterbury, Connecticut, and raised in Union City, Gereski graduated from Sacred Heart High School in 1953.

== Military career ==
Gereski enlisted in the Connecticut National Guard on June 17, 1956, at the age twenty. He reached the rank of Sergeant as a member of the 143d Tank Battalion in Naugatuck, Connecticut. He attended the Connecticut Military Academy's Officer Candidate School (OCS) in 1957. Upon graduation, he was discharged as an enlisted soldier and accepted an appointment as a second lieutenant on June 6, 1957. He served his career as a full-time National Guardsman with several tours at the National Guard Bureau in Virginia. John Gereski attended the National War College, studying national security policy formulation and implementation. His thesis was entitled “Can the Reserve Components Perform as Adequate Backup Force to Active Components in the 1980s?”

Colonel John T. Gereski was recalled from his position at the Pentagon by Governor William A. O'Neill on March 18, 1985, to complete the unexpired term of Major General John F. Gore, who was forced to resign as Adjutant General due to improper behavior. Governor O'Neill appointed him to a full four-year term on July 1, 1986, and again on July 1, 1990. During his second full term as Adjutant General, he oversaw the largest mobilization of Connecticut National Guard forces in forty years due to Operation Desert Storm.

=== Resignation ===
Governor O'Neill did not seek reelection in 1990 and was succeeded by former Senator Lowell P. Weicker as governor. MG Gereski had been reappointed to a four-year term just six months prior to Weicker taking office as governor. The two did not always agree and MG Gereski offered his resignation on March 11, 1992, with over two years remaining on his term.

== Personal life ==
John Gereski married Diana T. Calabro of Waterbury, Connecticut, on July 7, 1962. Together they had three children, John Jr. born on April 12, 1963, David born on March 5, 1965, and Duane born on June 21, 1971. Diana would follow her husband between assignments in Connecticut and Virginia, working as a school teacher. They retired to Fairfax Station, VA to be close to family and a vacation home on the Chesapeake Bay. John died on November 4, 2007, and Diana followed him on February 8, 2009. At the time of their death, they had six grandchildren. Gereski and his wife were interred at Calvary Cemetery in Waterbury, CT.

Military offices
Preceded by John F. Gore	Connecticut Adjutant General; March 18, 1985 – March 11, 1992	Succeeded by David W. Gay
