= Sujatha baliga =

Attorney and restorative justice practitioner

sujatha baliga
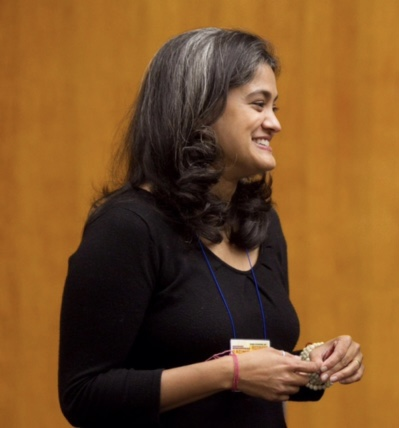
- Baliga in 2011
- Born: 1970 or 1971 (age 54–55)
- Education: Harvard University (AB); University of Pennsylvania Law School (JD)
- Occupations: Restorative justice practitioner; public speaker; attorney
- Known for: Forgiveness; restorative justice
- Website: www.sujathabaliga.com

Sujatha baliga (born 1970/1971) is an American attorney and restorative justice practitioner who won the MacArthur Fellowship in 2019.

== Biography ==
Baliga was born and raised in Shippensburg, Pennsylvania. Baliga attended Harvard University and the University of Pennsylvania Law School.

She is the director of the Restorative Justice Project at Impact Justice in Oakland, California. For her work there she was awarded a 2019 MacArthur "Genius" Grant. She was one of two Oaklanders awarded the grant in 2019, the other being Walter Hood.

Her approach to justice was significantly influenced by a meeting with the Dalai Lama when she was 24 years old. Seeking advice on how to work on behalf of oppressed people without being consumed by anger, she was advised to meditate and open her heart to the enemy. This guidance led her to intensive meditation practice and a shift toward restorative justice, which she views as a paradigm shift away from punitive systems toward healing and accountability.

She prefers that her name be uncapitalized (sujatha baliga).
