= Widow Piper's Tavern =

- U.S. National Register of Historic Places
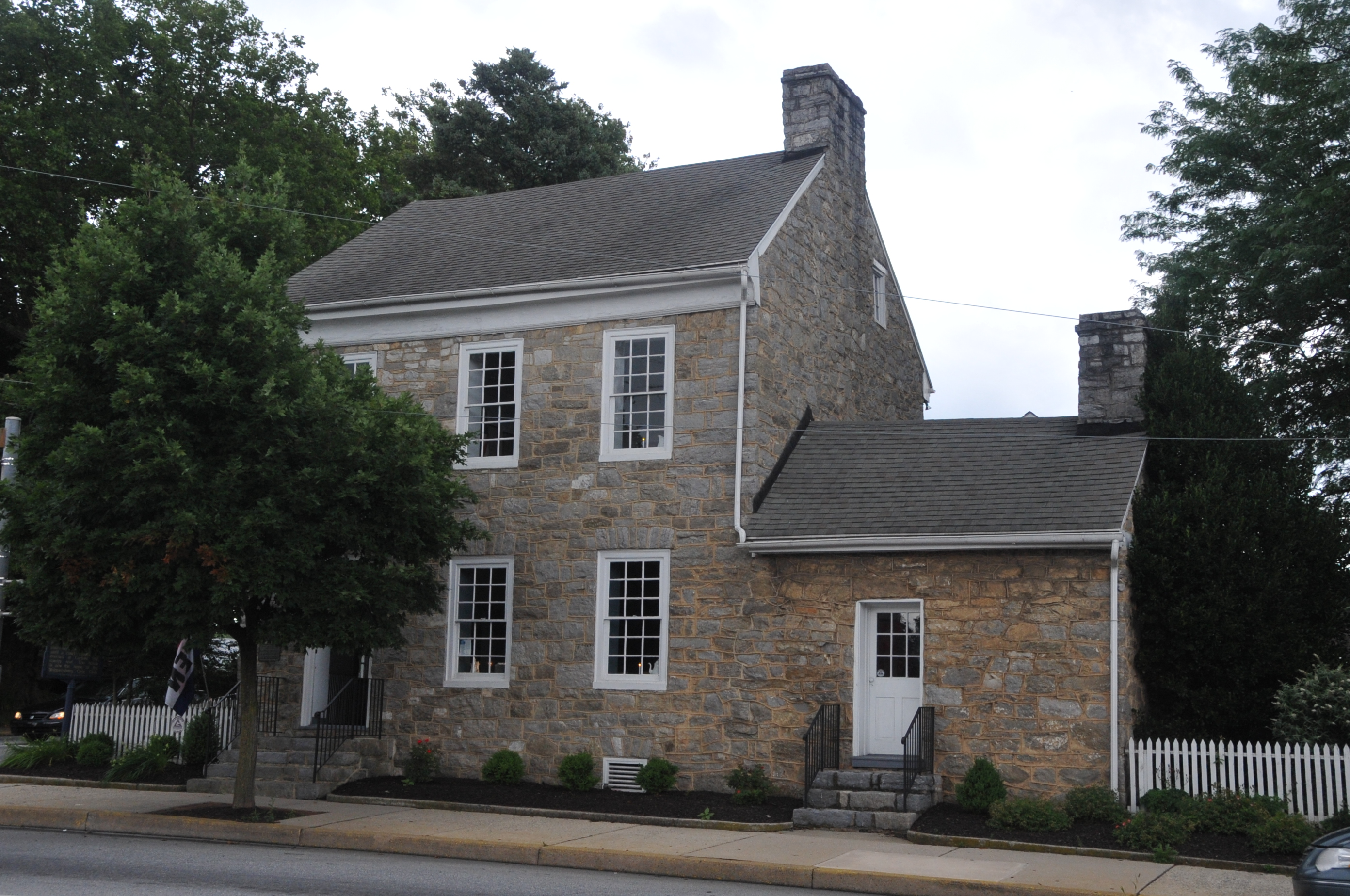
- The building in 2007

- Location within Pennsylvania Location within the United States
- Location: SW corner of King and Queen Sts., Shippensburg, Pennsylvania
- Coordinates: 40°3′16″N 77°30′48″W
- Area: less than one acre
- Built: c. 1735
- NRHP reference No.: 74001779
- Added to NRHP: January 17, 1974

Widow Piper's Tavern, also known as the Old Courthouse and Shippensburg Civic Center, is a historic inn and tavern located at Shippensburg in Cumberland County, Pennsylvania. It was built about 1735, and is a 2 1/2-story, irregular stone building with a 1-story kitchen wing. It housed the First Court of General Sessions of the Peace from July 1750 to April 1751. The building was donated to the Civic Club of Shippensburg in the 1930s.

It was listed on the National Register of Historic Places in 1974. It is located in the Shippensburg Historic District.
