= Shippensburg University =

Public university in Shippensburg, Pennsylvania, US

Shippensburg University of Pennsylvania
- Former names: Cumberland Valley State Normal School (1871–1927); State Teachers College at Shippensburg (1927–1960); Shippensburg State College (1960–1983)
- Type: Public university
- Established: 1871; 155 years ago
- Endowment: $76.7 million (2025)
- President: Charles E. Patterson
- Faculty: 302 full time 130 part time
- Undergraduates: 6,942 full-time
- Postgraduates: 1,311 full-time
- Location: Shippensburg, Pennsylvania, U.S. 40°03′43″N 77°31′21″W
- Campus: Rural, 200 acres (81 ha)
- Nickname: Raiders
- Sporting affiliations: NCAA Division II – PSAC
- Mascots: Big Red and Shippo the Hippo
- Website: ship.edu
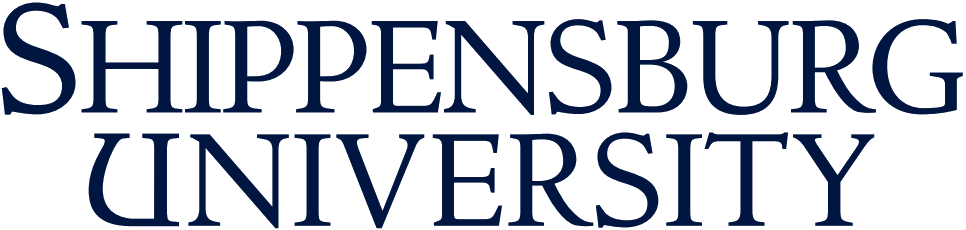

- Cumberland Valley State Normal School Historic District
- U.S. National Register of Historic Places
- U.S. Historic district
- Location within Pennsylvania Location within the United States
- Location: Roughly bounded by N. Prince St., Stewart, Old Main, Gilbert and Henderson Drs., Shippensburg, Pennsylvania
- Area: 7 acres (2.8 ha)
- Built: 1870
- Architect: Samuel Sloan
- Architectural style: Second Empire architecture, Classical architecture
- NRHP reference No.: 85000076
- Added to NRHP: January 11, 1985

Shippensburg University of Pennsylvania, commonly known as Shippensburg University (Ship or SU), is a public university in the Shippensburg, Pennsylvania area. It is part of the Pennsylvania State System of Higher Education.

Founded in 1871, it later became the first teachers' college in Pennsylvania. Shippensburg University is accredited by the Middle States Commission on Higher Education.

== History ==
The commonwealth legislated the State Normal School for "the education and training of teachers" in the seventh district (seven counties) to be in Shippensburg, and in 1871 the cornerstone was laid for the 212 ft (65 m) building designated the "Cumberland Valley State Normal School". In 1917 the school was purchased by the Commonwealth of Pennsylvania.

On June 4, 1926, the school was authorized to grant the Bachelor of Science in education degree in elementary and junior high education. The school received a charter on October 12, 1926, making it the first normal school in Pennsylvania to become a state teachers college. On June 3, 1927, the State Council of Education authorized the school to change its name to the "State Teachers College at Shippensburg".

The business education curriculum was approved on December 3, 1937. On December 8, 1939, Shippensburg State Teachers College became the first teachers college in Pennsylvania and the fourth in the United States to be accredited by the Middle States Association of colleges and (Secondary) Schools.

The State Council of Education approved graduate work leading to the Master of Education degree on January 7, 1959. On January 8, 1960, the name change to Shippensburg State College was authorized.

The arts and sciences curriculum was authorized by the State Council of Education on April 18, 1962, and the Bachelor of Science in business administration degree program was initiated on September 1, 1967.

On November 12, 1982, the governor of the Commonwealth signed Senate Bill 506 establishing the State System of Higher Education. Shippensburg State College was designated "Shippensburg University of Pennsylvania" effective July 1, 1983.

Since 1985, many of the original historic buildings of the campus, including Old Main, are listed in the National Register of Historic Places.

== Campus ==
Most of the campus is in Shippensburg Township, including the sections of the census-designated place. One portion of the campus grounds is in Shippensburg Borough, and another portion is in Southampton Township.

== Academics ==
Undergraduate demographics as of Fall 2023
Race and ethnicity	Total
White	73%
Black	12%
Hispanic	7%
Two or more races	4%
Asian	2%
International student	1%
Unknown	1%
Economic diversity
Low-income (Note: The percentage of students who received an income-based federal Pell grant intended for low-income students.)	31%
Affluent (Note: The percentage of students who are a part of the American middle class at the bare minimum.)	69%

Shippensburg University offers more than 100 undergraduate programs in the College of Arts and Sciences, the College of Education and Human Services, and the John L. Grove College of Business. It also offers more than 50 master's degree programs, two doctoral programs, and three post-bachelor or post-master's certificate programs in 17 fields of study in the School of Graduate Studies.

== Rankings ==
For the 2022–2023 academic year, out of 181 colleges in the Regional Universities North division, U.S. News & World Report ranked Shippensburg University as tied for 101st overall, tied for 150th in Top Performers on Social Mobility, and tied for 33rd place in Top Public Schools.

== Athletics ==
Shippensburg University is an NCAA Division II school and one of eighteen schools to compete in the Pennsylvania State Athletic Conference (PSAC). The school maintains intercollegiate programs for baseball, basketball (men & women), cross country (men & women), field hockey, football, lacrosse (women), soccer (men & women), softball, track and field (men & women), swimming (men & women), tennis (women), volleyball (women) and wrestling. Several club sports, such as rugby (men & women), Ultimate Frisbee and the inline hockey team, also participate in independent leagues. The home venue of the university's football and track & field programs is Seth Grove Stadium. The team name is the Raiders, and the mascot is "Big Red," a red-tail hawk wearing a pirate's hat. The team colors are blue and red.

== Gallery ==
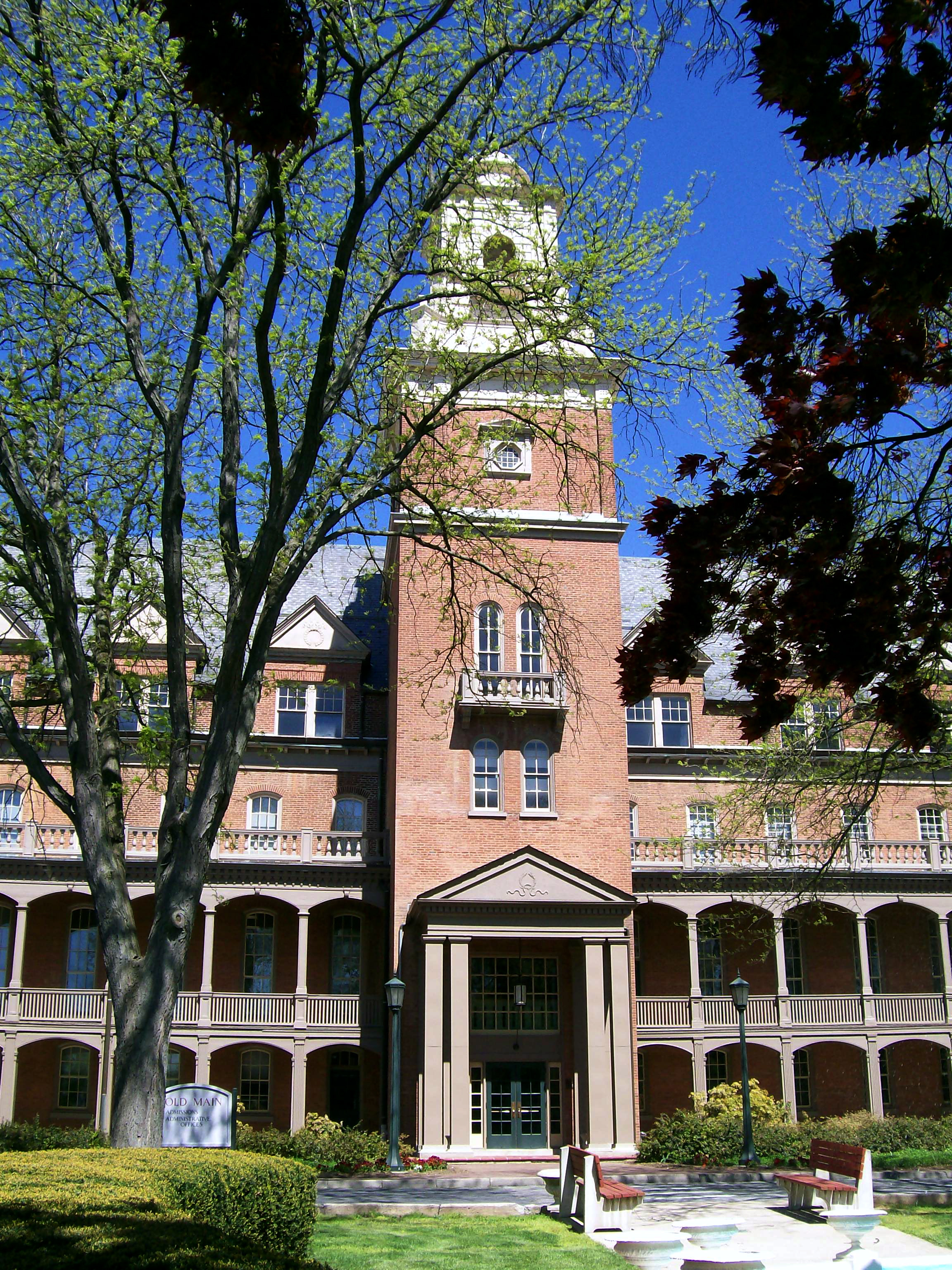
Old Main

H. Ric Luhrs Performing Arts Center

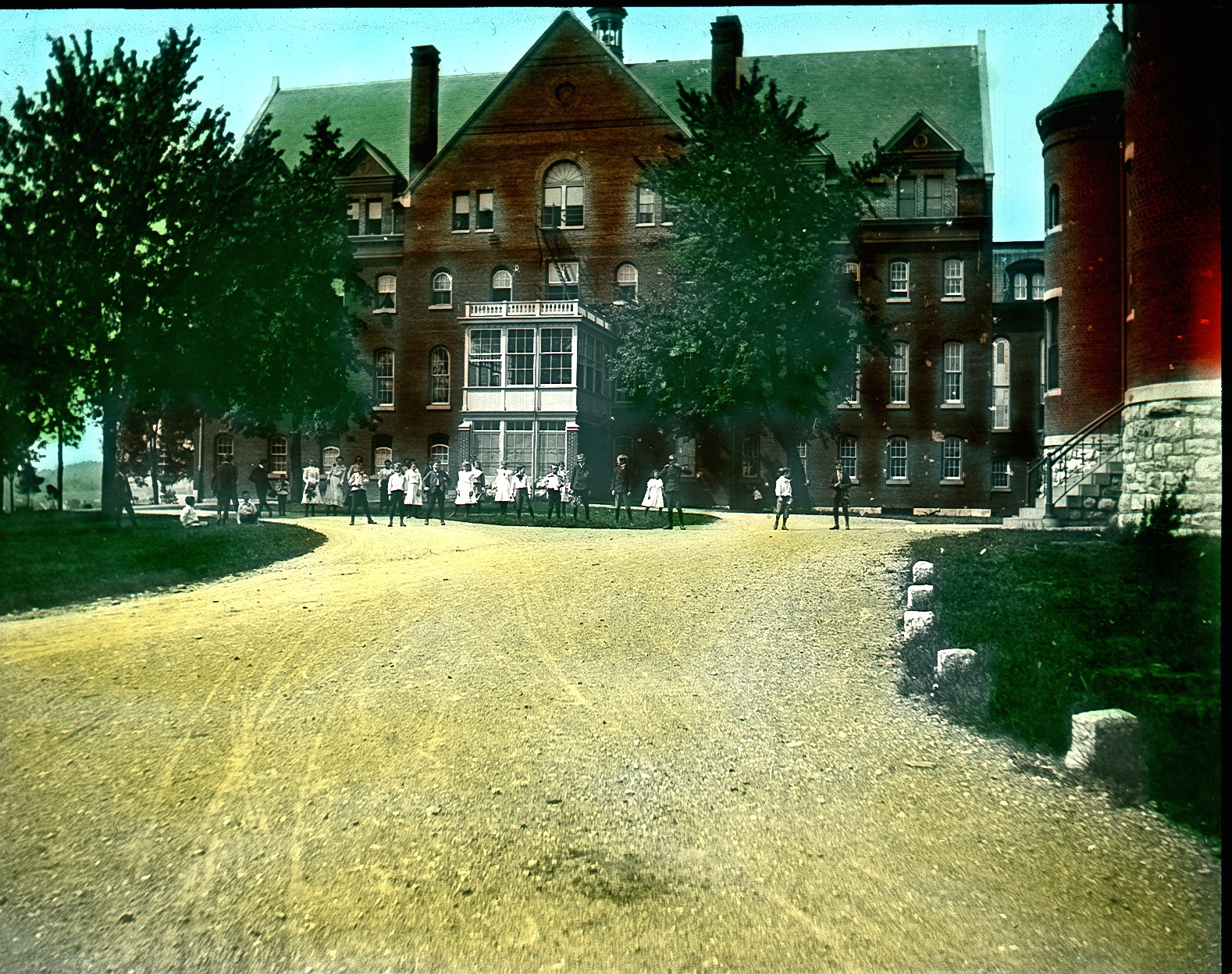
Cumberland Valley State Normal School

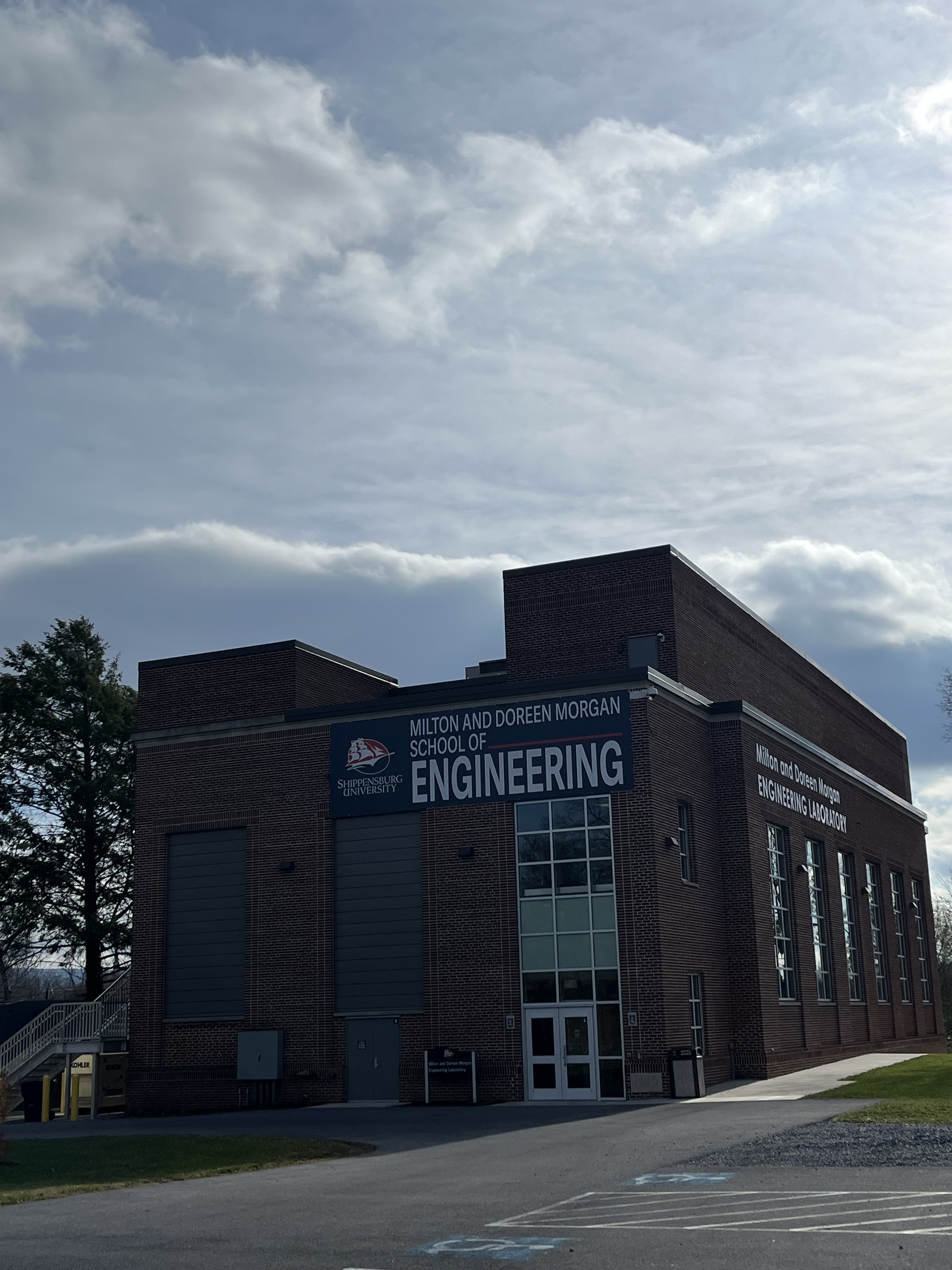
Shippensburg Engineering Building

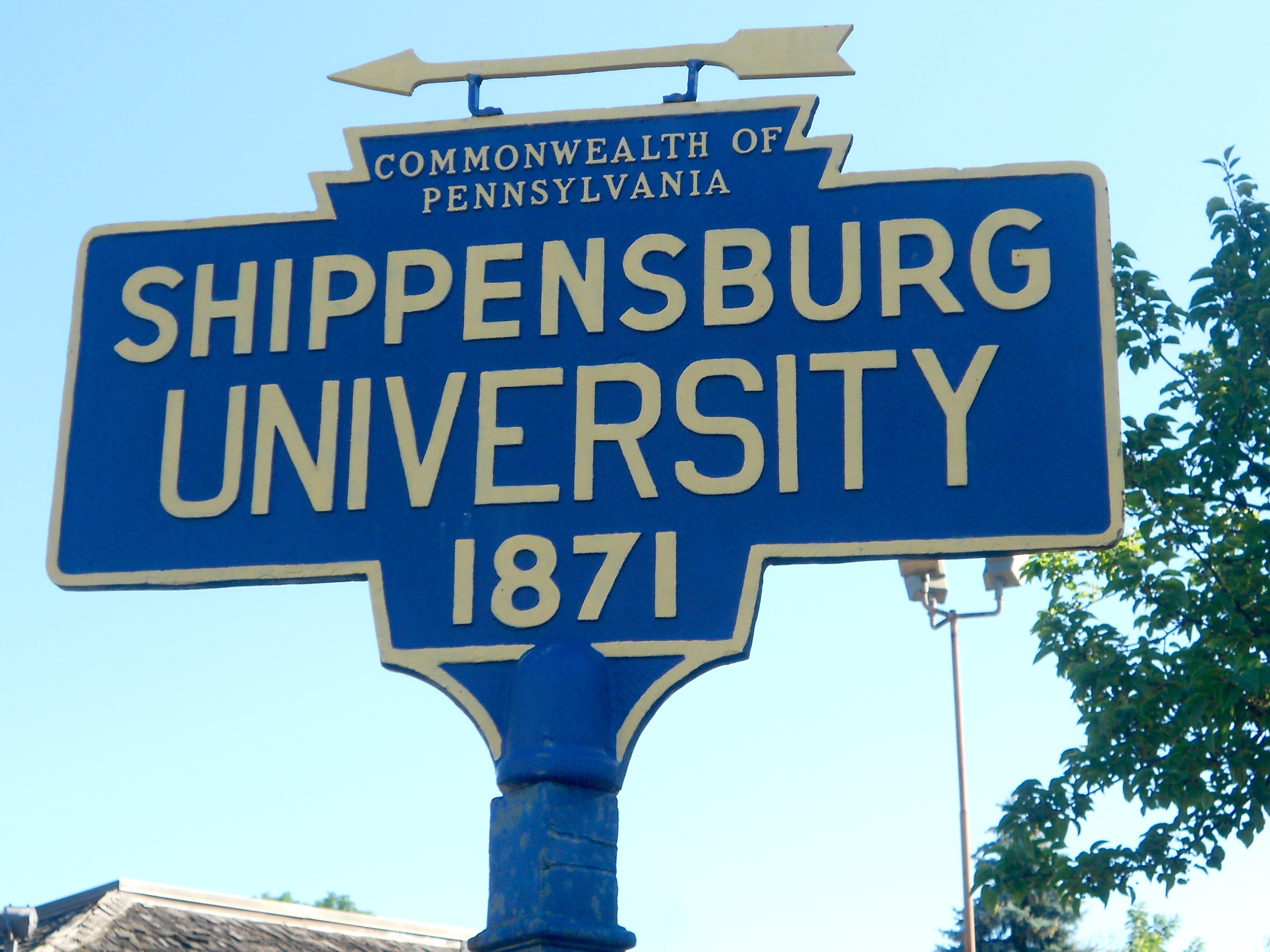
Keystone marker

== Demographics ==
Shippensburg University CDP, Pennsylvania
- Census-designated place
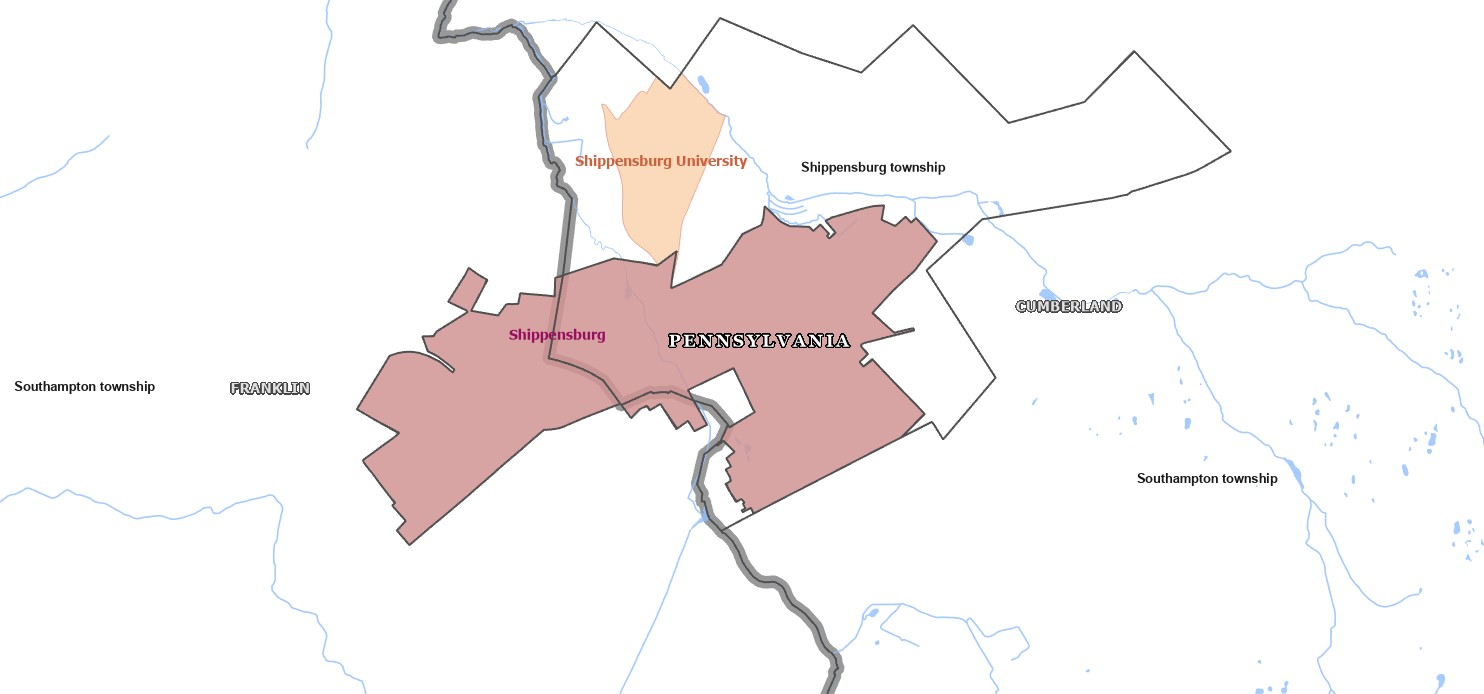
- Interactive map of Shippensburg University CDP, Pennsylvania
- Coordinates: 40°03′42″N 77°31′22″W
- Country: United States
- State: Pennsylvania
- County: Cumberland
- Township: Shippensburg

Area
  - Total: 0.28 sq mi (0.72 km^{2})
  - Land: 0.28 sq mi (0.72 km^{2})
  - Water: 0 sq mi (0.0 km^{2})
- Elevation: 646 ft (197 m)

Population (2010)
  - Total: 2,625
  - Density: 9,403/sq mi (3,630.7/km^{2})
- Time zone: UTC-5 (Eastern (EST))
  - Summer (DST): UTC-4 (EDT)
- FIPS code: 42-70362
- GNIS feature ID: 2633704

Shippensburg University CDP is a census-designated place located in Shippensburg Township, Cumberland County, in the Commonwealth of Pennsylvania.

It is situated just north of the borough of Shippensburg and covers the campus of Shippensburg University of Pennsylvania. It was first listed as a CDP in 2010.

As of the 2010 census the population of the CDP was 2,625.
