= John F. Gore =

United States Army general (1926–2016)

General John F. Gore
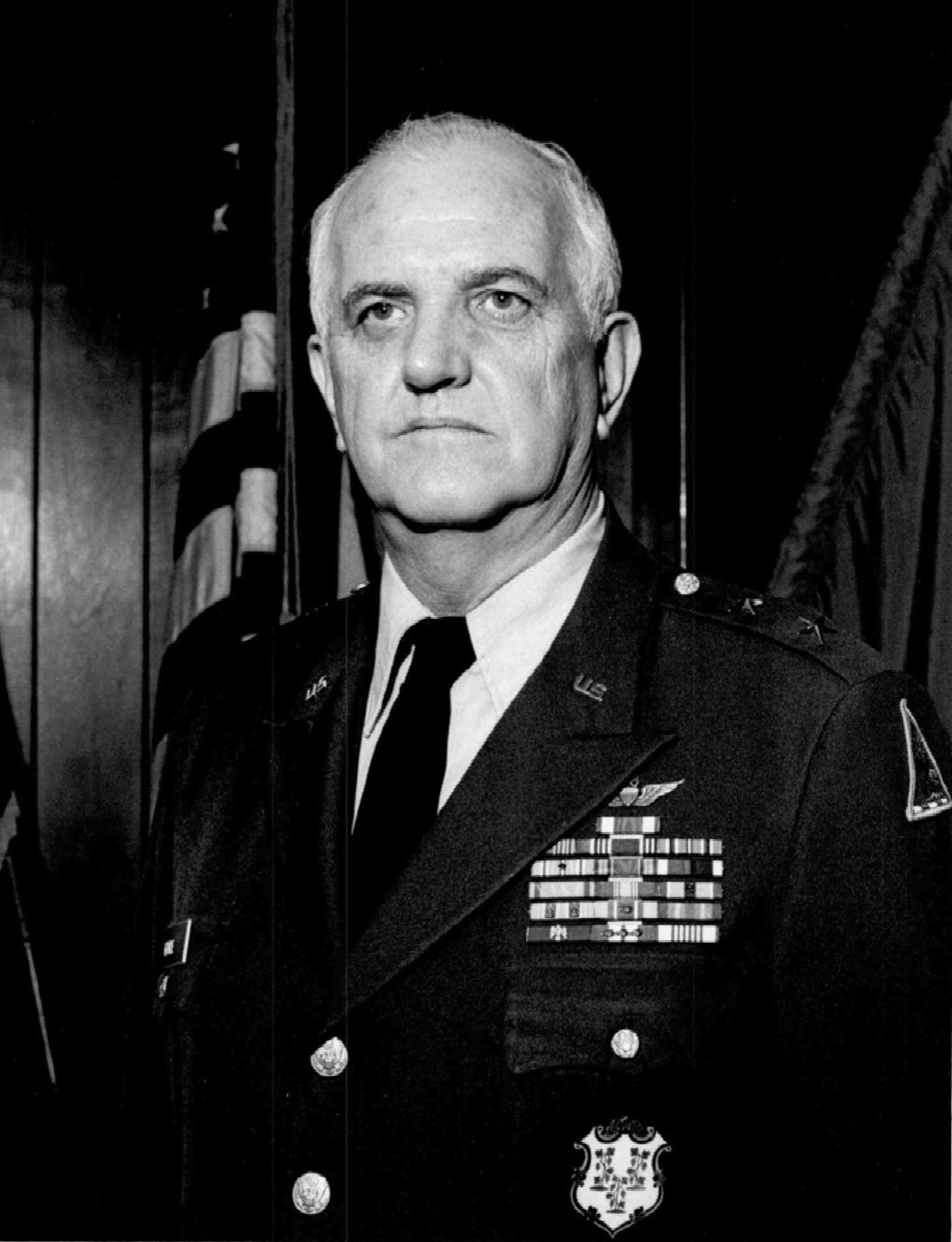
- Major General John F. Gore
- Born: March 27, 1926; New Haven, Connecticut, U.S.
- Died: November 23, 2016 (aged 90); Crossville, Tennessee, U.S.
- Education: Manchester Community College; Middlesex Community College
- Spouse(s): Georg C. Meyers (m. 1969; div. 1984); Elizabeth A. Wysocki (m. 1984)
- Children: 2
- Military career
- Allegiance: United States
- Branch: United States Army, United States Marine Corps
- Rank: Major General
- Commands: Connecticut State Militia
- Website: www.ct.gov/mil

John Francis Gore (March 27, 1926 – November 23, 2016) was an American Army major general. He served in the United States Marine Corps during World War II and with the Connecticut National Guard in the Korean War. His career would culminate with being appointed as the Connecticut Adjutant General in 1982 but would be forced to resign in 1985 amid various scandals.

== Military career ==
Gore enlisted in the United States Marine Corps in West Haven, Connecticut, in 1943 at the age of 17. He served with the First Marine Division in Okinawa and China during World War II. He was discharged as a corporal in April 1946 and returned to Connecticut. Three years later, John enlisted in the Connecticut National Guard in 1949 and was assigned to the 745th AAA Gun Battalion. The unit was called to active service in 1950 during the Korean War. Upon demobilization, Gore returned again to Connecticut and was commissioned as a second lieutenant. He served in several battery officer positions before being transferred to the 43rd Infantry Division. 2LT Gore was assigned to the Aviation Company, where he first attended the Infantry Officers’ Basic Course at Fort Benning, Georgia, followed by Army Primary Flight Training Course at Fort Rucker, Alabama. Upon receiving his Army Aviator Wings, he served in various aviation positions in the Connecticut Army National Guard.

In 1972, Gore was reassigned to the headquarters as the military support plans officer and promoted to lieutenant colonel. He then served as the military personnel officer (MILPO) and the state aviation officer, where he was promoted to colonel in 1976. In 1979 he was appointed to the position of assistant adjutant general and promoted to brigadier general, serving under Adjutant General John F. Freund.

== Service as adjutant general ==
Major General Freund reached his mandatory retirement age in April 1982 and left the Connecticut National Guard. Governor William A. O’Neill appointed Gore to replace him, and he was promoted to major general that August. His tenure would be marked by heroism and scandal.

=== Medal of Valor ===
On Sunday, April 8, 1984, at 2:41 pm, a civilian aircraft contacted the air traffic control tower in Groton, Connecticut, and reported three men clinging to a capsized boat west of Fishers Island, New York. Simultaneously, General Gore's UH-1 “Huey” helicopter – code name ‘Fury 76’ – was inbound to Lawrence Memorial Hospital on a medical emergency. Upon hearing the Air Traffic Control Tower's radio transmission, General Gore's crew completed their mission and then diverted to the site of the capsized boat. Fury 76 was not equipped with any rescue lines and had to hover over strong turbulent waters with sea waves of three to four feet. The crew was able to rescue the three survivors and flew them to Groton-New London Airport. For their bravery and disregard for their own personal safety, the six crew members of Fury 76 were awarded the Connecticut National Guard's highest military award – The Medal of Valor.

=== Scandal and resignation ===
During his tenure as adjutant general, Gore became romantically involved with a subordinate officer, which is forbidden by army regulation. After a thorough investigation, General Maxwell R. Thurman, vice-chief of staff of the US Army, severely reprimanded General Gore for an “open and improper relationship with a female subordinate.” The reprimand further stated that General Gore committed an “inexcusable failure to maintain high standards of personal conduct and judgment expected of a general.”

The report was forwarded to Governor O”Neill, who then called Gore to his office to discuss his options. A year prior to the release of the report, Gore had stated to the Governor that if his personal life ever began to interfere with his duties as adjutant general, he would resign. On February 5, 1985, Gore provided the Governor a one-sentence memo:

“Dear Governor O’Neill:

Please accept my resignation as The Adjutant General of the State of Connecticut effective at the close of business on Thursday, 7 February 1985.”

Governor O’Neill appointed John T. Gereski as his successor to fulfill the remainder of General Gore's term.

== Personal life and death ==
John Francis Gore was born on March 27, 1926, in New Haven, Connecticut, to George F. Gore and Irene S. Gore. In addition to his military career, Gore was a member of the Connecticut State Police while serving as a traditional “once a month” drilling National Guardsman from 1955 to 1964 before working for the National Guard as a full-time soldier. He married Georg C. Meyers on October 10, 1969, in New London, Connecticut. The two were divorced as a result of his inappropriate relationship with Second Lieutenant Elizabeth A. Wysocki, whom Gore would marry on November 2, 1984, in Norwich, Connecticut, while still serving as the adjutant general. He had two children from his first marriage: Marilyn and John Jr.

Gore died in Crossville, Tennessee on November 23, 2016, at the age of 90.

== Effective dates of promotion ==
Promotions
Insignia	Rank	Date
	Major general	April 27, 1982
	Brigadier general	January 4, 1979
	Colonel	June 6, 1976
	Lieutenant colonel	December 1, 1972
	Major	December 6, 1967
	Captain	December 2, 1960
	First lieutenant	August 6, 1955
	Second lieutenant	August 7, 1952

Military offices
Preceded by John F. Freund	Connecticut Adjutant General; 1982-1985	Succeeded by John T. Gereski
