= The Beistle Company =

Manufacturing company

- Industry: Manufacturing; Distribution
- Founded: 1900; 126 years ago
- Founders: Martin Luther Beistle
- Headquarters: Shippensburg, Pennsylvania, U.S.
- Key people: Henry E. Luhrs
- Website: beistle.com

The Beistle Company, or simply Beistle, is an American company known for manufacturing holiday decorations and party goods, and particularly known for its catalog of Halloween decorations. Beistle was founded in 1900 in Pennsylvania by Martin Luther Beistle, who created the company after being inspired by his experiences as a calendar salesperson and his exposure to a form of paper craft during a visit to Germany.

Beistle's line of Halloween-themed products, which was introduced in the 1920s, helped to popularize Halloween decoration in the United States. The Beistle Company is the oldest continuing manufacturer of decorations and party goods in the U.S.

== History ==
Around 1900, Martin Luther Beistle worked as a salesperson for the Pittsburgh Art Calendar Company. While in hotels showcasing his calendars, his customers commented about the lobby plants requiring water; this gave him the idea to create artificial plants made from paper, as that would eliminate the need to water them. During a visit to Heidelberg, Germany, Beistle observed a honeycombing technique which inspired him to create a line of honeycombed tissue paper decorations and products.

Beistle founded the Beistle Company in 1900 in Pittsburgh, Pennsylvania in the basement of his home, where he made artificial flowers and wooden products, and the company's facilities soon expanded to the small town of Oakville, Pennsylvania. The company was incorporated in 1907, and its manufacturing center was moved to the second floor of a wagon shop. The company then expanded further, eventually moving to larger facilities in Shippensburg, Pennsylvania. In 1910, Beistle imported the technology to produce honeycomb tissue—which was previously only available in Europe and Asia, with Germany serving as a popular source for such materials—to the United States. Beistle also acquired numerous patents, adding to the company's success.

In the 1920s, Beistle partnered with the Paper Novelty Company to create a variety of paper decorations for holidays such as Valentine's Day, Easter, Halloween, Thanksgiving, and Christmas, with the Halloween decorations being the first seasonal decorations to be added to Beistle's catalog. In the late 1920s and early 1930s, the Beistle Company released fortune-telling games as entertainment for Halloween parties, and these games have since become popular with collectors. Beistle has produced over 1,000 different Halloween-themed designs and decorations since the line was first introduced, and the inexpensiveness and availability of the products helped to popularize Halloween decoration in the U.S. Creepy Company, founded in 2015, has produced apparel, enamel pins, and other products based on Beistle designs under the company's license.

Martin Luther Beistle died in 1935, and passed ownership of the company on to his son-in-law Henry E. Luhrs and his family.

== In popular culture ==
In 2017, the American heavy metal band Acid Witch released the song "Mr. Beistle", which makes references to Martin Luther Beistle and the Beistle Company, on their album Evil Sound Screamers.
