= Shippensburg, Pennsylvania =

Borough in Pennsylvania, US

- Borough
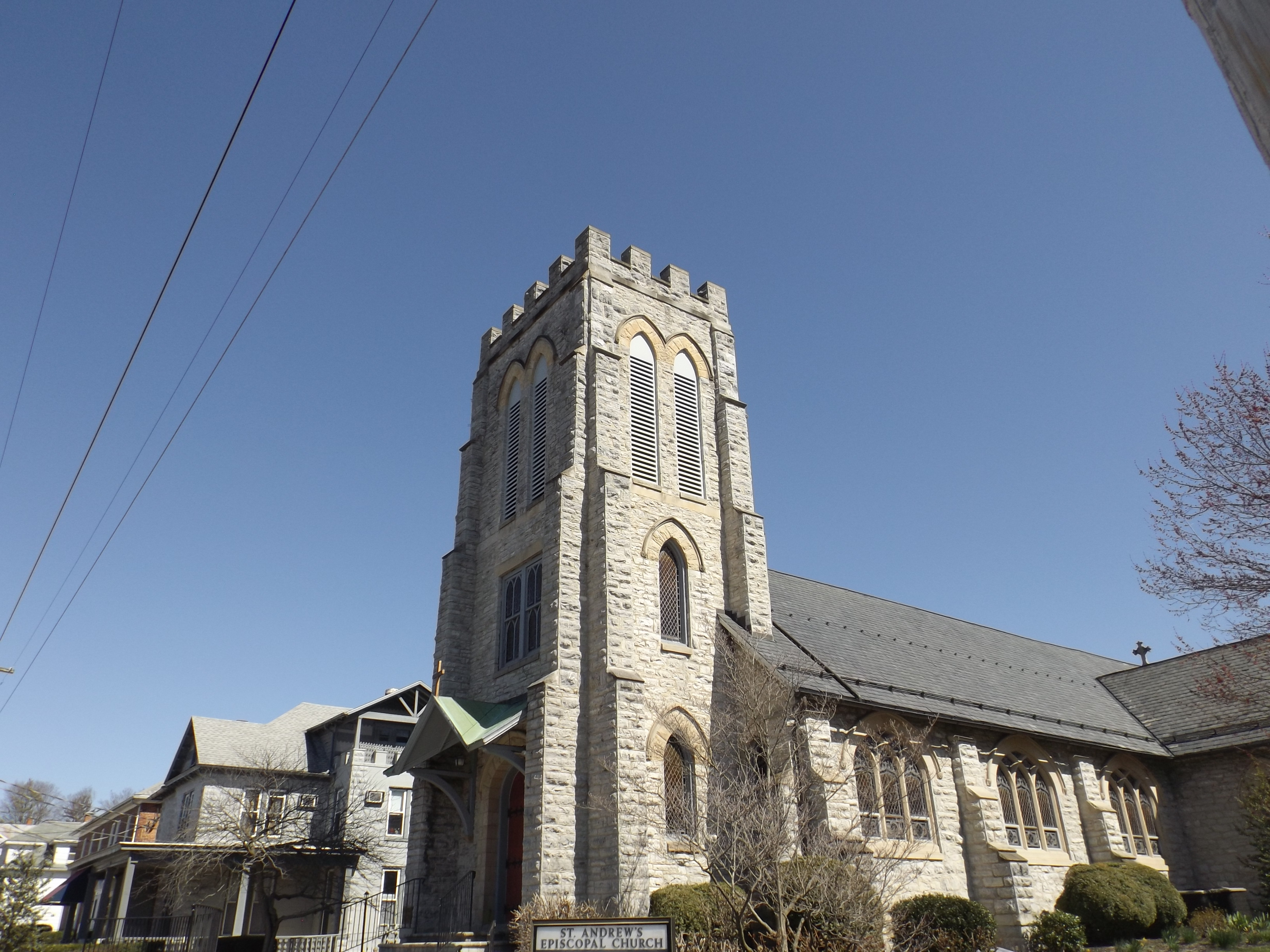
- St. Andrew's Episcopal Church in Shippensburg

- Location of Shippensburg in Cumberland County, Pennsylvania.

- Location in Pennsylvania and the United States Shippensburg (the United States)
- Coordinates: 40°03′12″N 77°30′26″W
- Country: United States
- State: Pennsylvania
- Counties: Cumberland and Franklin
- Settled: 1730
- Incorporated: 1819

Government
  - Type: Borough Council
  - Mayor: Kathy Coy

Area
  - Total: 2.03 sq mi (5.26 km^{2})
  - Land: 2.03 sq mi (5.25 km^{2})
  - Water: 0.0039 sq mi (0.01 km^{2})
- Elevation: 646 ft (197 m)

Population (2020)
  - Total: 5,478
  - Estimate (2019): 5,565
  - Density: 2,743.8/sq mi (1,059.39/km^{2})
- Time zone: UTC-5 (Eastern (EST))
  - Summer (DST): UTC-4 (EDT)
- ZIP code: 17257
- Area code: 717
- FIPS code: 42-70352
- GNIS feature ID: 1217325
- Website: www.borough.shippensburg.pa.us

Pennsylvania Historical Marker
- Designated: June 01, 1948

Shippensburg is a borough in Cumberland and Franklin counties in the U.S. Commonwealth of Pennsylvania. Settled in 1730, Shippensburg lies in the Cumberland Valley, 41 miles (66 km) southwest of Harrisburg, and is part of the Harrisburg metropolitan area. The population was 5,478 at the 2020 census.

Shippensburg was incorporated as a borough on January 21, 1819. In the past, there were furniture factories, engine and pump works, and other industrial works located within the town. Shippensburg is the home of the Beistle Company, the oldest manufacturer of decorations and party goods in the U.S. In May 2012, Volvo Construction Equipment began a $100 million expansion project to bring its American headquarters to Shippensburg.

Shippensburg University of Pennsylvania, one of 14 universities of the Pennsylvania State System of Higher Education, is located just north of the borough limits in Shippensburg Township.

== History ==
Shippensburg is the oldest community of the Cumberland Valley, and the second oldest west of the Susquehanna River in Pennsylvania (after York to the east). In July 1730, 12 Scots-Irish families came to the site of the present-day Shippensburg and built cabin homes along Burd's Run. Shippensburg began as the western outpost of colonial settlement.

The village received its name from Edward Shippen, a prominent resident of Lancaster (and onetime mayor of Philadelphia) who obtained the patent to the land from the heirs of William Penn. Edward Shippen's granddaughter, Peggy Shippen, was historically notable as the wife of General Benedict Arnold, who betrayed the Continental Army by defecting to the British during the American Revolutionary War.

In 1735, Samuel Perry built the Widow Piper's Tavern, which stands at the southwest corner of East King Street and Queen Street. This building was selected as the place for the first Cumberland County Courts in 1750 and 1751. The building has been restored and serves today as the home of the Shippensburg Civic Club.

On July 9, 1755, Edward Morris, the governor of Shippensburg, ordered that a fort be built after he learned of General Braddock's defeat at the hands of the French and Indians. His intent was to provide protection for the troops and colonists during the French and Indian War. Over the next year, several buildings, a 70-foot-deep (21 m) well, and a log palisade were built. Fort Morris was garrisoned until 1759 but preserved for several more years due to the efforts of Edward Shippen. There is also a record that an officer and eighteen provincial troops were stationed in Shippensburg during the winter of 1763–1764. On March 24, 1761, Shippen wrote, "I desire everybody in Shippensburg to take care of ye Fort for I will suffer a log of it to be thrown down on any pretense whatever."

Shippensburg University of Pennsylvania was founded in 1871 as a normal school.

In 2009, a team of archaeologists reported they had discovered the site of Fort Morris on Burd Street. Among the artifacts found were pottery, coins, buttons, musket balls, flints and musket parts. Some of these artifacts are housed in Shearer Hall on the Shippensburg University campus, while others are currently on display at the Shippensburg Historical Society.

The Shippensburg Historic District, Dykeman's Spring, the Benjamin Blythe Homestead, Cumberland Valley State Normal School Historic District, the Shippen House, and Widow Piper's Tavern are listed on the National Register of Historic Places.

== Geography ==
Shippensburg is located in south-central Pennsylvania primarily in Cumberland County, but extending west into Franklin County.

U.S. Route 11 passes through the center of town as King Street; US 11 leads northeast 20 miles (32 km) to Carlisle, the Cumberland County seat, and southwest 11 miles (18 km) to Chambersburg, the Franklin County seat. Pennsylvania Route 696 leads north out of Shippensburg as Earl Street and south as Fayette Street. Via PA 696, it is 6 miles (10 km) north to Newburg and 3 miles (5 km) south to Exit 24 on Interstate 81. Pennsylvania Route 533 leads west out of town as Morris Street, 5 miles (8 km) to Orrstown. Pennsylvania Route 174 (Walnut Bottom Road) split east from US 11 at the east edge of the borough, leading 1.5 miles (2.4 km) to Exit 29 on Interstate 81 and 6 miles (10 km) to the village of Walnut Bottom in South Newton Township.

According to the U.S. Census Bureau, the borough of Shippensburg has a total area of 2.0 square miles (5.2 km^{2}), of which 0.004 square miles (0.01 km^{2}), or 0.18%, is water. Gum Run flows through the center of town, entering from the south and becoming Middle Spring Creek, a northward-flowing tributary of Conodoguinet Creek and part of the Susquehanna River watershed. Outside the town, the area consists of mostly field and pasture, some forest, few streams and water holes.

=== Climate ===
Climate data for Shippensburg, Pennsylvania (1991–2020 normals, extremes 1911–present)
Month	Jan	Feb	Mar	Apr	May	Jun	Jul	Aug	Sep	Oct	Nov	Dec	Year
Record high °F (°C)	71 (22)	82 (28)	87 (31)	94 (34)	97 (36)	101 (38)	105 (41)	102 (39)	104 (40)	95 (35)	83 (28)	75 (24)	105 (41)
Mean daily maximum °F (°C)	38.3 (3.5)	42.0 (5.6)	51.4 (10.8)	64.2 (17.9)	74.2 (23.4)	82.9 (28.3)	87.4 (30.8)	85.3 (29.6)	77.7 (25.4)	65.8 (18.8)	53.4 (11.9)	42.3 (5.7)	63.7 (17.6)
Daily mean °F (°C)	30.2 (−1.0)	32.9 (0.5)	41.0 (5.0)	52.5 (11.4)	62.5 (16.9)	71.3 (21.8)	75.7 (24.3)	73.7 (23.2)	66.2 (19.0)	54.8 (12.7)	43.7 (6.5)	34.5 (1.4)	53.2 (11.8)
Mean daily minimum °F (°C)	22.1 (−5.5)	23.8 (−4.6)	30.7 (−0.7)	40.8 (4.9)	50.7 (10.4)	59.6 (15.3)	64.0 (17.8)	62.1 (16.7)	54.7 (12.6)	43.7 (6.5)	34.0 (1.1)	26.6 (−3.0)	42.7 (5.9)
Record low °F (°C)	−16 (−27)	−10 (−23)	−1 (−18)	15 (−9)	27 (−3)	38 (3)	45 (7)	38 (3)	29 (−2)	20 (−7)	3 (−16)	−8 (−22)	−16 (−27)
Average precipitation inches (mm)	3.17 (81)	2.66 (68)	3.70 (94)	3.64 (92)	4.01 (102)	4.00 (102)	3.98 (101)	3.34 (85)	4.32 (110)	3.33 (85)	2.98 (76)	3.36 (85)	42.49 (1,079)
Average snowfall inches (cm)	9.8 (25)	10.3 (26)	6.7 (17)	0.4 (1.0)	0.0 (0.0)	0.0 (0.0)	0.0 (0.0)	0.0 (0.0)	0.0 (0.0)	0.2 (0.51)	0.8 (2.0)	5.4 (14)	33.6 (85)
Average precipitation days (≥ 0.01 in)	10.9	9.8	10.7	11.6	13.2	11.7	10.5	10.0	9.5	9.3	8.9	9.8	125.9
Average snowy days (≥ 0.1 in)	5.2	4.9	2.6	0.2	0.0	0.0	0.0	0.0	0.0	0.1	0.8	2.6	16.4
Source: NOAA

== Demographics ==
Historical population
Census	Pop.	Note	%±
1810	1,159		—
1820	1,247		7.6%
1830	1,621		30.0%
1840	1,473		−9.1%
1850	1,568		6.4%
1860	1,843		17.5%
1870	2,065		12.0%
1880	2,213		7.2%
1890	2,188		−1.1%
1900	3,228		47.5%
1910	3,457		7.1%
1920	4,372		26.5%
1930	4,345		−0.6%
1940	5,244		20.7%
1950	5,722		9.1%
1960	6,138		7.3%
1970	6,536		6.5%
1980	5,261		−19.5%
1990	5,531		5.1%
2000	5,586		1.0%
2010	5,492		−1.7%
2020	5,478		−0.3%

As of the census of 2000, there were 5,586 people, 2,397 households, and 1,138 families residing in the borough. The population density was 2,772.0 inhabitants per square mile (1,070.3/km^{2}). There were 2,602 housing units at an average density of 1,291.2 units per square mile (498.5 units/km^{2}). The racial makeup of the borough was 94.16% White, 3.44% African American, 0.11% Native American, 0.98% Asian, 0.02% Pacific Islander, 0.47% from other races, and 0.82% from two or more races. Hispanic or Latino of any race were 1.15% of the population.

There were 2,397 households, out of which 20.9% had children under the age of 18 living with them, 34.5% were married couples living together, 9.9% had a female householder with no husband present, and 52.5% were non-families. 33.4% of all households were made up of individuals, and 15.1% had someone living alone who was 65 years of age or older. The average household size was 2.32 and the average family size was 2.87.

In the borough the population was spread out, with 17.6% under the age of 18, 28.5% from 18 to 24, 21.8% from 25 to 44, 16.4% from 45 to 64, and 15.6% who were 65 years of age or older. The median age was 28 years. For every 100 females, there were 85.3 males. For every 100 females age 18 and over, there were 82.5 males.

The median income for a household in the borough was $27,660, and the median income for a family was $39,896. Males had a median income of $29,387 versus $21,775 for females. The per capita income for the borough was $14,816. About 9.4% of families and 28.6% of the population were below the poverty line, including 19.6% of those under age 18 and 10.9% of those age 65 or over.

== Festivals ==
Yearly, in the last full week of July, the Shippensburg Community Fair is held. Begun in 1958, the fair bills itself as Pennsylvania's largest bi-county fair. The fair includes agricultural exhibits, a craft show, food vendors, and carnival rides amongst other things.

Every summer on the last Saturday of August, Shippensburg holds the Corn Festival, an event that brings regional artisans and vendors to operate stands downtown. The downtown is closed to traffic for at least 5 blocks for most of the day. Average attendance at the festival is estimated at 60,000 - 70,000 each year. In 2021, the Corn Festival was held at the Shippensburg Fairgrounds.

== Education ==
The borough is served by the Shippensburg Area School District.

Shippensburg University of Pennsylvania is in the area, with a portion of the university property in the borough.

== Notable people ==
- sujatha baliga, Director of the Restorative Justice Project and MacArthur Fellow
- Andy Enfield, head men's basketball coach, Southern Methodist University
- John Hamilton, starred as Perry White on the Adventures of Superman TV series of the 1950s
- Thomas "Doc" Martin, historic physician of Taos, New Mexico
- William W. McCammon, Medal of Honor recipient from the American Civil War.
- Andrew G. Miller (1811–1880) Pennsylvania State Senator from 1869 to 1871.
- Edward Shippen III, mayor of Philadelphia, founding member of Princeton University
- Samuel D. Sturgis, Union Army general and namesake of Sturgis, South Dakota.

== See also ==
- Peebles Homestead, a historic Revolutionary War era homestead located in Shippensburg
