= 2018 NCAA Division II baseball tournament =

- Season: 2018
- Teams: 56
- Finals site: USA Baseball National Training Complex; Cary, North Carolina
- Champions: Augustana (SD) (1st title)
- Runner-up: Columbus State (8th CWS Appearance)
- Winning coach: Tim Huber (1st title)

The 2018 NCAA Division II baseball tournament decided the champion of baseball in NCAA Division II for the 2018 season. The Augustana Vikings of South Dakota claimed their first national title. In the final, Augustana defeated the Columbus State Cougars. The Cougars made their eighth appearance in the College World Series, having won the event in 2002 and two other times finished as runner up.

== Regionals ==
=== Atlantic Regional–Millersville, Pennsylvania ===
Hosted by Millersville at Bennett J. Cooper Park.

Upper round 1 | Upper round 2 | Upper final | Final
1 | West Chester | 2
5 | Mercyhurst | 3
4 | Bloomsburg | 0
5 | Mercyhurst | 5
5 | Mercyhurst | 7^{11}
6 | Seton Hill | 6
3 | Shepherd | 0
6 | Seton Hill | 4
6 | Seton Hill | 9
7 | Charleston | 0
2 | Millersville | 0
7 | Charleston | 3
5 | Mercyhurst | 4 | —
6 | Seton Hill | 0 | —
Lower round 1 | Lower round 2 | Lower round 3 | Lower final
1 | West Chester | 6
3 | Shepherd | 3 | 2 | Millersville | 7 | 6 | Seton Hill | 5
2 | Millersville | 5^{11} | 2 | Millersville | 17 | 2 | Millersville | 0
7 | Charleston | 8
4 | Bloomsburg | 4
7 | Charleston | 6

=== Central Regional–Magnolia, Arkansas ===
Hosted by Southern Arkansas at Goodheart Field at Walker Stadium.

Upper round 1 | Upper round 2 | Upper final | Final
1 | Southern Arkansas | 6
8 | Emporia State | 8
8 | Emporia State | 2
5 | Augustana (SD) | 4
4 | Pittsburg State | 4
5 | Augustana (SD) | 9
5 | Augustana (SD) | 9
2 | Central Missouri | 6
3 | Central Oklahoma | 2
6 | St. Cloud State | 5
6 | St. Cloud State | 0
2 | Central Missouri | 15
2 | Central Missouri | 10
7 | Oklahoma Baptist | 2 | 5 | Augustana (SD) | 3 | 6
1 | Southern Arkansas | 5 | 3
Lower round 1 | Lower round 2 | Lower round 3 | Lower final
6 | St. Cloud State | 5
1 | Southern Arkansas | 5 | 1 | Southern Arkansas | 11 | 2 | Central Missouri | 6
4 | Pittsburg State | 1 | 1 | Southern Arkansas | 10 | 1 | Southern Arkansas | 11
3 | Central Oklahoma | 5
8 | Emporia State | 1
3 | Central Oklahoma | 4 | 3 | Central Oklahoma | 4
7 | Oklahoma Baptist | 1

=== East Regional–New Haven, Connecticut ===
Hosted by New Haven at Frank Vieira Field.

Upper round 1 | Upper round 2 | Upper final | Final
1 | New Haven | 1
4 | Southern New Hampshire | 7
4 | Southern New Hampshire | 7
5 | Franklin Pierce | 2
4 | Southern New Hampshire | 8
2 | St. Thomas Aquinas | 1
3 | Le Moyne | 3
6 | Merrimack | 2
3 | Le Moyne | 1
2 | St. Thomas Aquinas | 5
2 | St. Thomas Aquinas | 8
7 | Wilmington (DE) | 3
4 | Southern New Hampshire | 6 | —
2 | St. Thomas Aquinas | 0 | —
Lower round 1 | Lower round 2 | Lower round 3 | Lower final
1 | New Haven | 1
6 | Merrimack | 5 | 7 | Wilmington (DE) | 0 | 2 | St. Thomas Aquinas | 4
7 | Wilmington (DE) | 10 | 1 | New Haven | 5 | 1 | New Haven | 0
5 | Franklin Pierce | 4
5 | Franklin Pierce | 6
3 | Le Moyne | 2

=== Midwest Regional–Springfield, Illinois ===
Hosted by UIS at UIS Baseball Field.

Round 1 | Round 2 | Quarterfinals | Final
1 | UIS | 11
8 | Hillsdale | 2
1 | UIS | 11
5 | Quincy | 7
4 | Ohio Dominican | 3
5 | Quincy | 8
1 | UIS | 1
7 | Southern Indiana | 13
3 | Northwood | 5
6 | Ashland | 10
6 | Ashland | 3
7 | Southern Indiana | 11
2 | Bellarmine | 7
7 | Southern Indiana | 9^{12} | 7 | Southern Indiana | 9 | —
4 | Ohio Dominican | 7 | —
Lower round 1 | Lower round 2 | Lower round 3 | Lower final
6 | Ashland | 7
8 | Hillsdale | 3 | 4 | Ohio Dominican | 13 | 1 | UIS | 12
4 | Ohio Dominican | 4 | 4 | Ohio Dominican | 10 | 4 | Ohio Dominican | 14
5 | Quincy | 4
5 | Quincy | 9
3 | Northwood | 1 | 2 | Bellarmine | 3
2 | Bellarmine | 6

=== South Regional–Lakeland, Florida ===
Hosted by Florida Southern at Henley Field.

Round 1 | Round 2 | Quarterfinals | Final
1 | Florida Southern | 5
4 | Nova Southeastern | 1
4 | Nova Southeastern | 12
5 | Montevallo | 7
1 | Florida Southern | 4
2 | Tampa | 2
3 | Delta State | 13
6 | Mississippi College | 3
3 | Delta State | 0
2 | Tampa | 3
2 | Tampa | 12
7 | Albany State | 2
1 | Florida Southern | 8 | —
2 | Tampa | 7 | —
Lower round 1 | Lower round 2 | Lower round 3 | Lower final
4 | Nova Southeastern | 3
6 | Mississippi College | 6 | 6 | Mississippi College | 5 | 2 | Tampa | 7
7 | Albany State | 3 | 6 | Mississippi College | 7 | 6 | Mississippi College | 1
3 | Delta State | 4
3 | Delta State | 9
5 | Montevallo | 2

=== Southeast Regional–Tigerville, South Carolina ===
Hosted by North Greenville at Ashmore Field.

Round 1 | Round 2 | Quarterfinals | Final
1 | North Greenville | 3
4 | Columbus State | 4
4 | Columbus State | 8
5 | UNC Pembroke | 2
4 | Columbus State | 3
3 | Belmont Abbey | 7
3 | Belmont Abbey | 5
6 | Wingate | 4
3 | Belmont Abbey | 15
7 | Lincoln Memorial | 3
2 | Georgia College | 4
7 | Lincoln Memorial | 9
3 | Belmont Abbey | 0 | 7
4 | Columbus State | 5 | 10
Lower round 1 | Lower round 2 | Lower round 3 | Lower final
1 | North Greenville | 10
6 | Wingate | 3 | 2 | Georgia College | 6 | 4 | Columbus State | 6
2 | Georgia College | 13 | 1 | North Greenville | 2 | 1 | North Greenville | 3
4 | UNC Pembroke | 0
7 | Lincoln Memorial | 8
4 | UNC Pembroke | 9

=== South Central Regional–Canyon, Texas ===
Hosted by West Texas A&M at Wilder Park.

Round 1
1 | West Texas A&M | 7
6 | Tarleton State | 2
3 | St. Edward's | 3
4 | Colorado Mines | 11
2 | Colorado Mesa | 10
5 | Texas A&M–Kingsville | 13

Round 2
1 | West Texas A&M | 3
3 | St. Edward's | 13
2 | Colorado Mesa | 3^{11}
6 | Tarleton State | 2
4 | Colorado Mines | 9^{11}
5 | Texas A&M–Kingsville | 7
1 | West Texas A&M | 1
5 | Texas A&M–Kingsville | 2^{10}

Quarterfinals
3 | St. Edward's | 7
2 | Colorado Mesa | 8^{12}
4 | Colorado Mines | 2
5 | Texas A&M–Kingsville | 5

Semifinals
2 | Colorado Mesa | 11^{11}
4 | Colorado Mines | 4

Final
2 | Colorado Mesa | 5
5 | Texas A&M–Kingsville | 12

=== West Region–Azusa, California ===
Hosted by Azusa Pacific at Cougar Baseball Field.

First round
1 | Cal State Monterey Bay | 10
6 | Cal State Chico | 7
3 | UC San Diego | 22
4 | Point Loma Nazarene | 3
2 | Azusa Pacific | 4
5 | California Baptist | 7^{15}

Second round
1 | Cal State Monterey Bay | 12
4 | Point Loma Nazarene | 13
6 | Cal State Chico | 3
2 | Azusa Pacific | 17
3 | UC San Diego | 9
5 | California Baptist | 8
1 | Cal State Monterey Bay | 10
5 | California Baptist | 17

Third round
4 | Point Loma Nazarene | 7
2 | Azusa Pacific | 10
3 | UC San Diego | 5
5 | California Baptist | 3

Final
2 | Azusa Pacific | 7 | —
3 | UC San Diego | 8 | —

== College World Series ==
=== Participants ===
| School | Conference | Record (conference) | Head coach | Previous CWS appearances | Best CWS finish |
|---|---|---|---|---|---|
| Augustana (SD) | Northern Sun | 48–9 (26–8) | Tim Huber | 0 (Last: never) | N/A |
| Columbus State | Peach Belt | 45–13 (20–9) | Greg Appleton | 7 (Last: 2007) | 1st |
| Florida Southern | Sunshine State | 42–9–1 (22–8) | Lance Niekro | 20 (Last: 2005) | 1st |
| Mercyhurst | PSAC | 36–13 (20–8) | Joe Spano | 1 (Last: 2015) | 5th |
| Southern Indiana | Great Lakes Valley | 36–21–1 (15–9) | Tracy Archuleta | 5 (Last: 2016) | 1st |
| Southern New Hampshire | Northeast-10 | 39–15 (19–6) | Scott Loiseau | 1 (Last: 2012) | 5th |
| Texas A&M–Kingsville | Lone Star | 41–15 (15–9) | Jason Gonzales | 0 (Last: never) | N/A |
| UC San Diego | CCAA | 45–15 (30–14) | Eric Newman | 3 (Last: 2017) | 2nd |

=== Results ===
==== Bracket ====
All Games Played at USA Baseball National Training Complex in Cary, North Carolina

First round
1 | Florida Southern | 5
8 | Southern Indiana | 3
4 | Southern New Hampshire | 2
5 | Augustana (SD) | 5
8 | Southern Indiana | 0
4 | Southern New Hampshire | 3
3 | UC San Diego | 3
6 | Texas A&M–Kingsville | 0
2 | Columbus State | 8
7 | Mercyhurst | 1
6 | Texas A&M–Kingsville | 9
7 | Mercyhurst | 0

Second round
1 | Florida Southern | 5
5 | Augustana (SD) | 6
3 | UC San Diego | 4
4 | Southern New Hampshire | 7
3 | UC San Diego | 0
2 | Columbus State | 6
1 | Florida Southern | 8
6 | Texas A&M–Kingsville | 0

Semifinals
5 | Augustana (SD) | 8 | —
4 | Southern New Hampshire | 2 | —
2 | Columbus State | 2 | 11
1 | Florida Southern | 3 | 6

Final
5 | Augustana (SD) | 3
2 | Columbus State | 2

==== Game results ====
| Date | Game | Winner | Score | Loser | Notes |
|---|---|---|---|---|---|
| May 26 | Game 1 | Augustana (SD) | 5–2 | Southern New Hampshire | |
| May 26 | Game 2 | Florida Southern | 5–3 | Southern Indiana | |
| May 27 | Game 3 | UC San Diego | 3–0 | Texas A&M–Kingsville | |
| May 27 | Game 4 | Columbus State | 8–1 | Mercyhurst | |
| May 27 | Game 5 | Southern New Hampshire | 3–0 | Southern Indiana | Southern Indiana eliminated |
| May 27 | Game 6 | Augustana (SD) | 6–5 | Florida Southern | |
| May 29 | Game 7 | Texas A&M–Kingsville | 9–0 | Mercyhurst | Mercyhurst eliminated |
| May 29 | Game 8 | Columbus State | 6–0 | UC San Diego | |
| May 30 | Game 9 | Florida Southern | 8–0 | Texas A&M–Kingsville | Texas A&M–Kingsville eliminated |
| May 30 | Game 10 | Southern New Hampshire | 7–4 | UC San Diego | UC San Diego eliminated |
| May 31 | Game 11 | Augustana (SD) | 8–2 | Southern New Hampshire | Southern New Hampshire eliminated |
| June 1 | Game 12 | Columbus State | 11–6 | Florida Southern | Florida Southern eliminated |
| June 2 | Game 13 | Augustana (SD) | 3–2 | Columbus State | Augustana wins National Championship |
