= 2016 NCAA Division II baseball tournament =

Baseball tournament for the 2016 season

- Season: 2016
- Teams: 56
- Finals site: USA Baseball National Training Complex; Cary, North Carolina
- Champions: Nova Southeastern (1st title)
- Runner-up: Millersville (1st CWS Appearance)
- Winning coach: Greg Brown (1st title)
- MOP: Kevin Suarez (Nova Southeastern)

The 2016 NCAA Division II baseball tournament decided the champion of baseball in NCAA Division II for the 2016 season. the Nova Southeastern Sharks won their first national championship, beating the Millersville Marauders, both teams in their first College World Series. Nova Southeastern coach Greg Brown won his first title with the team, while NSU outfielder Kevin Suarez was named Tournament MOP.

== Regionals ==
=== Atlantic Regional–West Chester, PA ===
Hosted by West Chester at Serpico Stadium.

Upper round 1	Upper round 2	Upper final	Final
1	Millersville	2
5	Seton Hill	1
4	Shepherd	0
5	Seton Hill	3
1	Millersville	6
3	Mercyhurst	3
3	Mercyhurst	6
6	East Stroudsburg	3
3	Mercyhurst	6
2	West Chester	1
2	West Chester	12
7	Chowan	6
1	Millersville	6	—
3	Mercyhurst	2	—
Lower round 1	Lower round 2	Lower round 3	Lower final
5	Seton Hill	0
6	East Stroudsburg	19	6	East Stroudsburg	3	3	Mercyhurst	4
7	Chowan	2	6	East Stroudsburg	1	4	Shepherd	1
4	Shepherd	3
2	West Chester	2
4	Shepherd	4

=== Central Regional–St. Cloud, MN ===
Hosted by St. Cloud State at Joe Faber Field.

Upper round 1	Upper round 2	Upper final	Final
1	St. Cloud State	0
8	Minnesota State	1^{11}
8	Minnesota State	7
4	Arkansas–Monticello	6
4	Arkansas–Monticello	15
5	Missouri Western	0
8	Minnesota State	0
2	Central Missouri	3
3	Minnesota–Duluth	0
6	Emporia State	4
6	Emporia State	3
2	Central Missouri	6
2	Central Missouri	3
7	Southwestern Oklahoma State	1	2	Central Missouri	7	—
4	Arkansas–Monticello	4	—
Lower round 1	Lower round 2	Lower round 3	Lower final
6	Emporia State	6
1	St. Cloud State	10	1	St. Cloud State	4	8	Minnesota State	6
5	Missouri Western	4	6	Emporia State	7	4	Arkansas–Monticello	13
4	Arkansas–Monticello	18
4	Arkansas–Monticello	2^{10}
3	Minnesota–Duluth	3	7	Southwestern Oklahoma State	1
7	Southwestern Oklahoma State	6

=== East Regional–Nashua, NH ===
Hosted by Franklin Pierce at Holman Stadium.

Upper round 1	Upper round 2	Upper final	Final
1	Franklin Pierce	18
4	Felician	0
4	Felician	3
5	Bridgeport	0
1	Franklin Pierce	12
3	St. Thomas Aquinas	8
3	St. Thomas Aquinas	5
6	Molloy	2
3	St. Thomas Aquinas	4
7	Dowling	0
2	Southern New Hampshire	0
7	Dowling	4
1	Franklin Pierce	3	6
2	Southern New Hampshire	4	3
Lower round 1	Lower round 2	Lower round 3	Lower final
4	Felician	5
6	Molloy	5	2	Southern New Hampshire	20	3	St. Thomas Aquinas	4
2	Southern New Hampshire	11	2	Southern New Hampshire	5	2	Southern New Hampshire	10
5	Bridgeport	2
7	Dowling	6
5	Bridgeport	7

=== Midwest Regional–Quincy, IL ===
Hosted by Quincy at Quincy University Baseball Stadium.

Upper round 1	Upper round 2	Upper final	Final
1	Quincy	20
8	Alderson Broaddus	0
1	Quincy	5
4	Southern Indiana	9
4	Southern Indiana	7
5	Missouri S&T	5
4	Southern Indiana	13
6	Ashland	8
3	Indianapolis	1
6	Ashland	8
6	Ashland	4
2	Grand Valley State	3
2	Grand Valley State	9
7	Hillsdale	8	4	Southern Indiana	10	—
5	Missouri S&T	5	—
Lower round 1	Lower round 2	Lower round 3	Lower final
2	Grand Valley State	1
8	Alderson Broaddus	1	5	Missouri S&T	2	6	Ashland	4
5	Missouri S&T	9	5	Missouri S&T	9	5	Missouri S&T	12
1	Quincy	8
1	Quincy	5
3	Indianapolis	4	3	Indianapolis	1
7	Hillsdale	1

=== South Regional–Tampa, FL ===
Hosted by Tampa at Tampa University Baseball Stadium.

Upper round 1	Upper round 2	Upper final	Final
1	Tampa	5
4	Delta State	7
4	Delta State	6
5	Lynn	1
4	Delta State	4
3	Nova Southeastern	9
3	Nova Southeastern	11
6	West Georgia	4
3	Nova Southeastern	6
2	West Florida	4
2	West Florida	17
7	Claflin	1
3	Nova Southeastern	1	3
4	Delta State	3	1
Lower round 1	Lower round 2	Lower round 3	Lower final
1	Tampa	3
6	West Georgia	7	6	West Georgia	4	4	Delta State	3
7	Claflin	0	2	West Florida	6	6	West Georgia	5
6	West Georgia	7
2	West Florida	11
5	Lynn	5

=== Southeast Regional–Columbus, GA ===
Hosted by Columbus State at Ragsdale Field.

Upper round 1	Upper round 2	Upper final	Final
1	Columbus State	5
4	USC Aiken	8^{10}
4	USC Aiken	2
5	Tusculum	1
4	USC Aiken	0
2	Lander	3
3	Belmont Abbey	6^{12}
6	Catawba	5
3	Belmont Abbey	4
2	Lander	11
2	Lander	6
7	Mount Olive	4
2	Lander	5	—
4	USC Aiken	3	—
Lower round 1	Lower round 2	Lower round 3	Lower final
1	Columbus State	2
6	Catawba	4	7	Mount Olive	7	4	USC Aiken	8
7	Mount Olive	6	7	Mount Olive	2	5	Tusculum	2
5	Tusculum	3
3	Belmont Abbey	1
5	Tusculum	7

=== South Central Regional–Grand Junction, CO ===
Hosted by Colorado Mesa at Suplizio Field.

First round
1	Colorado Mesa	6
6	Lubbock Christian	8
3	Angelo State	4
4	West Texas A&M	1
2	St. Edward's	8
5	Texas A&M–Kingsville	4

Second round
6	Lubbock Christian	4
4	West Texas A&M	2
3	Angelo State	6
2	St. Edward's	4
1	Colorado Mesa	6
5	Texas A&M–Kingsville	7

Third round
6	Lubbock Christian	2
3	Angelo State	6
2	St. Edward's	7
5	Texas A&M–Kingsville	5

Semifinals
6	Lubbock Christian	5
2	St. Edward's	10

Final
3	Angelo State	9	—
2	St. Edward's	2	—

=== West Regional–Riverside, CA ===
Hosted by California Baptist at Riverside Sports Complex.

First round
1	California Baptist	14
6	Cal State East Bay	0
3	Cal Poly Pomona	11
4	Chico State	1
2	Dixie State	3
5	Cal State Monterey Bay	6

Second round
1	California Baptist	12
4	Chico State	3
3	Cal Poly Pomona	14
5	Cal State Monterey Bay	2
2	Dixie State	6
6	Cal State East Bay	4

Third round
1	California Baptist	5
3	Cal Poly Pomona	6
5	Cal State Monterey Bay	4
2	Dixie State	7

Semifinals
1	California Baptist	8
2	Dixie State	6

Final
3	Cal Poly Pomona	7	—
1	California Baptist	6	—

== College World Series ==
=== Participants ===
School	Conference	Record (conference)	Head coach	Previous CWS appearances	Best CWS finish
Angelo State	Lone Star	39–20 (25–10)	Kevin Brooks	2 (Last: 2015)	5th
Cal Poly Pomona	CCAA	39–16 (26–11)	Randy Betten	6 (Last: 2015)	1st
Central Missouri	MIAA	42–13 (32–7)	Kyle Crookes	16 (Last: 2011)	1st
Franklin Pierce	Northeast-10	48–7 (25–2)	Jayson King	6 (Last: 2013)	3rd
Lander	Peach Belt	42–14 (23–7)	Kermit Smith	1 (Last: 2014)	5th
Millersville	PSAC	50–5 (25–3)	Jon Shehan	2 (Last: 2011)	5th
Nova Southeastern	Sunshine State	39–16 (18–6)	Greg Brown	0 (Last: never)	N/A
Southern Indiana	Great Lakes Valley	37–19 (20–8)	Tracy Archuleta	4 (Last: 2014)	1st

=== Results ===
==== Bracket ====
Hosted by Mount Olive and Town of Cary at USA Baseball National Training Complex in Cary, NC.

First round
Angelo State	0
Millersville	1
Cal Poly Pomona	2^{10}
Southern Indiana	1
Angelo State	0
Southern Indiana	1
Nova Southeastern	4^{12}
Franklin Pierce	3
Lander	4
Central Missouri	3
Franklin Pierce	0
Central Missouri	6

Second round
Millersville	11
Cal Poly Pomona	3
Lander	4
Southern Indiana	2
Nova Southeastern	12
Lander	1
Cal Poly Pomona	3
Central Missouri	0

Semifinals
Millersville	4	—
Lander	2	—
Nova Southeastern	5	—
Cal Poly Pomona	2	—

Finals
Millersville	1	6	—
Nova Southeastern	2	8	—

==== Game results ====
Date	Game	Winner	Score	Loser	Notes
May 28	Game 1	Millersville	1–0	Angelo State	
May 28	Game 2	Cal Poly Pomona	2–1 (10)	Southern Indiana	
May 28	Game 3	Nova Southeastern	4–3 (12)	Franklin Pierce	
May 28	Game 4	Lander	4–3	Central Missouri	
May 30	Game 5	Southern Indiana	1–0	Angelo State	Angelo State eliminated
May 30	Game 6	Millersville	11–3	Cal Poly Pomona	
May 31	Game 7	Central Missouri	6–0	Franklin Pierce	Franklin Pierce eliminated
May 31	Game 8	Nova Southeastern	12–1	Lander	
June 1	Game 9	Cal Poly Pomona	3–0	Central Missouri	Central Missouri eliminated
June 1	Game 10	Lander	4–2	Southern Indiana	Southern Indiana eliminated
June 2	Game 11	Nova Southeastern	5–2	Cal Poly Pomona	Cal Poly Pomona eliminated
June 2	Game 12	Millersville	4–2	Lander	Lander eliminated
June 3	Game 13	Nova Southeastern	2–1	Millersville	
June 4	Game 14	Nova Southeastern	8–6	Millersville	Nova Southeastern wins National Championship
