= NCAA Division II baseball tournament =

Annual baseball tournament

- Current season, competition or edition: 2026 NCAA Division II baseball tournament
- Association: NCAA
- Sport: College baseball
- Founded: 1968; 58 years ago
- Division: Division II
- No. of teams: 56
- Country: United States; Canada
- Most recent champion: Tampa (11th title)
- Most titles: Tampa (11)
- Website: NCAA.com

The NCAA Division II baseball tournament (formerly known as the NCAA College Division baseball tournament) is an annual college baseball tournament held at the culmination of the spring regular season and which determines the NCAA Division II college baseball champion.

The initial rounds of the tournament are held on campus sites, and, since 2009 (excluding in 2020), the NCAA Division II Baseball National Finals have been held at the USA Baseball National Training Complex in Cary, North Carolina with the complex earning the bid to host through at least the 2026 championship. University of Mount Olive and Town of Cary are co-hosts of the National Finals.

Tampa has been the most successful program, with 11 titles, including eight since 2006, and a historic threepeat (2024, 2025, 2026). Florida Southern is the second best with nine.

== Format ==
The 56-team tournament consists of a field of eight double-elimination regionals. The eight regions are the Atlantic, Central, East, Midwest, South, Southeast, South Central and West. In most cases, the No. 1 seed hosts a regional.

The eight regional champions advance to the National Finals, which also follows a double-elimination format. Teams are not re-seeded for the National Finals. The tournament field is broken up into two four-team brackets. When four teams remain, the two one-loss teams play the unbeaten team from the opposite bracket. The two remaining teams play each other for the championship. If both finalists are unbeaten, the championship is, in effect, a best two-out-of-three series. If both finalists have one loss, the championship is a single winner-takes-all game. If one finalist is unbeaten and one finalist has a loss, the one-loss team must defeat the unbeaten team twice to win the championship. The unbeaten team needs to beat the one-loss team only once to win the championship.

Starting in 2025, for the championship the remaining two teams (regardless of win/loss) would face off in a best of three series to determine the champion.

== Results ==
NCAA Division II Baseball Championship (NCAA College Division Baseball Championship)
| Year | Host city | Stadium | Championship Results | | |
| Year | Host city | Stadium | Champion | Score | Runner-up |
|---|---|---|---|---|---|
| 1968 | Springfield, MO | Meador Park | Chapman ^{(1)} | 11–0 | Delta State |
| 1969 | Springfield, MO | Meador Park | Illinois State ^{(1)} | 12–0 | Southwest Missouri State |
| 1970 | Springfield, MO | Meador Park | Valley State ^{(1)} | 2–1 | Nicholls State |
| 1971 | Springfield, MO | Meador Park | Florida Southern ^{(1)} | 4–0 | Central Michigan |
| 1972 | Springfield, IL | Lanphier Park | Florida Southern ^{(2)} | 5–1 | Cal State Northridge |
| 1973 | Springfield, IL | Lanphier Park | UC Irvine ^{(1)} | 9–6 | Ithaca |
| 1974 | Springfield, IL | Lanphier Park | UC Irvine ^{(2)} | 14–1 | LSU–New Orleans |
| 1975 | Springfield, IL | Lanphier Park | Florida Southern ^{(3)} | 10–7 | Marietta |
| 1976 | Springfield, IL | Lanphier Park | Cal Poly Pomona ^{(1)} | 17–3 | SIU Edwardsville |
| 1977 | Springfield, IL | Lanphier Park | UC Riverside ^{(1)} | 4–1 | Eckerd |
| 1978 | Springfield, IL | Lanphier Park | Florida Southern ^{(4)} | 7–2 | Delta State |
| 1979 | Springfield, IL | Lanphier Park | Valdosta State ^{(1)} | 3–2 | Florida Southern |
| 1980 | Riverside, CA | Riverside Sports Complex | Cal Poly Pomona ^{(2)} | 13–6 | New Haven |
| 1981 | Riverside, CA | Riverside Sports Complex | Florida Southern ^{(5)} | 9–0 | Eastern Illinois |
| 1982 | Riverside, CA | Riverside Sports Complex | UC Riverside ^{(2)} | 10–1 | Florida Southern |
| 1983 | Riverside, CA | Riverside Sports Complex | Cal Poly Pomona ^{(3)} | 9–7 | Jacksonville State |
| 1984 | Riverside, CA | Riverside Sports Complex | Cal State Northridge ^{(2)} | 10–5 | Florida Southern |
| 1985 | Montgomery, AL | Paterson Field | Florida Southern ^{(6)} | 15–5 | Cal Poly Pomona |
| 1986 | Montgomery, AL | Paterson Field | Troy State ^{(1)} | 5–0 | Columbus State |
| 1987 | Montgomery, AL | Paterson Field | Troy State ^{(2)} | 7–5 | Tampa |
| 1988 | Montgomery, AL | Paterson Field | Florida Southern ^{(7)} | 5–4 | Sacramento State |
| 1989 | Montgomery, AL | Paterson Field | Cal Poly * | 9–5 | New Haven |
| 1990 | Montgomery, AL | Paterson Field | Jacksonville State ^{(1)} | 12–8 | Cal State Northridge |
| 1991 | Montgomery, AL | Paterson Field | Jacksonville State ^{(2)} | 20–4 | Missouri Southern State |
| 1992 | Montgomery, AL | Paterson Field | Tampa ^{(1)} | 11–8 | Mansfield |
| 1993 | Montgomery, AL | Paterson Field | Tampa ^{(2)} | 7–5 | Cal Poly |
| 1994 | Montgomery, AL | Paterson Field | Central Missouri State ^{(1)} | 14–9 | Florida Southern |
| 1995 | Montgomery, AL | Paterson Field | Florida Southern ^{(8)} | 15–0 | Georgia College |
| 1996 | Montgomery, AL | Paterson Field | Kennesaw State ^{(1)} | 4–0 | Saint Joseph's (Ind.) |
| 1997 | Montgomery, AL | Paterson Field | Chico State ^{(1)} | 13–12 | Central Oklahoma |
| 1998 | Montgomery, AL | Paterson Field | Tampa ^{(3)} | 6–1 | Kennesaw State |
| 1999 | Montgomery, AL | Paterson Field | Chico State ^{(2)} | 11–5 | Kennesaw State |
| 2000 | Montgomery, AL | Paterson Field | Southeastern Oklahoma ^{(1)} | 7–2 | Fort Hays State |
| 2001 | Montgomery, AL | Paterson Field | St. Mary's (TX) ^{(1)} | 11–3 | Central Missouri State |
| 2002 | Montgomery, AL | Paterson Field | Columbus State ^{(1)} | 5–3 | Chico State |
| 2003 | Montgomery, AL | Paterson Field | Central Missouri State ^{(2)} | 11–4 | Tampa |
| 2004 | Montgomery, AL | Riverwalk Stadium | Delta State ^{(1)} | 12–8 | Grand Valley State |
| 2005 | Montgomery, AL | Riverwalk Stadium | Florida Southern ^{(9)} | 12–9 | North Florida |
| 2006 | Montgomery, AL | Riverwalk Stadium | Tampa ^{(4)} | 3–2 | Chico State |
| 2007 | Montgomery, AL | Riverwalk Stadium | Tampa ^{(5)} | 7–2 | Columbus State |
| 2008 | Sauget, IL | GCS Ballpark | Mount Olive ^{(1)} | 6–2 | Ouachita Baptist |
| 2009 | Cary, NC | USA Baseball National Training Complex | Lynn ^{(1)} | 2–1 | Emporia State |
| 2010 | Cary, NC | USA Baseball National Training Complex | Southern Indiana ^{(1)} | 6–4 | UC San Diego |
| 2011 | Cary, NC | USA Baseball National Training Complex | West Florida ^{(1)} | 12–2 | Winona State |
| 2012 | Cary, NC | USA Baseball National Training Complex | West Chester ^{(1)} | 9–0 | Delta State |
| 2013 | Cary, NC | USA Baseball National Training Complex | Tampa ^{(6)} | 8–2 | Minnesota State Mankato |
| 2014 | Cary, NC | USA Baseball National Training Complex | Southern Indiana ^{(2)} | 3–2 | Colorado Mesa |
| 2015 | Cary, NC | USA Baseball National Training Complex | Tampa ^{(7)} | 3–1 | Catawba |
| 2016 | Cary, NC | USA Baseball National Training Complex | Nova Southeastern ^{(1)} | 8–6 | Millersville |
| 2017 | Grand Prairie, TX | AirHogs Stadium | West Chester ^{(2)} | 5–2 | UC San Diego |
| 2018 | Cary, NC | USA Baseball National Training Complex | Augustana (SD) ^{(1)} | 3–2 | Columbus State |
| 2019 | Cary, NC | USA Baseball National Training Complex | Tampa ^{(8)} | 3–1 | Colorado Mesa |
| 2020 | Canceled due to the coronavirus pandemic | | | | |
| 2021 | Cary, NC | USA Baseball National Training Complex | Wingate ^{(1)} | 5–3 | Central Missouri |
| 2022 | Cary, NC | USA Baseball National Training Complex | North Greenville ^{(1)} | 5–3 | Point Loma |
| 2023 | Cary, NC | USA Baseball National Training Complex | Angelo State ^{(1)} | 6–5 | Rollins |
| 2024 | Cary, NC | USA Baseball National Training Complex | Tampa ^{(9)} | 8–3 | Angelo State |
| 2025 | Cary, NC | USA Baseball National Training Complex | Tampa ^{(10)} | 8–9 (UCM), 10–8 (UT), 11–5 (UT) | Central Missouri |
| 2026 | Cary, NC | USA Baseball National Training Complex | Tampa ^{(11)} | 7–4 (UT), 12–4 (WC), 8–4 (UT) | West Chester |
| 2027 | Cary, NC | USA Baseball National Training Complex | | Best of Three Series | |
| 2028 | Cary, NC | USA Baseball National Training Complex | | Best of Three Series | |

* Participation vacated by the NCAA Committee on Infractions

== Champions ==
National Championships, by school: 11, 9, 3, 2, 1

=== Active programs ===
| Team | Titles | Years |
|---|---|---|
| Tampa | 11 | 1992, 1993, 1998, 2006, 2007, 2013, 2015, 2019, 2024, 2025, 2026 |
| Florida Southern | 9 | 1971, 1972, 1975, 1978, 1981, 1985, 1988, 1995, 2005 |
| Cal Poly Pomona | 3 | 1976, 1980, 1983 |
| West Chester | 2 | 2012, 2017 |
| Central Missouri | 2 | 1994, 2003 |
| Chico State | 2 | 1997, 1999 |
| Angelo State | 1 | 2023 |
| North Greenville | 1 | 2022 |
| Wingate | 1 | 2021 |
| Augustana (SD) | 1 | 2018 |
| Nova Southeastern | 1 | 2016 |
| Lynn | 1 | 2009 |
| Mount Olive | 1 | 2008 |
| Delta State | 1 | 2004 |
| Columbus State | 1 | 2002 |
| St. Mary's (TX) | 1 | 2001 |
| SE Oklahoma State | 1 | 2000 |
| Valdosta State | 1 | 1979 |

=== Former programs ===
| Team | Titles | Years |
|---|---|---|
| Southern Indiana | 2 | 2010, 2014 |
| Jacksonville State | 2 | 1990, 1991 |
| Troy | 2 | 1986, 1987 |
| Cal State Northridge | 2 | 1970, 1984 |
| UC Riverside | 2 | 1977, 1982 |
| UC Irvine | 2 | 1973, 1974 |
| West Florida | 1 | 2011 |
| Kennesaw State | 1 | 1996 |
| Cal Poly | 1 | 1989* |
| Illinois State | 1 | 1969 |
| Chapman | 1 | 1968 |

- All former programs in this list currently play Division I baseball except Chapman, which plays Division III baseball.

== See also ==
- NCAA Division II softball tournament
- NCAA Division I baseball tournament
- NCAA Division III baseball tournament
- NAIA World Series
- National Club Baseball Association
- List of college baseball awards
- U.S. college baseball awards
- Pre-NCAA baseball champion
