= 2015 NCAA Division II baseball tournament =

- Season: 2015
- Teams: 48
- Finals site: USA Baseball National Training Complex; Cary, North Carolina
- Champions: Tampa (7th title)
- Runner-up: Catawba (1st CWS Appearance)
- Winning coach: Joe Urso (4th title)
- MOP: Nick Tindall (Tampa)

The 2015 NCAA Division II baseball Tournament decided the baseball champion at the NCAA Division II level for the 2015 season. The Tampa Spartans won their seventh national championship, beating the Indians of Catawba College in the national championship. Tampa catcher Nick Tindall was named tournament Most Outstanding Player, while Tampa head coach Joe Urso won his fourth championship with the Spartans.

== Regionals ==
=== Atlantic Region–Erie, PA ===
Hosted by Mercyhurst at Jerry Uht Park

First round
1	Mercyhurst	3
6	West Virginia State	1
3	Seton Hill	2
4	Winston–Salem State	5
2	Millersville	0
5	West Chester	5

Second round
1	Mercyhurst	1
3	Seton Hill	8
6	West Virginia State	1
2	Millersville	4
4	Winston–Salem State	9
5	West Chester	4
1	Mercyhurst	6^{11}
5	West Chester	4

Third round
3	Seton Hill	3
2	Millersville	6^{13}
4	Winston–Salem State	1
1	Mercyhurst	2

Semifinals
2	Millersville	6
4	Winston–Salem State	5

Final
2	Millersville	0
1	Mercyhurst	2

=== Central Region–St. Cloud, MN ===
Hosted by St. Cloud State at Joe Faber Field

First round
1	St. Cloud State	4
6	Henderson State	10
3	Emporia State	2
4	Southern Arkansas	9
2	Minnesota State	3
5	Missouri Southern State	1

Second round
6	Henderson State	3
4	Emporia State	2
2	Minnesota State	7
4	Southern Arkansas	2
1	St. Cloud State	2
5	Missouri Southern State	0

Third round
6	Henderson State	9
2	Minnesota State	6
4	Southern Arkansas	0
1	St. Cloud State	4

Semifinals
2	Minnesota State	4
1	St. Cloud State	5

Final
6	Henderson State	8	—
1	St. Cloud State	7	—

=== East Region–Rindge, NH ===
Hosted by Franklin Pierce at Pappas Field

First round
1	Franklin Pierce	0
6	St. Thomas Aquinas	3
3	Southern New Hampshire	2
4	Wilmington (DE)	3
2	Stonehill	5
5	Dowling	2

Second round
6	St. Thomas Aquinas	3
3	Southern New Hampshire	6
1	Franklin Pierce	1
5	Dowling	0
4	Wilmington (DE)	4
2	Stonehill	3
6	St. Thomas Aquinas	8
2	Stonehill	0

Third round
3	Southern New Hampshire	2
1	Franklin Pierce	8
4	Wilmington (DE)	3
6	St. Thomas Aquinas	7

Semifinals
1	Franklin Pierce	3
4	Wilmington (DE)	5

Final
4	Wilmington (DE)	11
6	St. Thomas Aquinas	9

=== Midwest Region–St. Charles, MO ===
Hosted by Lindenwood at Lou Brock Sports Complex

First round
1	Quincy	6^{10}
6	Ashland	5
3	William Jewell	0
4	Truman State	6
2	Grand Valley State	4
5	Drury	9

Second round
1	Quincy	3
3	William Jewell	5
6	Ashland	4
2	Grand Valley State	1
4	Truman State	9
5	Drury	5
1	Quincy	1
5	Drury	4

Third round
3	William Jewell	3
6	Ashland	5
4	Truman State	5
5	Drury	3

Final
6	Ashland	3	—
4	Truman State	6	—

=== South Region–Livingston, AL ===
Hosted by West Alabama at Tartt Field

First round
1	West Alabama	11
6	Albany State	5
3	Tampa	12
4	Florida Tech	6
2	Nova Southeastern	8
5	Lynn	1

Second round
1	West Alabama	1
4	Florida Tech	5
6	Albany State	4
5	Lynn	16
3	Tampa	8
2	Nova Southeastern	1
1	West Alabama	2
2	Nova Southeastern	0

Third round
4	Florida Tech	8
5	Lynn	5
3	Tampa	13
1	West Alabama	9

Final
4	Florida Tech	4	—
3	Tampa	5^{10}	—

=== South Central Region–Grand Junction, CO ===
Hosted by Colorado Mesa at Suplizio Field

First round
1	Colorado Mesa	5
6	St. Mary's	6
3	Angelo State	8
4	CSU–Pueblo	9
2	St. Edward's	0
5	West Texas A&M	5

Second round
6	St. Mary's	2
3	Angelo State	5
1	Colorado Mesa	8
2	St. Edward's	6
4	CSU–Pueblo	5
5	West Texas A&M	2
6	St. Mary's	3
5	West Texas A&M	2

Third round
3	Angelo State	8
1	Colorado Mesa	6
4	CSU–Pueblo	0
6	St. Mary's	6

Semifinals
3	Angelo State	15
4	CSU–Pueblo	7

Final
3	Angelo State	5
6	St. Mary's	2

=== Southeast Region–Thomasville, NC ===
Hosted by Catawba at Finch Field

First round
1	Catawba	4
6	North Greenville	3
3	North Georgia	10
4	Georgia College	3
2	Mount Olive	5
5	Wingate	1

Second round
1	Catawba	9
4	Georgia College	2
3	North Georgia	1
2	Mount Olive	5
6	North Greenville	0
5	Wingate	2

Third round
1	Catawba	7
2	Mount Olive	6
3	North Georgia	3
5	Wingate	2

Semifinals
2	Mount Olive	5
3	North Georgia	6

Final
1	Catawba	1	—
3	North Georgia	0	—

=== West Region–Walnut, CA ===
Hosted by Cal Poly Pomona at Mazmanian Field

First round
1	Cal Poly Pomona	12
6	Point Loma Nazarene	0
3	California Baptist	2
4	Dixie State	1
2	Azusa Pacific	17
5	UC San Diego	1

Second round
1	Cal Poly Pomona	1
4	Dixie State	2
6	Point Loma Nazarene	5
5	UC San Diego	7
3	California Baptist	5
2	Azusa Pacific	14
1	Cal Poly Pomona	6
3	California Baptist	4

Third round
4	Dixie State	0
5	UC San Diego	7
2	Azusa Pacific	2
1	Cal Poly Pomona	6

Semifinals
5	UC San Diego	5
2	Azusa Pacific	3

Final
5	UC San Diego	4
1	Cal Poly Pomona	7

== College World Series ==
=== Participants ===
School	Conference	Record (conference)	Head coach	Previous CWS appearances	Best CWS finish
Angelo State	Lone Star	41–16 (21–14)	Kevin Brooks	1 (last: 2007)	5th
Cal Poly Pomona	CCAA	43–15 (28–12)	Randy Betten	5 (last: 1985)	1st
Catawba	SAC	44–13 (23–6)	Jim Gantt	1 (last: 2012)	4th
Henderson State	GAC	31–19 (16–10)	Cody Hooten	0 (last: never)	N/A
Mercyhurst	PSAC	39–9 (22–6)	Joe Spano	0 (last: never)	N/A
Tampa	SSC	39–13 (16–8)	Joe Urso	16 (last: 2014)	1st
Truman	Great Lakes Valley	35–20 (21–15)	Dan Davis	0 (last: never)	N/A
Wilmington	CACC	37–13 (18–2)	Brian August	0 (last: never)	N/A

=== Results ===
==== Bracket ====
Hosted by University of Mount Olive and Town of Cary at USA Baseball National Training Complex.

First round
Henderson State	4
Angelo State	0
Wilmington	2
Catawba	3
Angelo State	5
Wilmington	0
Truman	1
Mercyhurst	3
Cal Poly Pomona	4
Tampa	7
Truman	2
Cal Poly Pomona	13

Second round
Henderson State	1
Catawba	5
Henderson State	4
Angelo State	1
Mercyhurst	1
Tampa	3
Mercyhurst	1
Cal Poly Pomona	5

Semifinals
Catawba	2	9
Cal Poly Pomona	11	6
Tampa	5	—
Henderson State	2	—

National Championship
Catawba	1
Tampa	3

==== Game results ====
Date	Game	Winner	Score	Loser	Notes
May 23	Game 1	Henderson State	4–0	Angelo State	
May 23	Game 2	Catawba	3–2	Wilmington	
May 24	Game 3	Mercyhurst	3–1	Truman	
May 24	Game 4	Tampa	7–4	Cal Poly Pomona	
May 25	Game 5	Angelo State	5–0	Wilmington	Wilmington eliminated
May 25	Game 6	Catawba	5–1	Henderson State	
May 26	Game 7	Cal Poly Pomona	13–2	Truman	Truman eliminated
May 26	Game 8	Tampa	3–1	Mercyhurst	
May 27	Game 9	Henderson State	4–1	Angelo State	Angelo State eliminated
May 27	Game 10	Cal Poly Pomona	5–1	Mercyhurst	Mercyhurst eliminated
May 28	Game 11	Tampa	5–2	Henderson State	Henderson State eliminated
May 28	Game 12	Cal Poly Pomona	11–2	Catawba	
May 29	Game 13	Catawba	9–6	Cal Poly Pomona	Cal Poly Pomona eliminated
May 30	Game 14	Tampa	3–1	Catawba	Tampa wins National Championship
