= 2021 NCAA Division II baseball tournament =

- Season: 2021
- Teams: 42
- Finals site: USA Baseball National Training Complex; Cary, North Carolina
- Champions: Wingate (1st title)
- Runner-up: Central Missouri (18th CWS Appearance)
- Winning coach: Jeff Gregory (1st title)
- MOP: Logan McNeely (Wingate)

The 2021 NCAA Division II baseball tournament decided the champion of baseball at the NCAA Division II level for the 2021 season. the Wingate Bulldogs won their first national championship in program history by defeating Central Missouri, who were playing in their third national championship. Head Coach Jeff Gregory won his first national championship in his tenure at Wingate. This tournament also introduced a Super Regional round to the tournament as the eight regionals were instead split into sixteen. Following which, the regional champions faced off in a best-of-three Super Regional. The winners of the super regionals would then advance to the College World Series.

== Regionals ==
=== Atlantic Regional ===
Hosted by Charleston at Triana Field in Charleston, West Virginia.

Upper round 1
4	Bloomsburg	3
5	Charleston	2
Lower round 1
5	Charleston	12
3	West Virginia State	6

Upper round 2
1	Seton Hill	15
4	Bloomsburg	3
2	Millersville	3
3	West Virginia State	2
Lower round 2
4	Bloomsburg	8
5	Charleston	14

Upper final
1	Seton Hill	5
2	Millersville	2
Lower final
2	Millersville	3
5	Charleston	1

Final
1	Seton Hill	8
2	Millersville	5

=== Central Regional ===
Hosted by Central Missouri at Crane Stadium in Warrensburg, Missouri.

First round
1	Central Missouri	2
6	Henderson State	1
3	Minnesota State	9
4	Arkansas Tech	8
2	Augustana (SD)	6
5	Southern Arkansas	8

Second round
1	Central Missouri	7
4	Arkansas Tech	4
3	Minnesota State	1
5	Southern Arkansas	2
6	Henderson State	8
2	Augustana (SD)	7

Third round
1	Central Missouri	4
5	Southern Arkansas	2
3	Minnesota State	7
6	Henderson State	4

Semifinals
5	Southern Arkansas	5
3	Minnesota State	1

Final
1	Central Missouri	12	—
5	Southern Arkansas	5	—

=== East Regional ===
Hosted by Franklin Pierce at Arthur and Martha Pappas Field in Rindge, New Hampshire.

First round
1	Southern New Hampshire	5
6	Dominican	1
3	Molloy	13
4	Franklin Pierce	5
2	St. Thomas Aquinas	0
5	Goldey–Beacom	3

Second round
1	Southern New Hampshire	14
4	Franklin Pierce	6
3	Molloy	3
5	Goldey–Beacom	2
6	Dominican	2
2	St. Thomas Aquinas	4

Third round
1	Southern New Hampshire	9
3	Molloy	3
5	Goldey–Beacom	2
2	St. Thomas Aquinas	1

Semifinals
3	Molloy	6
5	Goldey–Beacom	4

Final
1	Southern New Hampshire	3	9
3	Molloy	8	2

=== Midwest Regional ===
Hosted by Lindenwood at Lou Brock Sports Complex in St. Charles, Missouri

First round
1	UIS	9
6	Northwood	13
3	Davenport	2
4	Lindenwood	6
2	Trevecca Nazarene	8
5	Quincy	3

Second round
6	Northwood	1
3	Davenport	16
1	UIS	3
5	Quincy	4
4	Lindenwood	4
2	Trevecca Nazarene	7
6	Northwood	7
4	Lindenwood	5

Third round
3	Davenport	22
5	Quincy	13
2	Trevecca Nazarene	9
6	Northwood	4

Final
3	Davenport	9	6
2	Trevecca Nazarene	11	2

=== South Regional ===
Hosted by West Florida at Jim Spooner Field in Pensacola, Florida.

First round
1	West Florida	6
6	Shorter	3
3	Tampa	7
4	Delta State	6
2	Lee	4
5	Alabama–Huntsville	1

Second round
1	West Florida	10
4	Delta State	3
3	Tampa	12
2	Lee	7
6	Shorter	2
5	Alabama–Huntsville	7

Third round
1	West Florida	7
3	Tampa	17
2	Lee	10
5	Alabama–Huntsville	4

Semifinals
1	West Florida	7
2	Lee	0

Final
3	Tampa	8	—
1	West Florida	7	—

=== Southeast Regional ===
Hosted by North Greenville at Ashmore Field in Tigerville, South Carolina.

First round
1	Catawba	10
6	Columbus State	2
3	Wingate	6
4	North Greenville	4
2	Mount Olive	7
5	UNC Pembroke	6

Second round
1	Catawba	8
4	North Greenville	12
6	Columbus State	8
5	UNC Pembroke	2
3	Wingate	19
2	Mount Olive	6
1	Catawba	5
2	Mount Olive	6

Third round
4	North Greenville	9
6	Columbus State	10
3	Wingate	11
2	Mount Olive	5

Final
6	Columbus State	2	—
3	Wingate	4	—

=== South Central Regional ===
Hosted by Angelo State at Foster Field in San Angelo, Texas.

First round
1	Colorado Mesa	11
4	UCCS	9
3	Angelo State	10
2	West Texas A&M	2
Lower round 1
4	UCCS	6
2	West Texas A&M	7

Semi-finals
1	Colorado Mesa	2
3	Angelo State	5
Lower final
1	Colorado Mesa	6
2	West Texas A&M	7

Finals
3	Angelo State	18	—
2	West Texas A&M	4	—

=== West Regional ===
Hosted by Northwest Nazarene at Elmore W. Vail Baseball Field in Nampa, Idaho.

		Azusa Pacific	Northwest Nazarene	Western Oregon
1	Azusa Pacific		L 2–3	L 5–16
2	Northwest Nazarene	W 3–2		L 1–2
3	Western Oregon	W 16–5	W 2–1	

Championship
3	Western Oregon	5	6
2	Northwest Nazarene	7	12

== College World Series ==
=== Participants ===
School	Conference	Record (conference)	Head coach	Previous CWS appearances	Best CWS finish
Angelo State	Lone Star	42–7 (25–5)	Kevin Brooks	3 (last: 2016)	5th
Central Missouri	MIAA	43–6 (30–3)	Kyle Crookes	18 (last: 2019)	1st
Northwest Nazarene	GNWAC	34–8 (21–3)	Joe Schaefer	0 (last: never)	N/A
Seton Hill	PSAC	38–6 (23–4)	Marc Marizzaldi	1 (last: 2014)	4th
Southern New Hampshire	Northeast-10	28–7 (19–5)	Scott Loiseau	2 (last: 2018)	4th
Tampa	SSC	20–4 (15–3)	Joe Urso	18 (last: 2019)	1st
Trevecca Nazarene	GMWAC	36–11 (23–5)	Chase Sain	0 (last: never)	N/A
Wingate	SAC	34–12 (20–10)	Jeff Gregory	0 (last: never)	N/A

=== Results ===
==== Bracket ====
First round
1	Central Missouri	9
8	Northwest Nazarene	3
4	Trevecca Nazarene	6
5	Tampa	7
8	Northwest Nazarene	9
4	Trevecca Nazarene	3
3	Angelo State	6
6	Wingate	2
2	Seton Hill	4
7	Southern New Hampshire	3
6	Wingate	3
7	Southern New Hampshire	2

Second round
1	Central Missouri	8
5	Tampa	4
5	Tampa	5
8	Northwest Nazarene	2
3	Angelo State	9
2	Seton Hill	4
2	Seton Hill	1
6	Wingate	5

Semifinals
1	Central Missouri	1	3
5	Tampa	8	1
3	Angelo State	4	7
6	Wingate	5	8

Finals
1	Central Missouri	3
6	Wingate	5

==== Game results ====
Date	Game	Winner	Score	Loser	Notes
June 5	Game 1	(5) Tampa	7–6	(4) Trevecca Nazarene	
June 5	Game 2	(1) Central Missouri	9–3	(8) Northwest Nazarene	
June 6	Game 3	(3) Angelo State	6–2	(6) Wingate	
June 6	Game 4	(2) Seton Hill	4–3	(7) Southern New Hampshire	
June 7	Game 5	(8) Northwest Nazarene	9–3	(4) Trevecca Nazarene	Trevecca Nazarene eliminated
June 7	Game 6	(1) Central Missouri	8–4	(5) Tampa	
June 8	Game 7	(6) Wingate	3–2	(7) Southern New Hampshire	Southern New Hampshire eliminated
June 8	Game 8	(3) Angelo State	9–4	(2) Seton Hill	
June 9	Game 9	(6) Wingate	5–1	(2) Seton Hill	Seton Hill eliminated
June 9	Game 10	(5) Tampa	5–2	(8) Northwest Nazarene	Northwest Nazarene eliminated
June 10	Game 11	(6) Wingate	5–4	(3) Angelo State	
June 11	Game 12	(5) Tampa	8–1	(1) Central Missouri	
June 11	Game 13	(6) Wingate	8–7	(3) Angelo State	Angelo State eliminated
June 11	Game 14	(1) Central Missouri	3–1	(5) Tampa	Tampa eliminated
June 12	Game 15	(6) Wingate	5–2	(1) Central Missouri	Wingate wins National Championship
