= Tampa Spartans =

Athletic teams representing the University of Tampa, located in Tampa, Florida

- University: University of Tampa
- Nickname: Spartans
- NCAA: Division II
- Conference: Sunshine State (primary)
- Athletic director: E.J. Brophy
- Location: Tampa, Florida
- Varsity teams: 20 (8 men's, 12 women's)
- Basketball arena: Bob Martinez Athletics Center
- Baseball stadium: University of Tampa Baseball Field
- Softball stadium: Vince Naimoli Family Softball Field
- Soccer stadium: Pepin Stadium
- Aquatics center: UT Aquatic Center
- Lacrosse stadium: Naimoli Athletic Family and Intramural Complex
- Tennis venue: Naimoli and Young Family Complex
- Colors: Black, red, and gold
- Website: tampaspartans.com
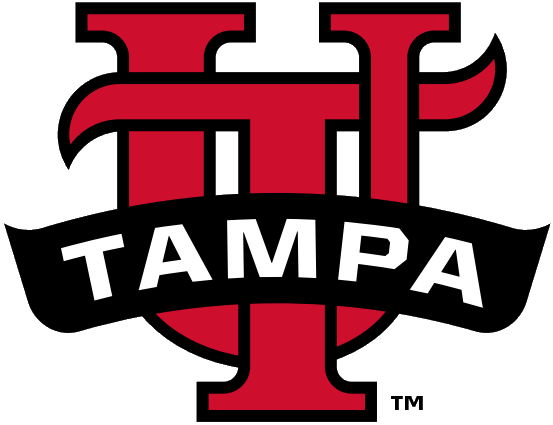

Team NCAA championships
- 22

Individual and relay NCAA champions
- 35

The Tampa Spartans are the athletic teams that represent the University of Tampa, located in Tampa, Florida, in NCAA Division II intercollegiate sports. The Spartans compete as members of the Sunshine State Conference for all sports besides beach volleyball and track and field, which compete as independents. Tampa has been a member of the conference since 1981.

== Varsity teams ==
Tampa sponsors 20 varsity teams, 8 for men and 12 for women:

| Men's sports | Women's sports |
|---|---|
| Baseball | Basketball |
| Basketball | Beach volleyball |
| Cross country | Cross country |
| Golf | Golf |
| Lacrosse | Lacrosse |
| Soccer | Rowing |
| Swimming | Soccer |
| Track and field^{1} | Softball |
| | Swimming |
| | Tennis |
| | Track and field^{1} |
^{1} – outdoor only

=== Former sports ===
- Football
- Men's tennis
- Water skiing
- Men's wrestling

== National championships ==
Spartan varsity teams have won 19 NCAA Division II National Titles as of December 2022, which is seventh-most among current Division II teams. The titles won are as follows: eight in baseball (1992, 1993, 1998, 2006, 2007, 2013, 2015 and 2019), three in men's soccer (1981, 1994 and 2001), two in golf (1987 and 1988), four in women's volleyball (2006, 2014, 2018, and 2021), one in women's soccer (2007), and one in men's lacrosse (2022). They also won a beach volleyball title in the AVCA in 2019 and 2021, for a total of 21 national titles. UT athletes have won 35 individual and relay NCAA championships.

=== Team championships ===
| Association | Division | Sport | Year | Opponent/Runner-Up | Score |
|---|---|---|---|---|---|
| NCAA | Division II | Baseball | 1992 | Mansfield | 11–8 |
| NCAA | Division II | Baseball | 1993 | Cal Poly San Luis Obispo | 7–5 |
| NCAA | Division II | Baseball | 1998 | Kennesaw State | 6–1 |
| NCAA | Division II | Baseball | 2006 | Chico State | 3–2 |
| NCAA | Division II | Baseball | 2007 | Columbus State | 7–2 |
| NCAA | Division II | Baseball | 2013 | Minnesota State–Mankato | 8–2 |
| NCAA | Division II | Baseball | 2015 | Catawba | 3–1 |
| NCAA | Division II | Baseball | 2019 | Colorado Mesa | 3–1 |
| NCAA | Division II | Baseball | 2024 | Angelo State | 8–3 |
| NCAA | Division II | Baseball | 2025 | Central Missouri | 11–5 |
| NCAA | Division II | Baseball | 2026 | West Chester | 8–4 |
| NCAA | Division II | Men's soccer | 1981 | Cal State Los Angeles | 1–0 (OT) |
| NCAA | Division II | Men's soccer | 1994 | Oakland | 3–2 (2OT) |
| NCAA | Division II | Men's soccer | 2001 | Cal State Dominguez Hills | 2–1 |
| NCAA | Division II | Men's golf | 1987 | Columbus | 1,175–1,180 |
| NCAA | Division II | Men's golf | 1988 | Florida Southern | 1,189–1,203 |
| NCAA | Division II | Men's lacrosse | 2022 | Mercy | 11–7 |
| NCAA | Division II | Men's lacrosse | 2026 | Adelphi | 12–11 (OT) |
| NCAA | Division II | Women's lacrosse | 2024 | Adelphi | 13–8 |
| NCAA | Division II | Women's lacrosse | 2025 | Adelphi | 15–9 |
| NCAA | Division II | Women's soccer | 2007 | Franklin Pierce | 3–1 |
| NCAA | Division II | Women's volleyball | 2007 | North Alabama | 3–1 |
| NCAA | Division II | Women's volleyball | 2014 | Southwest Minnesota State | 3–0 |
| NCAA | Division II | Women's volleyball | 2018 | Western Washington | 3–2 |
| NCAA | Division II | Women's volleyball | 2021 | Washburn | 3–0 |
| AVCA | Small College Division (Division II-III) | Beach volleyball | 2019 | Texas A&M–Kingsville | 3–0 |
| AVCA | Small College Division (Division II-III) | Beach volleyball | 2021 | Spring Hill | 3–0 |
| AVCA | Small College Division (Division II) | Beach volleyball | 2023 | Colorado Mesa | 3–0 |
| AVCA | Small College Division (Division II) | Beach volleyball | 2024 | Concordia Irvine | 3–2 |
| AVCA | Small College Division (Division II) | Beach volleyball | 2025 | Concordia Irvine | 3–2 |

== Rivalries ==
=== St. Petersburg College ===
UT's first athletic rival was St. Petersburg College. UT even adopted the Spartan as its mascot in the 1930s because SPC were known as the Trojans at the time (though they have since changed to the Titans). As SPC is a junior college, the schools rarely (if ever) meet nowadays.

=== Florida Southern ===
The Spartans main rival is the nearby Sunshine State Conference foe Florida Southern College Moccasins. The rivalry is known best for its baseball games, with both teams regularly among the best in NCAA Division II. The Spartans and Mocs have a combined 19 baseball national championships, with Tampa winning 10 and FSC winning 9. No other team in Division II has more than 3 baseball titles.

=== Rowdies Cup ===
Each August, the Spartans men's soccer team faces their crosstown rivals, the Division I University of South Florida Bulls, in an NCAA preseason match which celebrates the Tampa Bay Area's rich soccer history. In addition to holding the Rowdies Cup trophy for the next 12 months, the winning side also gets to hoist the actual 1975 Soccer Bowl trophy that was won by the original Tampa Bay Rowdies and is housed at USF's Corbett Soccer Stadium. As of the 2022 edition, USF holds a 25–11–3 edge in the all-time series. The match was previously contested as the Mayor's Cup and dates back to 1972.

== Football ==
UT fielded a men's football team from 1933 to 1974. The "Tampa U" Spartans first played at Plant Field near the school's campus from 1933 to 1936, then played across the street at Phillips Field for three decades, then became Tampa Stadium's first home team when they moved to the brand-new venue in 1967. The move to Tampa Stadium coincided with the program's greatest success. The Spartans beat the cross-state rival Miami Hurricanes in 1970, moved up to NCAA Division I in 1971, and defeated the Hurricanes again in 1972. Several UT players from this era went on to play in the NFL, and the Spartans won the 1972 Tangerine Bowl.

However, rising expenses resulted in the football program operating at a loss and required the school to subsidize it with several hundred thousand dollars per year. When the NFL awarded Tampa an expansion team (the future Tampa Bay Buccaneers) in 1974, the university's financial committee predicted that local support for Spartan football would decrease and recommended that the program be folded before the 1975 season. On February 12, 1975, the University of Tampa's board of directors voted to drop the sport immediately.

== Other sports ==
In addition to varsity sports, UT fields competitive junior varsity baseball and men's lacrosse teams that play a full schedule against area colleges and visiting northern schools and it also fields a crew team that competes in crew events around the nation.

== Hall of fame ==
The University of Tampa Athletic Hall of Fame includes former MLB players Lou Piniella and Tino Martinez, former NFL players Freddie Solomon of the San Francisco 49ers, and John Matuszak of the Oakland Raiders.
