= 2023 NCAA Division II baseball tournament =

- Season: 2023
- Teams: 56
- Finals site: USA Baseball National Training Complex; Cary, North Carolina
- Champions: Angelo State (1st title)
- Runner-up: Rollins
- Winning coach: Kevin Brooks (1 title)

The 2023 NCAA Division II baseball tournament was the 55th edition of the NCAA Division II baseball tournament. The 56-team tournament decided the champion of baseball at the NCAA Division II level for the 2023 season. The Angelo State Rams won their first men's national championship as a member of the NCAA by defeating Rollins. Pitcher Aaron Munson was named tournament MVP.

== Bracket ==
First round
1	Millersville	6
8	Indianapolis	5
4	Rollins	7
5	Cal State San Bernardino	1
8	Indianapolis	8
5	Cal State San Bernardino	10
2	North Greenville	4
7	Augustana	1
3	Angelo State	3
6	Southern New Hampshire	1
7	Augustana	6
6	Southern New Hampshire	10

Second round
1	Millersville	4
4	Rollins	17
1	Millersville	5
5	CSU San Bernardino	6
2	North Greenville	2
3	Angelo State	6
2	North Greenville	4
6	Southern New Hampshire	8

Semifinals
4	Rollins	11	10
5	CSU San Bernardino	16	8
3	Angelo State	5	X
6	Southern New Hampshire	3	X

Final
4	Rollins	5
3	Angelo State	6
