= 2026 NCAA Division II baseball tournament =

- Season: 2026
- Teams: 56
- Finals site: USA Baseball National Training Complex; Cary, North Carolina
- Champions: Tampa (11th title)
- Runner-up: West Chester (6th CWS Appearance)
- Winning coach: Joe Urso (8th title)
- MOP: Luke Fikar (Tampa)

The 2026 NCAA Division II baseball tournament decided the champion of baseball in NCAA Division II for the 2026 season. The Tampa claimed their eleventh national title and third in a row. In the final, Augustana defeated the West Chester Golden Rams. The Golden Rams made their sixth appearance in the College World Series, having won the event in 2012 and 2017.

== Finals ==
=== Participants ===
| School | Conference | Record (conference) | Head coach | Previous finals appearances | Best finals finish |
|---|---|---|---|---|---|
| Bentley | Northeast-10 | 44–15 (28–8) | Mike Hill | 0 (Last: never) | N/A |
| Catawba | SAC | 47–12 (29–4) | Jim Gantt | 4 (Last: 2024) | 2nd |
| Central Missouri | MAIAA | 39–15 (24–12) | Kyle Crookes | 21 (Last: 2025) | 1st |
| Indianapolis | Great Lakes Valley | 39–22 (22–10) | Al Ready | 4 (Last: 2022) | 3rd |
| Point Loma | Pacific West | 49–11 (37–7) | Justin James | 2 (Last: 2024) | 2nd |
| Tampa | Sunshine State | 46–8 (27–3) | Joe Urso | 21 (Last: 2025) | 1st |
| UT Tyler | Lone Star | 48–12 (40–10) | Brent Porche | 1 (Last: 2025) | 5th |
| West Chester | PSAC | 44–10 (21–7) | Michael LaRosa | 5 (Last: 2022) | 1st |

=== Results ===
First round
4 | Central Missouri | 3
5 | UT Tyler | 8
1 | West Chester | 12
8 | Indianapolis | 3
4 | Central Missouri | 23
8 | Indianapolis | 9
3 | Catawba | 5
6 | Point Loma | 11
2 | Tampa | 13
7 | Bentley | 2
3 | Catawba | 15
7 | Bentley | 8

Second round
5 | UT Tyler | 2
1 | West Chester | 8
5 | UT Tyler | 11
4 | Central Missouri | 7
6 | Point Loma | 1
2 | Tampa | 2
6 | Point Loma | 9
3 | Catawba | 10

Semifinals
1 | West Chester | 6 | —
5 | UT Tyler | 5 | —
2 | Tampa | 17 | —
3 | Catawba | 2 | —

Finals
1 | West Chester | 4 | 12 | 4
2 | Tampa | 7 | 4 | 8

==== Game Results ====
| Date | Game | Winner | Score | Loser | Notes |
|---|---|---|---|---|---|
| May 29 | Game 1 | UT Tyler | 8 – 3 | Central Missouri | |
| May 29 | Game 2 | West Chester | 12 – 3 | Indianapolis | |
| May 30 | Game 3 | Point Loma | 11 – 5 | Catawba | |
| May 30 | Game 4 | Tampa | 13 – 2 | Bentley | |
| May 31 | Game 5 | Central Missouri | 23 – 9 | Indianapolis | Indianapolis eliminated |
| May 31 | Game 6 | West Chester | 8 – 2 | UT Tyler | |
| June 1 | Game 7 | Catawba | 15 – 8 | Bentley | Bentley eliminated |
| June 1 | Game 8 | Tampa | 2 – 1 | Point Loma | |
| June 2 | Game 9 | UT Tyler | 11 – 7 | Central Missouri | Central Missouri eliminated |
| June 2 | Game 10 | Catawba | 10 – 9 | Point Loma | Point Loma eliminated |
| June 3 | Game 11 | West Chester | 6–5 | UT Tyler | UT Tyler eliminated |
| June 3 | Game 12 | Tampa | 17 – 2 | Catawba | Catawba eliminated |
Championship Series
| June 4 | Game 1 | Tampa | 7 – 4 | West Chester | |
| June 5 | Game 2 | West Chester | 12 – 4 | Tampa | |
| June 6 | Game 3 | Tampa | 8 – 4 | West Chester | Tampa wins National Championship |
