= 2009 NCAA Division II baseball tournament =

- Season: 2009
- Finals site: USA Baseball National Training Complex; Cary, North Carolina
- Champions: Lynn (1st title)
- Runner-up: Emporia State (1st CWS Appearance)
- Winning coach: Rudy Garbalosa (1st title)
- MOP: Tommy Kahnle, P (Lynn)
- Attendance: 16,446

The 2009 NCAA Division II baseball tournament was the postseason tournament hosted by the NCAA to determine the national champion of baseball among its Division II members at the end of the 2009 NCAA Division II baseball season.

The final, eight-team double elimination tournament, also known as the College World Series, was played at the USA Baseball National Training Complex in Cary, North Carolina from May 23–30, 2009.

Lynn defeated Emporia State in the championship game, 2–1, to claim the Fighting Knights' first Division II national title.

== Bracket ==
=== College World Series ===
- Note: Losers of each round are shifted to the opposing bracket.

First Rounds; May 23–26, 2009	Second Rounds; May 25–May 27, 2009
Mesa State	7
Belmont Abbey	2
Mesa State	2
Emporia State	5
Grand Valley State	0
Emporia State	3
Bracket One
UC San Diego	8
West Chester	6
Dowling	1
UC San Diego	13
UC San Diego	1
Dowling	3
Dowling	5
Lynn	6
West Chester	3
Lynn	7
Bracket Two
Belmont Abbey	5
Grand Valley State	4
Mesa State	2
Belmont Abbey	9

Semifinals; May 28, 2009
Emporia State	5
UC San Diego	3
Lynn	7
Belmont Abbey	5

Championship; May 30, 2009
Emporia State	1
Lynn	2

== See also ==
- 2009 NCAA Division I baseball tournament
- 2009 NCAA Division III baseball tournament
- 2009 NAIA World Series
