= 2013 NCAA Division II baseball tournament =

- Season: 2013
- Finals site: USA Baseball National Training Complex; Cary, North Carolina
- Champions: Tampa (6th title)
- Runner-up: Minnesota State (1st CWS Appearance)
- Winning coach: Joe Urso (3rd title)
- MOP: Jake Schrader, 3B (Tampa)
- Attendance: 15,753

The 2013 NCAA Division II baseball tournament was the postseason tournament hosted by the NCAA to determine the national champion of baseball among its Division II members at the end of the 2013 NCAA Division II baseball season.

The final, eight-team double elimination tournament, also known as the College World Series, was played at the USA Baseball National Training Complex in Cary, North Carolina from May 25–June 1, 2013.

Tampa defeated Minnesota State in the championship game, 8–2, to claim the Spartans' sixth Division II national title and first since 2007.

== Bracket ==
=== College World Series ===
- Note: Losers of each round were shifted to the opposing bracket.

First Rounds; May 25–28, 2013	Second Rounds; May 27–May 29, 2013
Franklin Pierce	1
Shippensburg	0
Franklin Pierce	5
Minnesota State	10
Grand Valley State	0
Minnesota State	2
Bracket One
Coker	2
Grand Canyon	10
St. Edward's	9
Grand Canyon	5
Tampa	12
Coker	4
Tampa	10
St. Edward's	3
Grand Canyon	0
St. Edward's	1
Bracket Two
Shippensburg	4
Grand Valley State	8
Franklin Pierce	3
Grand Valley State	10

Semifinals; May 30–31, 2013
Minnesota State	6
St. Edward's	5
Tampa	0	10
Grand Valley State	4	1

Championship; June 1, 2013
Minnesota State	2
Tampa	8

== See also ==
- 2013 NCAA Division I baseball tournament
- 2013 NCAA Division III baseball tournament
- 2013 NAIA World Series
