= 2010 NCAA Division II baseball tournament =

- Season: 2010
- Finals site: USA Baseball National Training Complex; Cary, North Carolina
- Champions: Southern Indiana (1st title)
- Runner-up: UC San Diego (2nd CWS Appearance)
- Winning coach: Tracy Archuleta (1st title)
- MOP: Taylor Dennis, P (Southern Indiana)
- Attendance: 14,754

The 2010 NCAA Division II baseball tournament was the postseason tournament hosted by the NCAA to determine the national champion of baseball among its Division II members at the end of the 2010 NCAA Division II baseball season.

The final, eight-team double elimination tournament, also known as the College World Series, was played at the USA Baseball National Training Complex in Cary, North Carolina from May 22–29, 2010.

Southern Indiana defeated UC San Diego in the championship game, 6–4, to claim the Screaming Eagles' first Division II national title.

== Bracket ==
=== College World Series ===
- Note: Losers of each round were shifted to the opposing bracket.

First Rounds; May 22–25, 2010 | Second Rounds; May 24–May 26, 2010
Central Missouri | 3
Tampa | 0
Central Missouri | 1
UC San Diego | 2
UC San Diego | 3
Georgia College | 2
Bracket One
Franklin Pierce | 6
Minnesota State | 2
Kutztown | 2
Franklin Pierce | 6
Kutztown | 2
Franklin Pierce | 1
Kutztown | 1
Southern Indiana | 7
Minnesota State | 6
Southern Indiana | 8
Bracket Two
Tampa | 1
Georgia College | 2
Central Missouri | 4
Georgia College | 9

Semifinals; May 27–28, 2010
UC San Diego | 6
Franklin Pierce | 3
Southern Indiana | 0 | 3
Georgia College | 3 | 2

Championship; May 29, 2010
UC San Diego | 4
Southern Indiana | 6

== See also ==
- 2010 NCAA Division I baseball tournament
- 2010 NCAA Division III baseball tournament
- 2010 NAIA World Series
