= 2022 NCAA Division II baseball tournament =

- Season: 2022
- Teams: 56
- Finals site: USA Baseball National Training Complex; Cary, North Carolina
- Champions: North Greenville (1st title)
- Runner-up: Point Loma

The 2022 NCAA Division II baseball tournament decided the champion of baseball at the NCAA Division II level for the 2022 season. The North Greenville Trailblazers won their first national championship in program history by defeating Point Loma. 56 teams were selected to play in the tournament, with 22 coming as automatic qualifiers from winning their conference tournament. The championship had eight region sites hosting three teams along with eight regional sites hosting four teams for a total of sixteen regional sites, all of which were double-elimination tournaments played from May 19 to May 22. Those regional winners advance to a best-of-three superregional on May 27 and May 28 that would whittle it down to a double-elimination championship final between eight teams from June 4 to June 11.

== Bracket ==
First round
3	Southern Arkansas	3
6	Rollins	1
2	Point Loma	8
7	Illinois–Springfield	1
6	Rollins	3
7	Illinois–Springfield	2
4	Southern New Hampshire University	4
5	Angelo State	7
1	North Greenville	3
8	West Chester	1
4	Southern New Hampshire	3
8	West Chester	7

Second round
3	Southern Arkansas	3
2	Point Loma	11
3	Southern Arkansas	5
6	Rollins	7
5	Angelo State	3
1	North Greenville	18
5	Angelo State	2
8	West Chester	12

Semifinals
2	Point Loma	4	2
6	Rollins	12	0
1	North Greenville	8
8	West Chester	5

Final
2	Point Loma	3
1	North Greenville	5
