= 1998 NCAA Division II baseball tournament =

- Season: 1998
- Finals site: Paterson Field; Montgomery, Alabama
- Champions: Tampa (3rd title)
- Runner-up: Kennesaw State (2nd CWS Appearance)
- Winning coach: Terry Rupp (1st title)
- MOP: Ronnie Merrill, SS (Tampa)
- Attendance: 22,586

The 1998 NCAA Division II baseball tournament was the postseason tournament hosted by the NCAA to determine the national champion of baseball among its Division II members at the end of the 1998 NCAA Division II baseball season.

The final, eight-team double elimination tournament, also known as the College World Series, was again played at Paterson Field in Montgomery, Alabama.

Tampa defeated Kennesaw State, 6–1, in the championship game, the Spartans' third Division II national title and first since 1993.

== Bracket ==
=== College World Series ===
First Round; May 23–26, 1998
Central Missouri State	5
Tampa	9
Chico State	2
West Georgia	5
Saint Joseph's (IN)	15
New Haven	3
Millersville	6
Saint Joseph's (IN)	0
New Haven	6
Kennesaw State	7
Central Missouri State	3
Chico State	5

Second Round; May 25–27, 1998
Tampa	5
West Georgia	1
West Georgia	8
Saint Joseph's (IN)	7
Millersville	4
Kennesaw State	11
Millersville	5
Chico State	6

Semifinals; May 28, 1998
Tampa	10
West Georgia	0
Kennesaw State	15
Chico State	5

Championship; May 30, 1998
Tampa	6
Kennesaw State	1

== See also ==
- 1998 NCAA Division I baseball tournament
- 1998 NCAA Division III baseball tournament
- 1998 NAIA World Series
- 1998 NCAA Division II softball tournament
