= UT men's basketball =

UT men's basketball may refer to:

- Tampa Spartans men's basketball, the collegiate men's basketball program of The University of Tampa
- Tennessee Volunteers basketball, the collegiate men's basketball program of the University of Tennessee, Knoxville
- Texas Longhorns men's basketball, the collegiate men's basketball program of The University of Texas at Austin
- Toledo Rockets men's basketball, the collegiate men's basketball program of The University of Toledo
