= 2007 NCAA Division III baseball tournament =

- Season: 2007
- Teams: 53
- Finals site: Time Warner Cable Field at Fox Cities Stadium; Grand Chute, Wisconsin
- Champions: Kean (1st title)
- Runner-up: Emory

The 2007 NCAA Division III baseball tournament was played at the end of the 2007 NCAA Division III baseball season to determine the 32nd national champion of college baseball at the NCAA Division III level. The tournament concluded with eight teams competing at Time Warner Cable Field at Fox Cities Stadium in Grand Chute, Wisconsin for the championship. Eight regional tournaments were held to determine the participants in the World Series. Regional tournaments were contested in double-elimination format, with three regions consisting of six teams and five consisting of seven, for a total of 53 teams participating in the tournament. The tournament champion was Kean, who defeated Emory for the championship.

== Bids ==
The 53 competing teams were:

== Regionals ==
=== Midwest Regional ===
Witter Field-Wisconsin Rapids, WI (Host: University of Wisconsin-Stevens Point)

First round
1	Wisconsin-Stevens Point	11
6	St. Scholastica	3
2	St. Thomas (MN)	5
5	Wisconsin-Oshkosh	1
3	Ripon	4
4	St. Olaf	1

Second round/elimination round 1
Wisconsin-Stevens Point	3
St. Olaf	7
St. Scholastica	5
Wisconsin-Oshkosh	11
St. Thomas (MN)	9
Ripon	3
Wisconsin-Stevens Point	11
Ripon	10

Third round/elimination round 2
St. Olaf	4
Wisconsin-Oshkosh	5
St. Thomas (MN)	3
Wisconsin-Stevens Point	6

Elimination final
Wisconsin-Oshkosh	5
St. Thomas (MN)	4^{11}

Final
Wisconsin-Oshkosh	0
Wisconsin-Stevens Point	6

=== South Regional ===
Panther Field-Ferrum, VA (Host: Ferrum College)

First round/elimination round 1	Second round/elimination round 2	Semifinals/elimination semifinals	Finals
4	Methodist	21
5	Bridgewater (VA)	14
Methodist	3
Emory	10
1	Emory	10
Bridgewater (VA)	1
Emory	9
Ferrum	6
3	York (PA)	2
6	Ferrum	10
Ferrum	5
Salisbury	3
2	Salisbury	11
7	Villa Julie	5	Emory	6	6
Ferrum	11^{12}	5^{12}
Lower round 1	Lower round 2	Lower round 3	Lower final
Ferrum	17
Methodist	1	York (PA)	9
York (PA)	5
Salisbury	3
York (PA)	21	York (PA)	4
Villa Julie	0

=== New England Regional ===
Whitehouse Field-Harwich, MA (Host: Eastern College Athletic Conference)

First round/elimination round 1	Second round/elimination round 2	Semifinals/elimination semifinals	Finals
4	Curry	4
5	Keene State	9^{10}
Keene State	6
Wheaton (MA)	3
1	Wheaton (MA)	7
Curry	6^{16}
Keene State	1
Eastern Connecticut State	6
3	Williams	5
6	Western New England	10
Western New England	3
Eastern Connecticut State	6
2	Eastern Connecticut State	10
7	St. Joseph's (ME)	2	Eastern Connecticut State	18	--
Keene State	3	--
Lower round 1	Lower round 2	Lower round 3	Lower final
Keene State	4
Wheaton (MA)	7	Wheaton (MA)	1
Williams	1
Western New England	1
Williams	12	Williams	3
St. Joseph's (ME)	7

=== Central Regional ===
Jack Horenberger Field-Bloomington, IL (Host: Illinois Wesleyan University)

First round
1	Luther	3
6	Augustana	1
2	Illinois Wesleyan	7
5	Webster	11
3	Carthage	5
4	Washington-St. Louis	4

Second round/elimination round 1
Luther	4
Washington-St. Louis	2
Webster	4
Carthage	6
Augustana	6
Illinois Wesleyan	5^{11}

Semifinals/elimination round 2
Luther	3
Carthage	6
Webster	7
Augustana	15

Elimination final
1
Augustana	6

Final
Carthage	5	--
Augustana	4	--

=== Mideast Regional ===
Mills Field-Strongsville, OH (Host: The College of Wooster)

First round
1	Wooster	2
6	Mt. St. Joseph	1
2	Otterbein	9
5	Ohio Wesleyan	4
3	Hope	1
4	Marietta	9

Second round/elimination round 1
Wooster	3
Hope	5
Mt. St. Joseph	6
Ohio Wesleyan	7
Otterbein	0
Marietta	4
Wooster	3
Otterbein	2

Semifinals
Hope	5
Ohio Wesleyan	6
Marietta	6
Wooster	3

Final
Ohio Wesleyan	7	4
Marietta	3	15

=== West Regional ===
W.O. Hart Park-Orange, CA (Host: Chapman University)

First round/elimination round 1	Second round/elimination round 2	Semifinals/elimination semifinals	Finals
4	Texas-Dallas	5
5	George Fox	3
Texas-Dallas	6
Chapman	7
1	Chapman	3
George Fox	0
Chapman	3
Pacific Lutheran	4
3	Texas Lutheran	4
6	Pomona-Pitzer	3
Texas Lutheran	8
Pacific Lutheran	9
2	Pacific Lutheran	12
7	Austin	4	Pacific Lutheran	7	0
Chapman	10	1
Lower round 1	Lower round 2	Lower round 3	Lower final
Chapman	12
Texas-Dallas	6	Texas-Dallas	2
Texas Lutheran	3
Texas Lutheran	8
Pomona-Pitzer	8	Pomona-Pitzer	7^{11}
Austin	6^{11}

=== New York Regional ===
Leo Pinckney Field at Falcon Park-Auburn, NY (Host: Ithaca College)

First round/elimination round 1	Second round/elimination round 2	Semifinals/elimination semifinals	Finals
4	Manhattanville	6
5	Trinity (CT)	15
Trinity (CT)	2
Cortland State	1^{13}
1	Cortland State	13
Manhattanville	1
Trinity (CT)	1
Ithaca	8
3	St. John Fisher	6
6	Skidmore	5^{11}
St. John Fisher	1
Ithaca	8
2	Ithaca	10
7	Westfield State	0	Ithaca	5	4
Cortland State	8	9
Lower round 1	Lower round 2	Lower round 3	Lower final
Trinity (CT)	6
Cortland State	17	Cortland State	10
St. John Fisher	3
St. John Fisher	9
Skidmore	2	Skidmore	1
Westfield State	1

=== Mid-Atlantic Regional ===
Boyertown Bear Stadium-Boyertown, PA (Host: Alvernia College/Pennsylvania Athletic Conference)

First round/elimination round 1	Second round/elimination round 2	Semifinals/elimination semifinals	Finals
4	Gwynedd-Mercy	5
5	Frostburg State	3^{10}
Gwynedd-Mercy	9
Kean	13
1	Kean	7
Frostburg State	0
Kean	6
Johns Hopkins	4
3	Johns Hopkins	5
6	Elizabethtown	4
Johns Hopkins	8
TCNJ	6
2	TCNJ	6
7	Wilkes	1	Kean	5	--
Johns Hopkins	4^{10}	--
Lower round 1	Lower round 2	Lower round 3	Lower final
Johns Hopkins	3
Gwynedd-Mercy	9	Gwynedd-Mercy	1^{10}
TCNJ	6
TCNJ	3
Elizabethtown	4	Elizabethtown	1
Wilkes	2

== World Series ==
Time Warner Cable Field at Fox Cities Stadium-Grand Chute, WI (Host: University of Wisconsin-Oshkosh/Lawrence University)

First round/elimination round 1	Second round/elimination round 2	Semifinals/elimination semifinals	Finals
MW1	Wisconsin-Stevens Point	2
S1	Emory	0
Wisconsin-Stevens Point	12
Carthage	8
NE2	Eastern Connecticut State	4
C3	Carthage	15
Wisconsin-Stevens Point	4
Kean	7
ME4	Marietta	4
W1	Chapman	8
Chapman	1
Kean	3
NY1	Cortland State	1
MA1	Kean	4^{12}	Kean	5	--
Emory	4^{10}	--
Lower round 1	Lower round 2	Lower round 3	Lower final
Chapman	7
Emory	5	Emory	16	Wisconsin-Stevens Point	7
Eastern Connecticut State	4	Emory	6	Emory	18
Cortland State	3
Carthage	2
Marietta	3	Cortland State	5
Cortland State	9

== See also ==
- 2007 NCAA Division I baseball tournament
- 2007 NCAA Division II baseball tournament
- 2007 NAIA World Series
