= 2009 NCAA Division III baseball tournament =

- Season: 2009
- Teams: 54
- Finals site: Time Warner Cable Field at Fox Cities Stadium; Grand Chute, Wisconsin
- Champions: St. Thomas (MN) (2nd title)
- Runner-up: Wooster

The 2009 NCAA Division III baseball tournament was played at the end of the 2009 NCAA Division III baseball season to determine the 34th national champion of college baseball at the NCAA Division III level. The tournament concluded with eight teams competing at Time Warner Cable Field at Fox Cities Stadium in Grand Chute, Wisconsin for the championship. Eight regional tournaments were held to determine the participants in the World Series. Regional tournaments were contested in double-elimination format, with five regions consisting of six teams and three consisting of eight, for a total of 54 teams participating in the tournament. The tournament champion was St. Thomas (MN), who defeated Wooster for the championship.

== Bids ==
The 54 competing teams were:

=== Central Regional ===
Brunner Field in the Duane R. Swanson Stadium-Moline, IL (Host: Augustana College)

First round
1	Carthage	8
6	Fontbonne	7
2	Millsaps	5
5	Wartburg	3
3	Wisconsin-Whitewater	3
4	Washington-St. Louis	2

Second round/elimination round 1
Carthage	21
Washington-St. Louis	3
Millsaps	12
Wisconsin-Whitewater	4
Fontbonne	2
Wartburg	4

Semifinals/elimination round 2
Carthage	12
Millsaps	5
Wisconsin-Whitewater	8
Wartburg	3

Elimination final
Millsaps	4
Wisconsin-Whitewater	10

Final
Carthage	2	8
Wisconsin-Whitewater	4	3

=== Mideast Regional ===
Nicolay Field-Adrian, MI (Host: Adrian College)

First round
1	Heidelberg	2
6	Rose-Hulman	12
2	Wooster	5
5	Concordia-Chicago	1
3	Marietta	14
4	Adrian	3

Second round/elimination round 1
Rose-Hulman	8
Adrian	9^{10}
Heidelberg	14
Concordia-Chicago	2
Wooster	13
Marietta	3
Rose-Hulman	2
Marietta	5

Third round/elimination round 2
Adrian	3
Heidelberg	1
Wooster	2
Marietta	6

Elimination final
Adrian	2
Wooster	8

Final
Wooster	4
Marietta	3

=== Mid-Atlantic Regional ===
FirstEnergy Park-Lakewood, NJ (Host: Kean University)

First round/elimination round 1	Second round/elimination round 2	Semifinals/elimination semifinals	Finals
4	Penn State-Behrend	1
5	TCNJ	13
TCNJ	5
Kean	7
1	Kean	10
8	Penn State-Berks	1
Kean	6
Keystone	3
3	Montclair State	2
6	Elizabethtown	5
Elizabethtown	8
Keystone	10
2	Keystone	2
7	Alvernia	1	Kean	12	--
Keystone	6	--
Lower round 1	Lower round 2	Lower round 3	Lower final
Elizabethtown	9
Penn State-Behrend	5	Penn State-Berks	2	Keystone	11
Penn State-Berks	8	Elizabethtown	3	TCNJ	3
TCNJ	5
TCNJ	8
Montclair State	1	Alvernia	2
Alvernia	10

=== New England Regional ===
Eastern Baseball Stadium-Mansfield, CT (Host: Eastern Connecticut State University/Little East Conference)

First round/elimination round 1	Second round/elimination round 2	Semifinals/elimination semifinals	Finals
4	WPI	7
5	Suffolk	6
WPI	15
Babson	5
1	Eastern Connecticut State	6
8	Babson	10
WPI	0
Trinity (CT)	14
3	Trinity (CT)	6
6	Westfield State	4
Trinity (CT)	6
Southern Maine	0
2	Southern Maine	5
7	Husson	4^{10}	Trinity (CT)	5	--
Eastern Connecticut State	4	--
Lower round 1	Lower round 2	Lower round 3	Lower final
Southern Maine	2
Suffolk	2	Eastern Connecticut State	7	WPI	5
Eastern Connecticut State	13	Eastern Connecticut State	18	Eastern Connecticut State	6
Husson	3
Babson	6
Westfield State	3	Husson	10
Husson	10

=== South Regional ===
Arthur W. Perdue Stadium-Salisbury, MD (Host: Salisbury University)

First round/elimination round 1	Second round/elimination round 2	Semifinals/elimination semifinals	Finals
4	Christopher Newport	5
5	Washington & Jefferson	3
Christopher Newport	5
Salisbury	4^{10}
1	Salisbury	3
8	Washington & Lee	2
Christopher Newport	4
Shenandoah	8
3	N.C. Wesleyan	1
6	York (PA)	12
York (PA)	2
Shenandoah	11
2	Shenandoah	8
7	Johns Hopkins	2	Shenandoah	11	--
Johns Hopkins	7	--
Lower round 1	Lower round 2	Lower round 3	Lower final
York (PA)	1
Washington & Jefferson	8	Washington & Jefferson	4	Christopher Newport	5
Washington & Lee	3	Washington & Jefferson	2	Johns Hopkins	12
Johns Hopkins	10
Salisbury	6
N.C. Wesleyan	2	Johns Hopkins	11
Johns Hopkins	14

=== New York Regional ===
Farmingdale State Baseball Stadium-East Farmingdale, NY (Host: State University of New York at Farmingdale/Skyline Conference)

First round
1	Cortland State	10
6	Clarkson	15
2	Ithaca	5
5	Western New England	16
3	Rensselaer	5
4	Farmingdale State	4

Second round/elimination round 1
Clarkson	10
Farmingdale State	19
Cortland State	3
Ithaca	2
Western New England	1
Ithaca	3
Clarkson	5
Western New England	2

Semifinals
Farmingdale State	6
Cortland State	4
Rensselaer	11
Clarkson	10

Final
Farmingdale State	13	8
Rensselaer	9	0

=== West Regional ===
Roy Helser Field and Jim Wright Stadium-McMinnville, OR (Host: Linfield College)

First round
1	Pomona-Pitzer	8
6	Hendrix	3
2	Texas-Tyler	2
5	Chapman	16
3	Cal Lutheran	2
4	George Fox	1

Second round/elimination round 1
Pomona-Pitzer	6
George Fox	12
Hendrix	3
Texas-Tyler	5
Chapman	7
Cal Lutheran	6
Pomona-Pitzer	16
Cal Lutheran	4

Semifinals
George Fox	10
Texas-Tyler	4
Chapman	5
Pomona-Pitzer	2

Final
George Fox	5	4
Chapman	4^{10}	7

=== Midwest Regional ===
E.J. Schneider Field-Oshkosh, WI (Host: University of Wisconsin-Oshkosh)

First round
1	St. Olaf	2
6	Beloit	1^{11}
2	St. Thomas (MN)	5
5	Wisconsin-Stevens Point	4^{17}
3	St. Scholastica	7
4	St. Norbert	6^{11}

Second round/elimination round 1
St. Olaf	8
St. Norbert	4
St. Thomas (MN)	8
St. Scholastica	4
Beloit	2
Wisconsin-Stevens Point	8

Semifinals/elimination round 2
St. Olaf	5
St. Thomas (MN)	2
St. Scholastica	3
Wisconsin-Stevens Point	9

Elimination final
St. Thomas (MN)	6
Wisconsin-Stevens Point	0

Final
St. Olaf	2	0
St. Thomas (MN)	11	5

== World Series ==
Neuroscience Group Field at Fox Cities Stadium (formerly Time Warner Cable Field at Fox Cities Stadium) – Grand Chute, WI (Host: Wisconsin Timber Rattlers)

Upper round 1
C1	Carthage	1
ME2	Wooster	8
MA1	Kean	8
NE3	Trinity (CT)	5
S2	Shenandoah	12
NY4	Farmingdale State	2
W5	Chapman	1
MW2	St. Thomas (MN)	9

Upper round 2
Wooster	14
Kean	1
Shenandoah	5
St. Thomas (MN)	16
Lower round 1
Carthage	10
Trinity (CT)	1
Farmingdale State	2
Chapman	4

Upper final
Wooster	3
St. Thomas (MN)	0
Lower round 2
Shenandoah	8
Carthage	9^{11}
Kean	5
Chapman	7

Semifinals
Wooster	11
Chapman	7
St. Thomas (MN)	3
Carthage	1

Final
Wooster	4	2^{12}
St. Thomas (MN)	6	3

== See also ==
- 2009 NCAA Division I baseball tournament
- 2009 NCAA Division II baseball tournament
- 2009 NAIA World Series
