= 2007 NCAA Division II baseball tournament =

- Season: 2007
- Finals site: Montgomery Riverwalk Stadium; Montgomery, Alabama
- Champions: Tampa (5th title)
- Runner-up: Columbus State (3rd CWS Appearance)
- Winning coach: Joe Urso (2nd title)
- MOP: Jonathan Holt, P (Tampa)
- Attendance: 16,280

The 2007 NCAA Division II baseball tournament was the postseason tournament hosted by the NCAA to determine the national champion of baseball among its Division II members at the end of the 2007 NCAA Division II baseball season.

The final, eight-team double elimination tournament, also known as the College World Series, was played at Montgomery Riverwalk Stadium in Montgomery, Alabama from May 25–June 1, 2007. This was the last of twenty-three consecutive Division II College World Series tournaments played in Montgomery (since 1985).

Defending champions Tampa defeated Columbus State in the championship game, 7–2, to claim the Spartans' fifth Division II national title. Tampa were the first team to repeat as national champions since they accomplished the same feat in 1992 and 1993.

== Bracket ==
=== College World Series ===
- Note: Losers of each round are shifted to the opposing bracket.

First Rounds; May 25–28, 2007	Second Rounds; May 27–May 29, 2007
Nebraska–Omaha	5
Kutztown	4
Nebraska–Omaha	2
Tampa	9
Tampa	13
Cal State Los Angeles	5
Bracket One
Franklin Pierce	0
Southern Indiana	3
Angelo State	10
Southern Indiana	12
Franklin Pierce	3
Angelo State	12
Angelo State	4
Columbus State	5
Columbus State	11
Southern Indiana	2
Bracket Two
Kutztown	1
Cal State Los Angeles	4
Nebraska–Omaha	2
Cal State Los Angeles	4

Semifinals; May 30, 2007
Tampa	8	–
Southern Indiana	1	–
Columbus State	9	–
Cal State Los Angeles	2	–

Championship; June 1, 2007
Tampa	7
Columbus State	2

== See also ==
- 2007 NCAA Division I baseball tournament
- 2007 NCAA Division III baseball tournament
- 2007 NAIA World Series
