= Terry Rupp =

American former baseball coach (born 1966)

Current position
- Title: Athletic director
- Team: Jesuit High School (Tampa)

Biographical details
- Born: April 12, 1966

Playing career
- 1987–1988: U. of Tampa
- 1989: Spokane Indians
- 1990: Waterloo Diamonds

Coaching career (HC unless noted)
- 1993–1995: Oneonta Tigers
- 1996–2000: U. of Tampa
- 2001–2009: Maryland

Head coaching record
- Overall: 415–324 (.562)

Accomplishments and honors

Championships
- 1998 NCAA Division II National Championship

Awards
- 1998 NCAA Division II Coach of the Year

Robert Arthur "Terry" Rupp (born April 12, 1966) is an American former baseball coach. He was the head baseball coach at the University of Maryland from 2001 to 2009, where he posted a 200–244 record. From 1996 to 2000, he coached at the University of Tampa where he posted a 215–80 (.728) record. His overall coaching record stands at 415–324.

In high school, as well as being a baseball standout, Rupp was named a 1984 McDonald's All-American in basketball after leading Tampa's Jesuit High to the Florida Class 3A State Title. Rupp was selected in the 16th round of the 1989 MLB draft by the San Diego Padres and played for two seasons in the minor league. He played for the Spokane Indians in 1989 and the Waterloo Diamonds in 1990. He took over as head coach of the University of Maryland baseball team for the 2001 season.

In 1998, he was named Division II national coach of the year, after guiding Tampa to a national championship. In 2005, Maryland beat top ranked Georgia Tech, and later upset fifth ranked Miami. In 2006, Rupp coached three players who entered the MLB draft. That year, Maryland also won a series against No. 6 Clemson. Rupp won 30 or more games in a season in 2002 and 2008. On May 29, 2009, Rupp announced his resignation as Maryland's baseball coach. He currently serves as the athletic director at his alma mater, Jesuit High School in Tampa, Florida.
