= Irwin Belk Stadium (Wingate) =

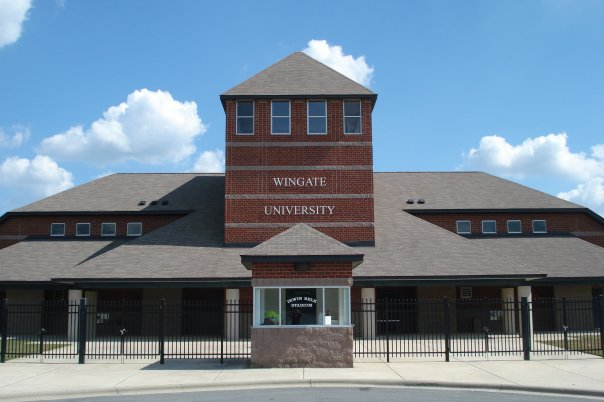
- Main entrance to the stadium

- Location within North Carolina
- Full name: Irwin Belk Stadium
- Location: Wingate, NC
- Coordinates: 34.994566°N 80.445156°W
- Owner: Wingate University
- Operator: Wingate University Athletics
- Capacity: 3,500
- Type: Stadium
- Surface: Artificial turf (2022–)
- Current use: American football Lacrosse

Construction
- Opened: 1998; 28 years ago
- Renovated: 2016, 2022

Tenant
- Wingate Bulldogs teams: football; lacrosse

Website
- wingatebulldogs.com/stadium

Irwin Belk Stadium is a 3,500-seat stadium located on the campus of the Wingate University in Wingate, North Carolina. Opened in 1998, it is home to the Wingate Bulldogs football and lacrosse teams.

The stadium is named for Irwin Belk, who has made significant donations to many colleges and universities in the Charlotte area, including UNC Charlotte and Johnson C. Smith University. The field is named for John R. Martin.
