= Anthony Iapoce =

American professional baseball coach (born 1973)

- Outfielder / Coach
- Born: August 23, 1973 (age 53); Astoria, New York, U.S.
- Bats: Right Throws: Left
- Stats at Baseball Reference

Teams
- As coach: Texas Rangers (2016–2018); Chicago Cubs (2019–2021); Boston Red Sox (2022); Detroit Tigers (2024–2025); Houston Astros (2026)

Anthony Joseph Iapoce (born August 23, 1973) is an American former professional baseball outfielder. He has also coached in Major League Baseball (MLB) since 2016, most recently serving as the assistant hitting coach for the Houston Astros.

== Playing career ==
Iapoce played college baseball at Lamar University and was drafted by the Milwaukee Brewers in the 33rd round of the 1994 Major League Baseball draft. He played in the Brewers organization until 2000 and spent 2002 and 2003 in the Florida Marlins organization, after which he spent 2004 and 2005 playing with the Gary SouthShore Railcats of the independent Northern League.

== Coaching career ==
Prior to the 2016 season, Iapoce was hired by the Texas Rangers to be their hitting coach, a position he held through the 2018 season.

On October 15, 2018, the Chicago Cubs hired Iapoce to be their hitting coach. Iapoce began the 2019 season wearing number 43, but switched to number 4 on June 23 upon the call up of Tony Barnette. Iapoce and the Cubs parted ways following the 2021 season.

On February 3, 2022, Iapoce was hired by the Boston Red Sox to serve as the senior hitting coordinator. On January 9, 2023, Iapoce was hired by the Detroit Tigers to be the new manager for the Triple-A Toledo Mud Hens.

On December 1, 2023, the Detroit Tigers promoted Iapoce to first base coach. On October 20, 2025, it was announced that Iapoce would not be returning to the Tigers for the 2026 season.

On November 13, 2025, the Houston Astros hired Iapoce to serve as their assistant hitting coach. On October 14, 2026, the Astros announced that they would no longer retain Iapoce's services, among a number of changes with the coaching staff.

Sporting positions
Preceded by Dave Magadan	Texas Rangers hitting coach 2016—2018	Succeeded by Luis Ortiz
Preceded by Chili Davis	Chicago Cubs hitting coach 2019—2021	Succeeded by Greg Brown
Preceded by Troy Snitker	Houston Astros assistant hitting coach 2026	Succeeded by TBA
