= Wilder Park (Canyon, Texas) =

Baseball venue in Canyon, Texas, US

- Interactive map of Wilder Park
- Location: Canyon, Texas
- Coordinates: 34.9884°N 101.9115°W
- Owner: West Texas A&M
- Operator: West Texas A&M
- Capacity: 490
- Surface: Astroturf

Construction
- Opened: 2010

Tenant
- West Texas A&M Buffaloes

Wilder Park is home to West Texas A&M baseball. The field is made entirely of AstroTurf and the home dugout is directly connected to the team clubhouse which has a coach's office, laundry facility, and a team meeting locker room. The facility was named in honor of David and Myrt Wilder of Plainview, Texas, who donated $200,000 for the facility to be built.
