= 2005 NCAA Division II baseball tournament =

- Season: 2005
- Finals site: Montgomery Riverwalk Stadium; Montgomery, Alabama
- Champions: Florida Southern (9th title)
- Runner-up: North Florida (3rd CWS Appearance)
- Winning coach: Pete Meyer (1st title)
- MOP: Kyle DeYoung, P (Florida Southern)
- Attendance: 20,039

The 2005 NCAA Division II baseball tournament was the postseason tournament hosted by the NCAA to determine the national champion of baseball among its Division II members at the end of the 2005 NCAA Division II baseball season.

The final, eight-team double elimination tournament, also known as the College World Series, was played at Montgomery Riverwalk Stadium in Montgomery, Alabama from May 28–June 4, 2005.

After losing their first game, Florida Southern won five consecutive games and defeated North Florida in the championship game, 12–9, to claim the Moccasins' record ninth Division II national title and first since 1995.

== Bracket ==
=== College World Series ===
First Rounds; May 28–31, 2005	Second Rounds; May 30–June 1, 2005
Chico State	0
Delta State	3
Delta State	1
Central Missouri State	2
Central Missouri State	5
Florida Southern	2
Bracket One
Chico State	0
Florida Southern	4
West Virginia State	5
Florida Southern	6
West Virginia State	8
Grand Valley State	6
West Virginia State	2
North Florida	5
North Florida	7
Southern Connecticut	1
Bracket Two
Grand Valley State	3
Southern Connecticut	2
Delta State	7
Grand Valley State	11

Semifinals; June 2–3, 2005
Central Missouri State	3	5
Florida Southern	5	8
North Florida	2
Grand Valley State	1

Championship; June 4, 2005
Florida Southern	12
North Florida	9

== See also ==
- 2005 NCAA Division I baseball tournament
- 2005 NCAA Division III baseball tournament
- 2005 NAIA World Series
