= Lindenwood Lions baseball =

Lindenwood Lions
- 2026 Lindenwood Lions baseball team
- University: Lindenwood University
- Head coach: PJ Finigan (3rd season)
- Conference: Ohio Valley Conference
- Location: St. Charles, Missouri
- Home stadium: Lou Brock Sports Complex (Capacity: 700)
- Nickname: Lions
- Colors: Black and gold

College World Series appearances
- Division II: 2017

NCAA tournament appearances
- Division II: 2017, 2021

The Lindenwood Lions baseball team is the varsity intercollegiate athletic team of the Lindenwood College in St. Charles, Missouri, United States. The team competes in the National Collegiate Athletic Association's Division I and is a member of the Ohio Valley Conference since 2022. They will become full members in the 2026 season after finishing the four-year NCAA Division I reclassification period.

== NCAA tournament ==
Lindenwood appeared in the NCAA Division II baseball tournament twice. They went 6–4.

Year	Opponent	Result
2017	Southern Arkansas; Emporia State; St. Cloud State; Central Oklahoma; Delta State; West Chester; UC San Diego	W 14–7; W 12–11 (13); W 10–8; W 8–4; W 4–0; L 2–5; L 6–11
2021	Davenport; Trevecca Nazarene; Northwood	W 6–2; L 4–7; L 5–7
