= Nova Southeastern Sharks baseball =

Nova Southeastern Sharks
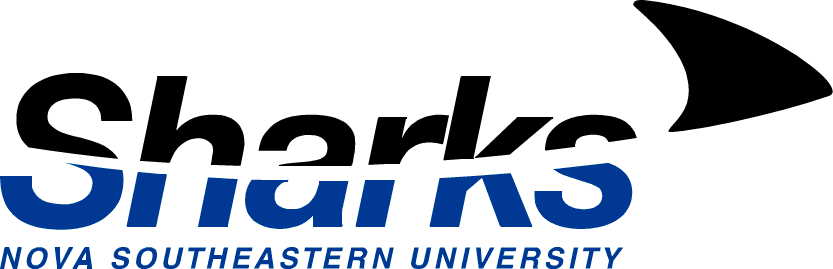
- Founded: 1988
- Overall record: 962-582-3 .623
- University: Nova Southeastern University
- Head coach: Laz Gutierrez (1st season)
- Conference: Sunshine State
- Location: Davie, Florida
- Home stadium: NSU Baseball Complex (Capacity: 500)
- Colors: Navy blue and gray

College World Series champions
- 2016

College World Series appearances
- 2016

NCAA tournament appearances
- 1988*, 1989*, 1990*, 1991*, 1992*, 1993*, 1994*, 1995*, 1997*, 2009, 2011, 2012, 2015, 2016, 2017, 2018, 2019 *=as a member of the NAIA

Conference tournament champions
- 1997*, 2009, 2011, 2012, 2015, 2016

Conference regular season champions
- 1997*, 2012, 2016

The Nova Southeastern Sharks baseball program represents Nova Southeastern University in the National Collegiate Athletic Association's NCAA Division II level. The Sharks have a very short history, having only a small number of years of play under their belt; even having only joined the NCAA as recently as 2003. However, the sharks have won the Division II championship in 2016, led by the coaching of Greg Brown. The Sharks are also known for producing several MLB stars, such as J. D. Martinez of the Boston Red Sox, Miles Mikolas of the St. Louis Cardinals, and Mike Fiers of the Oakland Athletics. After the 2019 season, coach Greg Brown announced his resignation so that he could pursue an opportunity to join the Tampa Bay Rays as a minor league hitting coordinator. Laz Gutierrez, a former roving instructor for the Boston Red Sox was named as his successor.
