= Charleston Golden Eagles baseball =

College baseball team

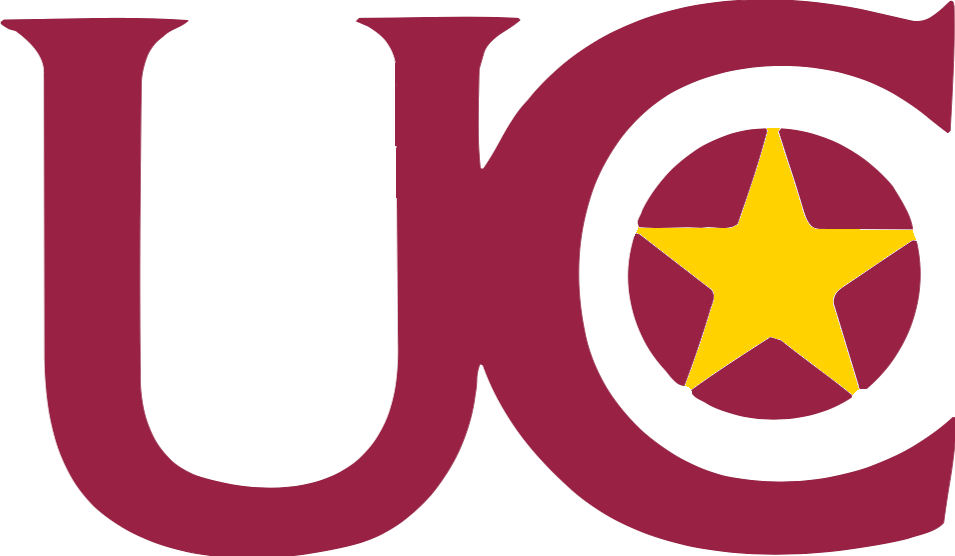
- Founded: 1904; 122 years ago
- Conference history: WVIAC (1925–2013)
- Overall record: 1,278-1,345-9 (.487)
- University: University of Charleston
- Athletic director: Dr. Bren Stevens
- Head coach: Dean Peterson (4th season)
- Conference: MEC; South Division
- Location: Charleston, West Virginia
- Home stadium: Welch Athletic Complex (capacity: 500)
- Nickname: Golden Eagles
- Colors: Maroon and gold

NCAA regional champions
- 2019

NCAA tournament appearances
- 2018, 2019, 2021, 2022, 2023, 2024, 2026

Conference tournament champions
- 1990, 2018, 2019, 2022, 2023, 2024, 2026

Conference regular season champions
- 1948, 1949, 1950, 1951, 1952, 1972, 1981, 1990, 2018, 2019, 2022, 2023, 2024

Conference division regular season champions
- 1973, 1981, 1990, 2018, 2019, 2021, 2022, 2023, 2024, 2025

The Charleston Golden Eagles baseball team represents the University of Charleston in NCAA Division II college baseball. Along with the other West Virginia athletic teams, the baseball team participates in the Mountain East Conference. The Golden Eagles play their home games at the Welch Athletic Complex and they are currently coached by Dean Peterson. The Golden Eagles have won nine division championships, six conference tournament championships, and have made six appearances in the NCAA tournament, including one regional championship.

== Head coaches ==
University of Charleston Golden Eagles Baseball Coaches
Years	Head coach	Record
1948–1957	Verlin Adams	
1958–1962	Sonny Moran	
1963–1964	Bob Maxwell	
1965	Jack Lawhorn	
1966	Tom Kinder	
1967–1969	Clarke Herdic	
1970–2011	Tom Nozica	
2012–2015	Lee Bradley	
2016–2019	Andrew Wright	
2020–2023	Robbie Britt	125-58
2024–present	Dean Peterson	70-35

== Awards and honors ==
=== National awards ===
==== All-Americans ====
University of Charleston All-Americans
Year	Player	Position	Designation
1963	Tom Kinder		Honorable
1978	Ken Samms		Honorable
1981	Jeff Barnes		
1990	Tony Rodríguez	INF	
2023	Kyle West	INF	Honorable
2023	Tyler Dellerman	C	Honorable
2023	Cole Peschl	P	Honorable

== Golden Eagles in the MLB ==
Charleston / Morris Harvey Major League Baseball Alumni
Player	Position	Team	Years in MLB
George Baumgardner	RHP	St. Louis Browns	1912–16
Tony Rodriguez	SS	Boston Red Sox, Seattle Mariners, Chicago Cubs	1996–2001
