= Wingate Bulldogs =

Athletic teams that represent Wingate University

- University: Wingate University
- Nickname: Bulldogs
- NCAA: Division II
- Conference: South Atlantic (primary)
- Athletic director: Joe Reich
- Location: Wingate, North Carolina
- Varsity teams: 25 (10 men's, 15 women's)
- Football stadium: Irwin Belk Stadium
- Basketball arena: Cuddy Arena
- Baseball stadium: Ron Christopher Stadium
- Softball stadium: WU Softball Complex
- Soccer stadium: WU Soccer Complex
- Aquatics center: Wingate University Natatorium
- Lacrosse stadium: Irwin Belk Stadium
- Tennis venue: Wingate Tennis Complex
- Colors: Navy blue and Vegas gold
- Website: wingatebulldogs.com

Team NCAA championships
- 3

Individual and relay NCAA champions
- 2

The Wingate Bulldogs are the athletic teams that represent Wingate University, located in Wingate, North Carolina, in NCAA Division II intercollegiate sports. The Bulldogs compete as members of the South Atlantic Conference (SAC) for 23 of their 25 varsity sports. Wingate has been a member of the SAC since 1989. Two teams in women's sports not sponsored by the SAC—acrobatics & tumbling and flag football (the latter added for 2025–26)—compete in Conference Carolinas.

== Conference affiliations ==
NCAA

- Carolinas Intercollegiate Athletic Conference (1979–1989)
- South Atlantic Conference (1989–present)

== History ==
Wingate University tied for second place in the 2022 NCAA Division II Award of Excellence competition, recognizing its long-running partnership with the United Way Day of Caring.

Wingate University is ranked first among NCAA Division II Academic All-America producing schools for having 125 Academic All-America student-athletes since January 1, 2000.

Wingate University has won the South Atlantic Conference Athletic Excellence Award for the past 13 years. The South Atlantic Conference Echols Athletic Excellence Award is presented annually to the member athletic department that earns the highest overall finish based on final regular season standings. Points are based on final tournament standings in the sports of men's cross country, women's cross country, men's golf and women's golf. The trophy is presented at the SAC Annual Business Meeting at the conclusion of each school year.

Wingate also offers several intramural leagues and tournaments during the school year. Intramural leagues are formed in flag football, basketball, floor hockey, volleyball and soccer. Tournaments are held in billiards, racquetball, sand volleyball and softball, as well as a Punt, Pass, and Kick competition.

== Varsity teams ==
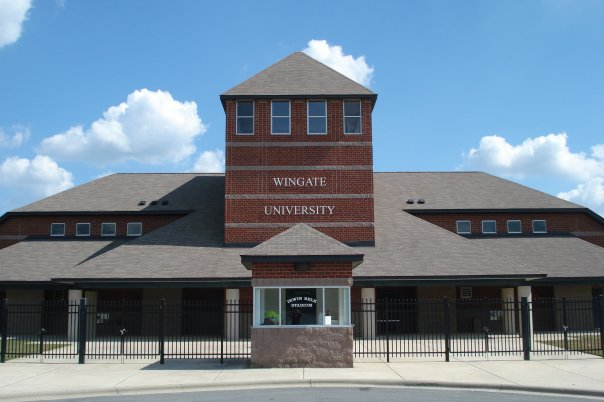
Irwin Belk Stadium, home venue for the Wingate football and lacrosse teams

Men's sports	Women's sports
Baseball	Acrobatics & tumbling
Basketball	Basketball
Cross country	Cross country
Football	Field hockey
Golf	Flag football
Lacrosse	Golf
Soccer	Lacrosse
Swimming & diving	Soccer
Tennis	Softball
Track & field (indoor)	Swimming & diving
Track & field (outdoor)	Tennis
	Track & field (indoor)
	Track & field (outdoor)
	Volleyball

== National championships ==
=== Team ===
Sport	Association	Division	Year	Opponent/Runner-up	Score/Points
Baseball (1)	NCAA	Division II	2021	Central Missouri	5–3
Men's Cross Country (1)	NCAA	Division II	2023	Colorado Mines	70–79
Men's Soccer (1)	NCAA	Division II	2016	Charleston (WV)	2–0

=== Individual ===
Sport	Association	Division	Year	Individual(s)	Event
Women's Swimming and Diving	NCAA	Division II	2008	Maria Vlashchenko	100-yard breaststroke
Women's Swimming and Diving	NCAA	Division II	2012	Lindsey Taylor	1-meter diving
Women's Golf	NCAA	Division II	2026	Amely Bochaton	Individual title
