= Greg Brown (baseball coach) =

Chicago Cubs
- Minor League Hitting Coordinator
- Born: May 4, 1980 (age 44); Hollywood, Florida, U.S.
- Bats: Right Throws: Right

Teams
- Chicago Cubs (2022)

Gregory Thomas Brown (born May 4, 1980) is an American professional baseball coach who is currently an assistant to the GM/minor league hitting coordinator for the Chicago Cubs of Major League Baseball (MLB). He previously served as hitting coach for the Cubs in 2022.

== Career ==
Brown graduated from Lynn University. He played professional baseball in the Florida Marlins organization from 2003 to 2006.

Brown then joined the Houston Astros as a scout. He was the head coach for Nova Southeastern University from 2011 to 2019, before joining the Tampa Bay Rays as their minor league hitting coordinator.

The Chicago Cubs hired Brown as their major league hitting coach after the 2021 season. On October 28, 2022, the Cubs announced that Brown would not return to the role for the 2023 season, and would be replaced by Dustin Kelly.

Preceded by Anthony Iapoce	Chicago Cubs hitting coach 2022	Succeeded by Dustin Kelly
