= Mercyhurst Lakers baseball =

Mercyhurst Lakers
- 2026 Mercyhurst Lakers baseball team
- Founded: 1973
- University: Mercyhurst University
- Head coach: Jimmy Latona (3rd season)
- Conference: Northeast Conference
- Location: Erie, Pennsylvania
- Home stadium: Mercyhurst Baseball Field
- Nickname: Lakers
- Colors: Forest green and navy blue

NCAA tournament appearances
- Division II: 1991, 1994, 1995, 1996, 1997, 2000, 2009, 2011, 2012, 2014, 2015, 2016, 2017, 2018, 2019, 2023

Conference regular season champions
- GLIAC: 1996, 1997

The Mercyhurst Lakers baseball team is the varsity intercollegiate athletic team of the Mercyhurst University in Erie, Pennsylvania, United States. The team competes in the National Collegiate Athletic Association's Division I and is a member of the Northeast Conference since July 1, 2024. They will become full members in the 2028-29 season after finishing the four-year NCAA Division I reclassification period.
