= North Greenville Trailblazers =

- University: North Greenville University
- Nickname: Trailblazers
- NCAA: Division II
- Conference: Conference Carolinas (primary); Gulf South (football)
- Athletic director: Will Lowrey
- Location: Tigerville, South Carolina
- Varsity teams: 20 (10 men's, 9 women's, 1 co-ed)
- Football stadium: Younts Stadium
- Basketball arena: Hayes Gymnasium
- Baseball stadium: Ray & Bea Dillard Field
- Softball stadium: Jan McDonald Field
- Soccer stadium: Pepsi Stadium
- Lacrosse stadium: Pepsi Stadium
- Golf course: Cherokee Valley CC
- Tennis venue: Vance Tennis Complex
- Colors: Black and red
- Website: www.nguathletics.com
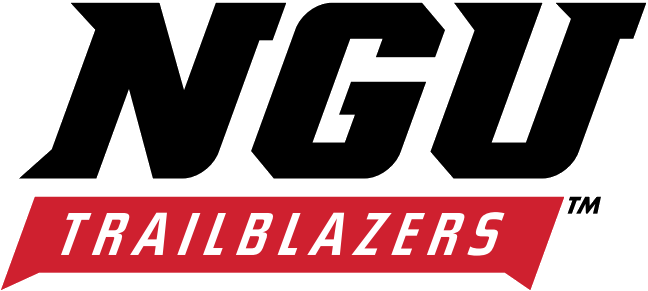

Team NCAA championships
- 1

The North Greenville Trailblazers are the athletic teams representing North Greenville University, located in Tigerville, South Carolina, in intercollegiate sports as a member of the NCAA Division II ranks, primarily competing in the Conference Carolinas (CC; formerly known as the Carolinas–Virginia Athletic Conference (CVAC) until after the 2006–07 school year) since the 2011–12 academic year. They were also a member of the National Christian College Athletic Association (NCCAA), primarily competing as an independent in the South Region of the Division I level. The Trailblazers previously competed as a member of the Mid-South Conference (MSC) of the National Association of Intercollegiate Athletics (NAIA) from 1995–96 to 2000–01.

On April 30, 2024, North Greenville announced that they would change their nickname from the Crusaders to the Trailblazers, effective on June 15.

== Conference affiliations ==
NAIA

- Mid-South Conference (1995–2001)

NCAA

- Independent (2001–2011)
- Conference Carolinas (2011–present)

== Varsity teams ==
NGU competes in 20 intercollegiate varsity sports: Men's sports include baseball, basketball, cross country, football, golf, lacrosse, soccer, tennis, track & field and volleyball; while women's sports include basketball, cross country, golf, lacrosse, soccer, softball, tennis, track & field and volleyball; and co-ed sports include cheerleading.

=== Baseball ===
North Greenville has had 9 Major League Baseball draft selections since the draft began in 1965. The team won the NCAA Division II national championship in 2022.

| Year | Player | Round | Team |
|---|---|---|---|
| 1970 | Ronald Burns | 5 | Mets |
| 1971 | George Gilbreath | 14 | Braves |
| 1985 | Russell Whittle | 28 | Indians |
| 1985 | Mike Montagnino | 27 | Expos |
| 1989 | Riley McKelvey | 60 | Expos |
| 1992 | Chad Brown | 19 | Blue Jays |
| 1994 | Decomba Conner | 7 | Reds |
| 1995 | Herb Goodman | 7 | Reds |
| 2015 | Adam Boghosian | 22 | Nationals |

=== Football ===
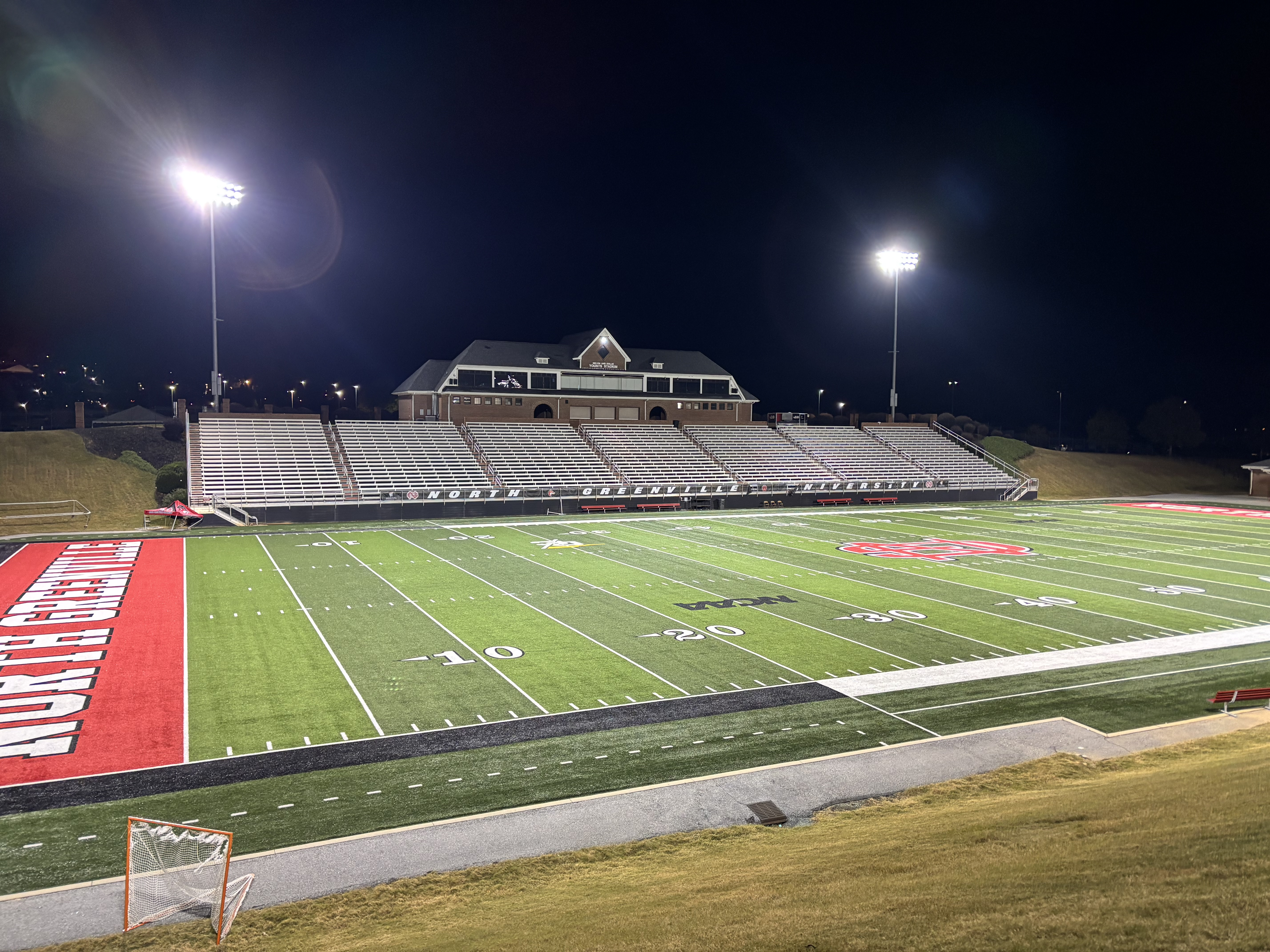
Younts Stadium, football venue

=== Men's volleyball ===
The men's volleyball team advanced to the 2022 NCAA men's volleyball tournament, in which it defeated Princeton and lost to defending national champion Hawaii.
