= Colorado Mesa Mavericks baseball =

Baseball program representing Colorado Mesa University

Colorado Mesa Mavericks
- Founded: 1949
- Overall record: 2165–1059 (.672)
- University: Colorado Mesa University
- Head coach: Chris Hanks (20th season)
- Conference: Rocky Mountain; NCAA Division II Division
- Location: Grand Junction, Colorado
- Home stadium: Suplizio Field (Capacity: 7,000)
- Colors: Maroon, white, and gold

College World Series runner-up
- 2014, 2019

College World Series appearances
- 2009, 2014, 2017, 2019

NCAA tournament appearances
- 1993, 1997, 1999, 2002, 2004, 2005, 2006, 2007, 2009, 2010, 2011, 2012, 2013, 2014, 2015, 2016, 2017, 2018, 2019, 2021, 2022, 2023, 2024, 2025

Conference tournament champions
- 1979, 1982, 1983, 1987, 1992, 1993, 1999, 2001, 2006, 2011, 2014, 2015, 2016, 2017, 2018, 2019, 2023, 2024, 2025

Conference regular season champions
- 1977, 1979, 1982, 1983, 1984, 1987, 1988, 1990, 1992, 1993, 1997, 1999, 2001, 2005, 2006, 2007, 2008, 2009, 2012, 2013, 2014, 2015, 2016, 2017, 2018, 2019, 2021, 2022, 2023, 2024, 2025

The Colorado Mesa Mavericks baseball program represents Colorado Mesa University in the NCAA Division II, in the Rocky Mountain Athletic Conference. The Mavericks play their home games at Hamilton Field. The Mavericks made it to the Division II College World Series for the first time in program history in 2009. In 2014, the Mavericks enjoyed their most successful postseason result to date, making it all the way to the Division II national championship, where they were eventually beaten by Southern Indiana. The Mavericks are coached by seasoned veteran Chris Hanks.

== Notable players ==
- Darrel Akerfelds
- Duane Banks
- Jim Brenneman
- Brendan Donnelly
- Kyle Leahy
- Barry Lersch
- Bligh Madris
- Jake Huff
- Mark Martinez
- Dan Osborn
- Cody Ransom
- Randy Ready
- Sergio Romo
