= West Chester Golden Rams baseball =

West Chester Golden Rams
- Founded: 1889 (136 years ago)
- Overall record: 1537-1078 .553
- University: West Chester University of Pennsylvania
- Head coach: Mike LaRosa (5th season)
- Conference: PSAC; Eastern Division
- Location: West Chester, Pennsylvania
- Home stadium: Serpico Stadium (capacity: 1,000)
- Colors: Purple and gold

College World Series champions
- 2012, 2017

College World Series appearances
- 2006, 2009, 2012, 2017, 2022, 2026

NCAA tournament appearances
- 1983, 1985, 2003, 2004, 2005, 2006, 2007, 2008, 2009, 2010, 2011, 2012, 2015, 2016, 2017, 2018, 2019, 2022, 2023, 2024, 2026

Conference tournament champions
- 2005, 2009, 2010, 2012, 2016, 2024

The West Chester Golden Rams baseball program represents West Chester University in baseball. The Golden Rams compete in the Pennsylvania State Athletic Conference. Led by former head coach Jad Prachniak, the Golden Rams claimed their first national championship in his first year, 2012. In 2017, West Chester claimed their second title. The Golden Rams play their home games at Serpico Stadium, named after Neil Serpico, a former head coach.

The team hosted the Philadelphia Phillies on May 31, 1895, in West Chester for a mid season exhibition game. The Phillies won 14 to 3 in front of 2,500 fans.
