= Angelo State Rams baseball =

Angelo State Rams
- Founded: 1923
- University: Angelo State University
- Head coach: Kevin Brooks (2005-present season)
- Conference: Lone Star; South Division
- Location: San Angelo, Texas
- Home stadium: Foster Field (capacity: 4,200)
- Nickname: Rams
- Colors: Blue and gold

College World Series champions
- 2023

College World Series appearances
- 2007, 2015, 2016, 2021, 2022, 2023, 2024

NCAA tournament appearances
- 2007, 2009, 2012, 2013, 2015, 2016, 2017, 2019, 2021, 2022, 2023, 2024

Conference regular season champions
- 2007, 2012, 2015, 2016, 2017, 2019, 2022, 2023

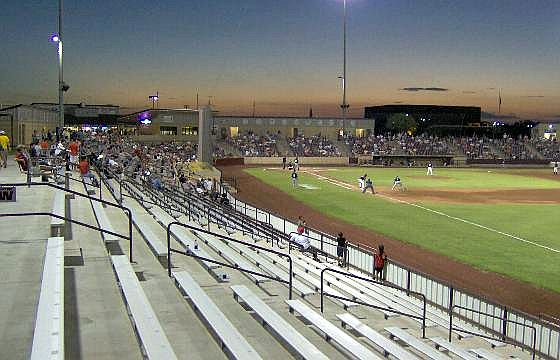
Foster Field at Angelo State University

The Angelo State Rams baseball team represents Angelo State University in NCAA Division II college baseball. The team belongs to the Lone Star Conference and plays home games at Foster Field, an on-campus field.

== History ==
=== 2005 to present ===
The baseball program at Angelo State was resurrected in 2005 after a long hiatus due to continued student requests and support.

The Rams are the fastest team in NCAA history to start a program and advance to the D2 World Series by doing so in their 3rd year (2007). They are the only current Lone Star Conference team to ever make the College World Series (Central Oklahoma in 1997, SE Oklahoma State in 2000, and Abilene Christian in 2003 are the others). The team has advanced to the series seven times in 21 seasons.

The Rams have had over 100 All-Lone Star Conference selections, 40 All-Region picks and 23 All-American selections. 22 former Rams have played or are currently playing professional baseball.

The Rams are currently one of the most consistent baseball teams at the D2 level. 2024 was the team's fourth straight CWS appearance, winning their first national title in 2023, while finishing as national runner-up in 2024.

Angelo State is actively involved in the San Angelo community. Head coach Kevin Brooks and his players regularly engage with local high school and youth athletes. The area also features two high-quality baseball facilities that Brooks and his team utilize and support. Through these efforts, Angelo State baseball has contributed to the growth of baseball at the college, high school, and youth levels in San Angelo.

== Stadium ==
Foster Field was constructed in 2000, and features 4,200 seats, a Triple-A lighting system and an inning-by-inning scoreboard with a video display. It features major league style dugouts and locker rooms and a complete training facility, making it one of the most modern facilities in NCAA Division II college baseball.

In 2015 2.1 million dollars of renovations were made to the facility, including adding an AstroTurf playing field, all new blue chair back seats, and padding the outfield wall. In addition, the ASU Sports Complex consists of two NCAA regulation fields used for practice, along with indoor practice facilities.

== Head coaches ==
Coach	Years	Record	CWS appearances	NCAA appearances	Conference champs
Kevin Brooks	2005–2025	834-364 (.696)	7	12	7

== Selected season results ==
=== 2007 ===
The Rams finished the season with a 51-20 (.718) record, and reached the 2007 Division-II College World Series in only the team's third season of existence, the fastest such trip in NCAA history. For his efforts in 2007, Brooks earned the Sportsman of the Year award from the San Angelo Standard-Times for his outstanding leadership and success on the field.

=== 2012 ===
The Rams went 20–8 in LSC play and won the conference tournament on their home field. ASU hit .321 as a team, and the pitching staff had an earned run average of 3.87 in 457.2 innings. The team outscored their opponents 409–241 in the course of the 57-game season. At home ASU was dominant, going 24–4 at Foster Field.

=== 2013 ===
The Rams advanced to the NCAA DII South Central tournament for the fourth time in 2013 with an at-large bid as the region's fourth seed. ASU went 1–2 at the tournament, ending their season. The 2013 team included ten players who were honored with LSC postseason awards and Lee Neumann who earned the ABCA/Rawlings South Central Player of the Year and was named an All-American for the second straight season. Andrew LaCombe, who was the LSC's first-team catcher, earned first-team Capital One Academic All-American honors.

=== 2015 ===
The Rams advanced to the College World Series for the second time in program history after sweeping their way through the LSC Championship and then winning the NCAA DII South Central Championship by taking four straight elimination games for their second regional title. The Rams were eliminated in the second round with a record of 1–2. The team began the season on a 15-game winning streak. Paxton DeLaGarza, Steve Naemark, Blake Bass and J.C. Snyder were each named All-Americans, and David Goggin earned the Lone Star Conference Academic Player of the Year, and was named the NCAA DII Baseball ELITE 89 winner for having the best GPA at the National Finals. ASU had 13 players earn LSC postseason honors, highlighted by Naemark being named the LSC Pitcher of the Year and DeLaGarza the LSC Player of the Year. Both players were in their first year in the program.

=== 2016 ===
The Rams repeated as regular season Lone Star Conference champions, and swept their way to the D2 World Series, winning four straight games at the South Central Regional to advance in back to back years. The team 2016 broke an attendance record for Division 2 baseball by averaging over 1,200 fans a game. This figure ranked 51st in all of college baseball regardless of division.

=== 2021 ===
The Rams finished 2021 with the first of four trips in a row to the NCAA Division II College World Series. Their conference record was 27–5, regular season 34–6, and overall 44–9. They finished the CWS at 2-2, exiting in the fourth round.

=== 2022 ===
The Rams finished 2022 with a conference record of 38–10, and an overall record of 51–14. They advanced to the NCAA Division II College World Series for the second year in a row, exiting in the second round with a record of 1–2.

=== 2023 ===
The Rams finished the season with a conference record of 40–8, and an overall record of 56-9 en route to their third trip in a row to the NCAA Division II College World Series. The team took their first national championship, remaining undefeated throughout the series. The final DII baseball Power 10 rankings of 2023 listed Angelo State as #1, and the team never slipped below No. 5 from the preseason to final pitch. Kade Bragg was named co-pitcher of the year alongside Mitch Farris from Wingate. Bragg finished the season with a 15–1 record, 1.20 ERA, 0.97 WHIP, 124 strikeouts in 105 innings, and also threw the final pitch of the championship game

=== 2024 ===
The Rams finished the 2024 regular season with a total record of 41-19 and a conference record of 32-16. The Rams didn’t have quite the dominating season as 2023, losing the regular season and conference tournament title to other conference teams. However, the player experience and the coaching prowess of Kevin Brooks helped the Rams dominate the South Central Regional Tournament, going undefeated (beating Colorado Mesa once and West Texas A&M twice) on route to the South Central Super Regional against Lubbock Christian. There, ASU took the series 2-1 against Lubbock Christian on route to their fourth straight D2 World Series appearance.

=== 2025 ===
The Rams finished 2025 with an overall record of 48-10, and a Lone Star Conference record of 39-7, capturing both the regular-season and tournament championships. Their season ended in the finals of the South Central Super Regional held in San Angelo, where the Rams were swept 2-0 by No. 5 UT Tyler in a best-of-three series.

== Kevin Brooks ==
Kevin Brooks is a graduate of Baylor University, earning his bachelor's degree in secondary education while playing baseball for the Bears baseball team from 1988 to 1991. He also holds a master's degree in physical education from University of the Incarnate Word.

Brooks started his coaching career in the Jayhawk Collegiate League, working as a summer coach in 1993, and for the Hays (Kan.) Larks in 1995. The 1995 Larks included Major League Baseball National League All-Star Lance Berkman. With Brooks’ guidance, the Larks finished second in the 1995 National Baseball Congress (NBC) World Series behind the 1996 USA Olympic Baseball Team. He served as an assistant coach at the University of Incarnate Word from 1994 to 1998, and was a volunteer assistant coach at Texas A&M Aggies baseball in 1999, helping the Aggies to the Big XII title in their run to the NCAA Division I College World Series. From 2000 to 2003, Brooks was an assistant coach at the University of Texas-San Antonio in 2000, and an assistant coach at Hardin-Simmons University (2000–03).

After coaching the Rams to the 2023 Division II National Championship, Brooks was named the Skip Bertman Coach of the Year by the College Baseball Foundation.

== Rams in Major League Baseball ==
- Jim Morris – former MLB player for the Tampa Bay Devil Rays; inspiration for the film The Rookie
