= Tampa Spartans baseball =

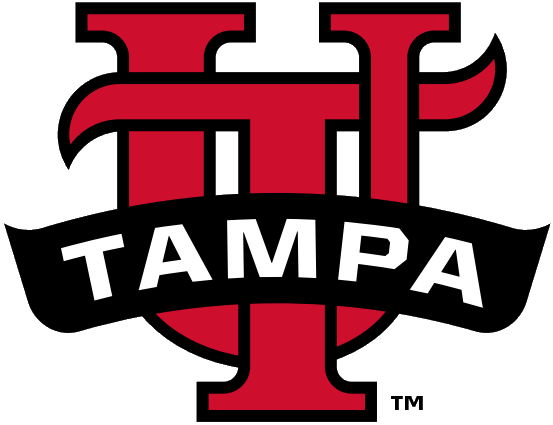
- Founded: 1977; 49 years ago
- Overall record: 2,146–941–9 (.695)
- University: University of Tampa
- Head coach: Joe Urso (24th season)
- Conference: Sunshine State
- Location: Tampa, Florida
- Home stadium: University of Tampa Baseball Field (capacity: 750)
- Colors: Black, red, and gold

College World Series champions
- 1992, 1993, 1998, 2006, 2007, 2013, 2015, 2019, 2024, 2025, 2026

College World Series runner-up
- 1987, 2003

College World Series appearances
- 1986, 1987, 1990, 1992, 1993, 1996, 1997, 1998, 2001, 2003, 2006, 2007, 2008, 2010, 2013, 2014, 2015, 2019, 2021, 2024, 2025, 2026

NCAA tournament appearances
- 1984, 1986, 1987, 1988, 1989, 1990, 1991, 1992, 1993, 1994, 1995, 1996, 1997, 1998, 2000, 2001, 2002, 2003, 2004, 2005, 2006, 2007, 2008, 2009, 2010, 2011, 2012, 2013, 2014, 2015, 2016, 2017, 2018, 2019, 2021, 2022, 2023, 2024, 2025, 2026

Conference regular season champions
- 1987, 1989, 1993, 1997, 1998, 2000, 2001, 2002, 2003, 2006, 2007, 2008, 2010, 2012, 2013, 2014, 2016, 2017, 2018, 2021, 2022, 2023, 2024, 2025, 2026

The Tampa Spartans baseball program represents the University of Tampa in the NCAA's Division II level in the Sunshine State Conference. The Spartans are the most successful baseball program in the history of Division II with eleven national titles, the most recent coming in 2026. The Spartans are coached by Joe Urso, considered to be the greatest Division II baseball head coaches and one of the best college baseball coaches of all-time.

Tampa has reached the College World Series 22 times, reaching the finals 13 times. The Spartans have won 25 Sunshine State Conference titles, including 20 since 2000, and have produced 101 Major League Baseball draft picks. Nine of those players have gone on to play in the big leagues, including Tino Martinez, Ozzie Timmons and Lou Pinella. The program has highly-publicized wins against Philadelphia Phillies in an exhibition game back in 2015 and the Netherlands national baseball team ahead of the 2006 World Baseball Classic.

The Spartans have spent 399 weeks ranked in the top 25, including 298 consecutive weeks from 2005–present. Of those 399 weeks, 119 have been spent as the No. 1 team in all of Division II and 353 weeks have been spent inside the top 10.

== Yearly records ==
Year	Conference	Coach	Overall Record	Postseason
1961		Sam Bailey	9–11–1	
1962		Sam Bailey	13–10	
1963		Sam Bailey	13–9	
1964		Sam Bailey	8–14	
1965		Sam Bailey	12–9	
1966		Larry Gable	16–8	
1967		Larry Gable	8–15	
1968		Larry Gable	10–15	
1969		Bob Dews	13–9	
1970		Dan Sikes	8–11	
1971		Dan Sikes	7–14	
1972		Dan Sikes	15–9–1	
1973		Joe Wiendl	8–22	
1974		Frank Permuy	14–20	
1975		Frank Permuy	10–18–1	
1976		Frank Permuy	21–14–1	
1977	Ind.	Frank Permuy	18–24–1	
1978	Ind.	Pete Mulry	29–13	
1979	Ind.	Pete Mulry	25–25	
1980	Ind.	Pete Mulry	27–18	
1981	Ind.	Pete Mulry	27–19	
1982	SSC	Brian Sabean	27–19	
1983	SSC	Brian Sabean	24–18–1	
1984	SSC	Brian Sabean	37–18	NCAA Regional
1985	SSC	Ken Dominguez	32–17	
1986	SSC	Ken Dominguez	36–23	College World Series
1987	SSC	Ken Dominguez	42–11–1	National Runner-Ups
1988	SSC	Ken Dominguez	31–18	NCAA regional
1989	SSC	Lelo Prado	37–18–1	NCAA regional
1990	SSC	Lelo Prado	45–14	College World Series
1991	SSC	Lelo Prado	34–17	NCAA Regional
1992	SSC	Lelo Prado	42–19	National Champions
1993	SSC	Lelo Prado	43–21	National Champions
1994	SSC	Lelo Prado	36–18	NCAA Regional
1995	SSC	Lelo Prado	41–17	NCAA Regional
1996	SSC	Terry Rupp	45–16	College World Series
1997	SSC	Terry Rupp	46–16	College World Series
1998	SSC	Terry Rupp	46–14	National Champions
1999	SSC	Terry Rupp	33–22	
2000	SSC	Terry Rupp	45–12	NCAA Regional
2001	SSC	Joe Urso	49–10	College World Series
2002	SSC	Joe Urso	36–19	NCAA Regional
2003	SSC	Joe Urso	45–18	National Runners-Up
2004	SSC	Joe Urso	41–16	NCAA Regional
2005	SSC	Joe Urso	40–18	NCAA Regional
2006	SSC	Joe Urso	54–6	National Champions
2007	SSC	Joe Urso	53–10	National Champions
2008	SSC	Joe Urso	42–11–1	College World series
2009	SSC	Joe Urso	40–17	NCAA Regional
2010	SSC	Joe Urso	46–11	College World Series
2011	SSC	Joe Urso	36–17	NCAA Regional
2012	SSC	Joe Urso	38–10	NCAA Regional
2013	SSC	Joe Urso	47–12	National Champions
2014	SSC	Joe Urso	54–4	College World Series
2015	SSC	Joe Urso	43–13	National Champions
2016	SSC	Joe Urso	41–10	NCAA Regional
2017	SSC	Joe Urso	37–12	NCAA Regional
2018	SSC	Joe Urso	42–11	NCAA Regional
2019	SSC	Joe Urso	45–14	National Champions
2020	SSC	Joe Urso	15–7	
2021	SSC	Joe Urso	23–6	College World Series
2022	SSC	Joe Urso	44–13	NCAA Super Regional
2023	SSC	Joe Urso	43–11	NCAA Regional
2024	SSC	Joe Urso	52–8	National Champions
2025	SSC	Joe Urso	55–10	National Champions
2026	SSC	Joe Urso	51–9	National Champions
Overall Record:			2146–941–9	

== Notable alumni ==
- Tino Martinez
- Lou Pinella
- Ozzie Timmons
- E. J. Cumbo
- Joe Urso

=== Current MLB roster ===
Former Spartans on current MLB rosters.

Player	Position	Team
Jordan Leasure	P	Chicago White Sox

== Individual honors ==
=== Division II Player of the Year ===
Player	Position	Year
Tino Martinez	1B	1988
Sam Militello	P	1990
Mike Valdes	P	1998
Lee Cruz	OF	2006

=== National Coach of the Year ===
Player	Year
Lelo Prado	1992
Lelo Prado	1993
Terry Rupp	1998
Joe Urso	2006
Joe Urso	2007
Joe Urso	2013
Joe Urso	2015
Joe Urso	2019
Joe Urso	2024
Joe Urso	2025

=== SSC Player of the Year ===
Player	Position	Year
Brian Zaletel	3B	1992
Rodd Kelley	SS	1993
Ronnie Merrill	SS	2000
Tom Carrow	OF	2001
Lee Cruz	OF	2006
Mike Schwartz	DH	2010
Yorvis Torrealba	OF	2019
EJ Cumbo	OF	2023
EJ Cumbo	OF	2024
Jhoander Irigoyen	DH	2026

=== SSC Pitcher of the Year ===
Player	Year
Ricky Burton	1996
Mike Valdes	1998
Charlie Manning	2001
Eric Beattie	2003
Sergio Perez	2006
Kevin Ferguson	2007
Sean Bierman	2012
Mike Adams	2013
Preston Packrall	2014
David Lebron	2017
David Lebron	2018
Jordan Leasure	2021
Alex Canney	2023
Skylar Gonzalez	2024
C.J. Williams	2025
B.J. Bailey	2026

=== SSC Coach of the Year ===
Player	Year
Joe Urso	2002, 2003, 2006, 2007, 2008, 2010, 2012, 2013, 2014, 2016, 2017, 2018, 2021, 2024, 2025, 2026
Terry Rupp	1997, 1998, 2000
Lelo Prado	1989, 1993
Ken Dominguez	1987
