= USA Baseball National Training Complex =

Baseball complex in Cary, North Carolina

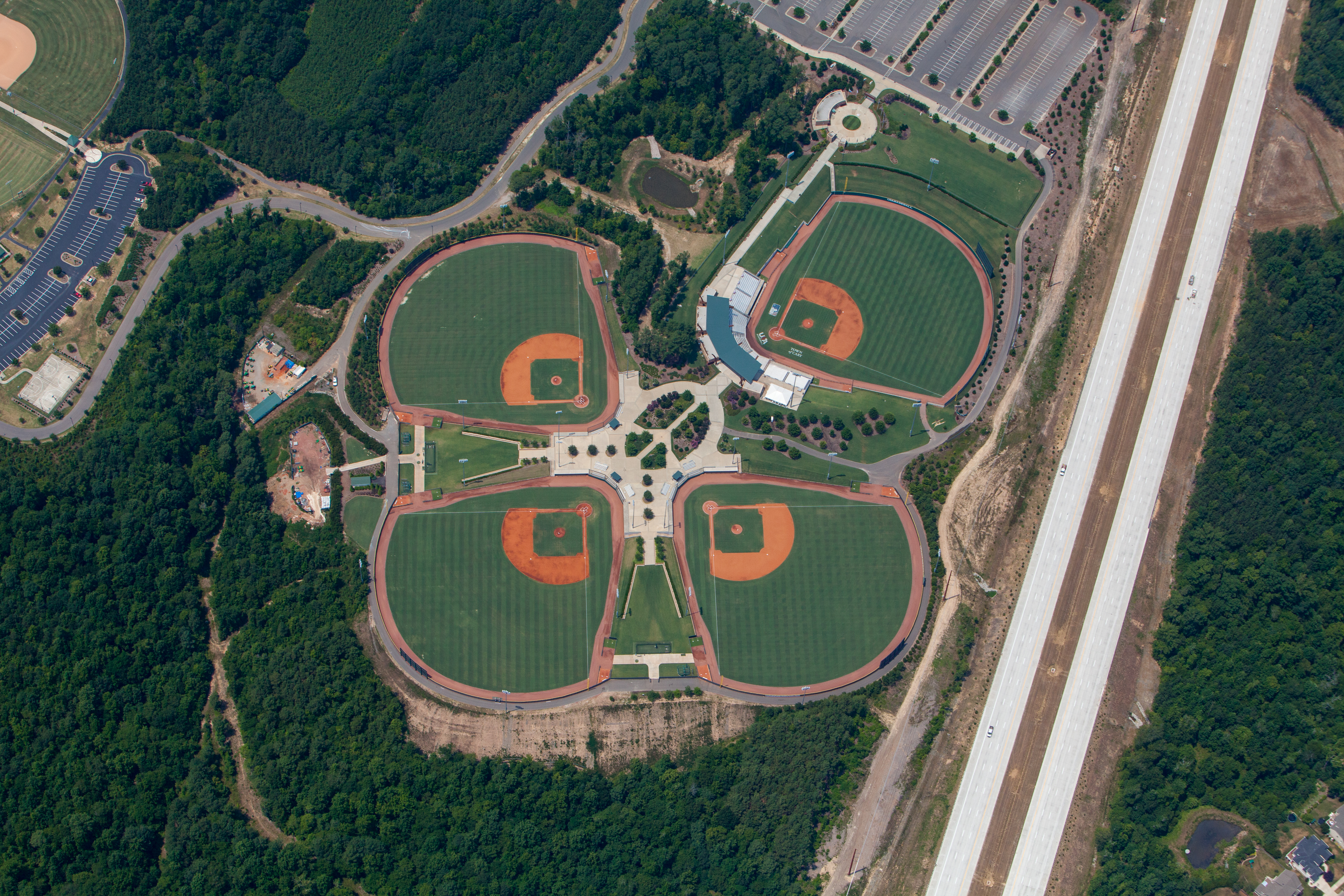
- Interactive map of USA Baseball National Training Complex
- Full name: USA Baseball National Training Complex at Thomas Brooks Park
- Location: 200 Brooks Park Lane, Cary, NC 27513, USA
- Coordinates: 35.7968°N 78.8923°W
- Owner: USA Baseball; Town of Cary
- Capacity: 1,754
- Field size: Left Field: 330 ft (101 m); Center Field: 400 ft (122 m); Right Field: 330 ft (101 m)

Construction
- Opened: June 19, 2007
- Cost: $11,024,691
- Architect: Heery International
- Builder: T. A. Loving Company

Tenants
- United States (National Team) 2007-; North Carolina Tar Heels (NCAA) 2008; St. Augustine's College Falcons (NCAA) 2008-; NCAA Division II College World Series 2009-present

The USA Baseball National Training Complex is located in western Cary, North Carolina, off of Green Hope School Road. The Town of Cary was selected to be the new home of USA Baseball in 2002.

It was home to the St. Augustine's College Falcons baseball teams and was also the home of the North Carolina Tar Heels in 2008. Every June it hosts the annual Tournament of Stars, which features the top high-school talent in the nation. USA Baseball's college national team and several other teams use the complex for games and practice.

Beginning in 2009, the complex was selected to host the NCAA Division II College World Series.

The National Training Complex has four baseball fields (one Stadium Field and 3 Training Fields), with dimensions of 330 feet down the lines, 400 feet in center. All fields are maintained at Major League Baseball standards. Each training field has an individual scorekeeper/announcer shelter and spectator seating for 120 people.

The Stadium Field has a press box that includes two suites, official scorer's room, a sound room and press row. The Stadium has spectator seating for 1,754 people, including handicapped-accessible seating, and additional grass seating for approximately 250 people.

USA Baseball National Training Complex was built in a partnership between the Town of Cary and USA Baseball. USA Baseball has been located at the Durham Bulls Athletic Park since moving from Hi Corbett Field of Tucson, Arizona, in January 2003.

== Location ==
The USA Baseball National Training Complex is located near Mills Park Middle School which is a traditional, large public middle school in Wake County. Locally, the training complex is referred to as "Thomas Brooks Park," as its fields serve as a gathering location for students in the area to convene and recreationally play sports.
