= Troy Trojans =

- University: Troy University
- NCAA: Division I (FBS)
- Conference: Sun Belt
- Athletic director: Kyle George
- Location: Troy, Alabama
- Varsity teams: 15
- Football stadium: Veterans Memorial Stadium
- Basketball arena: Trojan Arena
- Baseball stadium: Riddle-Pace Field
- Softball stadium: Troy Softball Complex
- Soccer stadium: Colley Track/Soccer Complex
- Nickname: "Trojans"
- Colors: Cardinal, silver, and black
- Mascot: T-Roy
- Fight song: Trojans, One and All
- Website: troytrojans.com
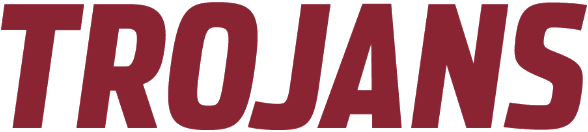

The Troy Trojans are the sports teams of Troy University. Troy State Normal School began its sports program in 1909, when it fielded its first football team. Through the early years, Troy's athletics nicknames were not official and varied by the sport and the coach. Eventually, teams all began to use the name "Troy State Teachers", but when the athletic teams moved into NAIA competition, the nickname was then changed to the "Red Wave".

In the early 1970s, the student body voted to change the name to Trojans after many felt that Red Wave was too similar to the University of Alabama's nickname, the Crimson Tide. Prior to becoming a member of NCAA Division I athletics in 1993, Troy University was a member of the Gulf South Conference of the NCAA Division II ranks. Troy's primary rivals were Jacksonville State University, Livingston University (now the University of West Alabama), and the University of North Alabama. In 2004, Troy joined the Sun Belt Conference of the Football Bowl Subdivision.

They began playing in the NCAA's Division I-A in 2001, became a football only member of the Sun Belt Conference in 2004, and joined that conference for all other sports in 2005. Troy University's athletics nickname was the Red Wave until the early 1970s when the student body voted to change the name to Trojans.

Prior to becoming a member of NCAA Division One athletics in 1993, Troy University was a member of the Gulf South Conference of the NCAA Division II ranks. At the time, Troy's primary rivals were Jacksonville State University, Livingston University (now the University of West Alabama), and the University of North Alabama. The rivalry between Troy and Jacksonville State was arguably the fiercest of those. However, since Troy University moved to Division I-A participation in football and because Troy and JSU no longer share the same conference affiliation, this once heated rivalry has cooled significantly. Troy has Sun Belt rivalries with all East Division schools (Appalachian State, Coastal Carolina, Georgia Southern, Georgia State, and South Alabama). Currently, the Trojans' most prominent rival in all sports is their main Sun Belt rival, South Alabama.

== Sports sponsored ==
A member of the Sun Belt Conference, Troy sponsors teams in eight men's and nine women's NCAA sanctioned sports.

Men's sports	Women's sports
Baseball	Basketball
Basketball	Cross country
Cross country	Golf
Football	Soccer
Golf	Softball
Tennis	Tennis
Track & field	Track & field^{†}
	Volleyball
† – Track and field includes both indoor and outdoor.

=== Men ===
==== Baseball ====
Former Trojans baseball player Shohei Fujita attempting to turn a double play in a baseball game in March 2008

The Troy University baseball team won two Division II national championships in 1986 and 1987 under the leadership of baseball coach, Chase Riddle. One of Troy's most significant victories in baseball came in April 1998 when the Trojans knocked off the #3 nationally ranked Alabama Crimson Tide by a score of 8-4 at Riddle-Pace Field on the Troy campus.

In 2006, Sun Belt Conference Coach of the Year Bobby Pierce led the Trojans to a regular season conference title, conference tournament title, and an NCAA Regional appearance with an overall record of 47–16. The Men of Troy were the 2-seed in the Tuscaloosa Regional in 2006, defeating the Southern Miss Golden Eagles twice, but were eliminated by the Alabama Crimson Tide in the championship game. Following the season, Jared Keel, Mike Felix, and Tom King were selected in the MLB draft. Troy's highest rank of the season was #29 by the NCBWA.

In 2007 the Trojans went 34–27, finishing in a tie for second in the Sun Belt Conference, and were selected as a number three seed in the Oxford Regional hosted by Ole Miss. The Trojans were defeated by Southern Miss and Sam Houston State in consecutive games and eliminated from the regional.

In 2011, the Trojans struck again by winning the Sun Belt regular season title and earning a bid to the Nashville Regional as a 3-seed. The Trojans defeated 2-seed Oklahoma State in the first round, but fell to 1-seed Vanderbilt and Belmont consecutively. The Trojans ended the 2011 season with a 42-17 record. Troy's highest rank of the season was #18 in the Baseball America poll. Troy had also reached a ranking of #25 in the USA Today coaches poll and #22 in the College Baseball News poll.

Troy once again won a regular season title in 2013, this time in a thrilling fashion. The Trojans played #18 South Alabama during the last series of the regular season. After losing the first game of the series, the Trojans went on to win the next two games and clinch a share of the Sun Belt title. They finished the regular season with a 39-16 record. Troy finished the 2013 regular season ranked #21 in the College Baseball News poll.

==== Basketball ====
The Troy University men's basketball team was under the direction of head coach Don Maestri for 31 years until his retirement in 2013. Coach Maestri is the winningest coach in school history, with exactly 500 career wins, and he has won numerous conference coach-of-the-year awards during his tenure at Troy University. The program has won 11 conference championships in basketball, with six of them coming in the Division I era. On January 12, 1992, Troy defeated DeVry University of Atlanta by the score of 258–141 (or 253–141, according to some journalists). This is the highest-scoring game in NCAA basketball history and Troy State's score of 258 is the highest score in NCAA basketball history. The Trojans competed in the 2003 NCAA Tournament in Nashville against Xavier University after winning the Atlantic Sun Conference title.

The Troy University men's basketball team is currently under the direction of head coach Scott Cross. Don Maestri is currently the winningest coach in Troy University history.

The Trojans' last NCAA Tournament appearance was in the 2003 NCAA Men's Division I Basketball Tournament as a 14 seed after winning the 2003 Atlantic Sun Conference tournament. The Trojans faced 3-seed Xavier in the first round, but the Trojans lost 71–59. They finished the 2003 season with a 26-6 overall record. In their most recent post-season appearance in 2010, the Trojans won the Sun Belt Conference regular-season title but lost in the conference tournament final. Because of this, Troy made its way back to the NIT for the second time since 2004, falling to Ole Miss in the first round. In 2004, Troy was an NIT participant in a match-up against Niagara University. In 2008, coach Maestri was inducted into the Wiregrass Sports Hall of Fame at a ceremony in Dothan, Alabama. In 2009, the Trojans finished 3rd place in the Sun Belt Conference and competed in the CBI against College of Charleston. After winning the Sun Belt regular-season title in 2010, the Trojans would be invited to play in the NIT once again against Ole Miss. Maestri is a member of the Troy University Sports Hall of Fame.

The Trojan basketball team is recognized in recent Division I Basketball history for leading the nation in three-pointers from 2004 to 2006, making 1068 three-pointers over the course of 89 games (11.66 per game) during those three seasons. Troy's biggest claim to fame, however, is their game against DeVry Institute of Atlanta on January 12, 1992 when the Trojans came out victorious by the NCAA-record score of 258–141. This is currently the highest scoring game in NCAA basketball history.

==== Football ====
Troy Trojans football player Gary Banks during a game in October 2007

Troy University has fielded a football team continuously since 1946. Troy has won national championships at the NAIA level in 1968 and at the NCAA Division II level in 1984 and 1987.

Troy University football began playing in the NCAA's Division I-A in 2001, became a football-only member of the Sun Belt Conference in 2004, and joined that conference for all other sports in 2005. In 2001, Troy defeated Mississippi State University in Starkville, Mississippi to notch the Trojans' first victory over a BCS level program. On September 9, 2004, the Trojans garnered the program's first win over a ranked opponent when they defeated then #17 ranked Missouri, 24-14, upsetting former Heisman-hopeful Brad Smith's Heisman Trophy chances. Three years later in 2007, the Trojans routed Oklahoma State at home by a score of 41-23. The Trojan football team made its first bowl game appearance in the Silicon Valley Football Classic against Northern Illinois University on December 30, 2004, but lost. The Trojans won their first bowl game on December 20, 2006 at the New Orleans Bowl against Rice University by a score of 41-17. The football program won five straight Sun Belt titles from 2006 to 2010, finishing their run in 2010 with a New Orleans Bowl win over Ohio by a score of 48-21. At the end of the 2014 season, longtime head coach Larry Blakeney retired from coaching. He finished his career at Troy with a 178-113-1 record, 8 conference championships, and 5 bowl appearances. He was inducted into the Alabama Sports Hall of Fame in 2009.

Neal Brown was hired as head coach following Blakeney's retirement. After starting his first season ever as a head coach in 2015, going 4-8, he led a monumental turnaround for the football program in the 2016 season, as the Trojan finished 10-3, including a 28-23 win over Ohio in the Dollar General Bowl. During that season, Troy cracked the AP Top 25 for the first time since the program joined the FBS in 2001. Troy was also the first football program in the Sun Belt Conference to ever receive a Top 25 ranking.

Chip Lindsey was hired after Neal Brown accepted the head coaching position at West Virginia in 2019. Lindsey had an overall record of 15-19 while at Troy. He was fired November 21, 2021 with one game left in the season. Defensive coordinator Brandon Hall served as interim head coach until Jon Sumrall was hired December 2, 2021.

Sumrall previously served as assistant head coach under Neal Brown from 2015-2017. During his first season as head coach Sumrall lead the Trojans 12-2. The Trojans hosted Coastal Carolina for the Sunbelt Conference Championship December 3, 2022 where the Trojans took home a 45-26 victory. Following the championship victory, Troy was ranked No. 24 in the CFP Rankings. This was the first time the Trojans had been ranked by the CFP Committee in program history. Troy also earned a No. 23 ranking in the AP Top 25 and was also ranked No. 24 in the Coaches Poll. On December 16, 2022 Troy defeated UTSA in the Cure Bowl. The Trojans ended the 2022 season with an 11 game win streak.

The Trojans football team has won three national titles: 1968 (NAIA), 1984 (Div. II), and 1987 (Div. II).

==== Golf ====
The Troy men's golf team has a deep history of winning championships. A three-time NCAA national champion, the Trojan men were one of the most dominant golf teams in Division II, making 19-straight appearances in the NCAA Division II Golf Championships from 1975 to 1993. In that span, they managed to win three national championships in 1976, 1977, and 1984.

==== Tennis ====
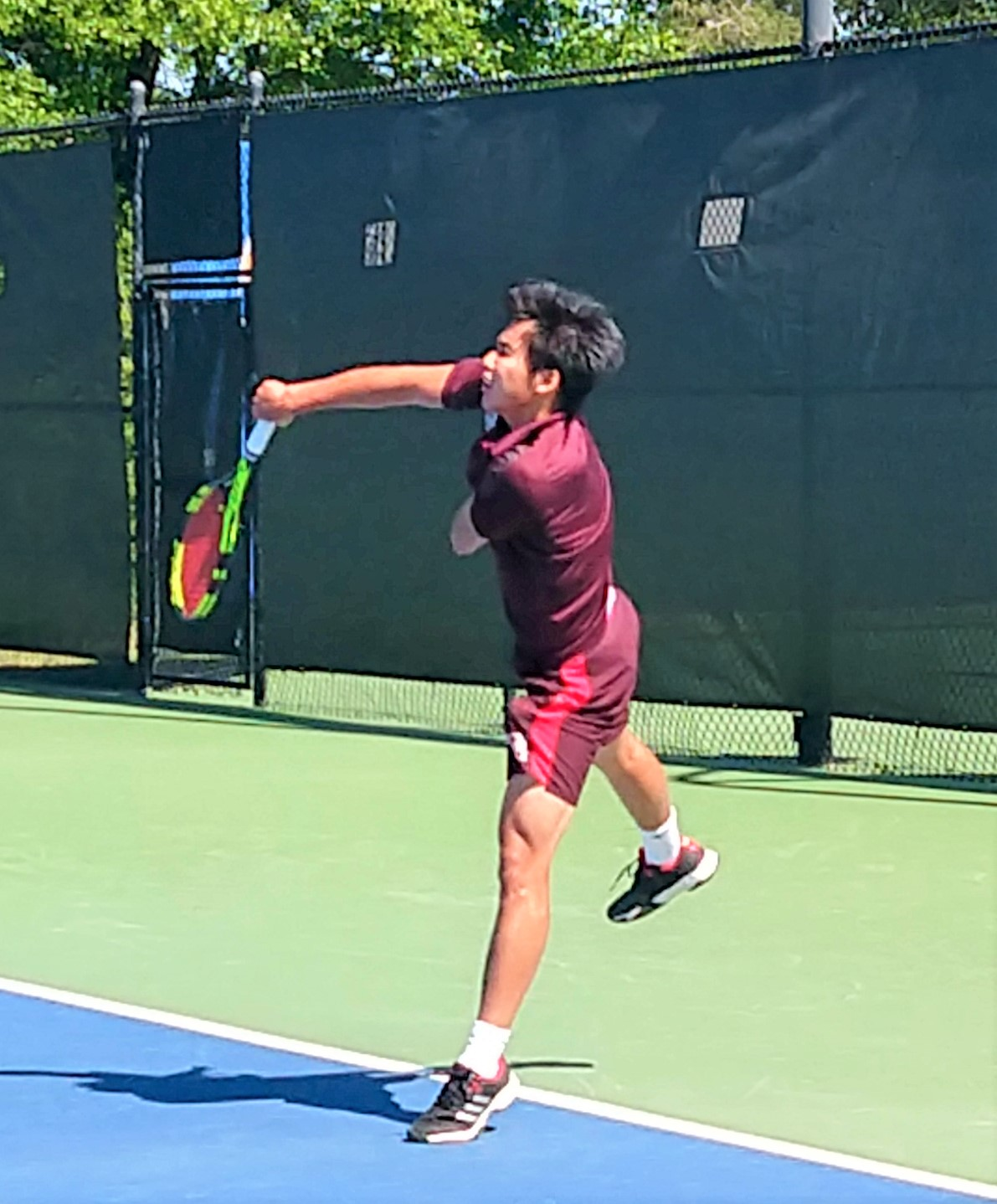
Trojans men's tennis player at the 2018 Sun Belt Men's Tennis Championships

Troy's men's tennis team began to rise to prominence in the early 1990s, after finishing ranked #8 in the nation in the NCAA Division II ITA Rankings. Soon after moving to Division I, Troy still brought their successes with them, winning the Mid-Continent Conference championship.

The team would also go on to win conference titles in 2010 and 2015 in the Sun Belt Conference.

==== Track and field ====
Troy's track and field men's teams routinely feature some of the best athletes in the Sun Belt Conference, as well as the country. Multiple athletes have qualified for the NCAA Championships.

The team won eight Gulf South Conference titles from 1977 to 1986, with head coaches John Anderson, Charles Oliver, and Rick Stetson all being named Coach of the Year a combined eight seasons.

==== Cross country ====
The Trojans men's cross country program has been a dominant team for many years. Troy has won a total of 15 conference championships as a member of the Gulf South Conference, winning titles in 1971 and going on a streak of title runs from 1974 to 1988.

=== Women ===
==== Basketball ====
In 1997, the Troy University women's basketball team, under the direction of head coach Jerry Hester, won the Mid Continent Conference (now the Summit League) tournament championship in Buffalo, New York, and received an automatic berth to the NCAA Tournament where the Trojans traveled to Charlottesville, Virginia, and fell in the first round to the Virginia by a score of 96–74. Under current head coach Chanda Rigby, Troy has been to the NCAA Tournament twice and has won two Sun Belt tournament titles. In 2020, the Trojans won the Sun Belt regular season conference championship for the first time in program history.

==== Soccer ====
The Troy University women's soccer team began in 2003 when the stadium, Jesse H. Colley Track/Soccer Stadium, was first constructed, seating 500. Later, in 2010, the stadium was renovated to include a press box to be used by both the track and soccer team. The field, costing around $1 million to build, measures about 115 yards by 75 yards. The team plays in the Sun Belt Conference, along with: South Alabama, Georgia State, Coastal Carolina, Appalachian State, Georgia Southern, Arkansas State, Louisiana, Texas State, Little Rock, and ULM. Though, they are currently last in the east division with four conference points, compared to the leader's, South Alabama's, twenty-four points. Currently the team is led by head coach Ged O'Connor, and assistant coaches Nicole Waters and the new addition Kayla Saager.

Ged O'Connor, hired in January 2017, is just the seventh head coach in this program's history. O'Connor had prior experience to coaching from being the head coach of the Saint Leo University women's soccer team for eleven seasons. Furthermore, Nicole Waters will enter her third season with the Troy University women's soccer program come fall of 2021. Before Troy, Waters was a graduate assistant at Mercer University for two seasons. She is a Canada native, but after her collegiate career at Dayton, coach Waters played professionally at FC Slovacko Zeny of the Czech Republican league. The newly hired Kayla Saager joined the Trojans in 2020. Her soccer experience includes playing at three colleges in her career (NC State, West Virginia, and Binghamton). Saager will be held responsible for coaching the Troy University's attacking side, specifically.

==== Softball ====
Upon Troy University's athletics moving all sports to the NCAA's Division I in 1993, the Troy softball program was started that same year and officially began their first season in 1994 under head coach Melanie Davis. Under Davis' leadership, the program immediately became a competitive softball program, finishing their first season in Division I with a 40-13 record, including a 4-3 win over an already prominent program in Georgia Tech.

In just Troy's third season of playing softball (1996), the team managed to make history by winning their first ever conference title and receiving a bid to play in an NCAA Regional. The team finished the season with a 47-22-1 record, winning the Mid-Continent Conference regular season title and conference tournament title. The Lady Trojans would receive a bid to play in the NCAA Play-In Series versus Southeast Missouri State, where they would sweep the Redhawks by scores of 3-2 and 1-0. The ladies would then receive a bid to play in the NCAA West Regional as the #4 seed. In their first game against Arizona, the Trojans were outmatched, losing 0-8 to the Wildcats. The Trojans were knocked out of the tournament after dropping a heartbreaker against South Florida, 5-6.

The Trojans are currently coached by Beth Mullins, who is in her 4th season.

==== Volleyball ====
The Troy women's volleyball team has won three conference tournament championships, one regular season championship, and two conference divisional championships in their history. In 2019, the Trojans advanced to the Second Round of the National Invitational Volleyball Championship, defeating North Carolina A&T in the first round, before falling to Georgia Tech in the second round.

==== Tennis ====
The Troy men's and women's tennis teams have a short but successful history in the sport. The women have won conference championships in the Atlantic Sun Conference and the Sun Belt Conference and received national rankings in various years. The men's team has won the 2010 and 2015 Sun Belt titles, finishing with rankings as high as #51 in the nation.

==== Women's golf ====
Like the men's golf team, the women's golf team has a deep history of winning as well. In the NCAA's Division II, the Troy State women's golf team was one of the strongest teams in the nation in the 1980s, winning three national championships in 1984, 1986, and 1989. Despite the shorter history of the women's team, they've established themselves as proven winners. The women have been successful recently, capturing three Sun Belt Conference titles and also receiving an individual at-large NCAA Regional berth for player Fátima Fernández Cano in 2016.

==== Cross country ====
The women's cross country team was dominant while a member of the Gulf South Conference, winning the conference title five-straight years from 1982 to 1986.

== Defunct programs ==
=== Rodeo ===
Troy University had one of the top collegiate rodeo programs in the nation during its existence. In 2007, Troy calf roper Ben Mayworth won the calf roping national championship at the National Finals College Rodeo in Casper, Wyoming. The rodeo program's home facility was the Pike County Cattlemen's Arena in Troy where it hosted a three-day rodeo each October that featured college rodeo programs from throughout the southern region of the United States.

The university discontinued its rodeo program at the end of the 2014 season.

== National championships ==
Troy has won 14 NCAA national championships across five different sports, as well as 2 NAIA national championships.

=== Team ===
Sun Belt Conference logo in Troy's colors

- Football
  - 1968 NAIA National Champions
  - 1984 NCAA Division II National Champions
  - 1987 NCAA Division II National Champions
- Baseball
  - 1986 NCAA Division II National Champions
  - 1987 NCAA Division II National Champions
- Men's Basketball
  - 1993 NCAA Division II National Finalists
- Men's Golf
  - 1976 NCAA Division II National Champions
  - 1977 NCAA Division II National Champions
  - 1978 NCAA Division II National Finalists
  - 1983 NCAA Division II National Finalists
  - 1984 NCAA Division II National Champions
  - 1992 NCAA Division II National Finalists
- Women's Golf
  - 1984 NCAA Division II National Champions
  - 1986 NCAA Division II National Champions
  - 1989 NCAA Division II National Champions

=== Individual ===
- Men's Golf
  - 1980 NCAA Division II Individual National Champion - Paul Perini
- Men's Track & Field
  - 1976 NAIA 400-meter dash National Champion - Charles Oliver
- Men's Rodeo
  - 2007 College National Finals Rodeo National Champion (tie-down roping) - Ben Mayworth

== Facilities ==
Image	Name	Sport	Capacity	Opened
	Veterans Memorial Stadium	Football	30,402	1950
	Trojan Arena	Men's basketball Women's basketball Volleyball; Indoor track & field	6,000	2012
	Riddle-Pace Field	Baseball	2,000	1931
	Troy Softball Complex	Softball	800	2002
	Troy Golf Practice Facility	Men's golf Women's golf	-	2014
	Colley Track/Soccer Complex	Women's soccer Outdoor track & field	500	2003
	Jimmy Lunsford Tennis Complex	Men's tennis Women's tennis	150	2001
