= Columbus State Cougars =

Intercollegiate sports teams of Columbus State University

- University: Columbus State University
- Conference: Peach Belt (primary)
- NCAA: Division II
- Athletic director: Justin Hay
- Location: Columbus, Georgia
- Varsity teams: 16 (7 men's, 8 women's, 1 co-ed)
- Basketball arena: Frank G. Lumpkin Jr. Center
- Baseball stadium: Burger King Stadium at Ragsdale Field
- Softball stadium: Cougar Field
- Soccer stadium: Walden Soccer Complex
- Tennis venue: John W. Walden Tennis Center
- Mascot: Cody Cougar
- Nickname: Cougars
- Colors: Columbus State Blue and Columbus State Red
- Website: csucougars.com
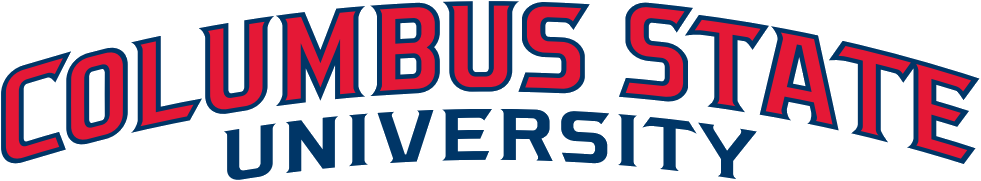

Team NCAA championships
- 5

Individual and relay NCAA champions
- 3

The Columbus State Cougars are the athletic teams that represent Columbus State University, located in Columbus, Georgia, in intercollegiate sports at the Division II level of the National Collegiate Athletic Association (NCAA), primarily competing in the Peach Belt Conference since the 1990–91 academic year.

Columbus State competes in sixteen intercollegiate varsity sports. Men's sports include baseball, basketball, cross country, golf, tennis, and track and field; while women's sports include basketball, cross country, golf, soccer, softball, tennis, and track and field. The school also offers a cheer team.

== Conference affiliations ==
NCAA

- Peach Belt Conference (1990–present)

== Sponsored sports ==
The Cougars competed in women's volleyball from 2013 to 2016, compiling a 54–65 record over four seasons.

Men's sports	Women's sports
Baseball	Basketball
Basketball	Cross country
Cross country	Golf
Golf	Soccer
Tennis	Softball
Track and field	Tennis
	Track and field

=== Baseball ===
The Columbus State baseball team has made eight appearances to the NCAA Division II Baseball Championship, twenty-four NCAA Regional Championship appearances, and is frequently in the NCSWA National Top 30 Poll. The Cougars won the 2002 NCAA Division II World Series and were the national runner-up at the 1986, 2007 and 2018 NCAA Division II World Series.

==== NCAA Division II Baseball Championship ====
- 1984
- 1986 – Runner-Up
- 1987
- 1990
- 2002 – Champions
- 2004
- 2007 – Runner-up
- 2018 – Runner-up

==== NCAA Regional Championship ====
- 1975
- 1976
- 1977
- 1979
- 1980
- 1981
- 1983
- 1984
- 1986
- 1987
- 1988
- 1990
- 1992
- 1994
- 1996
- 1998
- 2002
- 2004
- 2006
- 2007
- 2008
- 2010
- 2011

=== Golf ===
The CSU golf team has won six NCAA National Championships; 1978, 1980, 1989, 1992, 1994 and 1997.

=== Rifle ===
In April 2015, the school's co-ed rifle program was discontinued after existing for six seasons. Prior to discontinuation the team competed at the Division I level as members of the Ohio Valley Conference starting in the 2012–13 school year.

Former assistant rifle coach, Jamie Gray, won the gold medal at the 2012 London Olympics in the Women's 50 meter rifle three positions event with a score of 691.9.

Columbus State Athletics Department co-hosted the 2011 Rifle National Championship with Fort Benning. This was the first time a national championship was hosted on CSU's campus.

=== Women's Soccer ===
The Lady Cougar soccer team has made 13 consecutive NCAA Tournaments since 2006, just its third season in existence. Columbus State has won or shared 12 of the last 14 Peach Belt Conference regular season championships, making 12 PBC Tournament championship games in that span and winning eight (2006–08, 2010, 2014–16, 2018). Head coach Jay Entlich, a seven-time PBC Coach of the Year (2005, 2008, 2014–18), has guided the Lady Cougars since their 2004 inception.

==== NCAA Division II Southeast Region Championships (6) ====
- 2007
- 2008
- 2014
- 2015 – National Runner-Up
- 2016 – National Semifinals
- 2018

== National championships ==
=== Team ===
Association	Division	Sport	Year	Rival	Score
NCAA	Division II	Men's Golf	1992	Troy State	1,144–1,176
NCAA	Division II	Men's Golf	1994	North Florida	1,175–1,179
NCAA	Division II	Men's Golf	1997	North Florida	1,149–1,153
NCAA	Division II	Baseball	2002	Chico State	5–3
NCAA	Division II	Men's Tennis	2018	Barry	5–4

=== Individual ===
Association	Division	Sport	Year	Individual(s)	Event	Score
NCAA	Division II	Men's Golf	1991	Clete Cole	Individual Title	287
NCAA	Division II	Men's Golf	1992	Diego Ventureira	Individual Title	285
NCAA	Division II	Men's Golf	2007	Christian Ries	Individual Title	286

== Notable alumni ==
=== Baseball ===
- Jason Rogers
- Kolton Ingram

=== Men's basketball ===
- Kenney Funderburk
- Ty Harris
- Matthías Orri Sigurðarson

=== Softball ===
- Nathalie Fradette
