= Troy Trojans men's tennis =

Men's tennis team representing Troy University (Troy, Alabama, U.S.)

- University: Troy University
- Athletic director: Brent Jones
- Head coach: Rolando Vargas (6th season)
- Conference: Sun Belt
- Location: Troy, AL
- Home Court: Lunsford Tennis Complex
- Nickname: Trojans
- Colors: Cardinal, silver, and black

NCAA Tournament appearances
- 1993, 2010, 2015

Conference Tournament championships
- 1963, 1967, 1972, 1993, 1997, 2010, 2015

Conference regular season champions
- 2005, 2015

The Troy Trojans men's tennis team represents Troy University in NCAA Division I college tennis. The team belongs to the Sun Belt Conference and plays home matches at the Jimmy Lunsford Tennis Complex. The Trojans are currently led by head coach Rolando Vargas.

== History ==
Troy began playing tennis during the 1980s, first playing in the NCAA's Division II and joining the Gulf South Conference. The Trojans never won a conference title while a member of the Gulf South Conference, but on a few occasions finished as the conference runner-up.

In 1993 during their last season in Division II, the men's team made it the NCAA Division II Championships. The Trojans wound up having a stellar season as they finished ranked #8 in the nation in the Rolex Collegiate National Rankings. That same year, Juan Garat was nominated as an ITA All-American in singles.

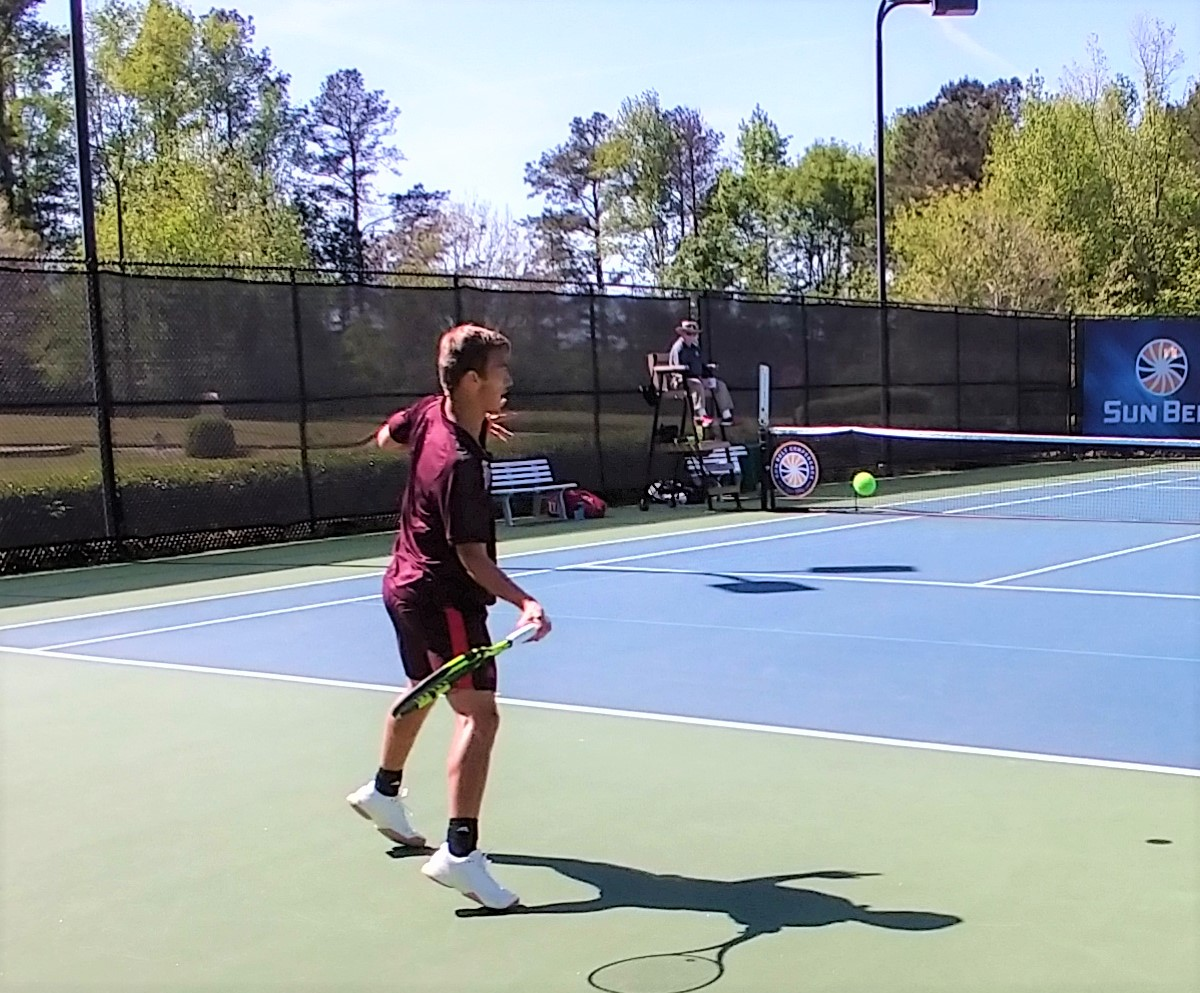
A Troy tennis player during the 2018 Sun Belt Conference Championships.

Troy transitioned from Division II to Division I after the 1993 season, moving to the Mid-Continent Conference.

While a member of the Mid-Continent Conference, Troy finished as the conference runner-up in 1995 and 1996, losing in the finals of the conference tournament to Western Illinois both seasons. For the 1996 season, Troy player Anshooman Aga was named the Mid-Continent's Player of the Year.

In 1997, Troy finally broke through to win the conference title, defeating UMKC in the conference tournament finals. Troy player Shannon Nettle was named Mid-Con Newcomer of the Year, and head coach Steve Barsby was named Mid-Con Coach of the Year for his efforts. Unfortunately, Troy did not receive a bid to play in the NCAA Tournament since at the time, the Mid-Con didn't give their tournament champion an automatic bid to the national tournament.

The men's tennis team won their first Sun Belt title in 2010, defeating #34 Denver 4–1 in the finals of the Sun Belt tournament. Troy would lose in the NCAA Regionals to Auburn by a score of 0–4 in the first round. They finished the regular season with a 20–5 record and ranked #51 in nation in the ITA Rankings. For his efforts, head coach Eric Hayes was named the Wilson/ITA Southern Coach of the Year, as well the Sun Belt Conference Coach of the Year.

In 2015 under second year head coach Scott Kidd, the men's team found their way back to the NCAA Tournament by posting a 25–6 overall record and winning the Sun Belt tournament once again, this time defeating #69 South Alabama in the finals by a score of 4–1. Their 25–6 overall record led the nation in most wins going into the 2015 postseason before dropping their First Round match against Florida State. Their 4–5 record against ranked teams helped them achieve a national ranking of #53 to finish the regular season.

== ITA All-Americans ==
- Juan Garat (Singles) – 1993

== Awards ==
Coach of the Year
- USPTA College Coach of the Year

Chad Hebert – 2000

- USPTA Southern College Coach of the Year

Rolando Vargas – 2022

- Wilson/ITA Southern Coach of the Year

Eric Hayes – 2010

- Sun Belt Coach of the Year

Eric Hayes – 2010
Scott Kidd – 2015

- Atlantic Sun Coach of the Year

Steve Barsby – 1997

Player of the Year
- Atlantic Sun Player of the Year

William Campos – 1997
Irving Morales – 2004, 2005

- Mid-Continent Player of the Year

Anshooman Aga – 1996

== Year-by-Year Results ==
| Season | Overall record | Conference record | Conference standing | Postseason | Final nat'l rank | Notes |
|---|---|---|---|---|---|---|
| 1993 | 16–5 | | | NCAA First Round | #8 | NCAA Championships |
| 1994 | 12–8 | | 2nd | | | East Coast Runner-up |
| 1995 | 11–6 | 2–1 | 2nd | | | Mid-Continent League Runner-up |
| 1996 | 7–15 | 2–1 | 2nd | | | Mid-Continent League Runner-up |
| 1997 | 15–7 | 4–1 | 1st | | | Mid-Continent League Champions |
| 1998 | 14–8 | 1–1 | 4th | | | |
| 1999 | 11–12 | 1–1 | 4th | | | |
| 2000 | 14–10 | 0–0 | 5th | | | |
| 2001 | 0–0 | 0–0 | 4th | | | |
| 2002 | 7–9 | 0–0 | 7th | | | |
| 2003 | 11–10 | 0–0 | 3rd | | | |
| 2004 | 9–14 | 2–2 | 6th | | | |
| 2005 | 10–10 | 6–1 | 1st | | | Atlantic Sun Champions |
| 2006 | 8–12 | 0–2 | 6th | | | |
| 2007 | 5–10 | 2–4 | 6th | | | |
| 2008 | 5–13 | 1–3 | 7th | | | |
| 2009 | 8–12 | 1–2 | 7th | | | |
| 2010 | 20–5 | 4–1 | 1st | NCAA First Round | #58 | Sun Belt Champions; NCAA First Round |
| 2011 | 3–17 | 0–1 | 6th | | | |
| 2012 | 5–18 | 0–2 | 7th | | | |
| 2013 | 8–17 | 0–4 | 6th | | | |
| 2014 | 8–17 | 0–2 | 5th | | | |
| 2015 | 25–7 | 5–0 | 1st | NCAA First Round | #63 | Sun Belt Champions; NCAA First Round |
| 2016 | 15–14 | 1–3 | 3rd | | | |
| 2017 | 14–11 | 1–1 | 4th | | | |
| 2018 | 13–11 | 3–1 | 4th | | | |
| 2019 | 17–8 | 1–6 | 7th | | | |
| 2020 | 11–4 | 0–0 | – | | | Season cancelled due to COVID-19 |
| 2021 | 20–4 | 3–2 | 2nd | | | |
| 2022 | 16–10 | 2–3 | 5th | | | |
| 2023 | 18-7 | 4-4 | 4th | | | |
| TOTALS | 351–308 | 46–49 | | | | |

== Postseason results ==
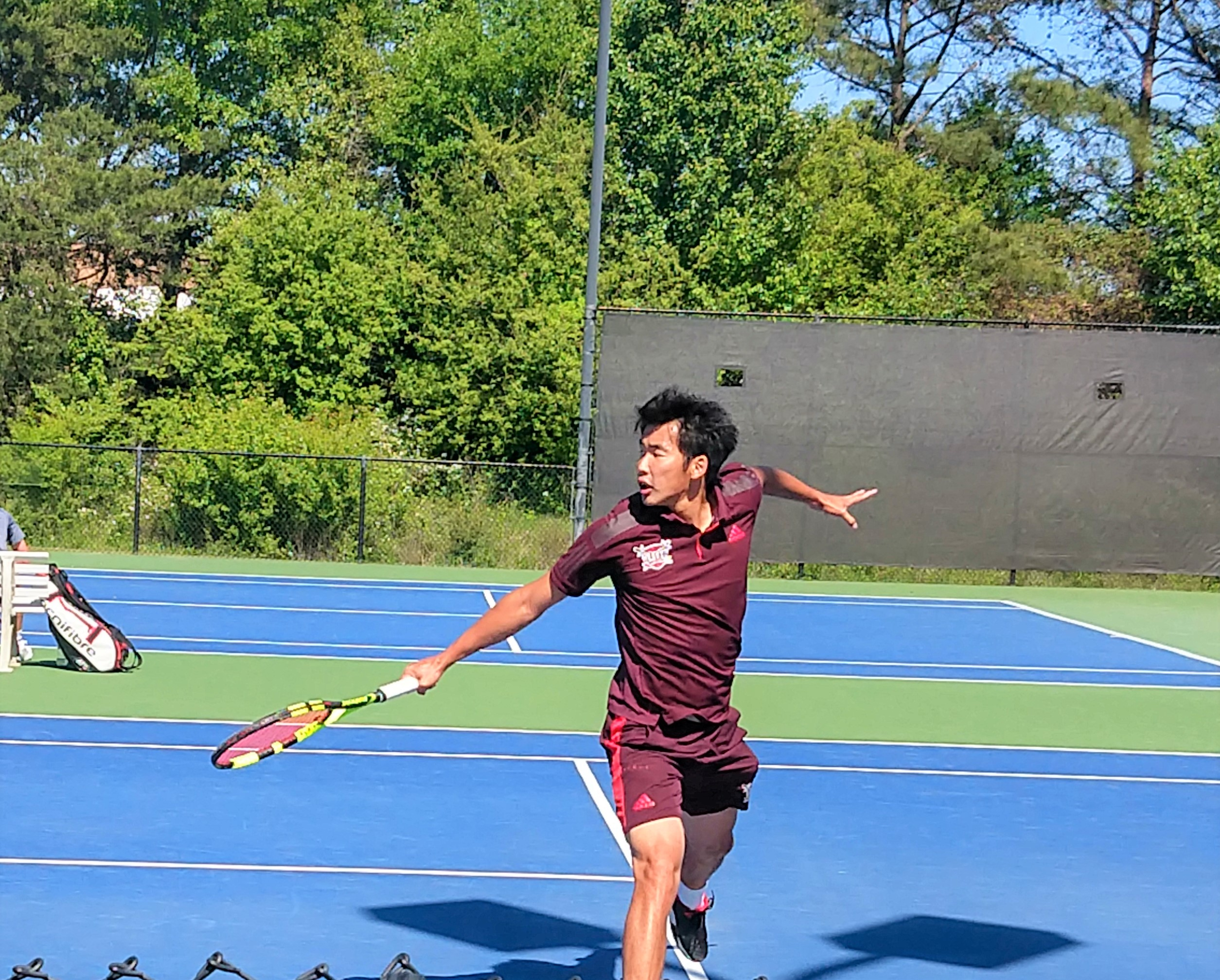
Trojans men's tennis player at the 2018 Sun Belt Men's Tennis Championships.

=== Division I ===
| Year | Round | Opponent | Result/Score |
|---|---|---|---|
| 2010 | First Round | Auburn | L 0–4 |
| 2015 | First Round | Florida State | L 0–4 |

=== Division II ===
| Year | Round | Opponent | Result/Score |
|---|---|---|---|
| 1993 | First Round | UC-Davis | L 1–5 |

== ITA Final Rankings ==
| Year | Record | ITA National Ranking | ITA Regional Ranking |
|---|---|---|---|
| 1993 | 16–5 | #8 | |
| 2010 | 20–5 | #58 | #6 |
| 2015 | 25–7 | #63 | #6 |
| 2016 | 15–14 | | #10 |
| 2019 | 17–8 | | #9 |
| 2021 | 20–4 | | #8 |
| 2022 | 16-10 | | #9 |
| 2023 | 18–7 | | #10 |

Source: "Oracle/ITA Rankings Archives". Intercollegiate Tennis Association.

== Trojans on the ATP Tour ==
- Rolando Vargas
- Juan Garat
- Shannon Nettle
- Luis Henrique Grangeiro

== Facilities ==
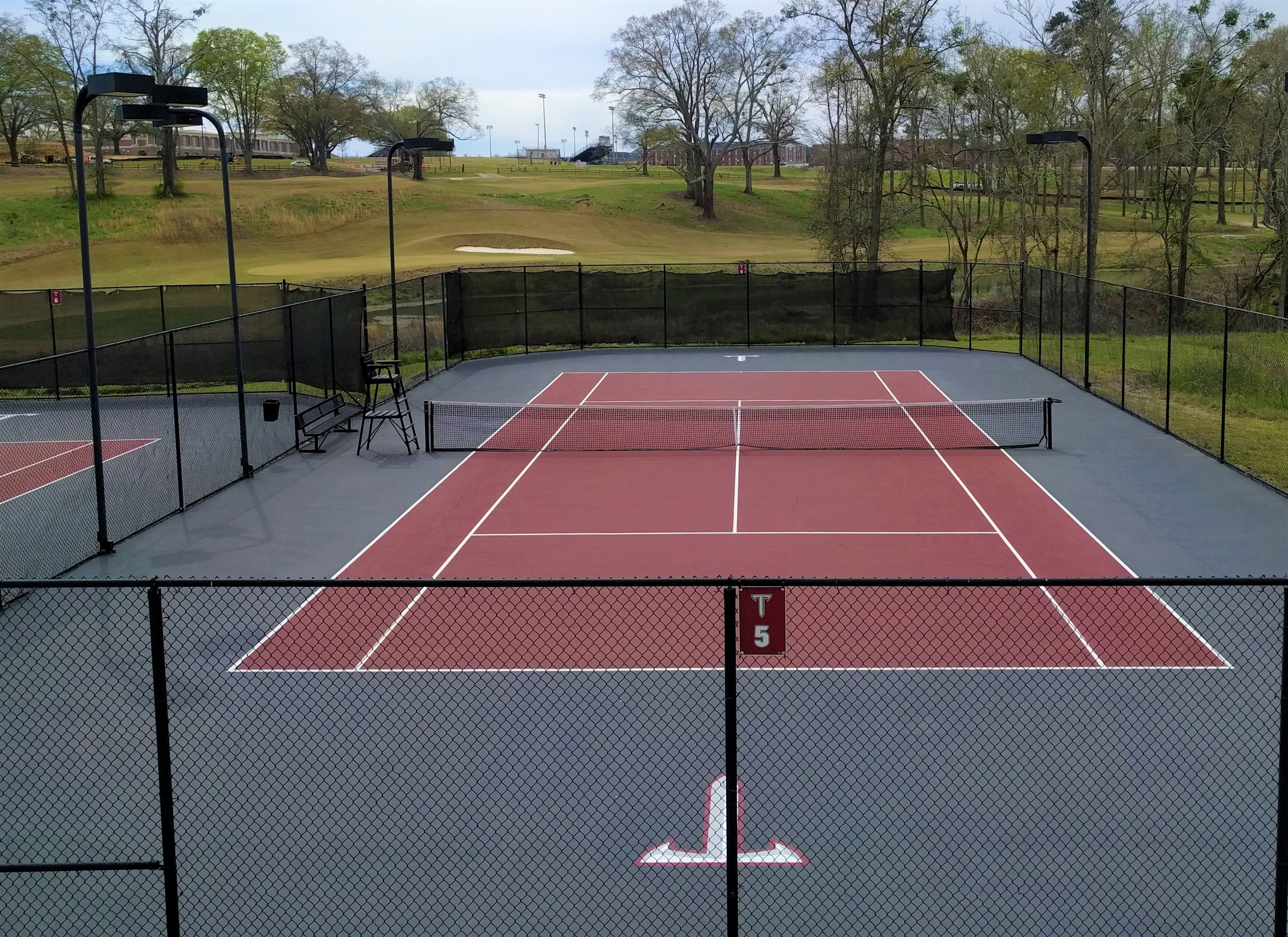
A tennis court at the Lunsford Tennis Complex.

Troy tennis plays their home matches at the Jimmy Lunsford Tennis Complex. Opened in 2001, the facility contains 12 outdoor hard courts with a small clubhouse/pro shop. The facility hosts various USTA junior and adult tournaments, as well as a $25,000 professional women's tennis tournament, the USTA Tennis Classic of Troy.
