= Rolando Vargas =

Tennis coach

Current position
- Title: Head coach
- Team: Troy Trojans
- Conference: SBC
- Record: 145–53

Biographical details
- Education: Troy University

Coaching career (HC unless noted)
- 2007–2009: Troy (assistant): student asst. (2004)
- 2010–2017: Auburn-Montgomery
- 2017–2018: Radford
- 2018–Present: Troy

Head coaching record
- Overall: 445–137 (college)

Accomplishments and honors

Championships
- 6 Men SSAC (2011, 2012, 2013, 2014, 2015, 2016) 6 Women SSAC (2011, 2012, 2013, 2014, 2015, 2016) 4 National Championships (2011, 2012, 2013, 2015)

Awards
- Auburn University at Montgomery Hall of Fame Class of 2024 USPTA Southern College Coach of the Year (2022 Awards) USPTA College Coach of the Year (2015) USPTA Southern College Coach of the Year (2015 Awards); NAIA Coach of the Year (2011, 2012, 2013, 2015) ITA Women’s Southern Coach of the Year (2015) SSAC Men’s Coach of the Year (2011, 2012, 2013, 2014, 2015) SSAC Women’s Coach of the Year (2011, 2012, 2013, 2014) SSAC Women’s All Sports Coach of the Year (2013)

Rolando Vargas is the head tennis coach for the Troy Trojans men's tennis team. He was previously the head coach of the Radford Highlanders men's tennis team in 2018, as well as the head coach for the AUM Warhawks men's and women's tennis teams from 2010 to 2017. He holds the record for most wins in women’s tennis history at Auburn University at Montgomery, including four National Championships. Additionally, both of his men’s and women’s teams were undefeated for six consecutive years in every conference tournament in which they competed. He was inducted into the Hall of Fame on March 23, 2024.

Vargas is a graduate of Troy University and a former player for the Trojans. He played professionally after graduating from college, achieving a career-high ATP ranking of 839.

Rolando led Troy to a historic 2026 season. The Trojans reached their first Sunbelt Conference Championship match appearance since their 2015 title run. They finished with Sunbelt's best record and winning percentage, 24-5 (.828), making it back-to-back 20-plus win seasons as well as having a 17-match winning streak and 14-0 home record. The Trojans finished 8th in the ITA Southern Region for a 7th consecutive year, earning a ranking. Moreover, the duo of Yeray Andres Pastor and Luciano Alcocer was ranked throughout the year as high as 41st, finishing 77th in the last national rankings.

The 2025 season saw Rolando lead the Trojans back to the semifinals of the Sun Belt Championship after defeating No. 5 Louisiana 4–3 in the quarterfinals. He coached the Trojans to a 20–8, 4–3 SBC with nine sweeps becoming the only team in the Conference to reach the 20- win landmark. This is the fourth time in his tenure to have the most SBC wins (2024, 2023, 2021). It is his second 20-win season at Troy and marked the sixth time in his seven seasons with 16 or more wins (11 wins in his second year due to COVID’s cut short year). He also coached the Sun Belt Freshman of the Year in Hiiro Sakamoto.

Troy finished ranked 7 in the ITA Southern region, Vargas' career best, as well as finishing in these rankings for the sixth consecutive year (there were no regional rankings during the COVID year). The Trojans also received the Southern Region ITA Community Service Award.

In 2024, Vargas led Troy back into the nation rankings on several occasions during the spring of 2024, as the Trojans peaked at No. 62 and Mario Martinez Serrano was ranked No. 71 in singles at his high point during the year. The Trojans posted 19 wins, the third most during Vargas' tenure at Troy.

Their 19–7 record was the best in the Sun Belt, which happened in back-to-back years, and third in his career (2023, 2021). Troy finished ranked 9 in the ITA Southern region. The Trojans went on the road and defeated No. 53 South Florida. Another notable win was against South Alabama at home. Troy received an ITA Community Service Honorable mention. Additionally, he guided Martinez Serrano to a year-end 119 national ranking, a top 10 ITA southern ranking, and an ITA southern player to watch.

In 2023, he guided Troy to a conference-best record of 18–7. The Trojans finished for the third consecutive year in the Sunbelt Conference semifinals. Troy finished ranked in the top 10 in the ITA Southern region for the fourth time in a row in the year-end rankings. Under his tutelage, Mario Martinez Serrano earned Sunbelt and ITA Southern Freshman of the Year.

On May 13, 2022, he was named USPTA Southern College Coach of the Year.

In 2022, Vargas led Troy to its second straight appearance in the Sun Belt Conference Tournament semifinals, with 16 victories and a win over No. 48 Louisiana. In addition to the ranked win, the Trojans almost pulled off another stunner at No. 24 Florida State before losing to the Seminoles, 4–3, after a pair of three-set matches didn't go Troy's way. Troy finished ranked 9 in the Southern region, which is their third straight appearance in the year-end rankings.

In 2021, he led the Troy Trojans to a conference-high 20–4 record, finishing with an 8 ranking in the Southern region and as high as 60 nationally. Under his coaching, Carles Anton earned Sunbelt Freshman of the year honors.

Although the 2019–20 season was cut short due to the COVID-19 pandemic, Vargas' squad continued to show improvement. Under Vargas' leadership, the Trojans posted an 11–4 overall record and ended the season on a six-match winning streak. He also guided Oskar Michalek to 125 in the year-end national rankings.

In his first season in 2018–19, he guided his squad to 17 wins, the most since the program won 25 during the 2014–15 season. Troy also finished ranked 9 in the region.

Vargas spent one season as the head coach at Radford, where he led the Highlanders to a four-win improvement from the year prior.

While Vargas was head coach of both men's and women's teams at AUM in 2017, he led both programs to national and regional rankings. After playing their first full NCAA Division II schedule (thus ineligible for postseason during the transitionary period), the men finished the season ranked 7th in the highly competitive South Region and 13th in the nation. At the same time, the women were 5th and 19th, respectively. The men’s highlight win was when they visited Peach Belt regular season champions and nationally ranked No. 4 Armstrong State University in their last match of the season. The women also finished with a win over Clayton State University, with their highlight win over the University of North Georgia.

Previously, he took his teams to the NAIA National Tournament every season, finishing in fifth place or better every year with both programs. The highlight while coaching the men's team was leading them to the NAIA Finals. He was named USPTA Southern and National Coach of the Year in 2015. Likewise, Vargas was able to lead the women's team to four NAIA national championships (in bold) and finished with a career record of 150–35 (27–5, 26–2, 17–8, 19–8, 23–4, 21–4, and 17–4). Additionally, he led both of his teams to win the Southern States Athletic Conference Tournament six times in a row.

In 2013, his teams were ranked 1 in the nation throughout the season and finished 1 in singles and doubles with both men’s and women’s. In addition, several of his players (Nicolas Piñones-Haltenhoff, Ana Veselinovic, and Jade Curtis) finished on the ITA All-Star team (the best players in the nation in all divisions) in four different years, as the top-ranked player at the end of the year automatically earned the prestigious honor.

In 2011, he won his first national championship with only five players on the roster for the entire season. A notable victory for the men’s team included Barry University, which was defending the NCAA DII National Championship.

Additionally, he led his players to win the National Doubles Championships in the fall during his first month on the job. In the following years, he guided another women’s singles champion who also capitalized with a Super Bowl Championship, which included the champions in NCAA Division II, Division III, NJCAA, and NAIA. After accomplishing that honor, they received a Wild Card for the National NCAA DI Indoor Tournament in Flushing Meadows, NY. The opponents included Stanford, UCLA, and a win against Columbia University. He continued the success with another singles championship for the women’s and a doubles title for the men’s.

Vargas coached 58 NAIA All-Americans, 30 ITA All-Americans, 3 Marvin P. Richmond Outstanding Player of the NAIA National Tournament, and 10 Conference Player of the Year, and every year a member of his team received an ITA NAIA award such as Freshman of the Year (2011, 2012, 2015), Senior of the Year (2013, 2015), Player to Watch (2011), Arthur Ashe Jr. Leadership and Sportsmanship Award (2011, 2013, 2014), Most Improved Player of the Year (2015), and ITA Assistant Coach of the Year (2012, 2016).

The men’s team received the 2010–11 Buffalo Funds Champions of Character Team Award. The accolade, one of 23 given out by the National Association of Intercollegiate Athletics for each of its 23 championship sports, honors the one team in each sport that demonstrates in every day decisions respect, responsibility, integrity, servant leadership, and sportsmanship.

He is a certified USPTA Elite Professional and has been a member since 2009.

== Head men’s coaching record ==
Record table
Season	Team	Overall	Conference	Standing	Postseason
**Auburn-Montgomery Senators** (NAIA Southern States Athletic Conference) (2011–2016)
2011	Auburn-Montgomery	25–4	3–0	1st	NAIA Semifinals
2012	Auburn-Montgomery	17–8	3–0	1st	NAIA Quarterfinals
2013	Auburn-Montgomery	21–4	3–0	1st	NAIA Finals
2014	Auburn-Montgomery	24–4	10–0	1st	NAIA Semifinals
2015	Auburn-Montgomery	21–6	9–0	1st	NAIA Semifinals
2016	Auburn-Montgomery	19–5	8–1	1st	NAIA Quarterfinals
**Auburn-Montgomery Warhawks** (Division II Independent) (2017–2017)
2017	Auburn-Montgomery	13–6		13th Nation	
Auburn-Montgomery:		140–37 (.791)	36–1 (.973)		
**Radford Highlanders** (Big South Conference) (2018–2018)
2018	Radford	10–12	0–7	8th	
Radford:		10–12 (.455)	0–7 (.000)		
**Troy Trojans** (Sun Belt Conference) (2019–Present)
2019	Troy	17–8	1–6	7th	
Troy:		17–8 (.680)	1–6 (.143)		
2020	Troy	11–4	Covid 19		
Troy:		11–4 (.733)			
2021	Troy	20–4	3–2	2nd	Semifinals
Troy:		20–4 (.833)	3–2 (.600)		
2022	Troy	16–10	2–3	5th	Semifinals
Troy:		16–10 (.615)	2–3 (.400)		
2023	Troy	18–7	4–4	4th	Semifinals
Troy:		18–7(.720)	4–4 (.500)		
2024	Troy	19–7	4–4	4th	
Troy:		19–7(.731)	4–4 (.500)		
2025	Troy	20–8	4–3	4th	Semifinals
Troy:		20–8(.714)	4–3 (.571)		
2026	Troy	24–5	2–0	2nd	Finals
Troy:		24–5(.828)	2–0 (1.000)		
Total:		295–102 (.743)			
National champion Postseason invitational champion Conference regular season champion Conference regular season and conference tournament champion Division regular season champion Division regular season and conference tournament champion Conference tournament champion
