= Troy Trojans women's golf =

- University: Troy University
- Conference: SBC
- Head coach: Randy Keck (1st season)
- Location: Troy, Alabama, U.S.
- Course: Trojan Oaks Golf Complex; Par: 34
- Nickname: Trojans
- Colors: Cardinal, silver, and black

NCAA Championship appearances
- 2014, 2015, 2017

Conference champions
- 2014, 2015, 2017

Individual conference champions
- Fátima Fernández Cano (2014)

The Troy Trojans women's golf teams represent Troy University located in Troy, Alabama, and compete in National Collegiate Athletic Association (NCAA) Division I and the Sun Belt Conference. The Trojans play their home matches at the Troy Country Club, and use the recently built/renovated Trojan Oaks Golf Practice Facility for practicing.

== History ==
The Troy women's golf team has a relatively short history on the golf course. Yearly records for the women's golf team only date back to the 1993–94 academic year.

Since current head coach Bart Barnes took over the team in 2013, he has led the team to three NCAA Regional appearances, three conference championships, and multiple national rankings. One of Barnes's top record-breaking players at Troy, Fátima Fernández Cano, won the Sun Belt Conference individual championship in 2014. In 2016, despite the women's golf team falling short of another Sun Belt title, Fernández Cano received an individual at-large bid to the NCAA Golf Championships.

Barnes was named Sun Belt Conference Coach of the Year in 2014 and 2015.

== National Championships ==
- NCAA Division II – national champions: 1984, 1986, 1989

== Conference championships ==
- 2014 Sun Belt Conference
- 2015 Sun Belt Conference
- 2017 Sun Belt Conference

== All-Americans ==
The Troy women's golf team has had 4 players named All-Americans.

== Trojans on professional tours ==
- Fátima Fernández Cano (LPGA Tour)
- Sofia Bjorkman (LET Access Series)

== Trojan Oaks Golf Complex ==
The Trojans golf team's home practice course is the Trojan Oaks Practice Course, located in Troy, Alabama. The facility, which underwent a $1.5 million renovation in 2013, used 40 acres of the original Trojan Oaks Golf Course and created a 9-hole, par-34 practice course plus state-of-the-art putting and chipping greens, a wedge practice area, a full driving range, and a new golf clubhouse. The courses hitting bays feature FlightScope Technology for swing analysis, Sam PuttLab for putting analysis, and BodiTrak monitors to measure the body weight shifting when players swing. It is the only course of its kind on the Sun Belt Conference.
