= Troy Trojans women's volleyball =

American college volleyball team

- Founded: 1976
- University: Troy University
- Head coach: Josh Lauer (3rd season)
- Conference: Sun Belt; East Division
- Location: Troy, Alabama
- Home arena: Trojan Arena (capacity: 6,000)
- Nickname: Trojans
- Colors: Cardinal, silver, and black

Conference tournament champion
- 1983, 1989, 1990

Conference regular season champion
- 1989

The Troy Trojans women's volleyball team represents Troy University in the sport of volleyball. The Trojans compete in Division I of the National Collegiate Athletic Association (NCAA) and the Sun Belt Conference (SBC). The Trojans play their home matches in Trojan Arena on the university's Troy, Alabama campus, and are currently led by head coach Josh Lauer.

== History ==
The Troy Trojans women's volleyball was founded in 1975 under the direction of Troy State's women's athletic director, Joyce Sorrell, who was also named the head coach of the team. The team competed in the Alabama AIAW before moving to the NCAA's Division II in 1980.

In 1983, the team won its first conference championship, winning the Gulf South Conference Tournament title, and fishing the season with an overall record of 29–15. The volleyball team reached their greatest milestone when they again won the Gulf South Conference Tournament title in 1990, finishing with an overall record of 33–6, which is currently the most wins in a season that Troy volleyball has ever had.

During the 2021 season, Troy set a program record for the most wins over Power 5 teams in one season. Troy beat Alabama, LSU, and Virginia Tech that season, finishing with an 18–13 record with an appearance in the NIVC tournament. Troy would defeat Middle Tennessee in the first round, before falling to North Florida in the second round.

== Attendance ==
Below is a list of Troy's top single-game attendance figures.

Attendance	Year	Opponent
2,346	2019	South Alabama

== Conference championships ==
=== Regular season ===
- 1989 – Gulf South Conference Regular Season Champions
- 1996 – Mid-Continent Conference East Division Champions
- 1997 – Atlantic Sun West Division Champions

=== Tournament ===
- 1983 – Gulf South Conference Tournament Champions
- 1989 – Gulf South Conference Tournament Champions
- 1990 – Gulf South Conference Tournament Champions

== Postseason Results ==
=== NCAA tournament ===
The Troy women's volleyball team has never been to the NCAA tournament.

=== NIVC tournament ===
Year	Round	Opponent	Result/Score
2019	First round Second round	North Carolina A&T; Georgia Tech	W 3–0; L 1–3
2021	First round Second round	Middle Tennessee; North Florida	W 3–0; L 0–3
2022	First round	UT-Martin	

== Yearly Results ==
Statistics overview
Season	Coach	Overall	Conference	Standing	Postseason
Troy State (Gulf South Conference) (1983–1994)
1983	Ginger Lowe	29–15	9–4	3rd	
1985	Ginger Lowe	18–26		3rd	
1986	Ginger Lowe	20–24		4th	
1987	Ginger Lowe	23–17		3rd	
Ginger Lower:		0–0	0–0		
1989	Kim Van Deraa	27–14		1st	
1990	Kim Van Deraa	33–6	10–3	1st	
Kim Van Deraa:		60–20	0–0		
1991	Dee Dee Taylor	23–17		3rd	
1992	Dee Dee Taylor	0–0			
Dee Dee Taylor:		27–28	–		
1993	Melanie Davis	17–20		3rd	
1994	Melanie Davis	26–13	3–3		
1995	Melanie Davis	27–11	7–5		
Melanie Davis:		70–44	0–0		
1996	Ginger Lowe	18–14	5–1	1st (East)	
1997	Ginger Lowe	12–21	4–2	1st (West)	
1998	Ginger Lowe	15–19	3–2		
1999	Ginger Lowe	10–23	4–5		
2000	Ginger Lowe	20–11	4–5		
2001	Ginger Lowe	11–12	4–6		
2002	Ginger Lowe	20–11	7–4		
2003	Ginger Lowe	14–13	5–5		
Ginger Lowe:		120–124	0–0		
2004	Patrick Nicholas	9–18	4–6		
Patrick Nicholas:		9–18	4–6		
2005	Michael Izumi	10–15	3–10		
Michael Izumi:		10–15	3–10		
2006	Sonny Kirkpatrick	9–24	3–14		
2007	Sonny Kirkpatrick	16–17	7–10		
2008	Sonny Kirkpatrick	13–19	4–13		
2009	Sonny Kirkpatrick	12–18	7–10		
2010	Sonny Kirkpatrick	11–22	3–13		
2011	Sonny Kirkpatrick	16–15	6–10		
2012	Sonny Kirkpatrick	21–12	10–5		
2013	Sonny Kirkpatrick	13–21	7–11	8th	
2014	Sonny Kirkpatrick	10–22	2–18	11th	
2015	Sonny Kirkpatrick	14–18	7–9	T-6th	
2016	Sonny Kirkpatrick	10–23	4–12	5th (East)	
Sonny Kirkpatrick:		145–211	60–0		
2017	Josh Lauer	11–22	4–12	T-4th (East)	
2018	Josh Lauer	11–19	5–11	4th (East)	
2019	Josh Lauer	23–10	10–6	3rd (East)	NIVC Second Round
2020	Josh Lauer	11–9	10–6	2nd (East)	
2021	Josh Lauer	18–13	9–7	T-3rd (East)	NIVC Second Round
2022	Josh Lauer	18–12	11–5	T-2nd (West)	NIVC First Round
Josh Lauer:		64–64	30–34		
Total:		0–0			
National champion Postseason invitational champion Conference regular season champion Conference regular season and conference tournament champion Division regular season champion Division regular season and conference tournament champion Conference tournament champion
