= Nathalie Fradette =

Canadian softball player

Personal information
- Born: 26 October 1969 (age 55); Greenfield Park, Quebec, Canada

Sport
- Sport: Softball

Nathalie Fradette (born 26 October 1969) is a Canadian softball player chosen for the Canadian Softball team competing at the 2000 Summer Olympics.

== Life ==
Fradette was born in 1969 in the Greenfield Park area of the city of Longueuil in Quebec. She played softball for Columbus State University for three years and was a pitcher. During her career with the Columbus State Cougars of 69 games the team won 57 of them.

Fradette was chosen to compete in the women's Softball tournament at the 2000 Summer Olympics.
