= NCAA Division II men's golf championship =

NCAA Division II Men's Golf Championship

Tournament information
- Location: 2026: Boulder City, Nevada
- Established: 1963
- Course: 2026: Boulder Creek Golf Club
- Par: 2026: 72
- Length: 2026: 7,595 yards (6,945 m)
- Format: 54-hole stroke play, 8-team match play
- Month played: May

Current champion
- Team: Florida Southern; Individual: Octavio Laurent (USC Beaufort)

The NCAA Division II Men's Golf Championships, played in late May, is an annual competition in U.S. men's collegiate golf. From its inception through 2010, it was a 72-hole stroke play team competition, with an additional award for the lowest scoring individual competitor. The team format changed starting in 2011 to 54 holes of stroke play followed by an eight-team single elimination medal match play competition. The 54-hole individual leader is the individual champion.

Many of the individual champions have gone on to successful professional careers. The most successful individual winner is Lee Janzen (1986) who won eight times on the PGA Tour including two major championships, the 1993 and 1998 U.S. Opens.

== Results ==
=== Stroke play (1963–2010) ===
Year	Site (Host team)	Par	Team championship				Individual championship	
Year	Site (Host team)	Par	Champion	Score	Runner-up	Score	Champion	Score
1963	Springfield, MO (SW Missouri State)	72 (288)	Southwest Missouri State	1,188	Aquinas (MI)	1,199	Gary Head (Middle Tennessee State)	278 (−6)
1964	Springfield, MO (SW Missouri State)	72 † (216)	Southern Illinois	886	San Diego State	888	John Kurzynowski (Aquinas)	212 (−4)
1965	Springfield, MO (SW Missouri State)	72 (288)	Middle Tennessee State	1,157	Southern Illinois	1,202	Larry Gilbert (Middle Tennessee State)	280
1966	Chico, CA (Chico State)	72 (288)	Chico State	1,206	Lamar Tech	1,207	Bob Smith (Sacramento State)	279
1967	Murray, KY (Murray State)	71 (284)	Lamar Tech	1,141	Murray State	1,160	Larry Hinson (East Tennessee State)	276
1968	Beaumont, TX (Lamar Tech)	72 (288)	Lamar Tech	1,151	Middle Tennessee State	1,192	Mike Nugent (Lamar Tech)	280
1969	Albuquerque, NM (New Mexico)	72 (288)	San Fernando Valley State	1,231	Rollins	1,232	Corky Bassler (San Fernando Valley State); Mike Spang (Portland State)	297
1970	Youngstown, OH (Youngstown State)	71 (284)	Rollins	1,195	Georgia Southern	1,205	Gary McCord (UC Riverside)	285
1971	Chico, CA (Chico State)	72 (288)	LSU–New Orleans	1,198	San Fernando Valley State	1,202	Stan Stopa (LSU–New Orleans)	292
1972	Williamstown, MA (Williams)	72 (288)	LSU–New Orleans	1,214	South Florida	1,238	Jim Hilderbrand (Ashland)	300
1973	Riverside, CA (UC Riverside)	72 (288)	Cal State Northridge	1,180	South Florida	1,196	Paul Wise (Cal State Fullerton)	289
1974	Tampa, FL (South Florida)	72 (288)	Cal State Northridge	1,205	UC Irvine	1,211	Matt Bloom (UC Riverside)	294
1975	Martin, TN (UT–Martin)	72 ‡ (216)	UC Irvine	886	Cal State Northridge	891	Jerry Wisz (UC Irvine)	211
1976	Youngstown, OH (Youngstown State)	71 (284)	Troy State	1,181	UC Irvine	1,212	Mike Nicolette (Rollins)	286
1977	Houston, TX (Texas Southern)	71 (284)	Troy State	1,168	Rollins	1,179	David Thornally (Arkansas–Little Rock)	287
1978	Lakeland, FL (Florida Southern)	71 (284)	Columbus	1,174	Troy State	1,183	Thomas Brannen (Columbus)	282
1979	Davis, CA (UC Davis)	72 (288)	UC Davis	1,194	Columbus; Florida Southern	1,203	Tom Gleeton (Florida Southern)	289
1980	Thobidaux, LA (Nicholls State)	72 (288)	Columbus	1,178	Florida Southern	1,181	Paul Perini (Troy State)	288
1981	Hartford, CT (Hartford)	72 (288)	Florida Southern	1,184	United States International	1,219	Tom Patri (Florida Southern)	293
1982	Lakeland, FL (Florida Southern)	72 (288)	Florida Southern	1,181	Southwest Texas State	1,191	Vic Wilk (Cal State Northridge)	288
1983	California, PA (California)	72 (288)	Southwest Texas State	1,229	Troy State	1,234	Greg Chapman (Stephen F. Austin)	296
1984	Erie, PA (Gannon)	72 (288)	Troy State	1,198	Florida Southern	1,216	Greg Cate (Central Connecticut State)	295
1985	Huntsville, TX (Sam Houston State)	71 (284)	Florida Southern	1,192	Stephen F. Austin	1,202	Hugh Royer III (Columbus)	286
1986	Tampa, FL (Tampa)	72 (288)	Florida Southern	1,196	Columbus	1,207	Lee Janzen (Florida Southern)	281
1987	Columbus, GA (Columbus)	72 (288)	Tampa	1,175	Columbus	1,180	Jeff Leonard (Tampa)	280
1988	Kirksville, MO (NE Missouri State)	71 (284)	Tampa	1,189	Florida Southern	1,203	Jeff Leonard (Tampa)	287
1989	Erie, PA (Gannon)	72 (288)	Columbus	1,196	Valdosta State	1,206	Brian Dixon (Columbus)	294
1990	Boca Raton, FL (Florida Atlantic)	72 (288)	Florida Southern	1,170	Columbus	1,196	Bob Burns (Cal State Northridge)	288
1991	Boca Raton, FL (Florida Atlantic)	72 (288)	Florida Southern	1,166	Columbus	1,190	Clete Cole (Columbus)	287
1992	Spartanburg, SC (Wofford)	72 (288)	Columbus	1,144	Troy State	1,176	Diego Ventureira (Columbus)	285
1993	Turlock, CA (Cal State Stanislaus)	72 (288)	Abilene Christian	1,160	Columbus	1,165	Jeev Milkha Singh (Abilene Christian)	282
1994	Jacksonville, FL (North Florida)	72 (288)	Columbus	1,175	North Florida	1,179	Briny Baird (Valdosta State)	284
1995	Aiken, SC (USC–Aiken)	72 (288)	Florida Southern	1,204	South Carolina–Aiken	1,214	Briny Baird (Valdosta State)	290
1996	Edmond, OK (Central Oklahoma)	72 (288)	Florida Southern	1,178	South Carolina–Aiken	1,187	Dax Johnston (Central Oklahoma)	291
1997	Phoenix, AZ (Grand Canyon)	72 (288)	Columbus State	1,149	North Florida	1,153	Scott Householder (Cal State San Bernardino)	273
1998	Winter Park, FL (Rollins)	72 (288)	Florida Southern	1,168	Columbus State	1,175	Orjan Larsen (West Florida)	280
1999	Valdosta, GA (Valdosta State)	72 (288)	Florida Southern	1,125	South Carolina–Aiken	1,157	Matt Saglio (Florida Southern)	278
2000	Turlock, CA (Cal State Stanislaus)	72 (288)	Florida Southern	1,140	Cal State Bakersfield; Grand Canyon	1,169	Jeff Klauk (Florida Southern)	275
2001	Allendale, MI (Grand Valley State)	72 (288)	West Florida	1,148	Florida Southern	1,163	Steve Sokol (Florida Southern)	286
2002	Howey-in-the-Hills, FL (Rollins)	72 (288)	Rollins	1,194	Cal State Stanislaus	1,195	J. J. Jakovac (Chico State)	285
2003	Sunriver, OR	72 (288)	Francis Marion	1,149	Rollins	1,163	Andrew McArthur (Pfeiffer)	279
2004	DeLand, FL	72 (288)	South Carolina–Aiken	1,191	Chico State	1,200	J. J. Jakovac (Chico State)	287
2005	Savannah, GA (Armstrong State)	71 (284)	South Carolina–Aiken	1,158	Armstrong State	1,163	Dane Burkhart (South Carolina–Aiken)	279
2006	Athens, WV (Concord)	70 (280)	South Carolina–Aiken	1,148	Columbus State	1,160	Jamie Amoretti (St. Mary's–TX)	280
2007	Allendale, MI (Grand Valley State)	71 (284)	Barry	1,186	South Carolina–Upstate	1,187	Christian Ries (Columbus State)	286
2008	Houston, TX (Rice)	70 (280)	West Florida	1,129^{P}	North Alabama; St. Edward's (TX)	1,129	Jeff Goff (South Carolina–Aiken)	278^{P}
2009	Bellingham, WA (Western Washington)	71 (284)	Sonoma State	1,179^{P}	Cal State San Bernardino	1,179	Gavin Smith (Indiana–PA)	289^{P}
2010	Noblesville, IN	72 (288)	Florida Southern	1,206	Central Missouri	1,213	Cyril Bouniol (Abilene Christian)	285

=== Match play (2011–present) ===
Year	Site (Host team)	Par	Team championship			Individual championship	
Year	Site (Host team)	Par	Champion	Score	Runner-up	Champion	Score
2011	Athens, WV (Concord)	72 (216)	Cal State Monterey Bay	3–2	Lynn	Kyle Souza (Chico State)	212^{P} (−4)
2012	Louisville, KY (Bellarmine)	72 (216)	Nova Southeastern	5–0	Chico State	Joshua Creel (Central Oklahoma)	206^{P} (−10)
2013	Hershey, PA	71 (213)	Barry	2 1/2–2 1/2^{P}	Lynn	Tim Crouch (Florida Southern)	211^{P} (−2)
2014	Allendale, MI (Grand Valley State)	71 (213)	Barry	3 1/2–1 1/2	Nova Southeastern	Tim Crouch (Florida Southern)	213 (E)
2015	Conover, NC	71 (213)	Nova Southeastern	3–2	Lynn	Sam Migdal (Central Missouri)	205 (−8)
2016	Denver, CO (Metro State)	72 (216)	Saint Leo	3–2	Chico State	Hugo Bernard (Saint Leo)	203 (−13)
2017	Kissimmee, FL	70 (210)	Florida Southern	3–2	Lynn	Chandler Blanchet (West Florida)	209 (−1)
2018	Muscle Shoals, AL (North Alabama)	72 (216)	Lynn	3–2	West Florida	John VanDerLaan (Florida Southern)	199 (−17)
2019	Daniels, WV	72 (216)	Lynn	3–2	Lincoln Memorial	Michael VanDerLaan (Florida Southern)	207 (−9)
2020	Cancelled due to the COVID-19 pandemic						
2021	Palm Beach Gardens, FL	72 (216)	Arkansas Tech	3–2	Georgia Southwestern	Keegan Bronnenberg (Indianapolis)	220 (+4)
2022	Dearborn, MI	72 (216)	Lee	4–1	Oklahoma Christian	Joel Sylven (UMSL)	220 (+4)
2023	Warren, OH	72 (216)	Nova Southeastern	3–2	Oklahoma Christian	Andrew Riley (Palm Beach Atlantic)	204 (−12)
2024	Winter Garden, FL	71 (213)	Colorado Christian	3–2	North Georgia	Wyatt Provence (West Texas A&M)	201 (−12)
2025	Palm Beach Gardens, FL	72 (216)	West Florida	2 1/2–2 1/2^{P}	Colorado Christian	Hunter Smith (North Georgia)	210 (–6)
2026	Boulder City, NV	72 (216)	Florida Southern	3–2	Wingate	Octavio Laurent (USC Beaufort)	199 (–17)
2027	Palm Beach Gardens, FL						

^{P} = Won in a playoff
† = 54-hole tournament, scheduled
‡ = 54-hole tournament, due to weather

== Multiple winners ==
=== Team ===
The following schools have won more than one team championship:

- 14: Florida Southern
- 6: Columbus State
- 3: Cal State Northridge, Troy State, USC Aiken, Nova Southeastern, West Florida
- 2: Lamar State, LSU-New Orleans, Rollins, Tampa, Barry, Lynn

=== Individual ===
The following men have won more than one individual championship:

- 2: Briny Baird, Tim Crouch, J. J. Jakovac, Jeff Leonard

=== Individual champion's school ===
The following schools have produced more than one individual champion:

- 9: Florida Southern
- 6: Columbus State
- 3: Cal State Northridge, Cal State Chico
- 2: Middle Tennessee State, Tampa, UC Riverside, Valdosta State, South Carolina-Aiken, Abilene Christian, Central Oklahoma, West Florida

== See also ==
- NAIA Men's Golf Championship
