= Troy Trojans men's golf =

- University: Troy University
- Conference: Sun Belt Conference
- Head coach: Bart Barnes (5th season)
- Location: Troy, Alabama
- Course: Troy Golf Practice Facility
- Nickname: Trojans
- Colors: Cardinal, silver, and black

NCAA Championship appearances
- 2025

NCAA regional appearances
- 1995, 2015, 2016, 2017, 2025

Conference champions
- 1975, 1976, 1980, 1981, 1982, 1983, 1984, 1985, 1986, 1987, 1988, 1990, 1994, 1995, 1996, 1997, 2016

Individual conference champions
- Josh Broadaway (1999, 2000); Brian Tolomeo (1997); Scott Stephens (1996); Kevin Blanton (1995); Mike Griffin (1968, 1969)

The Troy Trojans men's golf teams represent Troy University located in Troy, Alabama, and compete in National Collegiate Athletic Association (NCAA) Division I and the Sun Belt Conference. The Trojans play their home matches at the Troy Country Club, and use the newly built/renovated Trojan Oaks Golf Practice Facility for practicing.

== History ==
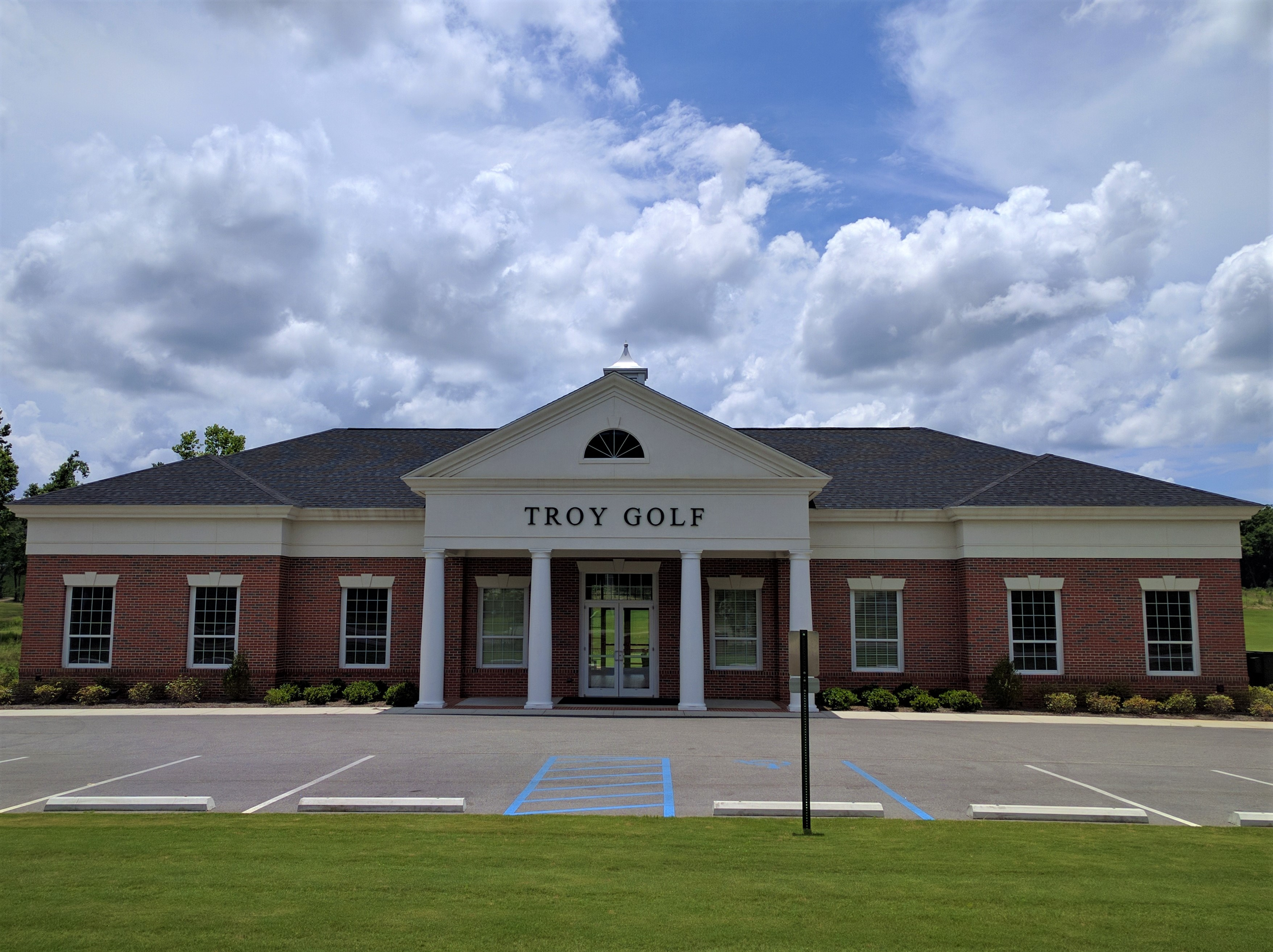
The Troy Golf Clubhouse

The Troy men's golf team began playing golf 1951, competing primarily in the Alabama Collegiate Conference. In 1968 and 1969, then player and future head coach Mike Griffin who was the #1 seed player for Troy State, won the Alabama Collegiate Conference individual championship two years in a row.

Under head coach Mike Griffin, the Trojan men were one of the most dominant golf teams in the NCAA, winning two Division II national championships and also finishing as a runner-up. In total, the Trojan men have won three NCAA Division II Men's Golf Championships in 1976, 1977, and 1984. They also finished as national runner-up in 1978, 1983, and 1992. From 1975 to 1993, the Trojan men's golf team made an unprecedented 19-straight appearances in the NCAA Division II Golf Championships. During Griffin's coaching tenure, player Paul Perini went on to win the NCAA Division II Individual Championship in 1980.

Griffin was inducted into the Golf Coaches Association of America Hall of Fame in 2000 for his accomplishments.

In 2002, Matt Terry took over the head coaching position at Troy. He has helped lead Troy from their transition from Division II to Division I, and has had remarkable success doing so, winning eight conference championships since the team joined Division I. Terry has also led Troy to multiple national rankings, and five NCAA Regional appearances.

In 2017, player Cam Norman qualified to receive an individual at-large bid to the NCAA Golf Championship held at Rich Harvest Farms. He finished tied for 23rd place, which is the highest a Trojan player has ever finished in individual competition at the NCAA Golf Championship since Troy joined Division I in 1994.

== National Championships ==
- NCAA Division II – national champions: 1976, 1977, 1984
- NCAA Division II – national runner-up: 1978, 1983, 1992
- NCAA Division II – individual national champions: 1980: Paul Perini

== Conference championships ==
=== Division II ===
- 1975 Gulf South Conference
- 1976 Gulf South Conference
- 1980 Gulf South Conference
- 1981 Gulf South Conference
- 1982 Gulf South Conference
- 1983 Gulf South Conference
- 1984 Gulf South Conference
- 1985 Gulf South Conference
- 1986 Gulf South Conference
- 1987 Gulf South Conference
- 1988 Gulf South Conference
- 1990 Gulf South Conference

=== Division I ===
- 1994 East Coast Conference
- 1995 Mid-Continent Conference
- 1996 Mid-Continent Conference
- 1997 Mid-Continent Conference
- 2016 Sun Belt Conference

== NCAA appearances ==
=== Team results ===
Year	Regional	Finish	Total	To par
1995	-	-	-	-
2015	New Haven, Connecticut	10th	856	+16
2016	Franklin, Tennessee	11th	876	+12
2017	College Grove, Tennessee	6th	877	+13

=== Individual results ===
Year	Player	Regional/ Championships	Finish
2008	Michael McGrady	Chattanooga, Tennessee Regional	105th
2014	Jared Bettcher	Auburn, Alabama Regional	71st
2015	Tolver Dozier	NCAA Championships	155th
2017	Cam Norman	NCAA Championships	23rd
2023	Brantley Scott	Auburn, Alabama Regional	59th

== NGI appearances ==
=== Team results ===
Year	Location	Finish	Total	To par
2023	Maricopa, Arizona	10th	-	-

== Award winners ==
- Elite 89 Award

Tolver Dozier – 2015

== All-Americans ==
The Troy men's golf team has had 38 players named All-Americans, with 10 of them being named 1st Team All-American.

== Trojans on professional tours ==
- Ben Bates
- Josh Broadaway
- Ricky Beck
- Tolver Dozier
- Zach Portemont
- Jake Tucker
- Cam Norman

== Trojan Oaks Golf Complex ==
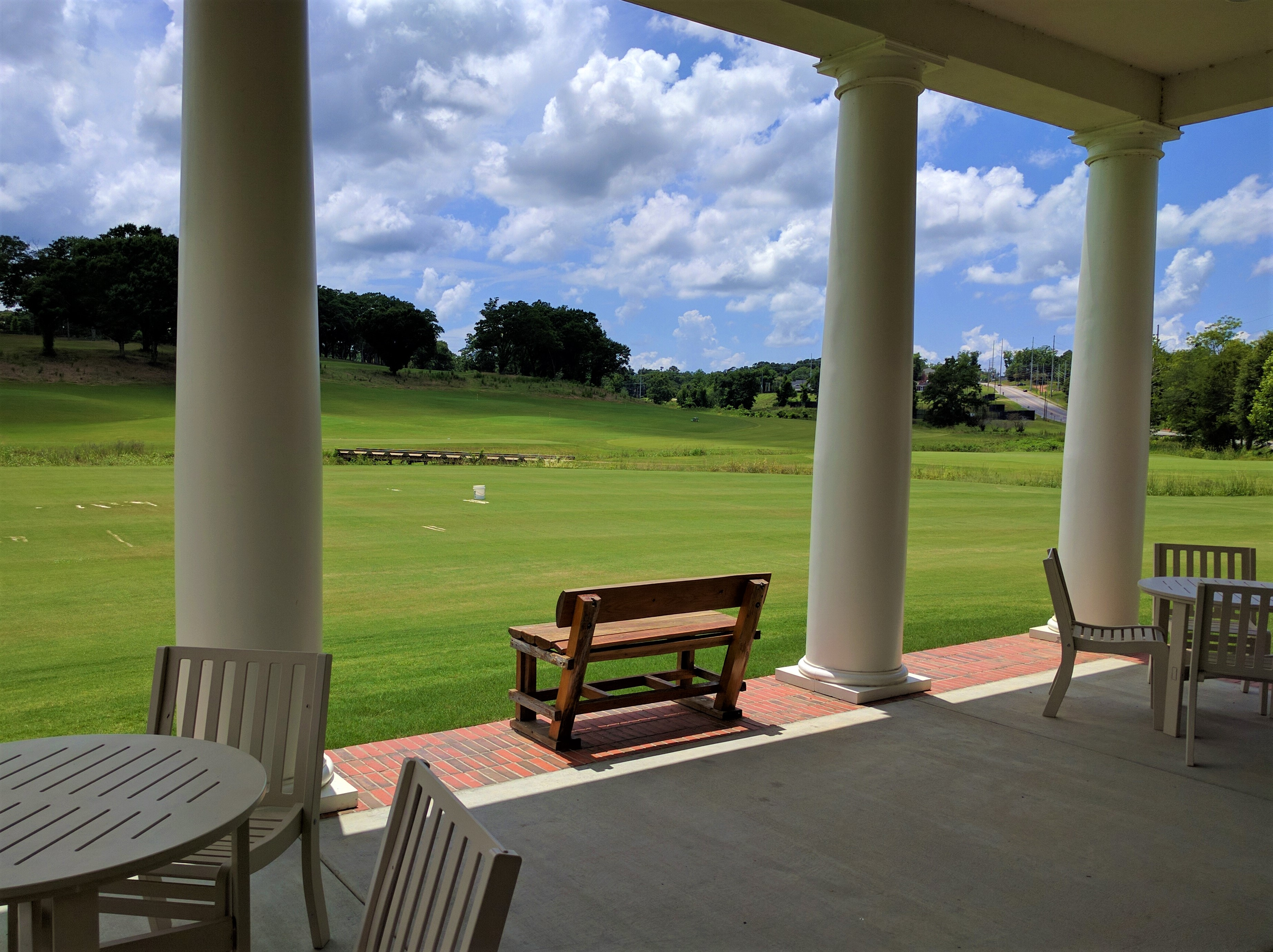
The Troy Golf Clubhouse rear lounge area, facing the golf course

The Trojans golf team's home practice course is the Trojan Oaks Practice Course, located in Troy, Alabama. The facility, which underwent a $1.5 million renovation in 2013, uses 35 acres of the original Trojan Oaks Golf Course and created a 9-hole, par-34 practice course plus state-of-the-art putting and chipping greens, a wedge practice area, a full driving range, and a new golf clubhouse.

The 4,400-square foot Troy Golf Clubhouse features men's and women's locker rooms, coaches' locker room, three coaches offices, team lounge area, two indoor hitting bays, and a large indoor bay for full shots and putting.

Each of the clubhouse's hitting bays feature FlightScope Technology for swing analysis, Sam PuttLab for putting analysis, and BodiTrak monitors to measure the body weight shifting when players swing. The practice facility features six mini verde greens that can be played from multiple tees, in addition to three practice tees – two for short game and one for longer shots. It is the only course of its kind on the Sun Belt Conference.
