= Colley Track/Soccer Complex =

Sports complex in Troy, Alabama, US

Coordinates: 31.8023°N 85.9537°W

Colley Soccer Complex
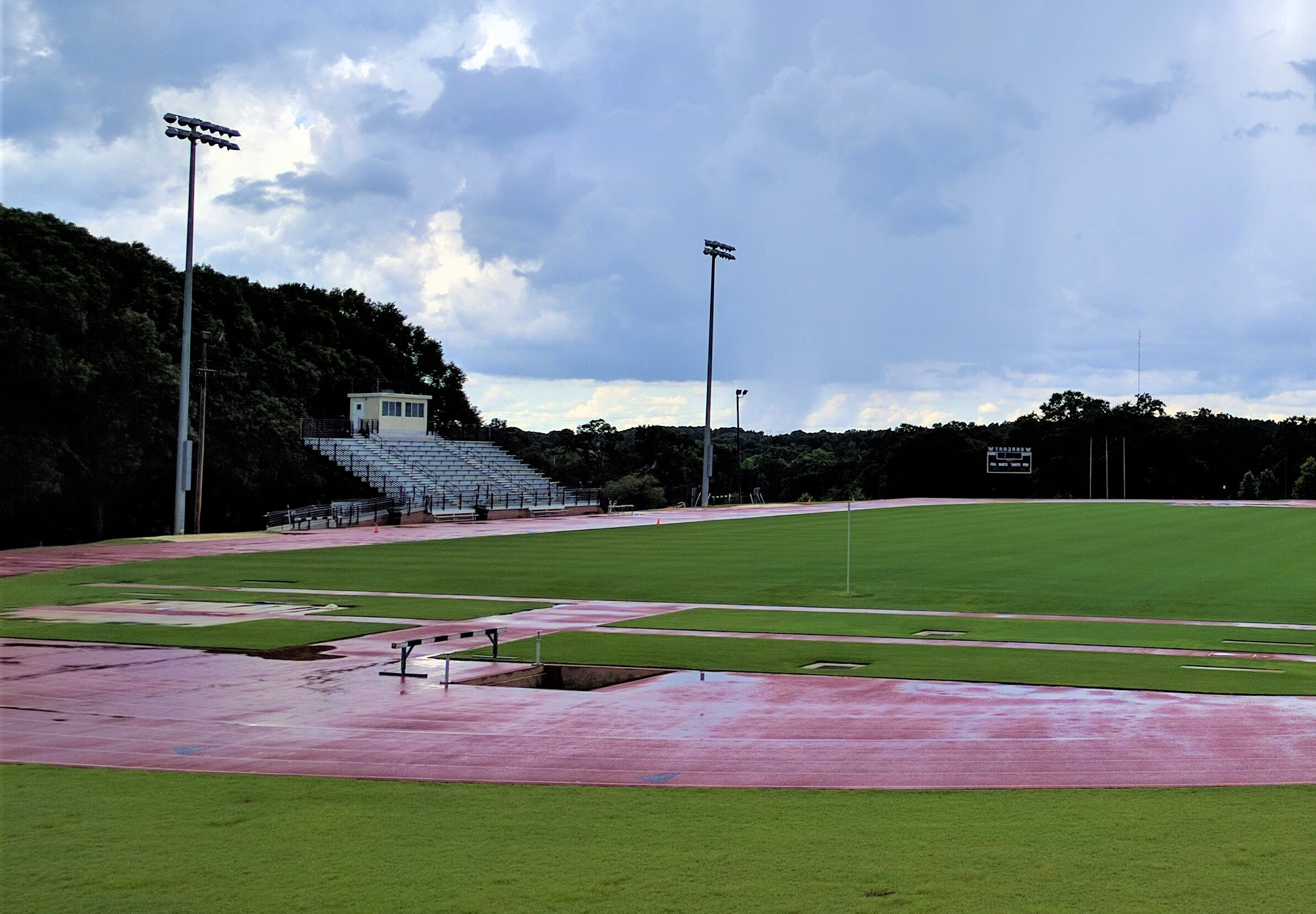
- View of the field and stands in 2017
- Interactive map of Colley Soccer Complex
- Full name: Jesse H. Colley Track/Soccer Complex
- Address: Luther Drive; Troy, Alabama; United States
- Owner: Troy University
- Operator: Troy University Athletics
- Capacity: 500
- Type: Stadium
- Surface: Bermuda grass
- Scoreboard: Daktronics LED
- Record attendance: 1,365 (Troy vs. South Alabama, 25 Sep 2015)
- Current use: Soccer; Track and field

Construction
- Opened: 2003; 23 years ago
- Renovated: 2005
- Expanded: 2008
- Cost: $1 million

Tenants
- Troy Trojans (NCAA) teams: women's soccer (2003-present); track & field (2003-present)

Website
- troytrojans.com/TrackSoccerComplex

The Jesse H. Colley Track/Soccer Complex is a stadium in Troy, Alabama, owned and operated by the Troy University. Opened in 2003, the complex includes a full-size soccer field, an eight-lane Athletic Polymer Systems Tartan surface on the 400-meter track, four long jump/triple jump pits, men's and women's pole vault facilities and high jump pits, an inside steeplechase water jump, a triple-ring throwing area for the discus, shot put and hammer throw, and an Olympic-caliber cage around the discus and hemmer throw facilities.

The facility serves as home of Troy Trojans women's soccer and track and field teams. It is also capable of hosting sprints in either direction and has a dual javelin approach.

The addition of the facility has enabled Troy University to host several events that range from the Coach "O" Invitational, the Special Olympics, the Alabama High School Athletic Association (AHSAA) State Championships, and the US Junior National State Championships.

The Jesse H. Colley Track/Soccer Complex, which surrounds Troy's NCAA regulation soccer field, cost approximately $1 million to build.

The facility was renovated in 2005 to feature a press box that is used for both soccer and track events. The press box is located above a grand stand that seats 500 people. The soccer pitch consists of Bermuda grass and measures 115 yards by 75 yards with FIFA World Cup style goals. Also added in 2006 were soccer offices and locker rooms, to go along with concession stands and restrooms. The soccer locker room features a team lounge, that includes a state-of-the-art video and sound system.

The improvements of 2006 follow the original construction of the facility in 2003. Added for 2008 were Kwik-Goal Referee Shelters and Team Shelters for both teams.

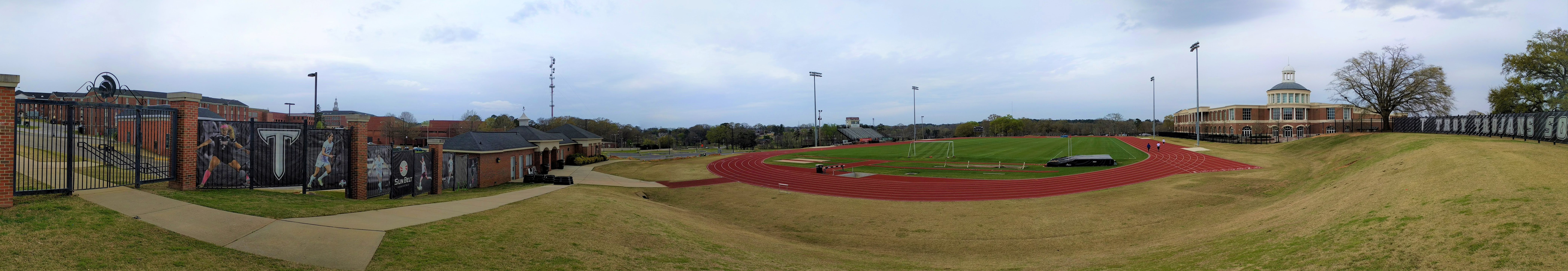
Panorama of the complex as seen in 2018
