= Troy Trojans women's tennis =

American tennis tournament

- University: Troy University
- Athletic director: Brent Jones
- Head coach: Rawia Elsisi (5th season)
- Conference: SBC
- Location: Troy, AL
- Home Court: Jimmy Lunsford Tennis Complex
- Nickname: Trojans
- Colors: Cardinal, silver, and black

NCAA Tournament appearances
- 2004

Conference Tournament championships
- 1995, 2004

The Troy Trojans women's tennis team represents Troy University and plays in the Sun Belt Conference. All home matches are played at the 12-court Jimmy Lunsford Tennis Complex on Troy's campus.

== History ==
The women's tennis team began playing in the 1980s, and because of a lack of record keeping during that time, the exact year it was founded is unknown, as well as the yearly records.

In 1995, the Trojan women won their first conference tournament title while a member of the Mid-Continent Conference. That same year, player Claire Mowling was named the Mid-Con Newcomer of the Year.

After becoming a member of the Atlantic Sun Conference in the late 1990s, the women again went on to win another conference in 2004 under head coach Eric Hayes. That year, the women made it to the finals of the Atlantic Sun Tournament, defeating UCF by a score of 4–2. They would receive the automatic bid to play in their first ever NCAA Tournament, matching up with #5 Clemson. The Trojans would be defeated by the Tigers, 4–0.

The Trojans program moved from the Atlantic Sun Conference to the Sun Belt Conference for the 2005 season. In 2006, just Troy's second season of being in the Sun Belt Conference, the women's team won the consolation bracket of the Sun Belt Tournament and finished the season with a 16–5 record and a #68 national ranking, their highest final ranking of Eric Hayes tenure as head coach. The doubles duo of Tsitsi Masviba and Claudia Strauss finished their 2006 campaign as the #55 doubles team in the country, going 13–6 during the 2006 season. The Lady Trojans followed that up in 2007 with another winning season, going 13–9 with a national ranking of #72.

Hayes would lead the program to more successful seasons afterwards, accumulating a record of 74–56 between 2008 and 2013 and only having one season with a losing record in that span. In 2013, Hayes' last season as head coach, he coached the women's team to a 17–6 record, putting together a 12-game win streak that was the third-longest win streak in the country during the 2013 season. Troy entered the Sun Belt Tournament as the #3-seed, but was upset by #6-seed Middle Tennessee in the quarterfinals.

Rawia Elsisi, a former Troy women's tennis player, was hired in 2014 as the next head coach for the team. In her first season at the helm, she led the Trojans to a 15–8 record that included a win over then #72-ranked Nicholls State and received the #4-seed in the Sun Belt Tournament. Troy defeated Texas State in the quarterfinals of tournament, only to drop their semifinal match to #66 Georgia State.

In 2018, Troy garnered their first ever #1-seed into the Sun Belt Tournament by way of a 4–2 conference record during the season, despite finishing the regular season with an 8–10 record. Troy had gone a 6-game win streak toward the end of the season, which included a 4–3 win over eventual Sun Belt champion Georgia State. The Trojans won their first round match of the Sun Belt Tournament against #9-seed Georgia Southern but lost their semifinal match to #4-seed South Alabama.

== Award Winners/Finalists ==
- NCAA Woman of the Year Award Finalist

Rawia Elsisi – 2009

- Atlantic Sun Conference Coach of the Year

Eric Hayes – 2004

- Sun Belt Conference Coach of the Year

Rawia Elsisi – 2018

== ITA Final Rankings ==
Year	Record	ITA National Ranking	ITA Regional Ranking
2002	–	#73	–
2006	16–5	#68	–
2007	13–9	#72	#9
2008	10–10	–	#14
2009	13–7	–	#14
2010	11–9	–	#10
2013	17–6	–	#7
2016	12–9		#8

- The doubles duo of Tsitsi Masviba and Claudia Strauss finished the 2006 season as the #55 doubles team in the country, going 13–6 on the season.

== Year-by-Year Results ==
Season	Overall record	Conference record	Postseason	Final nat'l rank	Notes
1995	0–0	0–0			Mid-Continent Conference Champions
2002	17–4	5–1		#73	Atlantic Sun Conference Runner-Up
2004	14–8	4–2	NCAA First Round		Atlantic Sun Conference Champions
2006	16–5	3–2		#68	Sun Belt Conference Consolation Winner
2007	13–9	3–2		#72	
2008	10–10	3–2			
2009	13–7	4–2			
2010	11–9	6–2			
2011	12–14	3–3			
2012	11–10	2–2			
2013	17–6	5–1			
2014	15–8	3–1			
2015	10–9	2–4			
2016	12–9	2–3			
2017	8–15	2–2			
2018	9–10	4–2			
2019	10–11	4–5			
2020	5–4	0–0			Season cancelled due to COVID-19
TOTALS	203–148	55–36			

== Postseason Results ==
Year	Round	Opponent	Result/Score
2004	First Round	Clemson	L 0–4
