= Jimmy Lunsford Tennis Complex =

Tennis facility in Troy, Alabama

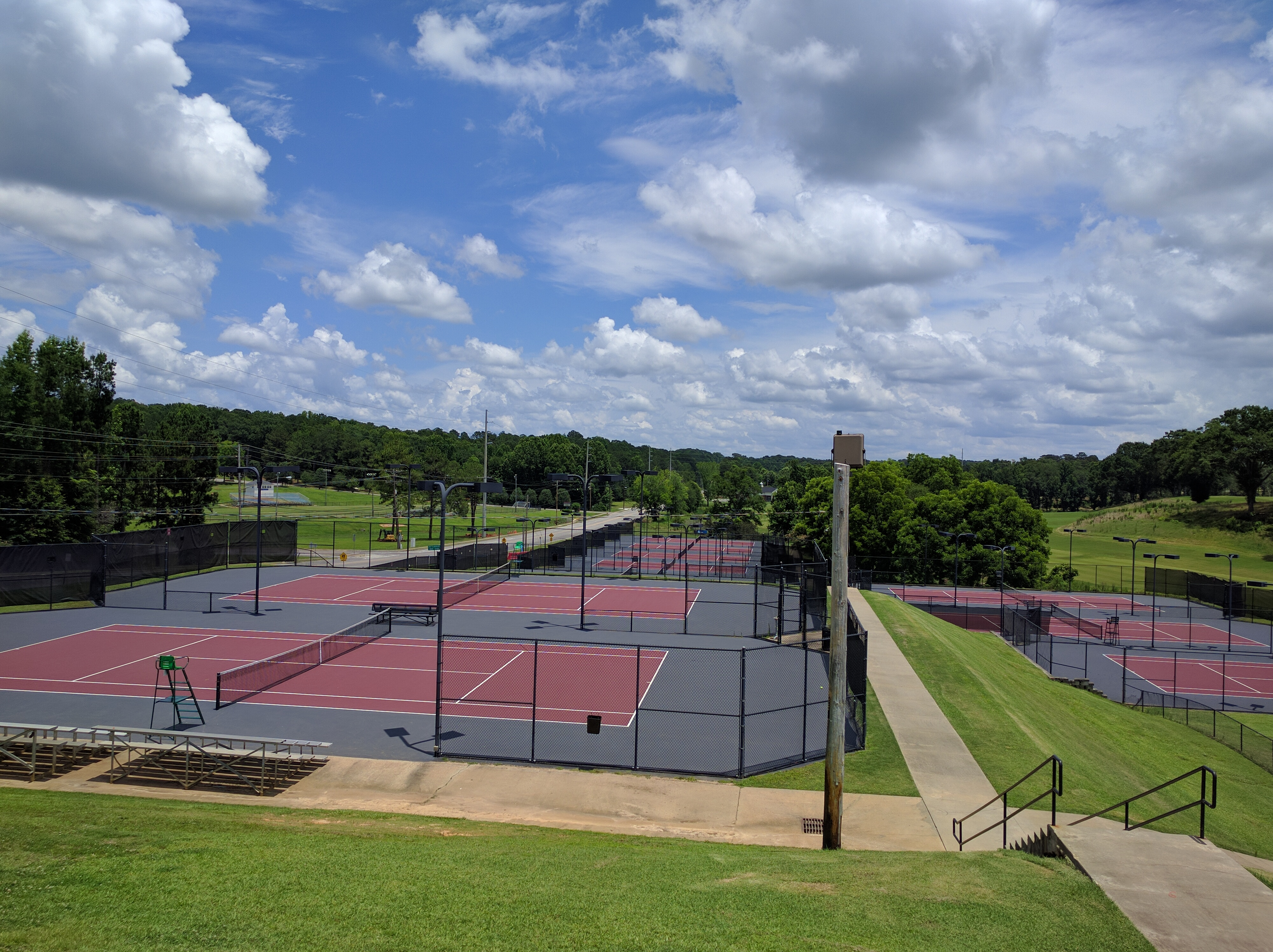
- Interactive map of Jimmy Lunsford Tennis Complex
- Former names: Trojan Oaks Tennis Complex
- Location: Troy, Alabama, USA
- Coordinates: 31°48′25″N 85°57′15″W
- Owner: Troy University; City of Troy; Troy City Schools
- Capacity: 150
- Surface: Hard, Outdoors

Construction
- Groundbreaking: 2000
- Opened: 2001
- Cost: $700,000

Tenants
- Troy Trojans men's tennis Troy Trojans women's tennis Charles Henderson Trojans tennis USTA Tennis Classic of Troy (Professional)

The Jimmy Lunsford Tennis Complex is a tennis facility located on the campus of Troy University in Troy, Alabama. The complex opened in the spring of 2001 as the Trojan Oaks Tennis Complex. It was renamed the Jimmy C. Lunsford Tennis Complex a few years later in honor of the City of Troy's mayor by the same name who played a key role in getting the facility built. It is a first-class, full-service facility, offering 12 lighted hard courts with a clubhouse and pro shop.

The facility is one of the largest on-campus tennis facilities in the Sun Belt Conference.

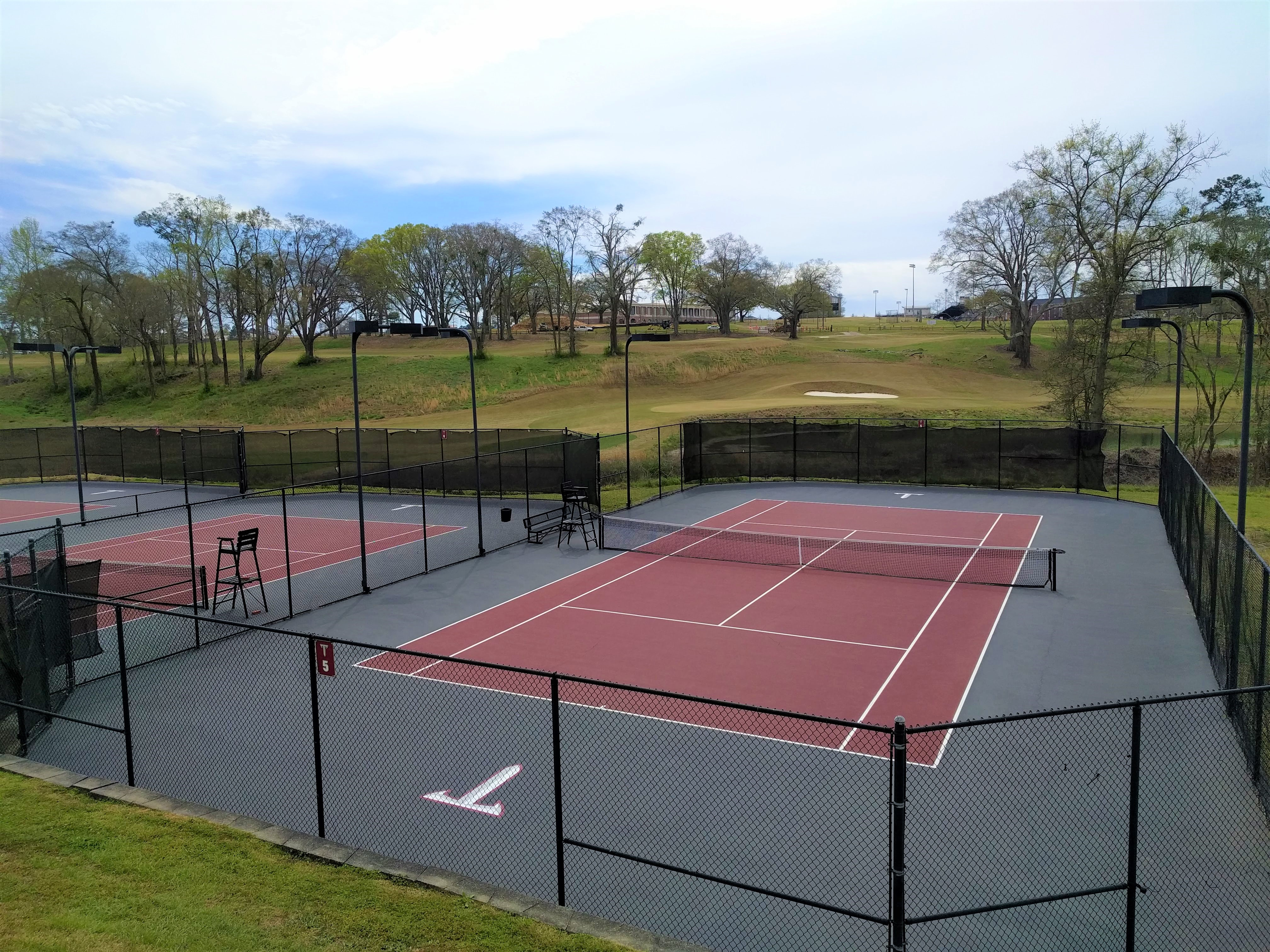

Tennis lessons, clinics, and tournaments are all offered at the venue. The facility is owned equally between the City of Troy, Troy University and the Troy City School System.

The courts play host to the Troy University tennis teams and the Charles Henderson High School tennis teams. The courts have also played host to the USTA Tennis Classic of Troy, a $25,000 professional ITF Women's Circuit tournament. Well-known players in the WTA to have participated in the tournaments are Varvara Lepchenko, Melanie Oudin, Shenay Perry, Bethanie Mattek-Sands, Angela Haynes, and Ahsha Rolle. The tennis complex has also hosted the Sun Belt Shootout over recent years.

== Gallery ==
Jimmy Lunsford Tennis Complex
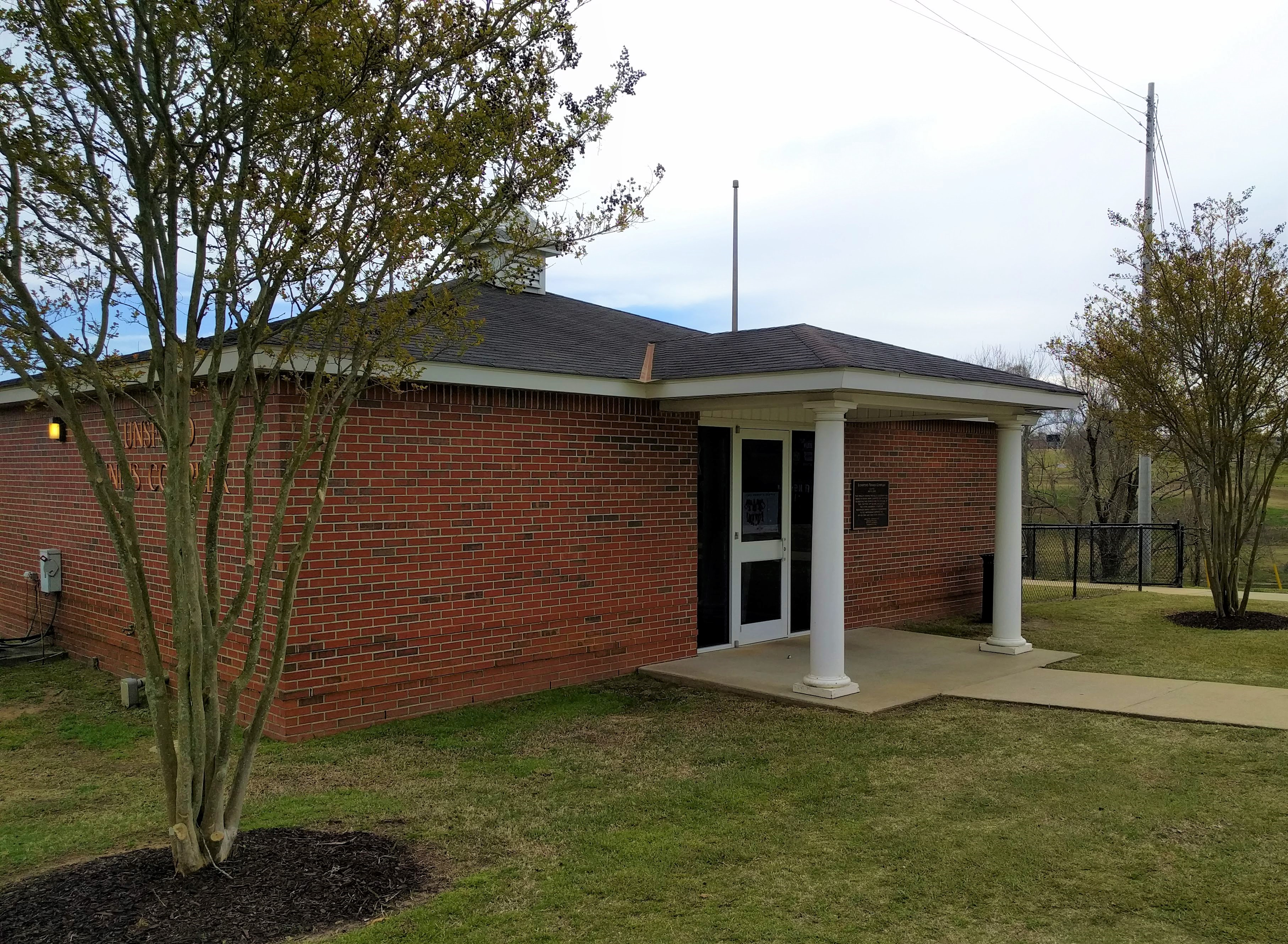

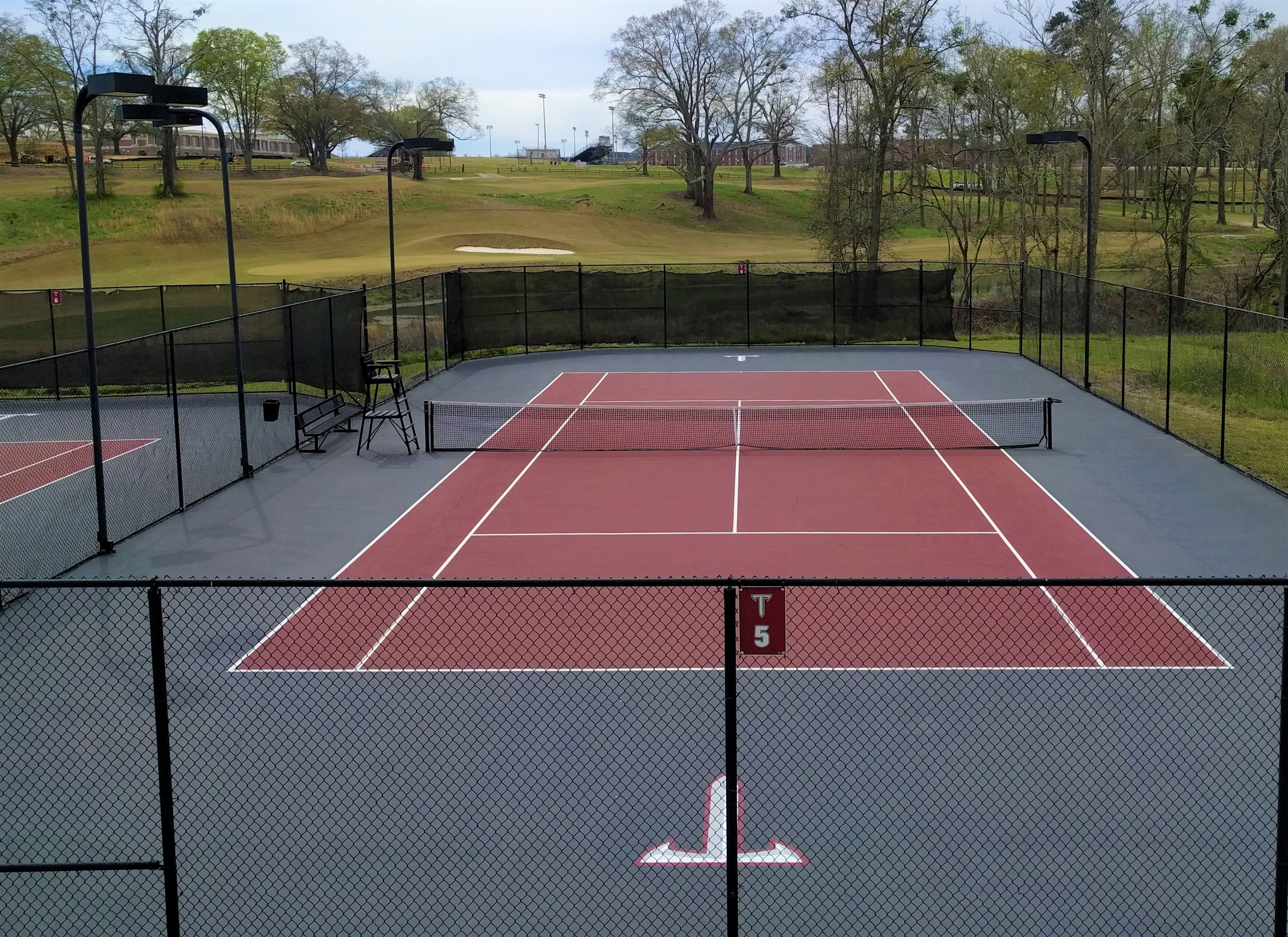
