= Racquet Sports Professionals Association =

Professional membership organization of tennis instructors

- Sport: Tennis
- Also governs: Pickleball, Padel, Squash, Platform Tennis
- Abbreviation: RSPA
- Founded: 1927
- Location: Lake Nona, Florida, U.S.
- President: Trish Faulkner
- CEO: Brian Dillman

Official website
- rspa.net
- (United States)

The Racquet Sports Professionals Association (RSPA) is an organization that offers certification and professional development for professional racquet sports teachers and coaches. Certification is available in tennis, pickleball, squash, padel and platform tennis.

The organization has approximately 15,000 members in the United States and promotes the racquet sports industry.

The organization's magazine, RSPA ADDvantage, offers news and professional development materials for coaches and teaching professionals.

== History ==
In February 1927, Vincent Richards proposed the idea of a professional association for professional players. Later that year it was founded as the Professional Lawn Tennis Association (PLTA) of the United States in November 1927. It later became responsible for the administration of the U.S. Pro Tennis Championships and also officially sanctioned professional tournaments, as well as the pro tennis circuit before the open era.

In 1957, the name was changed again to the United States Professional Lawn Tennis Association (USPLTA). In 1969, following the Open era when most players turned professional, it moved into training players to be certified instructors. By 1970, the association's name changed to United States Professional Tennis Association (USPTA).

During September 2024, the association rebranded to become the Racquet Sports Professionals Association (RSPA) and broadened its scope to include all racquet sports.

== Divisions of the RSPA ==
- Eastern
- Florida
- Hawaii
- Intermountain
- Mid-Atlantic
- Middle States
- Midwest
- Missouri Valley
- New England
- Northern
- Northern California
- Pacific Northwest
- San Diego
- Southern
- Southern California
- Southwest
- Texas

== See also ==
- United States Tennis Association
- American Tennis Association

== Official website ==
- Official website
