= Trojan Oaks Golf Course =

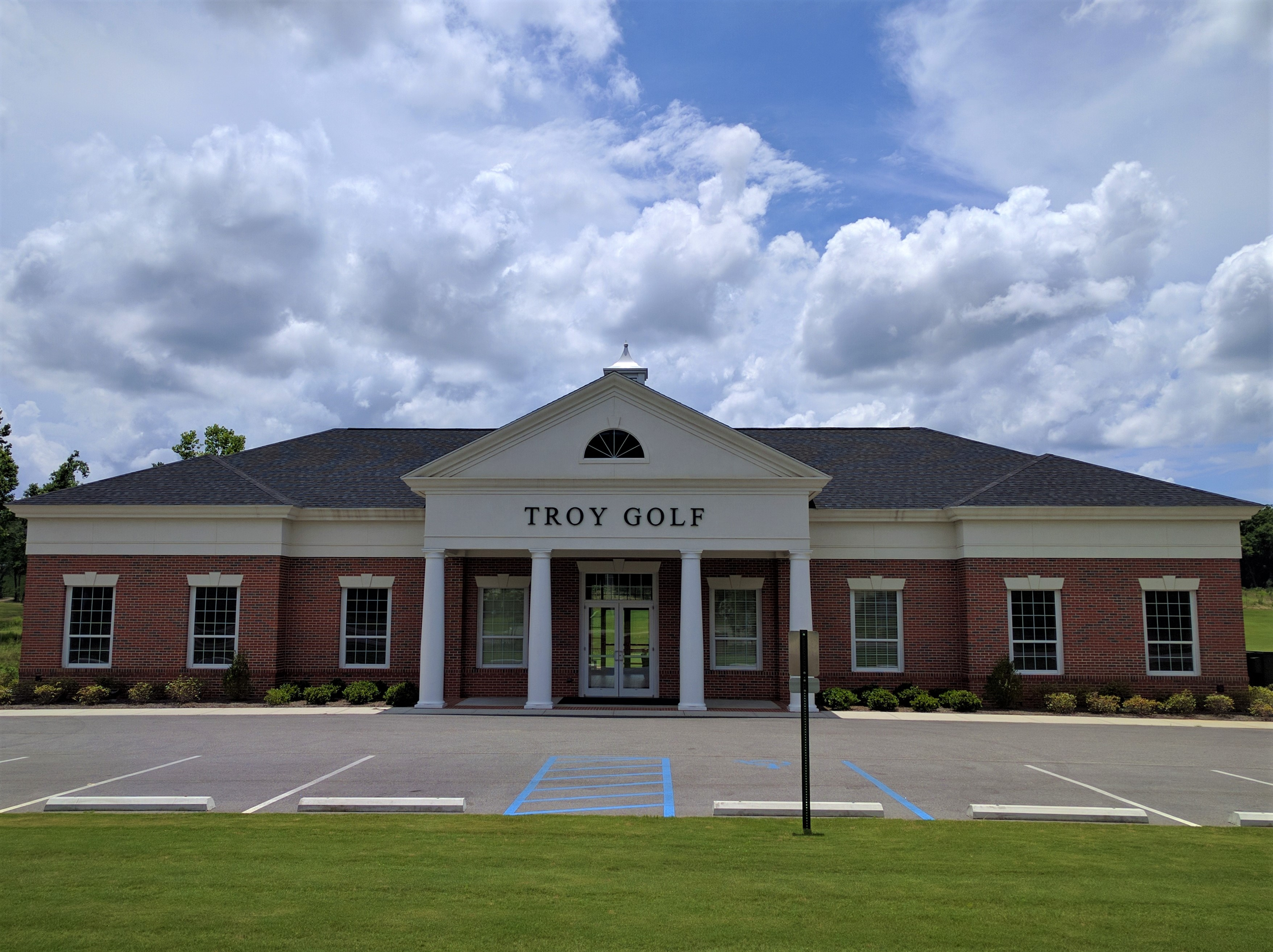
- Interactive map of Trojan Oaks Golf Course
- 31°48′16″N 85°57′8″W

Club information
- Location: Troy, Alabama; United States
- Established: 1977
- Type: Private
- Owner: Troy University
- Tota holes: 9
- Tournaments: None

Trojan Oaks
- Par: 36
- Length: 3,211 yards (2,936 m)
- Course rating: 35.5

Trojan Oaks Golf Course was a 9-hole championship golf course on the campus of Troy University. It was for use by the general public, golf team, and students. The Trojan Oaks was 3,211 yards (2,936 m) from the longest tee. The par for the course was 36 with a course rating of 35.5 and a slope rating of 125. The greens and fairways were both Bermuda grass. The course was built over the course of two years and opened in 1977 under the supervision of Chancellor Ralph Wyatt Adams. The course was closed in March 2010 in order to build a new basketball arena on the grounds.

The course does not attract a great deal of extra-county players, other than faculty and students of the university. This is in part due to the presence of a course on the world-renowned Robert Trent Jones Golf Trail in nearby Montgomery.

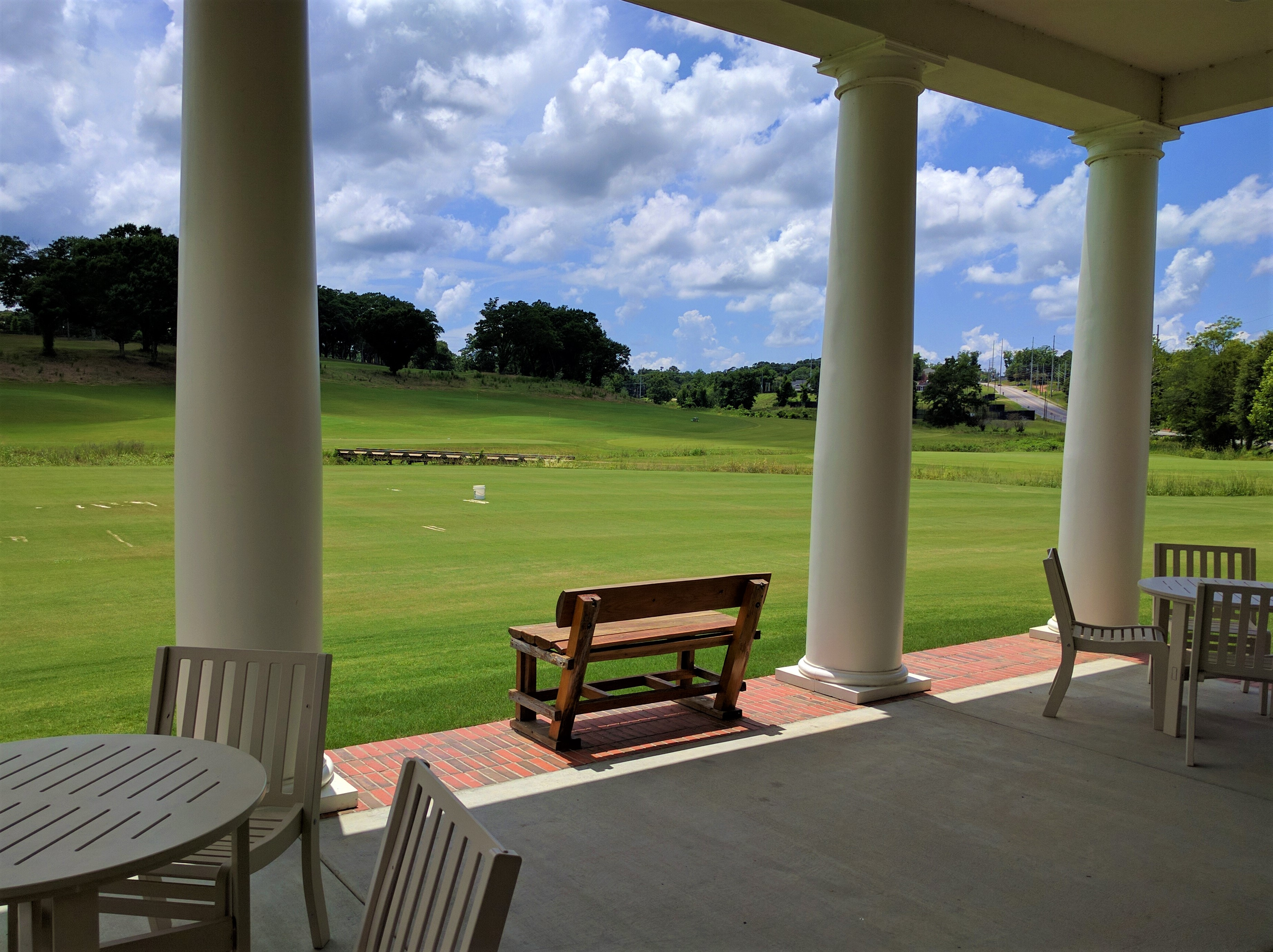
The Troy Golf Clubhouse rear lounge area, facing the golf course

The remaining parts of the course that were left following the construction of Trojan Arena have been converted into what is now called the Troy Golf Practice Course. The $1.5 million renovation of the course was completed in 2013. It uses 40 acres of the original Trojan Oaks Golf Course and created a 9-hole, par-34 practice course plus state-of-the-art putting and chipping greens, a wedge practice area, a full driving range, and a new golf clubhouse. A golf clubhouse has coaches offices and an indoor/outdoor lounge area. The courses hitting bays feature FlightScope Technology for swing analysis, Sam PuttLab for putting analysis, and BodiTrak monitors to measure the body weight shifting of a players swing. It is the only course of its kind on the Sun Belt Conference.

== The Course ==
Note: All tee distances are from the men's (white) tee box

- Hole 1 - (Par 4) The hole is 355 yards (325 m) long and doglegs about 80 degrees to the right 200 yards (200 m) away from the middle tee. There are trees to the right and the ninth hole is to the left.
- Hole 2 - (Par 3) The hole is 179 yards (164 m) long and raises in elevation approximately 15 feet (5 m) from tee to pin. There is a creek/marsh down a hill starting 60 yards (50 m) after the tee and ending 40 yards (40 m) in front of the pin, at a steep incline down and up, respectively.
- Hole 3 - (Par 3) The hole is 143 yards (131 m) long and is relatively flat fairway between the tee box and pin. There is a large sand trap the wraps the entire left of the green and a sharp 20-foot (6 m)-down slope to the right.
- Hole 4 - (Par 5) The hole is 523 yards (478 m) long and plays very straight. The hole is sometime referred to as "The Driving Range" by local students due to the straightness and breadth of the fairway. The tee box is next to a lake that doesn't play in and the fairway is about 350 yards (320 m) long, starting 75 yards (69 m) after the box and ending 100 yards (100 m) before the pin. The green is separated from the fairway by a ravine approximately 20 feet (6 m) wide and 10 feet (3 m) deep.
- Hole 5 - (Par 5) The hole is 486 yards (444 m) long and is one continuous, sweeping curve to the right. The hole is bordered on its right by woods and, up a hill, the sixth hole and on the left by the fifth hole, which is down a hill. There is a lake about 50 yards (50 m) wide about 300 yards (300 m) away and over the lake lies the final fairway and green. The final fairways slopes up from the lake to the green.
- Hole 6 - (Par 4) The hole is 334 yards (305 m) away. There is a 45-degree dogleg to the left about 75 yards (69 m) from the pin with trees blocking a view of the pin. The right of the course is a sharp downhill slope to the 4th hole fairway and 5th hole tee box. After the dogleg the hole is straight with several bunkers around the green.
- Hole 7 - (Par 3) The hole is 175 yards (160 m) long and plays shorter than that. The pin is roughly 30 feet (9 m) lower in elevation than the tee box with fairway from the tee box to the green. One bunker comes into play in the front right of the green.
- Hole 8 - (Par 4) The hole is 390 yards (360 m) long and is the longest par 4 on the course. The tee box looks over a large valley, about 200 yards (200 m) wide, that is in between the box and the pin and has a swampy area covering half of it. A drive of at least 125 yards (114 m) is required to clear the swamp. Two large trees line either side of the fairway and the green ends up being at roughly the same elevation as the tee box. Most locals consider this the toughest green to putt a long distance on.
- Hole 9 - (Par 5) The hole is 462 yards (422 m) away, with a 30-degree dogleg to the right about 175 yards (160 m) down the fairway. The fairway is slim in most places, (less than 30 yards (30 m) wide) with the Troy University track and field facility lining the right side and the first hole lining the left side. The hole is level, without a single bunker, and the green is the largest on the course.

== Gallery ==
Trojan Oaks Practice Course
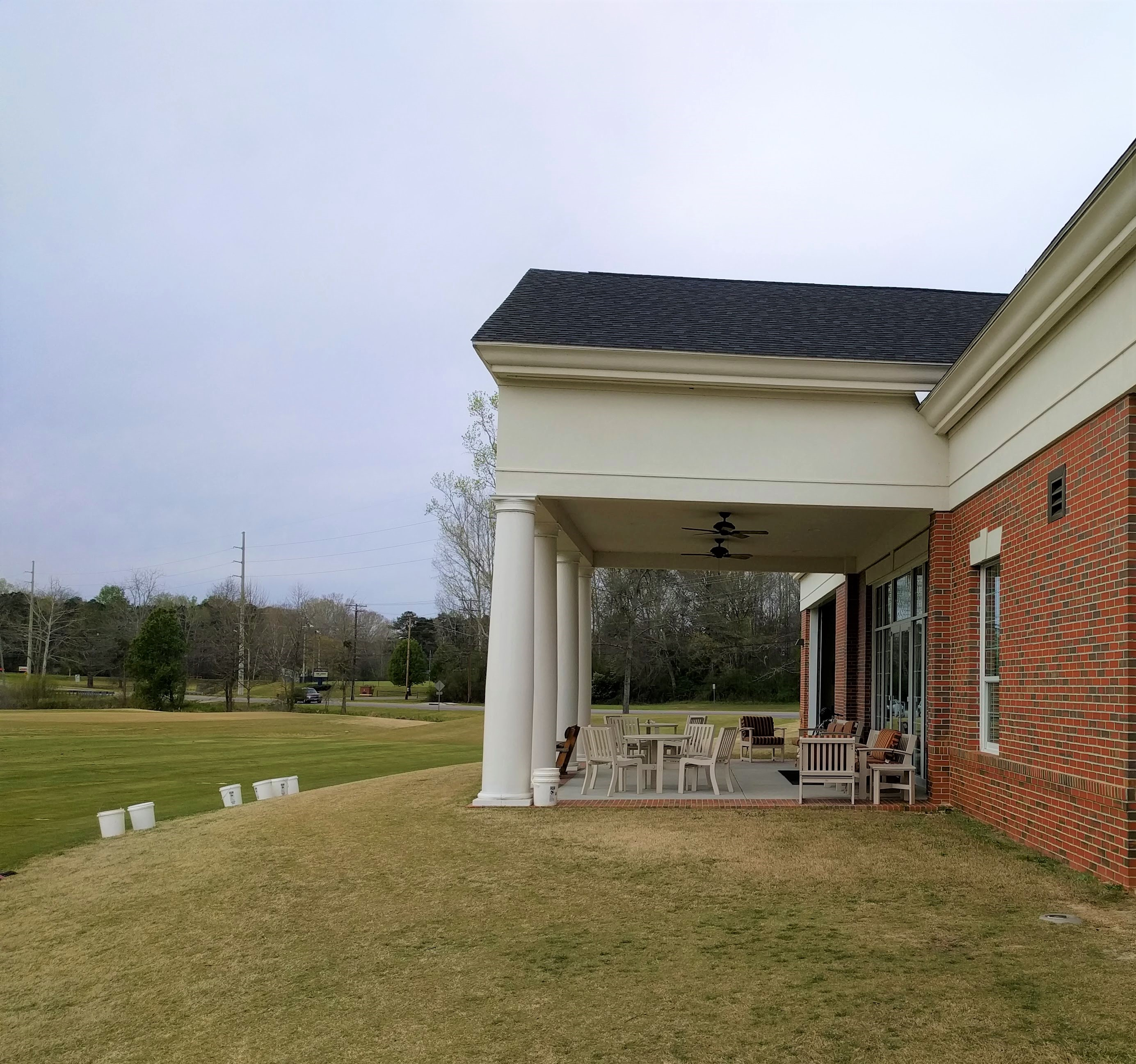
View of the outdoor lounge area

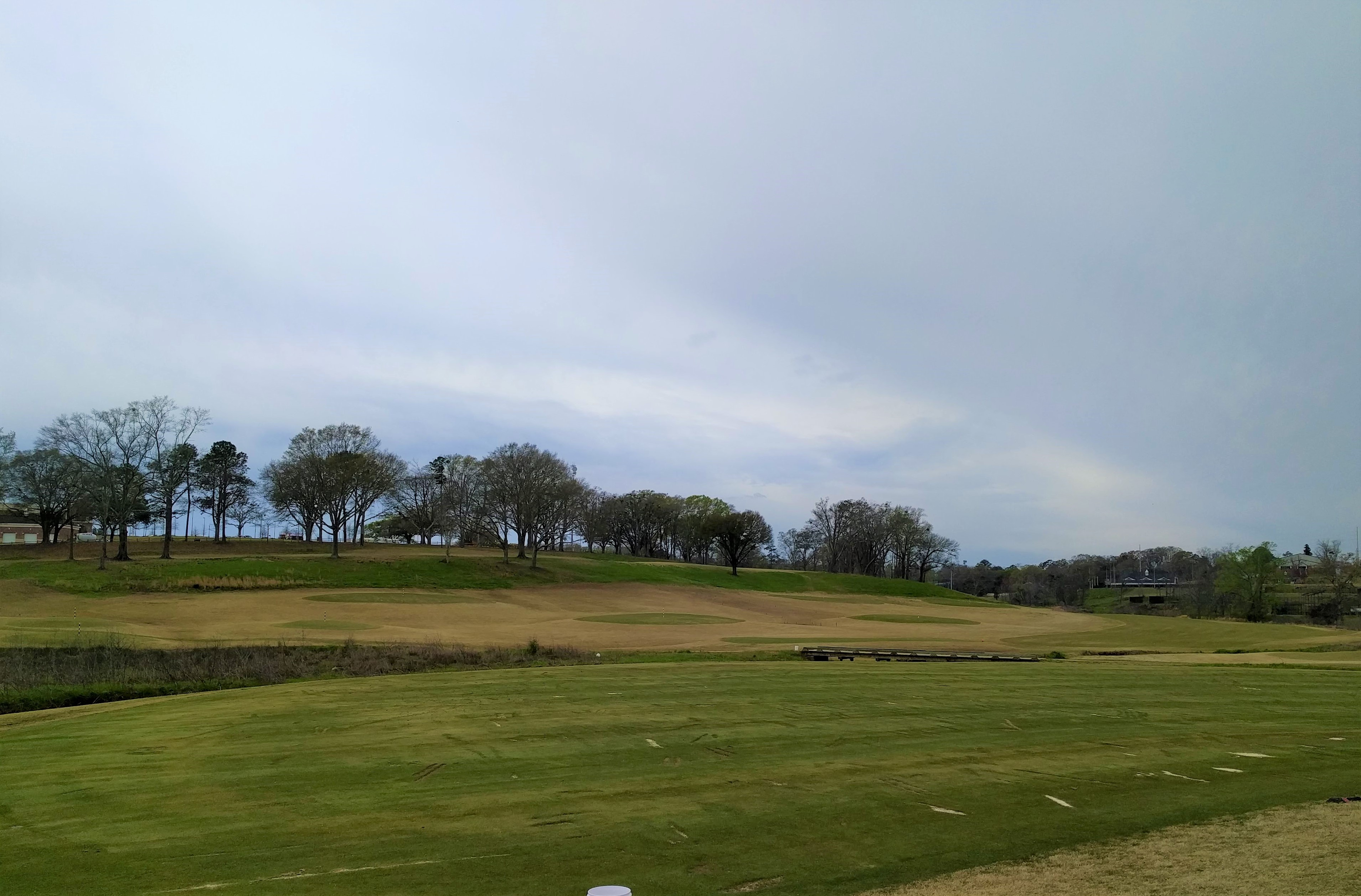
View of the golf course

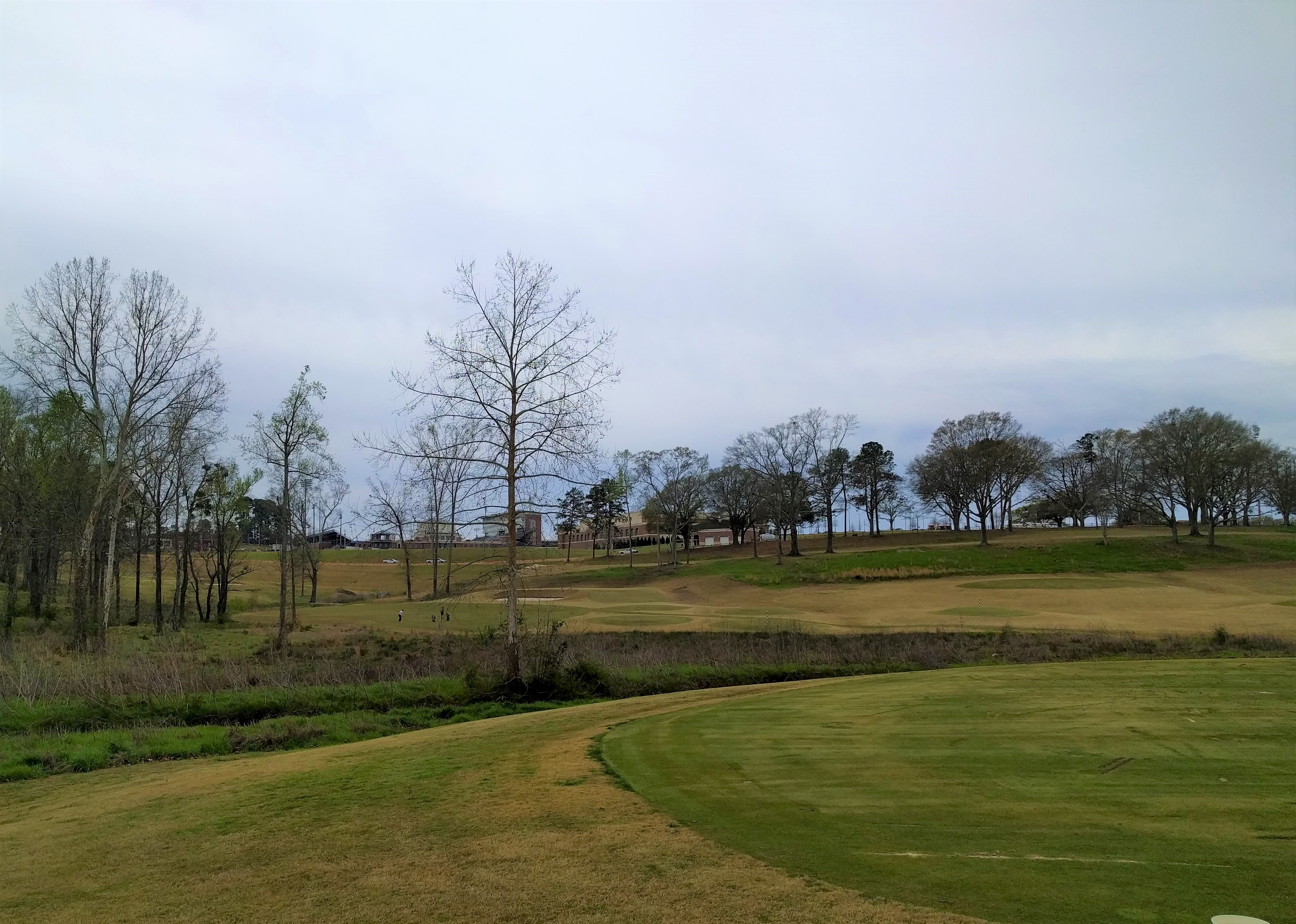
View of the golf course
