= Game Changer =

Game Changer or Game Changers may refer to:

== Music ==
- Game Changer (Johnny Gill album), 2014, or the title song
- Game Changer (Rawsrvnt album), 2015
- Game Changer, an album by Ali Ryerson and the Jazz Flute Big Band
- Game Changer, an album by Golden Child
- "Game Changer", a song by James Reid from James Reid
- "Game Changer", a song by Imelda May from Life Love Flesh Blood
- "Game Changer", a song by Mist from Diamond in the Dirt
- "The Game Changer", a song by American rapper Saigon from The Greatest Story Never Told Chapter 2: Bread and Circuses
- Game Changer (soundtrack), soundtrack album by Thaman S from the 2025 film of the same name

== Film and television ==
- "Game Changer" (Modern Family), an episode of Modern Family
- The Gamechangers, a 2015 BBC-produced docudrama about Rockstar Games and Jack Thompson
- Gareth Thomas: Game Changer - 2014, a documentary production of Zipline Creative Limited
- Survivor: Game Changers, the 34th season of U.S. reality series Survivor
- The Game Changer, a 2017 Chinese action film
- The Game Changers, a 2018 documentary directed by Louie Psihoyos
- Game Changer (game show), a comedy game show on the streaming service Dropout
- Game Changer (film), a 2025 Indian Telugu-language political action thriller film

== Other ==
- GameChanger, a US-based technology developer of sport stats, scorekeeping, and live streaming app
- GameChangers, an IT education and research program
- Game Changer, a proposal of Australia's The Wilderness Society
- Game Changer, a 2019 chess book by Matthew Sadler and Natasha Regan
- Game Changer, a 2021 young-adult fiction book by Neal Shusterman
- Game Changer, alternative title of a painting by Banksy, Painting for Saints
- Game Changers, a 2018–2026 hockey-themed gay romance book series by Rachel Reid
  - Game Changer, a 2018 novel and the first installment of the series

== See also ==
- Game Change (film), a 2012 American HBO political drama film
- Game Change (book), a book by John Heilemann and Mark Halperin about the 2008 United States presidential election
- Double Down: Game Change 2012, a book by John Heilemann and Mark Halperin about the 2012 United States presidential election
- Changing the Game (disambiguation)
- Games for Change, a movement dedicated to using digital games for social change
