= 2014 NCAA Division II baseball tournament =

- Season: 2014
- Teams: 48
- Finals site: USA Baseball National Training Complex; Cary, North Carolina
- Champions: Southern Indiana (2nd title)
- Runner-up: Colorado Mesa (2nd CWS Appearance)
- Winning coach: Tracy Archuleta (2nd title)
- MOP: Matt Chavarria (Southern Indiana)

The 2014 NCAA Division II baseball tournament decided the baseball champion of the NCAA Division II level for the 2014 season. The Screaming Eagles of the University of Southern Indiana won their second national championship as led by head coach Tracy Archuleta. The Screaming Eagles defeated the Mavericks of Colorado Mesa University in the national championship. Southern Indiana pitcher Matt Chavarria was named most outstanding player of the tournament.

== Regionals ==
=== Atlantic Region–West Lawn, PA ===
Hosted by Kutztown at Owls Field

First round
1	Millersville	3
6	Kutztown	2
3	Seton Hill	4
4	Mercyhurst	1
2	Shepherd	4
5	Winston–Salem State	2

Second round
1	Millersville	5
4	Mercyhurst	3
3	Seton Hill	4
2	Shepherd	1
6	Kutztown	1
5	Winston–Salem State	0

Third round
1	Millersville	2
3	Seton Hill	8
2	Shepherd	2
6	Kutztown	3

Semifinals
1	Millersville	3
6	Kutztown	1

Final
3	Seton Hill	3	—
1	Millersville	0	—

=== Central Region–Russellville, AR ===
Hosted by Arkansas Tech at Tech Field

First round
1	Arkansas Tech	4
6	Augustana (SD)	2
3	Minnesota State	11
4	Emporia State	5
2	Southern Arkansas	11
5	Arkansas–Monticello	4

Second round
1	Arkansas State	2
4	Emporia State	3
6	Augustana (SD)	8
5	Arkansas–Monticello	6
3	Minnesota State	6
2	Southern Arkansas	3
1	Arkansas Tech	5
2	Southern Arkansas	0

Third round
4	Emporia State	3
6	Augustana (SD)	0
3	Minnesota State	5
1	Arkansas Tech	2

Final
4	Emporia State	3	—
3	Minnesota State	6	—

=== East Region–Manchester, NH ===
Hosted by Southern New Hampshire at Penmen Field

First round
1	Southern New Hampshire	9
6	Felician	3
3	Wilmington (DE)	4
4	St. Thomas Aquinas	0
2	Franklin Pierce	0
5	Dowling	3

Second round
1	Southern New Hampshire	1
4	St. Thomas Aquinas	6
6	Felician	5
2	Franklin Pierce	0
3	Wilmington (DE)	1
5	Dowling	6
1	Southern New Hampshire	4
3	Wilmington (DE)	3

Third round
4	St. Thomas Aquinas	8
6	Felician	5
5	Dowling	4
1	Southern New Hampshire	3

Final
4	St. Thomas Aquinas	4	3
5	Dowling	2	0

=== Midwest Region–Evansville, IN ===
Hosted by Southern Indiana at USI Baseball Field

First round
1	Southern Indiana	5
6	Indianapolis	3
3	Drury	0
4	Wayne State	1
2	Grand Valley State	9
5	Lake Erie	4

Second round
1	Southern Indiana	3
3	Drury	9
6	Indianapolis	3
5	Lake Erie	4
4	Wayne State	2
2	Grand Valley State	7
1	Southern Indiana	6
4	Wayne State	2

Third round
3	Drury	16
5	Lake Erie	3
2	Grand Valley State	2
1	Southern Indiana	5

Semifinals
3	Drury	5
2	Grand Valley State	2

Final
3	Drury	2
1	Southern Indiana	4

=== South Region–Tampa, FL ===
Hosted by Tampa at University of Tampa Baseball Field

First round
1	Tampa	3
6	Stillman	2
3	Delta State	4
4	Florida Southern	8
2	Lynn	1
5	Alabama–Huntsville	4

Second round
1	Tampa	7
3	Delta State	3
4	Florida Southern	1
5	Alabama–Huntsville	11
6	Stillman	6
2	Lynn	14

Third round
1	Tampa	9
5	Alabama–Huntsville	5
4	Florida Southern	4
2	Lynn	2

Semifinals
5	Alabama–Huntsville	2
4	Florida Southern	7

Final
1	Tampa	3	—
4	Florida Southern	0	—

=== South Central Region–Grand Junction, CO ===
Hosted by Colorado Mesa at Suplizio Field

First round
1	Colorado Mesa	9
6	New Mexico Highlands	8
3	Texas A&M–Kingsville	9
4	St. Edward's	2
2	West Texas A&M	13
5	Tarleton State	10

Second round
1	Colorado Mesa	12
4	St. Edward's	8
3	Texas A&M–Kingsville	3
2	West Texas A&M	17
6	New Mexico Highlands	9
5	Tarleton State	13

Third round
1	Colorado Mesa	9
2	West Texas A&M	6
3	Texas A&M–Kingsville	8
5	Tarleton State	6

Semifinals
2	West Texas A&M	4
3	Texas A&M–Kingsville	7

Final
1	Colorado Mesa	8	7
3	Texas A&M–Kingsville	9	6

=== Southeast Region–Greenwood, SC ===
Hosted by Lander at Dolney Stadium

First round
1	Lander	4
6	Catawba	1
3	Columbus State	3
4	USC Aiken	2
2	Mount Olive	0
5	Georgia College	10

Second round
1	Lander	12
4	USC Aiken	8
3	Columbus State	10
5	Georgia College	3
6	Catawba	16
2	Mount Olive	4

Third round
1	Lander	9
3	Columbus State	3
5	Georgia College	0
6	Catawba	5

Semifinals
3	Columbus State	6
6	Catawba	5

Final
1	Lander	5	5
3	Columbus State	19	2

=== West Region–San Diego, CA ===
Hosted by UC San Diego at Triton Ballpark

First round
1	UC San Diego	3
6	Sonoma State	0
3	California Baptist	5
4	Cal Poly Pomona	3
2	Chico State	5
5	Dixie State	4

Second round
1	UC San Diego	20
4	Cal Poly Pomona	5
3	California Baptist	0
2	Chico State	2
6	Sonoma State	5
5	Dixie State	6

Third round
1	UC San Diego	5
2	Chico State	6
3	California Baptist	5
5	Dixie State	2

Semifinals
1	UC San Diego	14
3	California Baptist	5

Final
2	Chico State	3	—
1	UC San Diego	1	—

== College World Series ==
=== Participants ===
School	Conference	Record (conference)	Head coach	Previous CWS appearances	Best CWS finish
Chico State	CCAA	43–13 (29–10)	Dave Taylor	8 (last: 2012)	1st
Colorado Mesa	RMAC	44–11 (31–7)	Chris Hanks	1 (last: 2009)	5th
Lander	Peach Belt	51–7 (24–6)	Kermit Smith	0 (last: never)	N/A
Minnesota State	Northern Sun	45–9 (28–4)	Matt Magers	7 (last: 2013)	2nd
Seton Hill	PSAC	40–15 (22–6)	Marc Marizzaldi	0 (last: never)	N/A
Southern Indiana	Great Lakes Valley	45–12 (29–5)	Tracy Archuleta	2 (last: 2010)	1st
St. Thomas Aquinas	ECC	38–16 (16–8)	Scott Muscat	0 (last: never)	N/A
Tampa	SSC	51–2 (22–1)	Joe Urso	15 (last: 2013)	1st

=== Results ===
==== Bracket ====
Hosted by University of Mount Olive and Town of Cary at USA Baseball National Training Complex

First round
Southern Indiana	4
Tampa	3
Lander	6
Chico State	4
Tampa	14
Chico State	6
Minnesota State	2
Seton Hill	4
Colorado Mesa	5
St. Thomas Aquinas	4
Minnesota State	6
St. Thomas Aquinas	1

Second round
Southern Indiana	6
Lander	5
Lander	3
Tampa	7
Seton Hill	2
Colorado Mesa	6
Seton Hill	1
Minnesota State	3

Semifinals
Southern Indiana	1	4
Minnesota State	5	3
Colorado Mesa	1	3
Tampa	3	2

National Championship
Southern Indiana	3
Colorado Mesa	2

==== Game results ====
Date	Game	Winner	Score	Loser	Notes
May 24	Game 1	Southern Indiana	4–3	Tampa	
May 24	Game 2	Lander	6–4	Chico State	
May 25	Game 3	Seton Hill	4–2	Minnesota State	
May 25	Game 4	Colorado Mesa	5–4	St. Thomas Aquinas	
May 26	Game 5	Tampa	14–6	Chico State	Chico State eliminated
May 26	Game 6	Southern Indiana	6–5	Lander	
May 27	Game 7	Minnesota State	6–1	St. Thomas Aquinas	St. Thomas Aquinas eliminated
May 27	Game 8	Colorado Mesa	6–2	Seton Hill	
May 28	Game 9	Tampa	7–3	Lander	Lander eliminated
May 28	Game 10	Minnesota State	3–1	Seton Hill	Seton Hill eliminated
May 29	Game 11	Tampa	3–1	Colorado Mesa	
May 29	Game 12	Minnesota State	5–1	Southern Indiana	
May 30	Game 13	Colorado Mesa	3–2	Tampa	Tampa eliminated
May 30	Game 14	Southern Indiana	4–3	Minnesota State	Minnesota State eliminated
May 31	Game 15	Southern Indiana	3–2	Colorado Mesa	Southern Indiana wins National Championship
