= UC San Diego Tritons =

Collegiate athletic team in California

- University: University of California, San Diego
- Nickname: Tritons
- NCAA: Division I
- Conferences: Big West (primary, WCC in 2027); MPSF (swimming & diving, fencing, men's rowing); WCC (women’s rowing); Pac-12 (men’s soccer)
- Athletic director: Andy Fee
- Location: San Diego, California
- Basketball arena: LionTree Arena
- Baseball stadium: Triton Ballpark
- Softball stadium: Triton Softball Stadium
- Soccer stadium: Triton Soccer Stadium
- Other venues: Canyonview Aquatic Center; Mission Bay Park; Northview Tennis Courts; Triton Track and Field Stadium; UC San Diego Boathouse
- Colors: Blue and gold
- Mascot: King Triton
- Fight song: Triton Fight Song
- Website: ucsdtritons.com

The UC San Diego Tritons are the intercollegiate athletic teams that represent the University of California, San Diego. The Tritons compete in NCAA Division I as a member of the Big West Conference (BWC).

== History ==
=== NCAA Division II ===
During UC San Diego's time in NCAA Division II and the California Collegiate Athletic Association starting in the 2000–01 season, UC San Diego placed in the top 5 in the Division II NACDA Directors' Cup standings nine times, including three 2nd-place finishes. NCSA Athletic Recruiting ranked the Tritons as the nation's top Division II program for eight consecutive years.

=== Move to Division I ===
In 2010, UC San Diego considered elevating its athletics to NCAA Division I for all sports. They were looking to join the Big West Conference. However, there were several problems. After the Big West added the University of Hawaii in 2010, they would have 10 teams, meaning any extra member would require more conference games in basketball, upsetting the current schedule balance. In addition, in order to meet the minimum Division I scholarship requirements, the student body would need to vote for a fee increase sometime during the 2011–2012 academic year. After the Big West elected not to invite UC San Diego in May 2011, plans were put on hold and UC San Diego remained a Division II team. However, a student-led movement resulted in a vote on a fee increase for UC San Diego students in the hopes to enhance the school's chances of becoming a Division I school. In March 2012, the UC San Diego student body rejected an increase in activity fees to support the move to Division I. The vote fell 11,407 to 6,470 (51% of the student body voted).

In January 2016, Associated Students UC San Diego unanimously approved the wording of a new Division I referendum. In May, UC San Diego undergraduates voted to increase athletic fees by $480 per year and transition UC San Diego athletics to Division I. The fee increase is meant to fund the athletic scholarships required for NCAA Division I schools. The move was approved by the UC San Diego Academic Senate in December 2016. UC San Diego's move was contingent upon an invitation to join the Big West Conference.

Big West Conference logo in UC San Diego colors

In a separate move by the Big West Conference to sponsor men's volleyball, Big West teams from the MPSF split to join their own conference that includes UC San Diego as an affiliate member starting in the 2017–18 school year (2018 season). The Tritons' joining the Big West as an affiliate for men's volleyball was not an indicator that the Tritons would be accepted as a full member yet since UC San Diego had long played the sport in the MPSF at a Division I level and was part of the original coalition talks with the Big West to split from MPSF men's volleyball.

Early in April 2017, the San Diego Union-Tribune reported that the Big West had rejected UC San Diego's application to join the conference. The Big West commission overseeing new members into the conference consists of the Presidents and Chancellors of every member school. There has not been a formal public confirmation of the rejection, but UC San Diego may still attempt to make moves to join the Big West or another conference (such as the Western Athletic Conference) until its 2018 deadline set by the referendum.

However, on November 27, 2017, UC San Diego was accepted and officially started the journey towards the Big West conference along with Cal State Bakersfield. UC San Diego's women's water polo team joined the Big West in 2019, and UC San Diego began the required four year transition period on July 1, 2020 to be a full member on July 1, 2024.

=== NCAA Division I ===
On July 1, 2024, UC San Diego became fully eligible for NCAA Division I postseason play. The same season, UC San Diego became the first ever program to send both their men's and women's basketball teams to the NCAA tournament in their first year of eligibility.

On September 3, 2025, it was announced that UC San Diego will join the West Coast Conference as a competing member starting July 1, 2027.

== Sports sponsored ==
Men's sports	Women's sports
Baseball	Basketball
Basketball	Cross country
Cross country	Fencing
Fencing	Rowing
Golf	Soccer
Rowing	Softball
Soccer	Swimming and diving
Swimming and diving	Tennis
Tennis	Track and field
Track and field	Volleyball
Volleyball	Water polo
Water polo	

A member of the Big West Conference, UC San Diego sponsors teams in ten men's, eleven women's, and one coed NCAA sanctioned sports. The school also sponsors a varsity men's rowing team, but men's rowing is not sanctioned by the NCAA.

The rowing teams are members of the Western Intercollegiate Rowing Association. The men's water polo team is a member of the Western Water Polo Association. The fencing team is a member of the Intercollegiate Fencing Conference of Southern California. Men's volleyball and women's water polo both compete in the Big West Conference, with the former joining that league in 2017 and the latter in 2019, ahead of the school becoming a full member of the Big West on July 1, 2020 and beginning the transition to Division I.

From Fall 2000 to Spring 2017, UC San Diego teams competed primarily in the California Collegiate Athletic Association. The school was awarded the Hiegert Commissioner's Trophy (awarded to the CCAA school with the highest aggregate ranking in eight sports) seven times—five consecutive years from 2006–2010 and again in 2016 and 2017. National champions are highlighted in bold and italicized.

=== Baseball ===
The UC San Diego Tritons baseball team is the varsity intercollegiate baseball team of the University of California, San Diego. The team plays its home games at Triton Ballpark.

=== Basketball ===
On Mar. 13, 2025, both the men's and women's basketball teams won the Big West Conference to qualify for their respective NCAA Tournaments in Division I. Their feats make UC San Diego the first school to qualify for the NCAA Tournament for which both the men's and women's teams were in the first year of eligibility.

==== Men's basketball ====
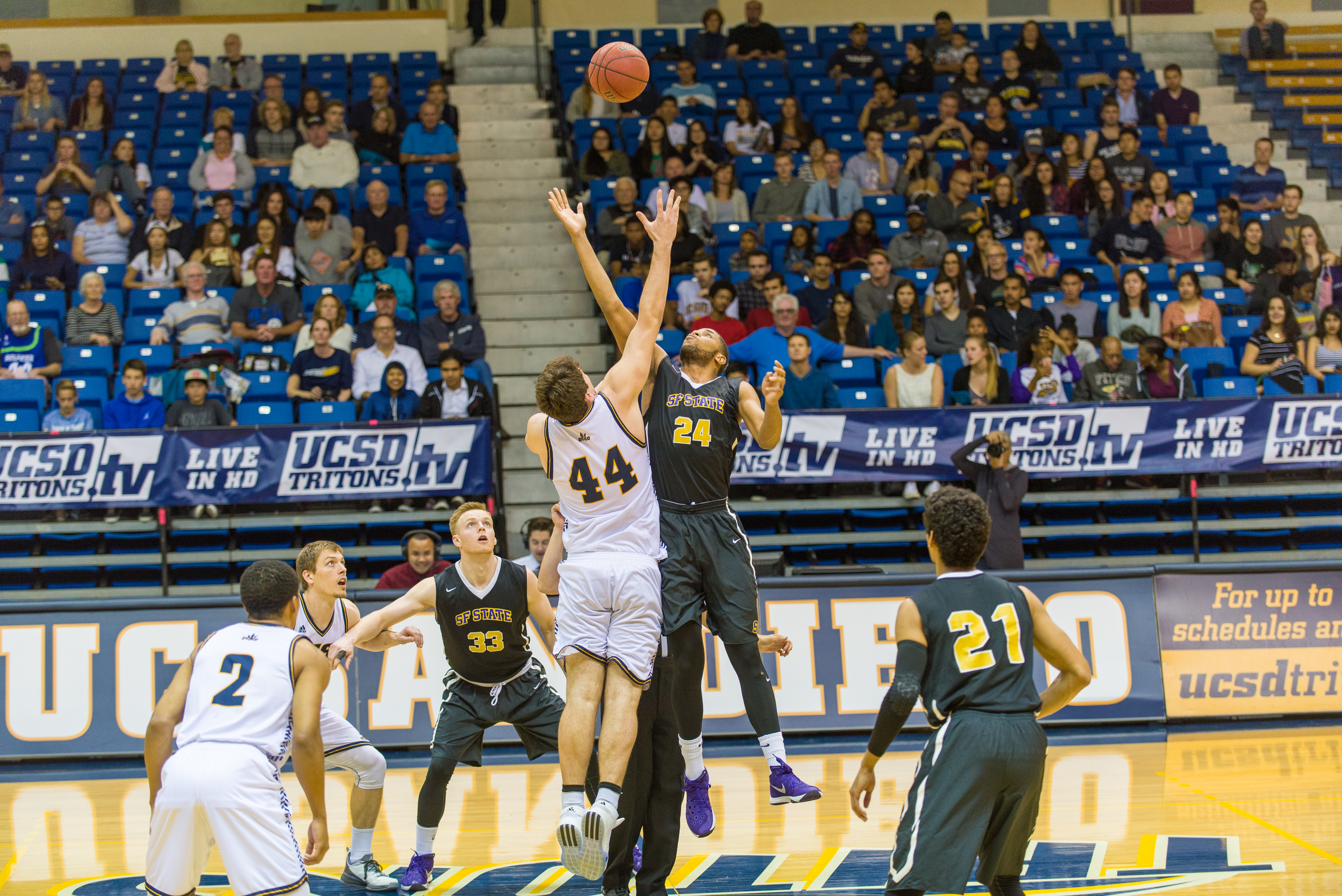
UC San Diego (in white) v San Francisco State in 2016

The UC San Diego Tritons men's basketball team represents the University of California, San Diego. The team plays its home games at LionTree Arena.

==== Women's basketball ====
The UC San Diego women's basketball team plays its home games at LionTree Arena. It has won the CCAA five times, during the 2006–07, 2008–09, 2009–10, 2012–13, and 2016–17 seasons. The Tritons advanced to the NCAA West Regional 1st Round in 2003–04, 2005–06, and 2009–10, and reached the 2nd Round in 2007–08 and 2008–09. They were the NCAA West Region runners-up in 2011–12 and 2015–16. In 2006–07, they reached the NCAA Final Four.

**Year**	2000–01	2001–02	2002–03	2003–04	2004–05	2005–06	2006–07	2007–08	2008–09	2009–10	2010–11	2011–12	2012–13	2013–14	2014–15	2015–16	2016–17
**Record**	15–12	13–14	10–17	15–13	17–10	23–5	27–5	25–10	27–5	25–5	20–11	30–3	22–11	16–11	21–3	26–5	23–7

=== Fencing ===
The UC San Diego men's and women's fencing squads compete at Main Gym and RIMAC Arena. They compete in the Intercollegiate Fencing Conference of Southern California at the NCAA Division I level. The Tritons won this league's championship every year between 2005 and 2016. Under former head coach, Heidi Runyan, at least one Triton has qualified for the NCAA Division I Championships annually since 2005. The highest NCAA finish the Tritons have garnered was 13th in 2008 when six qualified to compete. In 2018, the men's and women's squads finished 14th in the NCAA circuit after sending five fencers to Penn State in State College, Pennsylvania where the competition was held. The team hosts the Annual BladeRunner Regional Open Circuit tournament as part of the United States Fencing Association.

=== Rowing ===
The UC San Diego rowing team was established in 1966 and practices on Mission Bay, roughly 10 miles from the main university campus. The rowing team is centered out of the Coggeshall Rowing Center on El Carmel Point in Mission Bay which houses the San Diego Rowing Club, the University of San Diego collegiate rowing program, and the UC San Diego collegiate rowing program.

==== Men's rowing ====
UC San Diego Tritons men's rowing
- Founded: 1966
- Head coach: Jeff Collett (1st season)
- Location: Mission Bay
- Facility: Coggeshall Rowing Center
- Colors: Blue and gold

NCAA Championship appearances
- 2009, 2011, 2013, 2017, 2018, 2019, 2021

Conference championships
- 2018, 2019, 2021

The Tritons are members of the Western Sprints Conference within the Intercollegiate Rowing Association. The Western Sprints conference has two automatic qualification positions for the IRA National Championship Regatta. The Tritons also have historic association with the Western Intercollegiate Rowing Association (WIRA) conference prior to the establishment of the Western Sprints Regatta. The Tritons have made six appearances at the National Championship, having first qualified in 2009. The next appearances were in 2011, 2013, 2017, 2018, and 2019 with the 2017–2019 seasons having been the only consecutive appearances in program history.

Having never been nationally ranked prior to the 2007 season, UC San Diego has now spent time ranked in the top 25 of the U.S. Rowing Collegiate Poll in six of the last 11 seasons going into the 2020 season.

The Western Sprints conference includes UC San Diego, University of San Diego, Santa Clara University, and Gonzaga University. The Tritons secured a conference championship with a sweep of the event in both 2018 and 2019 with the Varsity 8, Junior Varsity 8, and Third Varsity 8 enjoying a first place finish.

UC San Diego has also enjoyed success at the WIRA Championship: a regional championship that takes places on Lake Natoma in Folsom, California. At WIRA's, the Triton's have always secured a position on the podium. The Tritons won the overall team championship in 2006, 2011, and 2019, including a monumental sweep of the Varsity 8, Second Varsity 8, and Third Varsity 8 races in 2019. Following the sweep, Zach Johnson, the head coach at the time, was named WIRA Coach of the Year.

==== Women's rowing ====
UC San Diego Tritons women's rowing
- Founded: 1966
- Head coach: Colin Truex (7th season)
- Location: Mission Bay
- Facility: Coggeshall Rowing Center
- Colors: Blue and gold

NCAA Championship appearances
- 2013, 2017, 2018, 2019

The Triton Women's team is a part of the NCAA Division I. On March 26, 2021, UC San Diego and the Colonial Athletic Association jointly announced that the Triton's women's rowing team had joined the conference effective immediately.

=== Soccer ===
==== Men's soccer ====
The UC San Diego men's soccer team hosts its opponents at Triton Soccer Stadium at RIMAC Field. In 2003, 2013, and 2014, it advanced to the first round of the NCAA West Regional. In 2013, they were the CCAA tournament runners-up. The best season in team history occurred in 2016, when the team advanced to the NCAA Division II Semifinals after claiming the CCAA league championship, CCAA tournament championship, and the NCAA West Region title.

**Year**	2000	2001	2002	2003	2004	2005	2006	2007	2008	2009	2010	2011	2012	2013	2014	2015	2016	2017
**Record**	11–5–2	6–9–1	11–6–0	11–7–1	9–4–4	11–5–2	7–10–2	5–9–3	10–6–2	7–9–3	8–6–4	10–8–0	9–4–4	14–3–5	10–4–6	6–6–6	19–3–2	10–2–5

==== Women's soccer ====
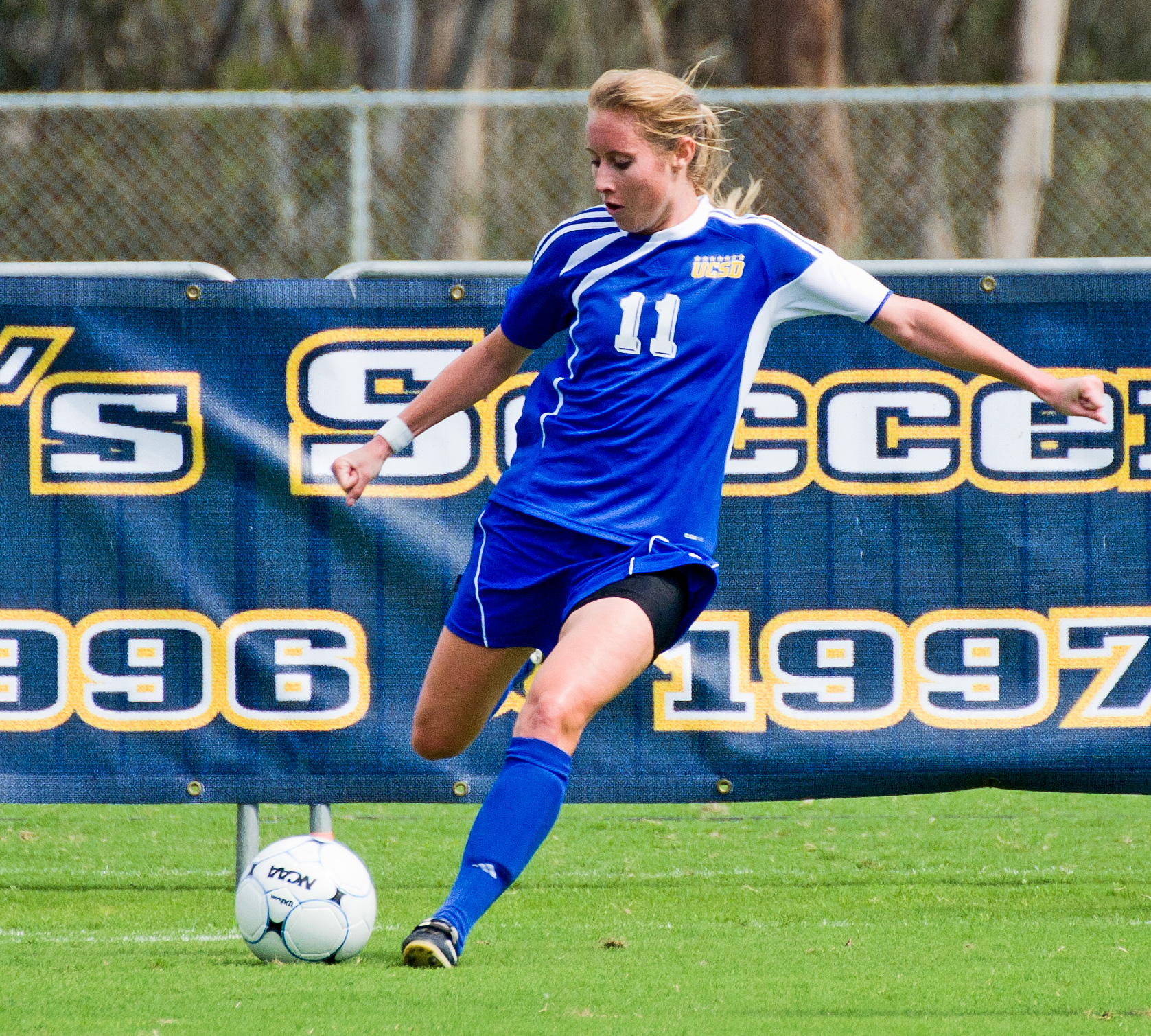
A striker for the UC San Diego Tritons women's soccer team in 2011

The UC San Diego women's soccer team plays its home matches at Triton Soccer Stadium at RIMAC Field. In its first two seasons of Division II play, 2000 and 2001, the team was crowned CCAA Champions and NCAA National Champions. The Tritons again won the CCAA in 2002, 2003, 2005, 2006, 2008, 2011, 2012, 2015, 2016, and 2017, reaching the NCAA Final Four in 2003 and 2017 and being named NCAA Runners-Up in 2010 and 2012.

They reached the NCAA West Regional 2nd Round in 2005, 2008, and 2009 and were named the regional runners-up in 2016, but were eliminated in the first round in 2002, 2007, 2011, and 2015. Since its promotion to Division II in 2000, the team has failed to reach the NCAA playoffs only three times, in 2004, 2013, and 2014, and has posted an undefeated CCAA record once, going 12–0 in league play and winning the tournament and division in 2016.

**Year**	**2000**	**2001**	2002	2003	2004	2005	2006	2007	2008	2009	2010	2011	2012	2013	2014	2015	2016	2017	2018
**Record**	**21–2–0**	**21–2–0**	15–5–2	18–3–1	14–4–1	18–4–0	20–2–2	12–4–2	15–4–4	15–5–2	19–3–4	13–3–4	17–3–4	7–6–5	9–6–3	15–6–1	19–3–0	17–2–3	19–3–2

=== Softball ===
The UC San Diego softball team plays its home games at Triton Softball Field, adjacent to RIMAC Arena. The Tritons advanced to the NCAA West Regionals in 2001, 2002, 2007, 2008, 2009. 2011, 2012, 2013, and 2014. In 2011, they were the NCAA National Champions, having won the NCAA West Region and the CCAA. In 2012, they won the CCAA tournament and repeated as NCAA West Region Champions, and were eventually crowned the NCAA National Runners-Up. They won their second CCAA tournament in 2016.

**Year**	2001	2002	2003	2004	2005	2006	2007	2008	2009	2010	**2011**	2012	2013	2014	2015	2016	2017
**Record**	34–17	35–25	24–32	29–27	19–31	24–28	35–27	32–24	30–25	30–20	**45–13**	45–23	33–25	34–18	25–25	37–21	30–22

=== Swimming ===
==== Men's Swimming ====
The UC San Diego men's swim team competes in the Mountain Pacific Sports Federation, practicing and competing at Canyonview Aquatic Center. Since joining Division I prior to the 2021-22 season, the Tritons have finished fourth and fifth in the 2022 and 2023 MPSF Championships, respectively. In 2022, Senior Ivan Kurakin won the 200 yard freestyle, while Freshman Aidan Simpson won the 200 yard breaststroke.

==== Women's Swimming ====
The UC San Diego women's swim team competes in the Mountain Pacific Sports Federation, practicing and competing at Canyonview Aquatic Center. In 2022, their first year as a Division I program, the Triton women upset the then 5-time defending champions Hawaii to win the MPSF Championships, their first Conference Championship in any program since joining Division I. Fueled by 2 wins from Junior Katja Pavicevic (200 IM, 200 Breaststroke), as well as individual wins from Julissa Arzave (1650 Freestyle), Ciara Franke (200 Freestyle), and Tina Reuter (400 IM), and multiple relay victories, the Tritons edged out Hawaii by a meager 12.5 points.

In 2023, the Tritons were unable to repeat as champions, finishing second behind Hawaii.

=== Tennis ===
==== Men's tennis ====
The UC San Diego men's tennis team competes in the Intercollegiate Tennis Association and plays its home games at the Northview Tennis Courts. The team advanced to the NCAA Division II National Championships each year between 2001 and 2007, and returned there in 2010, 2011, 2013, and 2014. The team's best finish at the NCAA tournament came in 2007, when it was eliminated in the Final Four.

**Year**	2001	2002	2003	2004	2005	2006	2007	2008	2009	2010	2011	2012	2013	2014	2015	2016	2017
**Record**	10–10	19–4	18–6	18–10	15–7	14–10	18–7	11–12	12–11	12–11	20–0	13–10	13–11	15–10	12–9	14–10	11–11

==== Women's tennis ====
The UC San Diego women's tennis team competes in the Intercollegiate Tennis Association and plays its home matches at the Northview Tennis Courts. They were undefeated CCAA champions every season between 2004 and 2009, advancing to the NCAA West Regional each year. They again won the CCAA in 2010, advancing to the regional championship with a 9–1 conference record.

**Year**	2000	2001	2002	2003	2004	2005	2006	2007	2008	2009	2010	2011	2012	2013	2014	2015	2016	2017
**Record**	20–3	16–6	23–4	17–6	18–9	20–4	14–8	14–9	14–11	15–6	13–8	10–8	8–15	14–7	9–16	12–13	12–10	16–5

=== Volleyball ===
==== Men's volleyball (Division I) ====
The UC San Diego men's volleyball team competes in the Big West Conference, having joined from the Mountain Pacific Sports Federation for the 2018 season (2017–18 school year). The team's home matches against its Division I opponents are played at LionTree Arena. The program's best finish in the new millennium came in 2009, when the team ended the season ranked ninth in the MPSF.

**Year**	2001	2002	2003	2004	2005	2006	2007	2008	2009	2010	2011	2012	2013	2014	2015	2016	2017
**Record**	6–21	7–23	6–22	8–21	2–24	2–27	5–23	10–19	13–15	11–19	9–20	9–19	7–22	4–23	2–26	5–23	7–20

==== Women's volleyball ====
The UC San Diego women's volleyball team plays its home matches at LionTree Arena. The program has made the postseason every year except 2005 and 2014 as well as the NCAA West Regional every year except 2005, 2014, 2015, and 2017. In 2001, the Tritons reached the NCAA Division II Final Four. The team won the CCAA regular season in 2004 with an undefeated league record.

**Year**	2000	2001	2002	2003	2004	2005	2006	2007	2008	2009	2010	2011	2012	2013	2014	2015	2016	2017
**Record**	21–10	25–7	26–5	25–5	30–2	19–8	26–3	20–8	21–7	29–3	19–9	22–6	20–11	26–6	14–12	20–12	13–13	10–7

=== Water Polo ===
==== Men's water polo ====
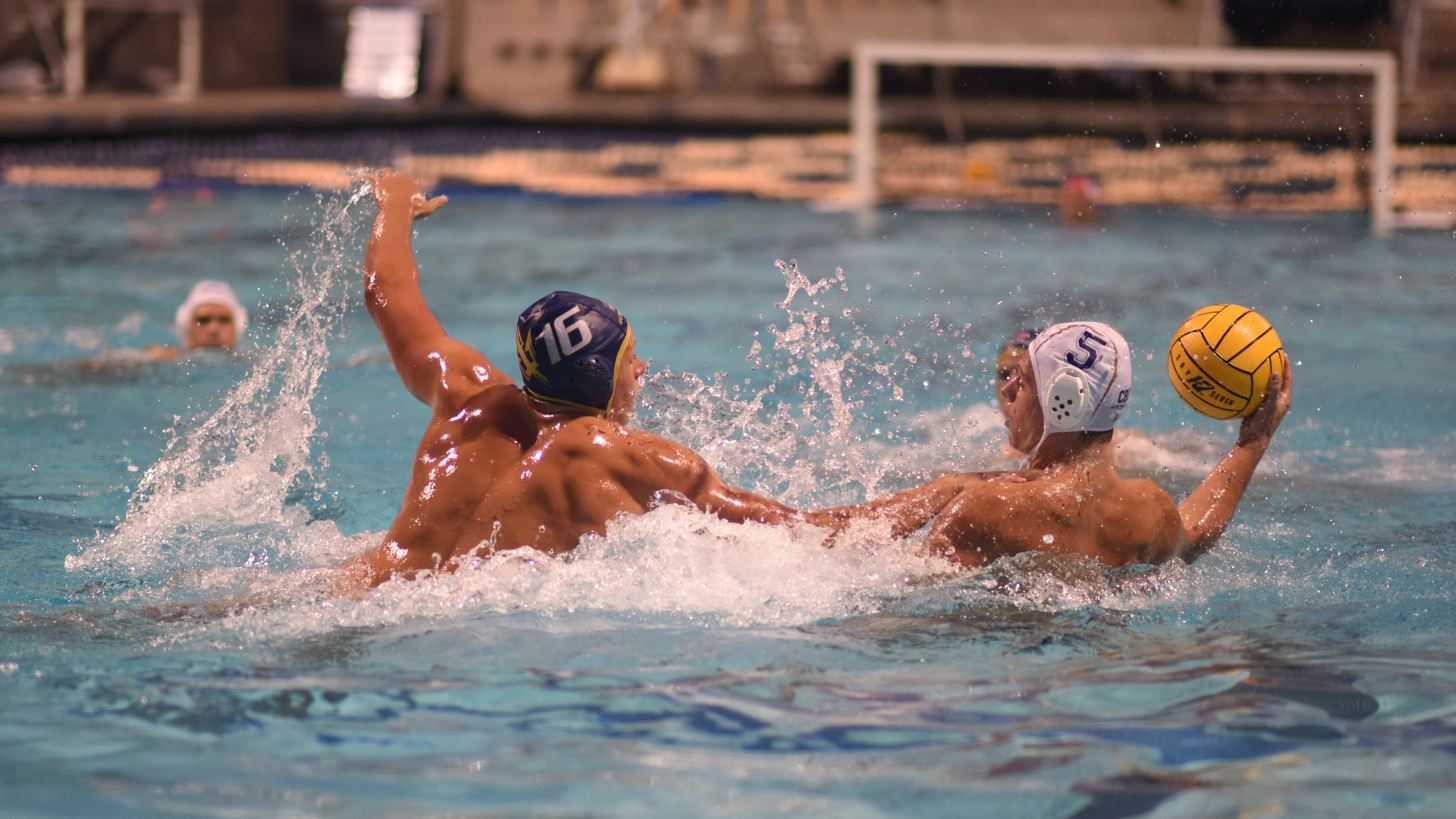
UC San Diego men's water polo game in 2018

The UC San Diego men's water polo team competes in the Western Water Polo Association against Division I opponents. They host their opponents at Canyonview Aquatic Center in Warren College. The Tritons have reached the NCAA Final Four in 1995, 1998, 1999, 2000, 2006, 2011, 2014, and 2015. They were the NCAA National Runners-Up in 2000.

**Year**	2000	2001	2002	2003	2004	2005	2006	2007	2008	2009	2010	2011	2012	2013	2014	2015	2016	2017
**Record**	21–9	20–7	19–13	19–10	20–12	24–8	26–6	12–17	20–10	14–14	13–12	17–11	16–8	14–14	16–11	15–15	15–8	11–14
**NCAA Finish**	2nd	10th	10th	8th	12th	10th	3rd	14th	10th	10th	14th	4th	10th	11th	4th	4th	14th	13th

==== Women's water polo ====
The UC San Diego women's water polo team competes in the Big West Conference against Division I opponents. They host their opponents at Canyonview Aquatic Center in Warren College.

**Year**	2000	2001	2002	2003	2004	2005	2006	2007	2008	2009	2010	2011	2012	2013	2014	2015	2016	2017	2018	2019
**Record**	14–14	20–13	22–13	24–14	16–20	18–17	16–18	19–13	19–17	12–20	18–19	18–20	21–14	26–15	27–13	19–21	28–11	19–15	24–12	22–14
**Final National Ranking**	13th	12th	9th	12th	17th	17th	17th	14th	16th	–	18th	14th	–	12th	12th	20th	T-9th	T-10th	16th	14th

== Esports ==
UC San Diego has fielded multiple esports teams in a variety of games, both for team play and individual competition. Most notably the Splatoon team, Triton Splatoon, competed in the playoffs of two of the Twitch streamed Proton Splat Leagues for Splatoon 2, taking 4th place in season 4 after being defeated in the first round and going on an impressive run through the losers bracket, and 1st in season 6 after a close 11 game match across two best of 7 sets against team New Horizon in a rematch from their semifinals match.

== Former varsity sports ==
=== Football ===
UC San Diego has not fielded a football team except in Fall 1968 when a newly formed pigskin organization turned in a winless season and then folded for lack of interest. Since then, the subject of bringing NCAA football back to UC San Diego has been a recurring topic. Tom Ham, a local restaurateur and a supporter of UC San Diego football since the 1960s, has said that UC San Diego would have no future in San Diego without "big-time" football. Proponents of a major football team have projected benefits that include greater school spirit and a more well-rounded school experience for students as well as enhancing the school's national profile. Opposition to "big-time" football comes from a wide range of school faculty and administrators such Daniel Wulbert, Revelle College provost, who says that any boost to school spirit would not be worth the sacrifice, and that he wants UC San Diego to "have a life for reasons other than watching hired athletes come and play." Both sides acknowledge that adding an 80- to 100-man football team would not only cost some US$1–1.5M annually, but that the initial outlay in equipment and facilities would be in the tens of millions. Furthermore, in order to comply with Title IX's requirement for equal sports opportunities for both sexes, some three women's teams (80–100 athletes) would have to be added, or three existing men's teams disbanded. Without the expense of football, UC San Diego has been characterized as having "the best all-around program, with the most success by the most student-athletes" in San Diego.

== Championships ==
=== Appearances ===
The UC San Diego Tritons competed in the NCAA Tournament across 20 active sports (1 co-ed, 9 men's, and 10 women's) 222 times at the Division II level.

- Baseball (11): 2007, 2008, 2009, 2010, 2011, 2012, 2014, 2015, 2017, 2018, 2019
- Men's basketball (5): 2008, 2016, 2017, 2018, 2019
- Women's basketball (12): 2004, 2006, 2007, 2008, 2009, 2010, 2012, 2013, 2016, 2017, 2018, 2019
- Men's cross country (4): 2001, 2003, 2007, 2019
- Women's cross country (7): 2002, 2003, 2004, 2005, 2006, 2007, 2014
- Fencing (24): 1994, 1995, 1997, 1998, 1999, 2001, 2002, 2003, 2004, 2005, 2006, 2007, 2008, 2009, 2010, 2011, 2012, 2013, 2014, 2015, 2016, 2017, 2018, 2019
- Men's golf (2): 2004, 2019
- Men's soccer (5): 2003, 2013, 2014, 2016, 2019
- Women's Rowing (5): 2006, 2007, 2008, 2017, 2019
- Women's soccer (17): 2000, 2001, 2002, 2003, 2005, 2006, 2007, 2008, 2009, 2010, 2011, 2012, 2015, 2016, 2017, 2018, 2019
- Softball (11): 2002, 2007, 2008, 2009, 2011, 2012, 2013, 2014, 2016, 2018, 2019
- Men's swimming and diving (19): 2001, 2002, 2003, 2004, 2005, 2006, 2007, 2008, 2009, 2010, 2011, 2012, 2013, 2014, 2015, 2016, 2017, 2018, 2019
- Women's swimming and diving (19): 2001, 2002, 2003, 2004, 2005, 2006, 2007, 2008, 2009, 2010, 2011, 2012, 2013, 2014, 2015, 2016, 2017, 2018, 2019
- Men's tennis (16): 2001, 2002, 2003, 2004, 2005, 2006, 2007, 2008, 2009, 2010, 2011, 2013, 2014, 2016, 2017, 2018
- Women's tennis (12): 2001, 2002, 2003, 2004, 2005, 2006, 2007, 2008, 2009, 2010, 2016, 2018
- Men's outdoor track and field (13): 2001, 2002, 2005, 2006, 2008, 2010, 2011, 2012, 2013, 2014, 2015, 2016, 2018
- Women's outdoor track and field (14): 2001, 2002, 2003, 2004, 2005, 2006, 2007, 2008, 2009, 2010, 2011, 2012, 2014, 2017
- Women's volleyball (15): 2000, 2001, 2002, 2003, 2004, 2006, 2007, 2008, 2009, 2010, 2011, 2012, 2013, 2015, 2019
- Men's water polo (16): 1989, 1991, 1992, 1993, 1995, 1998, 1999, 2000, 2002, 2006, 2011, 2013, 2014, 2015, 2018, 2019
- Women's water polo (8): 2011, 2013, 2014, 2015, 2016, 2017, 2018, 2019

Men's Rowing is not governed by the NCAA but instead by the Intercollegiate Rowing Association (IRA). The Tritons have represented the University at the IRA National Championships six times.

- Men's Rowing (6): 2009, 2011, 2013, 2017, 2018, 2019

=== Team ===
The Tritons of UC San Diego earned 3 NCAA championships at the Division II level.

- Women's (3)
  - Soccer (2): 2000, 2001
  - Softball (1): 2011

Results

School year	Sport	Opponent	Score
2000–01	Women's soccer	Northern Kentucky	2–1
2001–02	Women's soccer	Christian Brothers	2–0
2010–11	Softball	UAH	10–3

UC San Diego won 20 national championships at the NCAA Division III level.

- Men's golf: 1993
- Men's soccer: 1988, 1991, 1993
- Women's soccer: 1989, 1995, 1996, 1997, 1999
- Women's tennis: 1985, 1987, 1989
- Women's volleyball: 1981, 1984, 1986, 1987, 1988, 1990, 1997

Below are twenty-four national club team championships:

- Co-ed badminton (4): 2001, 2003, 2005, 2006 (ABA)
- Men's badminton (3): 2003, 2005, 2006 (ABA)
- Women's badminton (4): 2001, 2003, 2005, 2006 (ABA)
- Men's rugby – Division II (2): 1998, 1999 (USA Rugby)
- Co-ed surfing (7): 1970, 1983, 1990, 1993, 1995, 1997, 2003 (NCSA)
- Women's triathlon (2): 2008, 2009 (USA Triathlon)
- Women's ultimate (2): 2002, 2019 (USA Ultimate)
- Co-ed water skiing – Division II (1): 2004 (NCWSA)

Note: Those with no denoted division is assumed that the institution earned a national championship at the highest level.

=== Individual ===
UC San Diego had 47 Tritons win NCAA individual championships at the Division II level.

NCAA individual championships
Order	School year	Athlete(s)	Sport	Source
1	1992–93	Koren Pollock	Women's swimming and diving	
2	2000–01	Jennifer Watanbe; Sandra Lopez; Sarah Brainard; Samantha Wong	Women's swimming and diving	
3	2000–01	Sandra Lopez	Women's swimming and diving	
4	2000–01	Sandra Lopez	Women's swimming and diving	
5	2000–01	Jennifer Watanabe	Women's swimming and diving	
6	2000–01	Jennifer Watanabe	Women's swimming and diving	
7	2000–01	Jennifer Watanabe	Women's swimming and diving	
8	2002–03	Rosanna Delurgio	Women's swimming and diving	
9	2002–03	Rosanna Delurgio	Women's swimming and diving	
10	2003–04	Carolyn Kwok; Liz Whiteley; Rosanna Delurgio; Emily Harlan	Women's swimming and diving	
11	2003–04	Denise Bogard	Women's swimming and diving	
12	2003–04	Rosanna Delurgio	Women's swimming and diving	
13	2003–04	Rosanna Delurgio	Women's swimming and diving	
14	2004–05	Susan Bell; Rosanna Delurgio; Frances Tran; Emily Harlan	Women's swimming and diving	
15	2004–05	Kurt Boehm	Men's swimming and diving	
16	2004–05	Kurt Boehm	Men's swimming and diving	
17	2004–05	Kurt Boehm	Men's swimming and diving	
18	2004–05	Rosanna Delurgio	Women's swimming and diving	
19	2004–05	Rosanna Delurgio	Women's swimming and diving	
20	2005–06	Sophie Levy	Women's swimming and diving	
21	2006–07	Evan Hsiao	Men's swimming and diving	
22	2007–08	Kendall Bohn	Women's swimming and diving	
23	2007–08	Whitney Johnson	Women's outdoor track and field	
24	2007–08	Dan Perdew	Men's swimming and diving	
25	2007–08	Dan Perdew	Men's swimming and diving	
26	2007–08	Linda Rainwater	Women's outdoor track and field	
27	2008–09	Anju Shimura; Sadie O'Brien; Jessica Ferguson; Aubrey Paris	Women's swimming and diving	
28	2008–09	Kendall Bohn	Women's swimming and diving	
29	2008–09	Christine Merill	Women's outdoor track and field	
30	2008–09	Dan Perdew	Men's swimming and diving	
31	2008–09	Lisa Rainwater	Women's swimming and diving	
32	2008–09	Danielle Thu	Women's outdoor track and field	
33	2009–10	Alexandra Henley	Women's swimming and diving	
34	2009–10	Alexandra Henley	Women's swimming and diving	
35	2009–10	Nick Howe	Men's outdoor track and field	
36	2009–10	Dan Perdew	Men's swimming and diving	
37	2009–10	Dan Perdew	Men's swimming and diving	
38	2010–11	Alexandra Henley	Women's swimming and diving	
39	2010–11	Matthew Herman	Men's swimming and diving	
40	2010–11	Matthew Herman	Men's swimming and diving	
41	2010–11	Nick Howe	Men's outdoor track and field	
42	2010–11	Nicholas Korth	Men's swimming and diving	
43	2011–12	Emily Adamczyck	Women's swimming and diving	
44	2012–13	Anjali Shakya	Women's swimming and diving	
45	2012–13	Dane Stassi	Men's swimming and diving	
46	2013–14	Nicholas Korth	Men's swimming and diving	
47	2013–14	Anjali Shakya	Women's swimming and diving	
48	2019–20	Spencer Daily	Men's swimming and diving	

At the NCAA Division III level, UC San Diego won 84 individual championships.

== Traditions ==
=== Boosters ===
UC San Diego recognizes two external organizations of athletic boosters: the Triton Athletic Associates is a booster group of parents, alumni, and friends who have each donated between US$50 and $2,500; and the UC San Diego Athletic Board is made up of donors who have given US$10,000 or more to athletic programs. On campus, spirit and support groups consist of the UC San Diego Pep Band, Triton Tide (a student engagement group), the UC San Diego Cheerleaders, and the UC San Diego Dance Team. Further opportunities for athletic involvement are available to students interested in team staffing and management.

=== Mascot ===
King Triton appears as a costumed character mascot.
