= Vance Albitz =

American baseball player

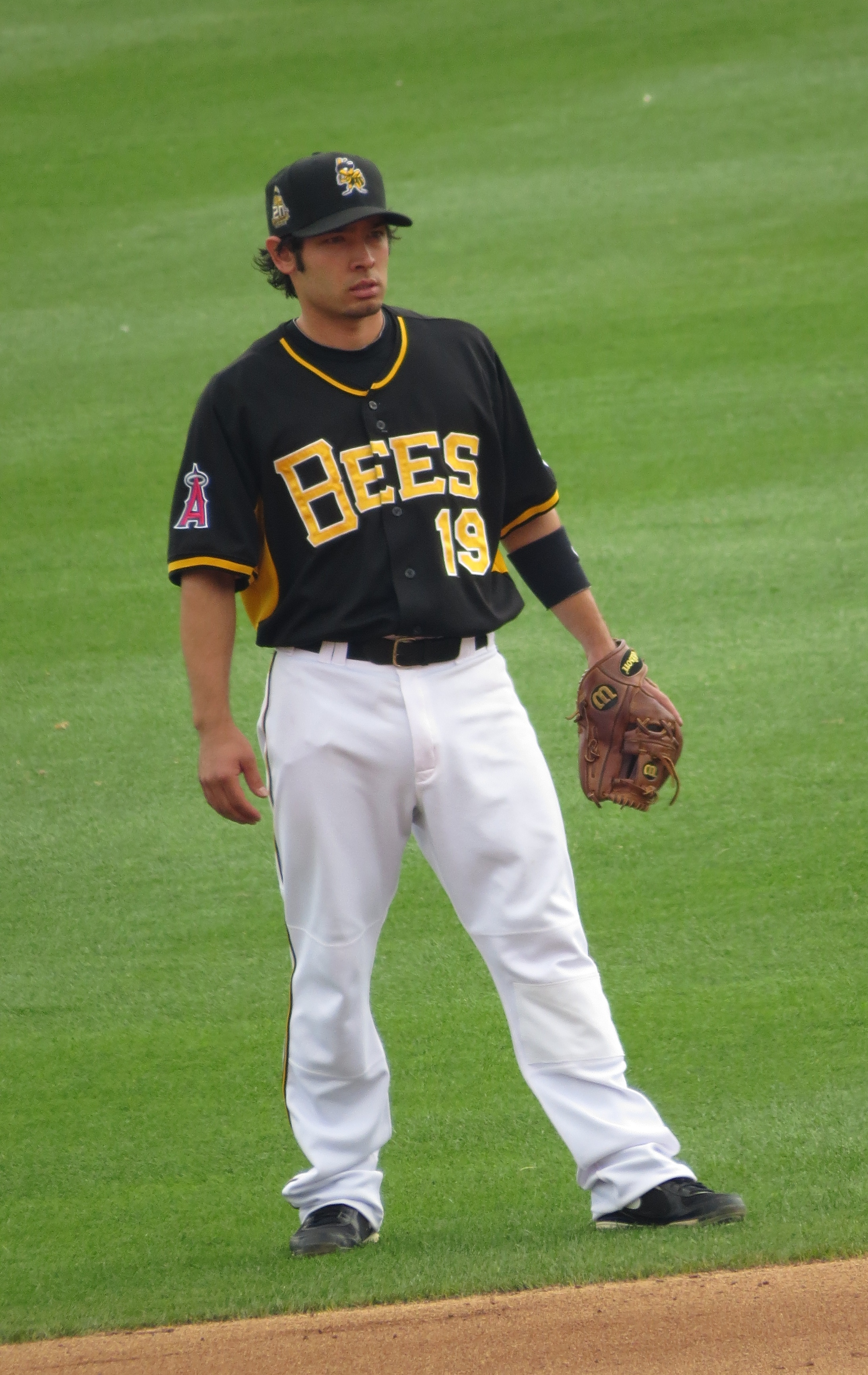
- Albitz with the Salt Lake Bees
- Infielder
- Born: January 31, 1988 (age 37); Torrance, California, U.S.
- Bats: Right Throws: Right

Vance Philip Albitz (born January 31, 1988) is an American former professional baseball infielder. He played college baseball for the UC San Diego Tritons and in Minor League Baseball for the St. Louis Cardinals and Los Angeles Angels organizations.

== Amateur career ==
=== High school ===
Albitz played baseball all four years at South High School in Torrance, California. He was a two-time all-state selection for baseball and a three-year letterman on the basketball team. Albitz was voted South High School's "Athlete of the Year" in 2005 and 2006.

=== College ===
At the University of California, San Diego in La Jolla, California, Albitz was a walk-on player for coach Dan O'Brien's UC San Diego baseball team in the fall of 2006; he later earned an athletic scholarship. A standout in the California Collegiate Athletic Association (CCAA), he was a first-team All-CCAA selection in 2007 and 2008, a first-team All-American in 2009 and 2010, a three-time Gold Glove winner at shortstop (2008–2010), and the first back-to-back two-time "National Defensive Player of the Year" in Triton baseball history. Albitz was a member of the 2009 Tritons squad that finished third in the Division II College World Series and the 2010 team that finished second.

== Professional career ==
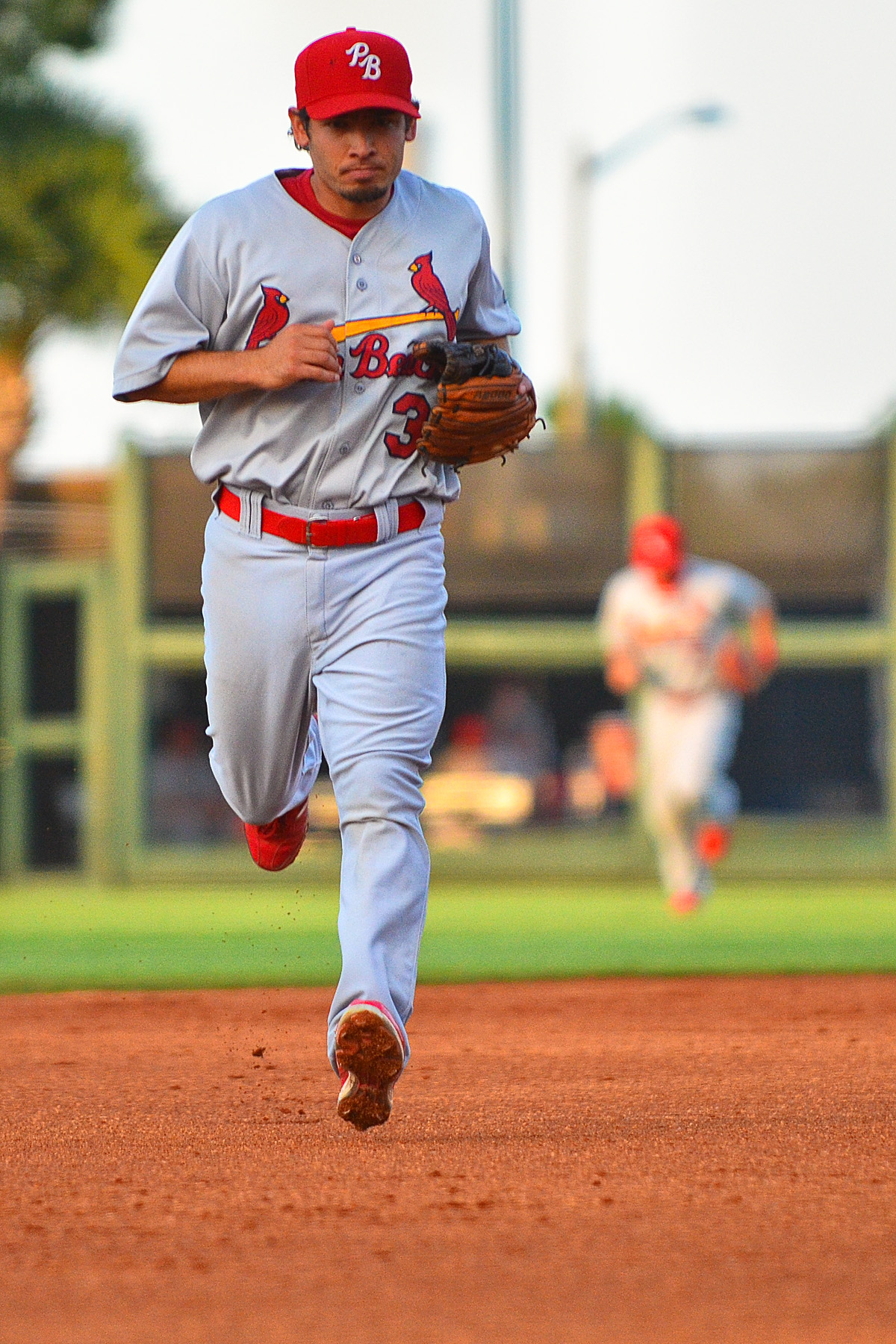
Albitz with the Palm Beach Cardinals

=== St. Louis Cardinals ===
Albitz's contract was sold by the Lincoln Saltdogs of the American Association of Professional Baseball to the St. Louis Cardinals on August 24, 2011. Albitz finished the final 13 games of the season in Batavia, NY for the Batavia Muckdogs where he hit .283 and committed just one error at shortstop. In 2012, Albitz began the year with the Palm Beach Cardinals of the Florida State League and progressed his way up to the AAA Memphis Redbirds, finishing the year as a member of the 2012 Texas League Champion Springfield Cardinals. In 2013, Albitz began and ended the year in AAA with the Memphis Redbirds. In 2014, Albitz was released by the Cardinals at the conclusion of Spring Training.

=== Los Angeles Angels ===
Albitz signed a free agent contract with the Angels in 2014. In 206 at-bats, Albitz hit .325 for the AAA Salt Lake City Bees of the Pacific Coast League and finished with a .990 fielding percentage. Before the start of the 2015 season, Albitz was released by the Angels.

== Personal life ==
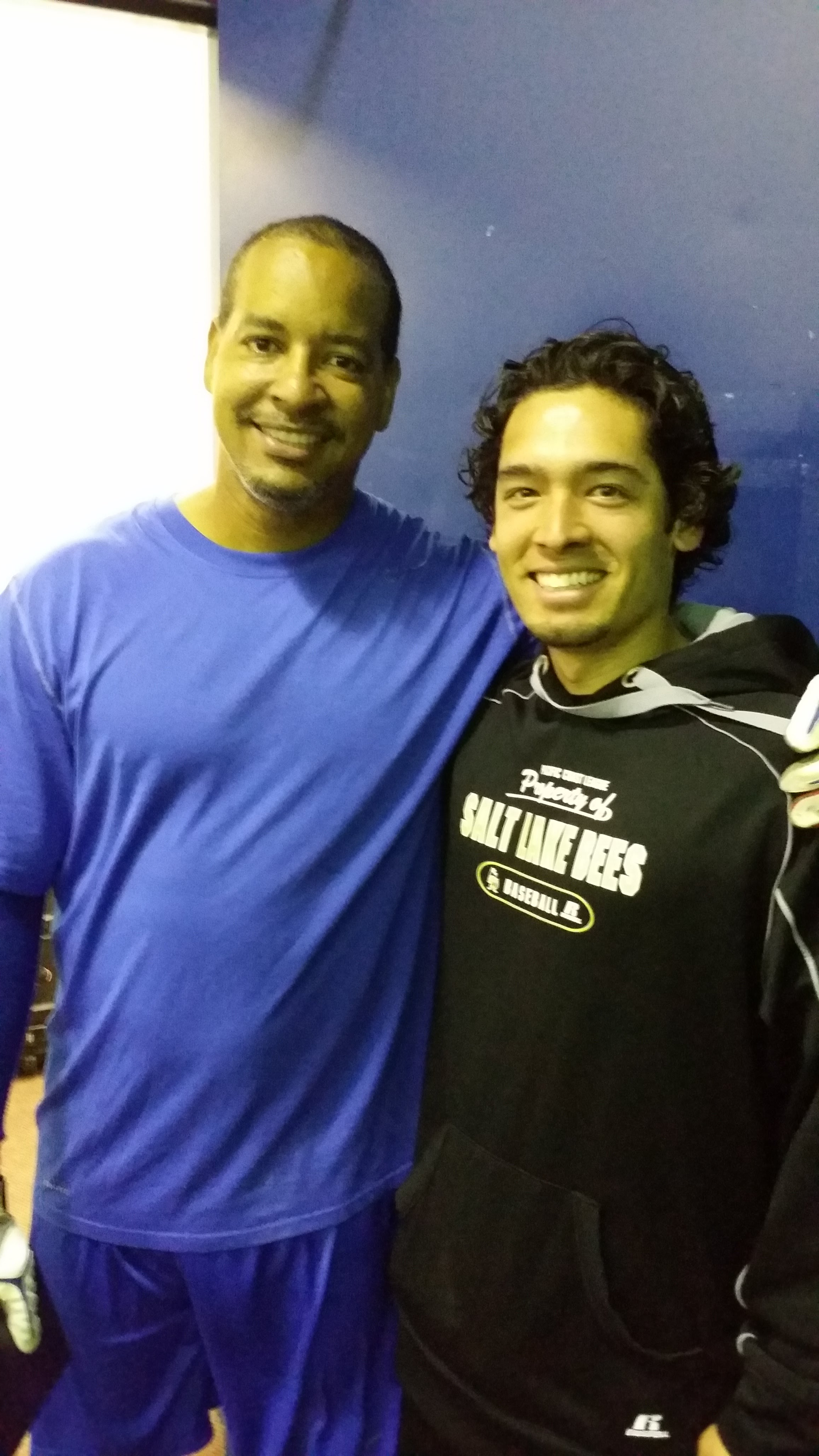
Albitz with Manny Ramirez (Iowa Cubs)

Albitz was born in Torrance, California to parents Phil and Velma, and brother Clete. Albitz made national news in 2012 when his charity, Gloves 4 Troops, was publicized by ESPN sports writer Rick Reilly. His foundation was given publicity on a number of different television programs, most notably Hot Stove on MLB Network and GameChangers on CBS. Since 2012, Albitz has sent over 3,124 baseball gloves to American soldiers stationed in more than 20 countries around the world. Albitz presently lives in Torrance, California with his wife and 3 children.
