= 2017 NCAA Division II baseball tournament =

- Season: 2017
- Teams: 56
- Finals site: AirHogs Stadium; Grand Prairie, Texas
- Champions: West Chester (2nd title)
- Runner-up: UC San Diego (3rd CWS Appearance)
- Winning coach: Jed Prachniak (2nd title)
- MOP: Josh McClain (West Chester)

The 2017 NCAA Division II baseball tournament was the 50th edition of the NCAA Division II baseball tournament. The 56-team tournament decided the champion of baseball in NCAA Division II for the 2017 season. The West Chester Golden Rams claimed their second national title, their first being in 2012. In the final, West Chester defeated the UC San Diego Tritons. The Tritons were also in their second final, having also been the national runners up in 2010. West Chester pitcher Josh McClain was named the tournament's most outstanding player.

== Regionals ==
=== Atlantic Regional–Jamestown, New York ===
Hosted by Mercyhurst at Russell Diethrick Park.

Upper round 1	Upper round 2	Upper final	Final
1	Mercyhurst	11
4	Millersville	4
4	Millersville	6
5	Shippensburg	0
1	Mercyhurst	4
2	West Chester	8
3	Seton Hill	3
6	Shepherd	10
6	Shepherd	4
2	West Chester	11
2	West Chester	5
7	Winston–Salem State	4
2	West Chester	12	—
7	Winston–Salem State	7	—
Lower round 1	Lower round 2	Lower round 3	Lower final
4	Millersville	8
3	Seton Hill	3	7	Winston–Salem State	10	1	Mercyhurst	1
7	Winston–Salem State	5	7	Winston–Salem State	9	7	Winston–Salem State	6
5	Shippensburg	8
5	Shippensburg	10
6	Shepherd	5

=== Central Regional–Emporia, Kansas ===
Hosted by Emporia State at Trusler Sports Complex.

Upper round 1	Upper round 2	Upper final	Final
1	Emporia State	10
8	Arkansas–Monticello	8
1	Emporia State	1
4	Lindenwood	12^{13}
4	Lindenwood	14
5	Southern Arkansas	7
4	Lindenwood	10
3	St. Cloud State	8
3	St. Cloud State	12
6	Missouri Western	0
3	St. Cloud State	9
2	Minnesota State	4
2	Minnesota State	4
7	Central Oklahoma	0	4	Lindenwood	8	—
7	Central Oklahoma	4	—
Lower round 1	Lower round 2	Lower round 3	Lower final
2	Minnesota State	6
8	Arkansas–Monticello	5	8	Arkansas–Monticello	5	3	St. Cloud State	8
5	Southern Arkansas	4	2	Minnesota State	2	7	Central Oklahoma	14
7	Central Oklahoma	3
1	Emporia State	5
6	Missouri Western	2	7	Central Oklahoma	6
7	Central Oklahoma	5

=== East Regional–Manchester, New Hampshire ===
Hosted by Southern New Hampshire at Gill Stadium.

Upper round 1	Upper round 2	Upper final	Final
1	Southern New Hampshire	15
4	LIU Post	3
4	LIU Post	4
5	Felician	2
1	Southern New Hampshire	1
3	St. Thomas Aquinas	13
3	St. Thomas Aquinas	8
6	Southern Connecticut	3
3	St. Thomas Aquinas	4
2	New Haven	1
2	New Haven	5
7	Dominican	2
3	St. Thomas Aquinas	13	—
1	Southern New Hampshire	2	—
Lower round 1	Lower round 2	Lower round 3	Lower final
4	LIU Post	9
6	Southern Connecticut	3	7	Dominican	5	1	Southern New Hampshire	8
7	Dominican	5	4	LIU Post	7	5	Felician	2
5	Felician	8^{11}
2	New Haven	1
5	Felician	7

=== Midwest Regional–Midland, Michigan ===
Hosted by Northwood at Gerace Stadium.

Upper round 1	Upper round 2	Upper final	Final
1	Northwood	10
8	Kentucky Wesleyan	2
1	Northwood	3
4	Drury	2
4	Drury	3
5	Bellarmine	2
1	Northwood	5
3	Quincy	3
3	Quincy	4
6	Wayne State	3
3	Quincy	9
7	Saint Joseph's (IN)	8
2	Southern Indiana	4
7	Saint Joseph's (IN)	5	1	Northwood	3	0
3	Quincy	4	2
Lower round 1	Lower round 2	Lower round 3	Lower final
7	Saint Joseph's (IN)	1
8	Kentucky Wesleyan	10	8	Kentucky Wesleyan	4	3	Quincy	8
5	Bellarmine	2	8	Kentucky Wesleyan	3	6	Wayne State	5
6	Wayne State	4
4	Drury	2
6	Wayne State	4	6	Wayne State	5
2	Southern Indiana	2

=== South Regional–Cleveland, Mississippi ===
Hosted by Delta State at Ferriss Field.

Upper round 1	Upper round 2	Upper final	Final
1	Delta State	9
4	Florida Southern	7
4	Florida Southern	6
5	Valdosta State	3
1	Delta State	4
3	Nova Southeastern	1
3	Nova Southeastern	20
6	West Alabama	5
3	Nova Southeastern	3
2	Tampa	1
2	Tampa	12
7	Miles	1
1	Delta State	6^{10}	—
6	West Alabama	4	—
Lower round 1	Lower round 2	Lower round 3	Lower final
4	Florida Southern	6
6	West Alabama	17	6	West Alabama	7	6	West Alabama	10
7	Miles	15	6	West Alabama	7	3	Nova Southeastern	9
2	Tampa	6
2	Tampa	14
5	Valdosta State	5

=== Southeast Regional–Mount Olive, North Carolina ===
Hosted by Mount Olive at Scarborough Field.

Upper round 1	Upper round 2	Upper final	Final
1	Mount Olive	4^{13}
5	UNC Pembroke	3
4	Catawba	2
5	UNC Pembroke	6
1	Mount Olive	6
2	North Georgia	13
3	USC Aiken	6
6	Georgia College	5
3	USC Aiken	2
2	North Georgia	6
2	North Georgia	4
7	Lincoln Memorial	1
2	North Georgia	5	—
4	Catawba	4	—
Lower round 1	Lower round 2	Lower round 3	Lower final
5	UNC Pembroke	6
6	Georgia College	6	7	Lincoln Memorial	11	1	Mount Olive	5
7	Lincoln Memorial	7	7	Lincoln Memorial	2	4	Catawba	6
4	Catawba	8
3	USC Aiken	4
4	Catawba	7

=== South Central Regional–San Angelo, Texas ===
Hosted by Angelo State at Foster Field.

First round
1	Angelo State	11
6	Arkansas–Fort Smith	6
3	West Texas A&M	1
4	Lubbock Christian	2
2	Colorado Mesa	11
5	St. Edward's	2

Second round
1	Angelo State	1
3	West Texas A&M	2
6	Arkansas–Fort Smith	15
5	St. Edward's	12
4	Lubbock Christian	2
2	Colorado Mesa	3
1	Angelo State	6
4	Lubbock Christian	1

Third round
3	West Texas A&M	1
6	Arkansas–Fort Smith	3
2	Colorado Mesa	4
1	Angelo State	0

Final
6	Arkansas–Fort Smith	1	—
2	Colorado Mesa	8	—

=== West Region–Azusa, California ===
Hosted by Azusa Pacific at Cougar Baseball Field.

First round
1	Cal State Chico	7
6	Cal Poly Pomona	8
3	Dixie State	2
4	UC San Diego	5
2	Azusa Pacific	3
5	California Baptist	1

Second round
6	Cal Poly Pomona	5
3	Dixie State	6
1	Cal State Chico	2
5	California Baptist	14
4	UC San Diego	4
2	Azusa Pacific	0
6	Cal Poly Pomona	1
2	Azusa Pacific	10

Third round
3	Dixie State	14
5	California Baptist	5
4	UC San Diego	11
2	Azusa Pacific	3

Final
3	Dixie State	6	—
4	UC San Diego	8	—

== College World Series ==
=== Participants ===
School	Conference	Record (conference)	Head coach	Previous CWS appearances	Best CWS finish
Colorado Mesa	RMAC	48–10 (32–4)	Chris Hanks	2 (last: 2014)	2nd
Delta State	Gulf South	44–11 (25–8)	Mike Kinnison	11 (last: 2012)	1st
Lindenwood	MAIAA	39–18 (24–11)	Doug Bletcher	0 (last: never)	none
North Georgia	Peach Belt	46–10 (19–5)	Tom Cantrell	0 (last: never)	none
Quincy	GLVC	37–21 (17–10)	Josh Rabe	0 (last: never)	none
St. Thomas Aquinas	ECC	42–15 (20–5)	Scott Muscat	1 (last: 2014)	7th
UC San Diego	CCAA	40–17 (24–13)	Eric Newman	2 (last: 2010)	2nd
West Chester	PSAC	40–11 (22–6)	Jad Prachniak	3 (last: 2012)	1st

=== Results ===
==== Bracket ====
All Games Played at AirHogs Stadium in Grand Prairie, Texas

First round
West Chester	9
North Georgia	4
Lindenwood	4
Delta State	0
North Georgia	0
Delta State	4
St. Thomas Aquinas	6
UC San Diego	5
Quincy	3
Colorado Mesa	10
UC San Diego	10
Quincy	8

Second round
West Chester	5
Lindenwood	2
Colorado Mesa	6
Delta State	2
St. Thomas Aquinas	3
Colorado Mesa	2
Lindenwood	6
UC San Diego	11

Semifinals
West Chester	1	—
Colorado Mesa	0	—
St. Thomas Aquinas	0	3
UC San Diego	10	7

Final
West Chester	5
UC San Diego	2

==== Game results ====
Date	Game	Winner	Score	Loser	Notes
May 27	Game 1	Lindenwood	4–1	Delta State	
May 27	Game 2	West Chester	9–4	North Georgia	
May 28	Game 3	Colorado Mesa	10–3	Quincy	
May 28	Game 4	St. Thomas Aquinas	6–5	UC San Diego	
May 29	Game 5	Delta State	4–0	North Georgia	North Georgia eliminated
May 29	Game 6	West Chester	5–2	Lindenwood	
May 30	Game 7	UC San Diego	10–6	Quincy	Quincy eliminated
May 30	Game 8	St. Thomas Aquinas	3–2	Colorado Mesa	
May 31	Game 9	Colorado Mesa	6–2	Delta State	Delta State eliminated
May 31	Game 10	UC San Diego	11–6	Lindenwood	Lindenwood eliminated
June 1	Game 11	UC San Diego	10–0	St. Thomas Aquinas	
June 1	Game 12	West Chester	1–0	Colorado Mesa	Colorado Mesa eliminated
June 3	Game 13	UC San Diego	7–3	St. Thomas Aquinas	St. Thomas Aquinas eliminated
June 4	Game 14	West Chester	5–2	UC San Diego	West Chester wins National Championship
