= 2019 NCAA Division II baseball tournament =

NCAA Division II Baseball Tampa champions (2019)

- Season: 2019
- Teams: 56
- Finals site: USA Baseball National Training Complex; Cary, North Carolina
- Champions: Tampa (8th title)
- Runner-up: (4th CWS Appearance)
- Winning coach: Joe Urso (5th title)
- MOP: Jacinto Arredondo (Tampa)

The 2019 NCAA Division II baseball tournament decided the champion of baseball at the NCAA Division II level for the 2019 season. the Tampa Spartans won their eighth national championship in program history by defeating the Colorado Mesa Mavericks, who were playing in their second national championship. Head Coach Joe Urso won his fifth national championship in his tenure at Tampa. This tournament also introduced a super regional round to the tournament as the eight regionals were instead split into sixteen. Following which, the regional champions would face off in a best-of-three super regional, the winners of the super regionals would then advance to the College World Series.

== Regionals ==
=== Atlantic Region ===
==== Millersville Regional ====
Hosted by Millersville at Bennett J. Cooper Park

Pos	Team	Pld	W	L	RF	RA	RD	PCT	Qualification	MER	BLO	MIL
1	Mercyhurst	2	2	0	11	8	+3	1.000	Advance to regional final	—	9–8 (Note: The game between Bloomsburg and Mercyhurst went to extra innings. Mercyhurst won 9–8 after 18 innings.)	2–0
2	Bloomsburg	2	1	1	10	10	0	.500	Advance to regional final	8–9	—	2–1
3	Millersville	2	0	2	1	4	−3	.000		0–2	1–2	—

Notes:

Championship
4	Bloomsburg	0	—
5	Mercyhurst	11	—

Regional Champion: Mercyhurst

==== West Chester Regional ====
Hosted by West Chester at Serpico Stadium

Pos	Team	Pld	W	L	RF	RA	RD	PCT	Qualification	CHA	GAN	WCH
1	Charleston	2	2	0	15	3	+12	1.000	Advance to regional final	—	12–2	3–1
2	Gannon	2	1	1	8	16	−8	.500	Advance to regional final	2–12	—	6–4
3	West Chester	2	0	2	5	9	−4	.000		1–3	4–6	—

Championship
4	Gannon	1	—
6	Charleston	6	—

Regional Champion Charleston

==== Atlantic Super Regional ====
Hosted by Mercyhurst at Mercyhurst Baseball Field

Super Regional
Charleston	10	5	4
Mercyhurst	2	6	14

=== Central Region ===
Super Regional hosted by Augustana at Ronken Field

Opening Round	Regional semifinal
1	Augustana (SD)	12
8	Oklahoma Baptist	10
1	Augustana (SD)	9
5	Arkansas–Monticello	4
4	Minnesota State	2
5	Arkansas–Monticello	13
Sioux Falls Regional, Hosted by Augustana at Ronken Field
8	Oklahoma Baptist	8
4	Minnesota State	5
5	Arkansas–Monticello	15
8	Oklahoma Baptist	17
3	Central Missouri	8
6	Missouri Southern State	1
3	Central Missouri	6
7	Central Oklahoma	1
2	St. Cloud State	3
7	Central Oklahoma	4
Warrensburg Regional, Hosted by Central Missouri at Crane Stadium
6	Missouri Southern State	9
2	St. Cloud State	10
7	Central Oklahoma	9
2	St. Cloud State	4

Regional final
1	Augustana (SD)	8	—
8	Oklahoma Baptist	6	—
3	Central Missouri	8	—
7	Central Oklahoma	5	—

Super Regional
1	Augustana	4	2	—
3	Central Missouri	6	5	—

=== East Region ===
Super Regional Hosted by Southern New Hampshire at Penmen Field

Opening Round	Regional semifinal
1	Adelphi	3
8	Franklin Pierce	4
8	Franklin Pierce	3
5	NYIT	9
4	Wilmington (DE)	7
5	NYIT	10
Garden City Regional Hosted by Adelphi at William J. Bonomo Memorial Field
1	Adelphi	5
4	Wilmington (DE)	14
8	Franklin Pierce	10
4	Wilmington (DE)	12
3	LIU Post	7
6	Felician	2
3	LIU Post	4
2	Southern New Hampshire	3
2	Southern New Hampshire	4
7	Assumption	3
Manchester Regional Hosted by Southern New Hampshire at Penmen Field
6	Felician	6
7	Assumption	5
2	Southern New Hampshire	8
6	Felician	0

Regional final
5	NYIT	6	—
4	Wilmington (DE)	3	—
3	LIU Post	2	1
2	Southern New Hampshire	8	4

Super Regional
5	NYIT	9	6	—
2	Southern New Hampshire	8	3	—

=== Midwest Region ===
Super Regional Hosted by Ashland at Donges Field

Opening Round	Regional semifinal
1	Ashland	10
8	Tiffin	17
8	Tiffin	8
5	Bellarmine	5
4	Northwood	6
5	Bellarmine	7
Kent Regional, hosted by Ashland at Schoonover Stadium
1	Ashland	6
4	Northwood	5
5	Bellarmine	7
1	Ashland	8
3	Wayne State	8
6	Quincy	6
3	Wayne State	5
2	UIS	6
2	UIS	5
7	Drury	4
Springfield Regional, hosted by UIS at Robin Roberts Stadium
6	Quincy	5
7	Drury	7
3	Wayne State	7
7	Drury	15

Regional final
8	Tiffin	6	5
1	Ashland	7	15
2	UIS	11	—
7	Drury	5	—

Super Regional
1	Ashland	7	4	8
2	UIS	4	8	7

=== South Region ===
Super Regional hosted by Tampa at University of Tampa Baseball Field

Round of 16	Quarterfinals
1	Tampa	18
8	Spring Hill	9
1	Tampa	9
4	West Florida	1
4	West Florida	5
5	Nova Southeastern	4
Tampa Regional, hosted by Tampa at University of Tampa Baseball Field
8	Spring Hill	3
5	Nova Southeastern	6
4	West Florida	3
5	Nova Southeastern	5
3	Eckerd	1
6	Valdosta State	6
6	Valdosta State
2	Delta State	6
2	Delta State	5
7	Embry–Riddle (FL)	1
Cleveland Regional, hosted by Delta State at Ferriss Field
3	Eckerd	10
7	Embry–Riddle	9
6	Valdosta State	8
3	Eckerd	7

Semifinals
1	Tampa	6^{12}	—
5	Nova Southeastern	5	—
2	Delta State	9	—
6	Valdosta State	6	—

Finals
1	Tampa	3^{11}	6	—
2	Delta State	1	3	—

=== Southeast Region ===
==== Tigerville Regional ====
Hosted by North Greenville at Ashmore Park

		North Greenville	Mount Olive	Lincoln Memorial
1	North Greenville		W 4–3	W 7–0
4	Mount Olive	L 3–4		L 2–3
5	Lincoln Memorial	L 0–7	W 3–2	

Championship
1	North Greenville	8	—
5	Lincoln Memorial	3	—

Regional Champion: North Greenville

==== Newberry Regional ====
Hosted by Newberry College at Smith Road Complex

		Newberry	Catawba	Young Harris
2	Newberry		L 0–7	L 1–5
3	Catawba	W 7–0		W 9–2
6	Young Harris	W 5–1	L 2–9	

Championship
3	Catawba	7	—
6	Young Harris	5	—

Regional Champion Catawba

==== Super Regional ====
Hosted by North Greenville at Ashmore Park

Team	1	2	3
Catawba	4	4^{14}	-
North Greenville	3	3	-

=== South Central Region ===
==== Grand Junction Regional ====
Hosted by Colorado Mesa at Suplizio Field

		Colorado Mesa	Colorado Mines	West Texas A&M
1	Colorado Mesa		W 6–3	W 13–10
4	Colorado Mines	L 3–6		W 5–4
5	West Texas A&M	L 10–13	L 4–5	

Championship
1	Colorado Mesa	11	—
4	Colorado Mines	1	—

Regional Champion: Colorado Mesa

==== San Angelo Regional ====
Hosted by Angelo State at Foster Field

		Angelo State	Lubbock Christian	Rogers State
2	Angelo State		W 6–1	L 8–9
3	Lubbock Christian	L 1–6		L 5–9
6	Rogers State	W 9–8	W 9–5	

Championship
2	Angelo State	13	19
6	Rogers State	6	10

Regional Champion Angelo State

==== Super Regional ====
Hosted by Angelo State at Foster Field

Team	1	2	3
Colorado Mesa	1	8	3
Angelo State	0	9	2

=== West Region ===
==== Azusa Regional ====
Hosted by Azusa Pacific at Cougar Baseball Field

		Azusa Pacific	Cal State Monterey Bay	Cal Poly Pomona
1	Azusa Pacific		W 4–3	W 15–3
4	Cal State Monterey Bay	L 3–15		L 4–11
5	Cal Poly Pomona	L 3–4	W 11–4	

Championship
1	Azusa Pacific	19	—
5	Cal Poly Pomona	2	—

Regional Champion: Azusa Pacific

==== San Diego Regional ====
Hosted by UC San Diego at Triton Ballpark

		UC San Diego	Point Loma Nazarene	Montana State Billings
2	UC San Diego		W 7–5	W 11–4
3	Point Loma Nazarene	L 4–11		W 10–2
6	Montana State Billings	L 5–7	L 2–10	

Championship
2	UC San Diego	7	7
3	Point Loma Nazarene	8	5

Regional Champion UC San Diego

==== Super Regional ====
Hosted by Azusa Pacific at Cougar Baseball Field

Team	1	2	3
UC San Diego	2	6	16
Azusa Pacific	13	5	5

== College World Series ==
=== Participants ===
School	Conference	Record (conference)	Head coach	Previous CWS appearances	Best CWS finish
Ashland	GLIAC	47–13 (17–7)	John Schaly	4 (last: 2008)	5th
Catawba	SAC	47–12 (17–7)	Jim Gantt	2 (last: 2015)	2nd
Central Missouri	MIAA	43–14 (24–9)	Kyle Crookes	17 (last: 2016)	1st
Colorado Mesa	RMAC	50–9 (29–7)	Chris Hanks	4 (last: 2017)	2nd
Mercyhurst	PSAC	34–14 (19–9)	Joe Spano	2 (last: 2018)	4th
NYIT	ECC	37–14 (21–7)	Frank Catalanotto	0 (last: never)	N/A
Tampa	SSC	41–14 (19–11)	Joe Urso	17 (last: 2015)	1st
UC San Diego	CCAA	40–14 (30–10)	Eric Newman	5 (last: 2018)	2nd

=== Results ===
==== Bracket ====
First round
Ashland	4
Central Missouri	9
Colorado Mesa	11
NYIT	4
Ashland	8
NYIT	3
Catawba	0
UC San Diego	5
Tampa	4
Mercyhurst	2
Catawba	5
Mercyhurst	8

Second round
Central Missouri	5
Colorado Mesa	6
Central Missouri	11
Ashland	3
UC San Diego	2
Tampa	7
UC San Diego	5
Mercyhurst	6

Semifinals
Colorado Mesa	5	1
Central Missouri	7	0
Tampa	12	—
Mercyhurst	0	—

Finals
Colorado Mesa	1
Tampa	3

==== Game results ====
Date	Game	Winner	Score	Loser	Notes
June 1	Game 1	Central Missouri	9–4	Ashland	
June 1	Game 2	Colorado Mesa	11–4	NYIT	
June 2	Game 3	UC San Diego	5–0	Catawba	
June 2	Game 4	Tampa	4–2	Mercyhurst	
June 3	Game 5	Ashland	8–3	NYIT	NYIT eliminated
June 3	Game 6	Colorado Mesa	6–5	Central Missouri	
June 4	Game 7	Mercyhurst	8–5	Catawba	Catawba eliminated
June 4	Game 8	Tampa	7–2	UC San Diego	
June 5	Game 9	Central Missouri	11–3	Ashland	Ashland eliminated
June 5	Game 10	Mercyhurst	6–5	UC San Diego	UC San Diego eliminated
June 6	Game 11	Central Missouri	7–5	Colorado Mesa	
June 6	Game 12	Colorado Mesa	1–0	Central Missouri	Central Missouri eliminated
June 6	Game 13	Tampa	12–0	Mercyhurst	Mercyhurst eliminated
June 8	Game 14	Tampa	3–1	Colorado Mesa	Tampa wins National Championship
