= Dan O'Brien (baseball coach) =

American baseball coach (born 1971)

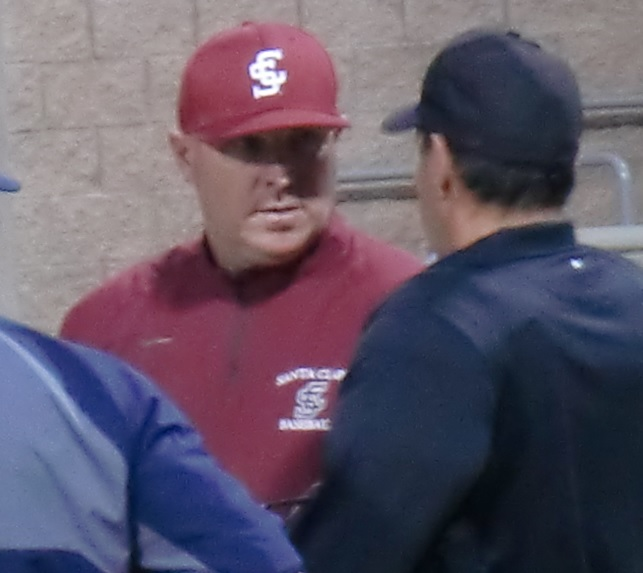
- O'Brien in 2016 at Stephen Schott Stadium.

Biographical details
- Born: 1971 (age 54–55)

Playing career
- 1993–1995: UC San Diego
- Position: First baseman/third baseman

Coaching career (HC unless noted)
- 1996–1997: UC San Diego (asst.)
- 1998–2011: UC San Diego
- 2012–2017: Santa Clara

Head coaching record
- Overall: 582–477–1 (.550)
- Tournaments: NCAA D-II: 11–9

Accomplishments and honors

Championships
- 4× CCAA Tournament (2005, 2009–11); 3× CCAA regular season (2009–11)

Daniel Peter O'Brien (born 1971) is an American baseball coach who currently works in the player development department of the San Francisco Giants organization. He was named to that position prior to the 2018 season. He previously coached Santa Clara University and the University of California, San Diego's baseball programs.

== Education and minor league playing career ==
O'Brien played at UC San Diego, led the team in home runs, continues to rank highly on several career lists. In his first year, he helped the team to a third-place finish in the NCAA Division III Baseball Championship. He then served as a player/coach for one season with the independent league team Greenville Bluesmen in 1996.

== Coaching career ==
In 1997, O'Brien became a full-time assistant at UC San Diego. After two years, he was elevated to the top job. After three seasons, the Tritons moved the program to Division II, joining the California Collegiate Athletic Association. O'Brien helped establish the Tritons as a strong program in the CCAA, leading them to the College World Series in consecutive years, finishing third and second in 2009 and 2010, respectively. He took over a struggling Santa Clara program in 2012, and has sought to rebuild it in his first two seasons.

On May 24, 2017, O'Brien resigned from Santa Clara.

== Administrative career ==
Since resigning from field coaching, he has operated TEN90 Coaching Group, a company that specializes in baseball talent development. In 2018, San Francisco Giants then-Director of Player Development David Bell hired O'Brien to the development staff of the Giants. He has since held the title of Development Coach for the Giants.

== Head coaching record ==
Record table
Season	Team	Overall	Conference	Standing	Postseason
UC San Diego Tritons (NCAA Division III independent) (1998–2000)
1998	UC San Diego	20–18			
1999	UC San Diego	19–18			
2000	UC San Diego	22–13			
UC San Diego (D-III):		61–49 (.555)			
UC San Diego Tritons (California Collegiate Athletic Association) (2001–2011)
2001	UC San Diego	14–34	7–28	11th	
2002	UC San Diego	30–23–1	23–17	5th	
2003	UC San Diego	25–28	19–19	T–6th	
2004	UC San Diego	35–24	22–18	5th	
2005	UC San Diego	37–20	23–17	2nd (North)	
2006	UC San Diego	35–24	23–13	2nd	
2007	UC San Diego	37–25	24–12	4th	NCAA D-II Regionals
2008	UC San Diego	43–18	25–11	2nd	NCAA D-II Regionals
2009	UC San Diego	41–15	27–9	1st	NCAA D-II Fourth Place
2010	UC San Diego	54–8	35–5	1st	NCAA D-II Runner-Up
2011	UC San Diego	42–15	29–11	1st	NCAA D-II Regionals
UC San Diego (D-II):		393–234–1 (.627)	257–160 (.616)		
UC San Diego (total):		454–283–1 (.616)	257–160 (.616)		
Santa Clara Broncos (West Coast Conference) (2012–2017)
2012	Santa Clara	26–28	5–19	9th	
2013	Santa Clara	14–39	1–23	9th	
2014	Santa Clara	26–30	16–11	4th	
2015	Santa Clara	26–28	12–15	7th	
2016	Santa Clara	23–29	10–17	9th	
2017	Santa Clara	13–40	9–18	7th	
Santa Clara:		128–194 (.398)	53–103 (.340)		
Total:		582–477–1 (.550)			
National champion Postseason invitational champion Conference regular season champion Conference regular season and conference tournament champion Division regular season champion Division regular season and conference tournament champion Conference tournament champion

== See also ==
- List of current NCAA Division I baseball coaches
