= UC San Diego Tritons baseball =

UC San Diego's baseball team

- 2026 UC San Diego Tritons baseball team
- Founded: 1969; 57 years ago
- Overall record: 931–682–10 (.577)
- University: University of California, San Diego
- Head coach: Eric Newman (15th season)
- Conference: Big West
- Location: La Jolla, California
- Home stadium: Triton Ballpark (capacity: 1,200)
- Nickname: Tritons
- Colors: Blue and gold

College World Series runner-up
- Division II: 2010, 2017

College World Series appearances
- Division II: 2009, 2010, 2017, 2018, 2019; Division III: 1987, 1994

NCAA tournament appearances
- Division II: 2002, 2005, 2007, 2008, 2009, 2010, 2011, 2012, 2014, 2015, 2017, 2018, 2019; Division III: 1986, 1987, 1989, 1992, 1994

Conference tournament champions
- 2005, 2009, 2010, 2011, 2012, 2014, 2018

Conference regular season champions
- Division I: 2023; Division II: 2009, 2010, 2011, 2012, 2019

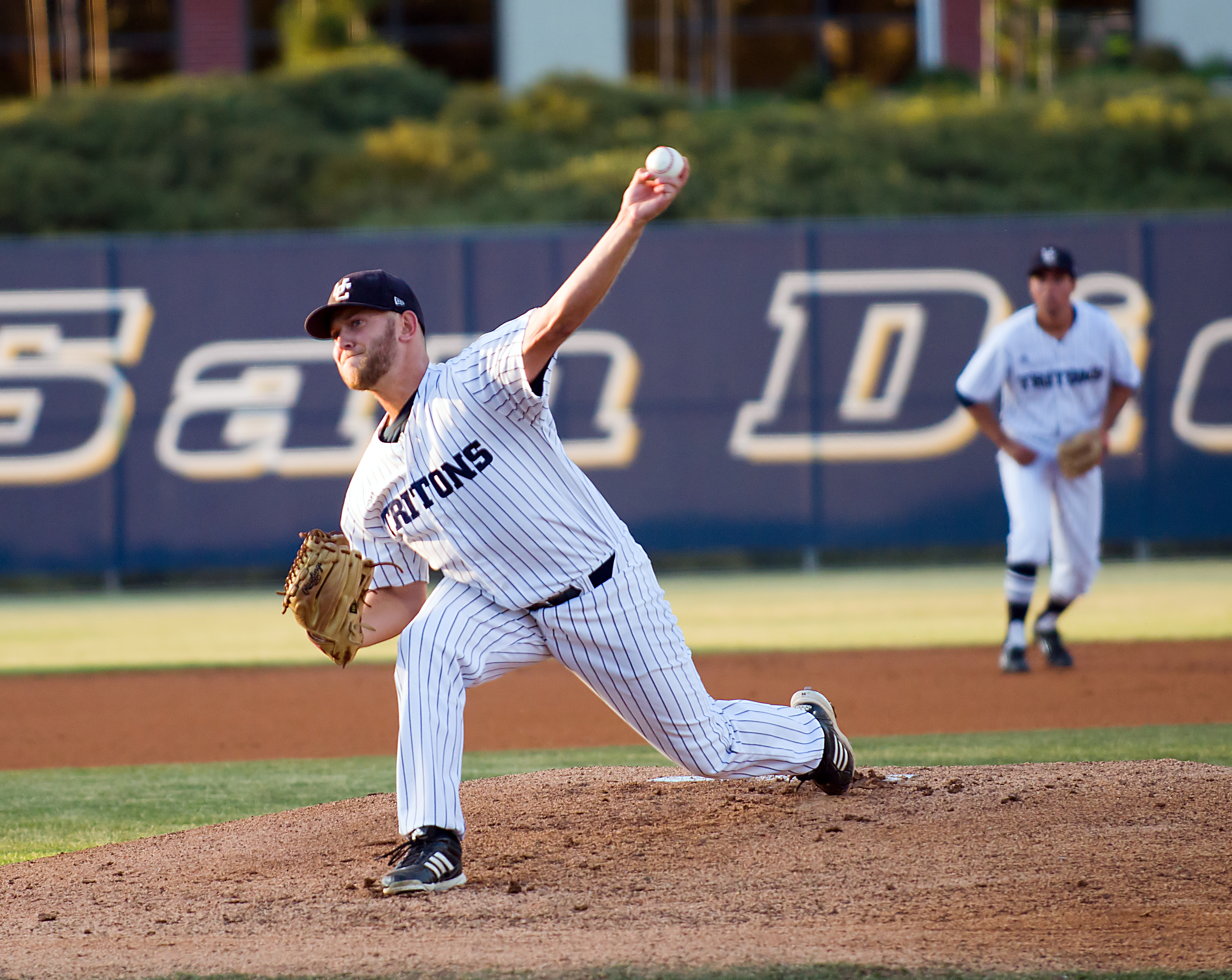
Tritons pitcher Trevor Scott delivers a pitch in a 2014 NCAA West Regional game

For information on all UC San Diego sports, see UC San Diego Tritons

The UC San Diego Tritons baseball team is the college baseball program that represents the University of California, San Diego. The Tritons compete in NCAA Division I as a member of the Big West Conference (BWC). The team plays its home games at Triton Ballpark.

== History ==
The Tritons have made several appearances in the Division II tournament, mostly under the leadership of former head coach Dan O'Brien. The Tritons reached the Division II College World Series for the first time in 2009, finishing fourth. In 2010, the Tritons enjoyed their most successful season to date, compiling a record of 54–8, and reaching the Division II national championship where they eventually fell.

The UC San Diego baseball team plays its home games at Triton Ballpark in La Jolla, which was renovated in 2014. In 2005, the Tritons were the CCAA league champions. In 2007 and 2008, they reached the NCAA West Regionals. In 2009, after winning the CCAA league and CCAA tournament, they advanced to the NCAA Division II College World Series under the leadership of coach Dan O'Brien and infielder Vance Albitz, where they placed fourth. In 2010, they were the College World Series runners-up and the CCAA league and tournament champions. In 2011 and 2012, they repeated as CCAA league and tournament champions, again reaching the NCAA West Regionals. They won the CCAA tournament in 2014 as well. In 2017, they were CCAA tournament runners-up and NCAA West Region champions, and placed second in the College World Series.

Triton baseball, like most UCSD athletic programs, transitioned to the NCAA Division I Big West Conference beginning in 2020.

== Yearly Records ==
Record table
Season	Coach	Overall	Postseason		
Vince Askey (D-III Ind.) (1980–1981)
1980	Vince Askey	13–22			
1981	Vince Askey	7–19			
Vince Askey:		20–41 (0.328)			
Lyle Yates (D-III Ind.) (1982–1994)
1982	Lyle Yates	9–17			
1983	Lyle Yates	8–26			
1984	Lyle Yates	10–18–1			
1985	Lyle Yates	23–28–1			
1986	Lyle Yates	22–16–2	NCAA Regional		
1987	Lyle Yates	32–13	DIII College World Series		
1988	Lyle Yates	23–12			
1989	Lyle Yates	23–19	NCAA Regional		
1990	Lyle Yates	19–18–2			
1991	Lyle Yates	16–23			
1992	Lyle Yates	28–9–1	NCAA Regional		
1993	Lyle Yates	16–19–1			
1994	Lyle Yates	33–8	DIII College World Series		
Lyle Yates:		262–226–8 (0.528)			
Robert Fletcher (D-III Ind.) (1995–1997)
1995	Robert Fletcher	23–13			
1996	Robert Fletcher	15–20–1			
1997	Robert Fletcher	19–17			
Robert Fletcher:		57–50–1 (0.528)			
Dan O'Brien (D-III Ind.) (1998–2000)
1998	Dan O'Brien	20–18			
1999	Dan O'Brien	19–18			
2000	Dan O'Brien	22–13			
Dan O'Brien (D-III):		61–49 (0.555)			
Division III (total):		400–366–9 (0.516)			
Dan O'Brien (D-II CCAA) (2001–2011)
2001	Dan O'Brien	14–34	7-28	11th	CCAA Tournament
2002	Dan O'Brien	30–23–1	23-17	5th	NCAA West Regional
2003	Dan O'Brien	25–28	19-19	T-6th	CCAA Tournament
2004	Dan O'Brien	35–24	22-18	5th	CCAA Tournament
2005	Dan O'Brien	37–20	23-17	3rd	NCAA West Regional
2006	Dan O'Brien	35–24	23-13	2nd	CCAA Tournament
2007	Dan O'Brien	37–25	24-12	4th	NCAA West Regional
2008	Dan O'Brien	43–18	NCAA West Regional		
2009	Dan O'Brien	41–15	27-9	1st	College World Series
2010	Dan O'Brien	54–8	35-5	1st	National Runners-Up
2011	Dan O'Brien	42–15	29-11	1st	NCAA West Regional
Dan O'Brien (D-II):		393–234–1 (0.625)	257-160-0 (0.616)		
Dan O'Brien (total):		454–283–1 (0.615)	257-160-0 (0.616)		
Eric Newman (D-II CCAA) (2012–2020)
2012	Eric Newman	33–24	26-14	T-1st	NCAA West Regional
2013	Eric Newman	26–24	20-20	T-6th	CCAA Tournament
2014	Eric Newman	38–16	26-10	3rd	NCAA West Regional
2015	Eric Newman	36–21	27-13	T-2nd	NCAA West Regional
2016	Eric Newman	31–21	20-17	2nd (South)	CCAA Tournament
2017	Eric Newman	44–19	24-13	2nd (South)	National Runners-Up
2018	Eric Newman	43–17	30-14	T-1st	2018 NCAA Division II baseball tournament
2019	Eric Newman	41–16	30-10	1st	2019 NCAA Division II baseball tournament
2020	Eric Newman	17-4	12-4	n/a	n/a
Eric Newman (D-I Big West) (2021–present)
2021	Eric Newman	24-28	21-17	4th	
2022	Eric Newman	24-32	13-17	8th	
2023	Eric Newman	34-18	21-9	1st	not eligible
2024	Eric Newman	30-23	17-13	5th	
Eric Newman:		391–230 (0.630)			
Division II (total):		763–445–1 (0.632)	257–160 (0.616)		
Division I (total):		82–78–0 (0.513)	55–43 (0.561)		
Total:		1,066–737–10 (0.581)			
National champion Postseason invitational champion Conference regular season champion Conference regular season and conference tournament champion Division regular season champion Division regular season and conference tournament champion Conference tournament champion

== Notable alumni ==
- Kyle Abbott, Los Angeles Angels of Anaheim, Philadelphia Phillies
- Vance Albitz, St. Louis Cardinals
- Alex Cremidan, Arizona Diamondbacks
- Guido Knudson, Detroit Tigers
- Alon Leichman, Olympian, member of the Israel national baseball team, and pitching coach for the Colorado Rockies
- Randy Miller, Baltimore Orioles, Montreal Expos
- Dillon Moyer, Los Angeles Dodgers
- Bob Natal, Montreal Expos, Florida Marlins
- Tony York, Chicago Cubs
- Shay Whitcomb, Houston Astros
- Jack Larsen, Seattle Mariners
