= Eric Newman (baseball) =

American baseball coach and player (born 1972)

Current position
- Title: Head coach
- Team: UC San Diego
- Conference: Big West
- Record: 447–288

Biographical details
- Born: August 27, 1972 (age 53); Lake Forest, Illinois, U.S.

Playing career
- 1992–1993: Fresno State
- 1994: Texas Tech
- 1995: Idaho Falls Braves
- 1995–1996: Clinton LumberKings
- 1997: Rancho Cucamonga Quakes
- 1998: Mobile BayBears
- 1999: West Tenn Diamond Jaxx
- 2000: Iowa Cubs
- 2001: Acereros de Monclova
- 2001–2002: Sonoma County Crushers
- 2001: El Paso Diablos
- 2002: Vero Beach Dodgers
- 2002: Solano Steelheads
- Position: Pitcher

Coaching career (HC unless noted)
- 2003–2004: Dallas Baptist (AHC/P)
- 2005–2007: Dallas Baptist
- 2008–2011: Nebraska (P)
- 2012–present: UC San Diego

Head coaching record
- Overall: 542–360
- Tournaments: NCAA DI: 0–0; NCAA DII: 18–13

Accomplishments and honors

Championships
- 3× CCAA (2012, 2018, 2019); 2× CCAA Tournament (2017, 2018); Big West (2023)

Awards
- 2× CCAA Coach of the Year (2012, 2019); Big West Coach of the Year (2023)

Eric Christian Newman (born August 27, 1972) is an American baseball coach and former pitcher. He is the head baseball coach of the UC San Diego Tritons. Newman played college baseball at Fresno State before transferring to Texas Tech in 1994 and in Minor League Baseball (MiLB) for seven seasons from 1995 to 2002. He then served as the head coach of the Dallas Baptist Patriots (2005–2007). He is the older brother of Andy Newman.

== Coaching career ==
Newman began to coach following the conclusion of his playing career. He joined the Dallas Baptist Patriots, under head coach Mike Bard as the team's pitching coach. During Newman's second season with the team, the ascended to NCAA Division I. In the fall of 2004, Newman was elevated to head coach of the Patriots. Newman lead the Patriots to a 95–72 record in his three years as head coach. On July 2, 2007, Newman was named the pitching coach of the Nebraska Cornhuskers. On August 17, 2011, Newman was named the pitching coach at Cal State Northridge. Just 12 days later, Newman was named the head baseball coach of the UC San Diego Tritons.

== Head coaching record ==
Statistics overview
Season	Team	Overall	Conference	Standing	Postseason
Dallas Baptist Patriots (Independent) (2005–2007)
2005	Dallas Baptist	32–23			
2006	Dallas Baptist	33–23			
2007	Dallas Baptist	30–26			
Dallas Baptist:		95–72			
UC San Diego Tritons (California Collegiate Athletic Association) (2012–2020)
2012	UC San Diego	33–24	26–14	T-1st	NCAA West Regional
2013	UC San Diego	26–24	20–20	T-6th	
2014	UC San Diego	38–16	26–10	3rd	NCAA West Regional
2015	UC San Diego	36–21	27–13	T-2nd	NCAA West Regional
2016	UC San Diego	31–21	20–17	2nd (South)	CCAA Tournament
2017	UC San Diego	44–19	24–13	2nd (South)	College World Series runner-up
2018	UC San Diego	43–17	30–14	T-1st	College World Series
2019	UC San Diego	41–16	30–10	1st	College World Series
2020	UC San Diego	17–4	12–4		Season canceled due to COVID-19
UC San Diego:			215–115		
UC San Diego Tritons (Big West Conference) (2021–present)
2021	UC San Diego	24–28	21–19	T-4th	
2022	UC San Diego	24–32	13–17	8th	
2023	UC San Diego	34-18	21-9	1st	
2024	UC San Diego	30-23	17-13	5th	
2025	UC San Diego	26-25	15-15	6th	
UC San Diego:		447–288	87–73		
Total:		542–360			
National champion Postseason invitational champion Conference regular season champion Conference regular season and conference tournament champion Division regular season champion Division regular season and conference tournament champion Conference tournament champion

== See also ==
- List of current NCAA Division I baseball coaches
