= Jack Larsen =

Jack Larsen may refer to:

- Jack Larsen (baseball)
- Jack Larsen (politician)
- Jack Lenor Larsen, American textile designer, author and collector

== See also ==
- Jack Larson, American actor, librettist, screenwriter and producer
- John Larsen (disambiguation)
