= Changing the Game =

Changing the Game may refer to:

- Changing the Game (album), a 1999 album by Infamous Syndicate
- Changing the Game (film), a 2012 dramatic film
- Changing the Game (2019 film), a 2019 Hulu documentary
- Changin' the Game, a 1997 album by Luke
- "Change the Game", a 2001 song by Jay-Z
