= Southern Indiana Screaming Eagles baseball =

Baseball team in Evansville, Indiana, U.S.

- 2026 Southern Indiana Screaming Eagles baseball team
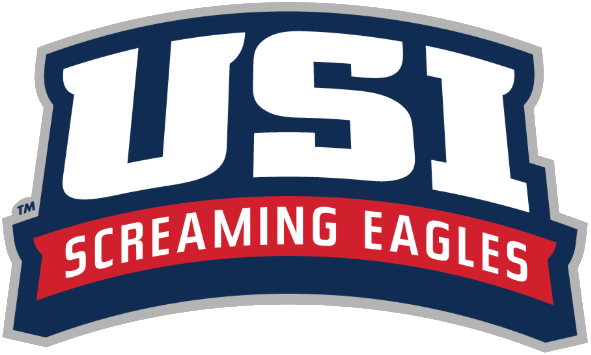
- Founded: 1971; 55 years ago
- Overall record: 1188–959 (.553)
- University: University of Southern Indiana
- Head coach: Chris Ramirez (2nd season)
- Conference: Ohio Valley
- Location: Evansville, Indiana, U.S.
- Home stadium: USI Baseball Field (capacity: 500)
- Nickname: Screaming Eagles
- Colors: Blue, white, and red

College World Series champions
- Division II: 2010, 2014

College World Series appearances
- Division II: 2007, 2010, 2014, 2016, 2018

NCAA tournament appearances
- Division II: 1979, 1983, 1989, 1992, 1993, 1994, 2007, 2009, 2010, 2011, 2014, 2016, 2018

Conference tournament champions
- 1983, 1985, 1993, 2010

Conference regular season champions
- 1992, 1993, 2008, 2009, 2010, 2011, 2014, 2016

The Southern Indiana Screaming Eagles baseball program represents the University of Southern Indiana in the NCAA's Division I level. They have won the Division II Tournament national championship twice. The Screaming Eagles play their home games at USI Baseball Field and are coached by Chris Ramirez.

== History ==
Southern Indiana won NCAA Division II baseball championships in both 2010 and 2014. It also reached the Division II College World Series in 2007, 2016, and 2018. The program won four Great Lakes Valley Conference (GLVC) tournament championships, in 1983, 1985, 1993, and 2010, along with eight GLVC regular-season championships.

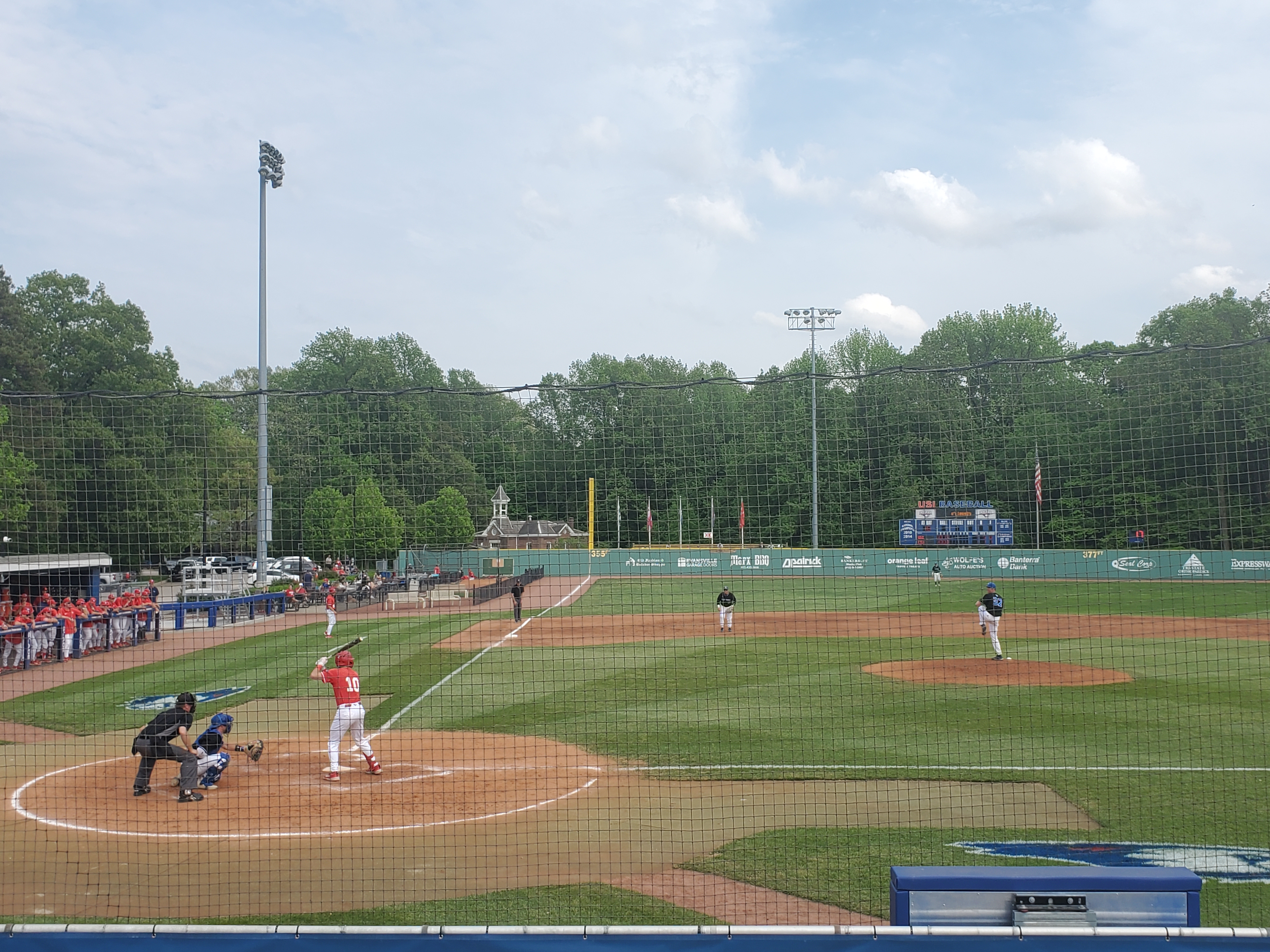
USI Baseball Field in 2024

The program transitioned to NCAA Division I beginning with the 2023 season. In their first DI season, the Eagles went 17-38 and finished 8th in the Ohio Valley Conference, qualifying for the conference tournament by a half game over Lindenwood. The Eagles were eliminated in the OVC play-in round by a 5-4 loss to Eastern Illinois, who went on to win the OVC championship.

== Facility ==
The Screaming Eagles play at the 600 seat USI Baseball Field on the south side of the university's campus. The facility also has a patio section for spectators with picnic tables along the third base line.

USI hosted the 2012, 2013, and 2014 GLVC baseball tournaments, with games played at both USI Baseball Field and Evansville's larger Bosse Field.

== Major League Baseball ==
Southern Indiana has had 7 Major League Baseball draft selections since the draft began in 1965.

Screaming Eagles in the Major League Baseball Draft

Year	Player	Round	Team
1994	Kevin Brown	2	Rangers
1995	Todd Niemeier	36	Mariners
2007	Darin Mastroianni	16	Blue Jays
2008	Jeremy Kehrt	47	Red Sox
2011	Taylor Dennis	34	Rangers
2017	Justin Watts	37	Blue Jays
2018	Logan Brown	35	Braves

== See also ==
- Southern Indiana Screaming Eagles
