= Natasha Regan =

English chess player (born 1971)

Personal information
- Born: Natasha Katherine Regan; 12 June 1971 (age 55) London, England

Chess career
- Country: England
- Title: Woman International Master (2002)
- Peak rating: 2208 (July 2004)

Natasha Katherine Regan is an English chess player and an award-winning chess author, best known for her book Game Changer. She has represented England at two Chess Olympiads. As a senior (50+), she won the Women's English Seniors Chess Championship in both 2023 and in 2024.

Regan is also a successful games all-rounder having won multiple medals at the Mind Sports Olympiad including back-to-back Women's Pentamind in 2023 and 2024.

She is also an accomplished Go player. Partnering with Matthew Cocke, she has won the British pair Go championship seven times and has taken bronze at the European Pair Go Championship. Natasha has represented the UK at Go at the first World Mind Sports Games in Beijing 2008 and again in 2012.

== Personal life ==
Natasha studied mathematics at King's College, Cambridge University and is a professional actuary with twin daughters and a son, Oscar Selby. She taught Oscar math, leading him to become the youngest person ever to obtain the grade of A*, the maximum grade for a GCSE, in 2010 for Mathematics.

== Chess ==
While at Cambridge University she became the first female player to play above Board 8 (formerly known as the ladies' board) in the 1992 Oxford and Cambridge Varsity Chess Match. Natasha represented England at the 1992 Chess Olympiad in Manilla and the 1994 Chess Olympiad in Moscow. Natasha was awarded the FIDE rank of Woman International Master in 2002. In September 2019, she was elected to the Board of the English Chess Federation (ECF).

== Books ==
Natasha has co-authored two chess books alongside English chess Grandmaster Matthew Sadler. Their first collaboration Chess For Life won ECF book of the year. It interviews and details the way several notable chess players' styles and games evolved throughout their chess careers. Her collaboration with Matt Ball, Zwischenzug! about intermediate moves in chess was nominated for the 2024 ECF book of the year.

=== Game Changer ===
Natasha Regan came up with the idea for her and GM Matthew Sadler's second collaboration Game Changer which won the FIDE chess book of the year. It details the lessons that can be learnt from how DeepMind's revolutionary computer program AlphaZero plays chess.

The book has been influential upon competitive chess. At the Tata Steel Chess Tournament 2019, after a draw with Teimour Radjabov, number 1 ranked chess player and world champion, Magnus Carlsen commented about Game Changer: "I found the book quite inspirational. I was thinking at several points during the game: How would AlphaZero have approached this?"

== Bibliography ==
- Regan, Natasha; Lalic, Susan (1997). Trends in the Smith-Morra Gambit. Tournament Chess. ISBN 978-1859320730.
- Regan, Natasha; Lalic, Susan (1998). Trends in the Bird's Opening. Trends Publications. ISBN 978-1859320372.
- Sadler, Matthew; Regan, Natasha (2016). Chess For Life. Gambit. ISBN 978-1910093832.
- Sadler, Matthew; Regan, Natasha (2019). Game Changer. New In Chess. ISBN 978-9056918187.
- Regan, Natasha; Ball, Matt (2024). Zwischenzug!. Chessable. ISBN 978-9083413921.
