= Game Changer (soundtrack) =

2025 soundtrack album by Thaman S

- Soundtrack album cover

Soundtrack album by Thaman S
- Released: 4 January 2025
- Recorded: 2021–2024
- Studios: Prasad Film Labs, Hyderabad; Studio Uno Records, Chennai; YRF Studios, Mumbai; Studio28, Bangkok; New Edge Studios, Mumbai
- Genre: Film soundtrack
- Length: 29:44
- Language: Telugu
- Label: Saregama
- Producer: Thaman S

Thaman S chronology
Baby John (2024)	Game Changer (2025)	Daaku Maharaaj (2025)

Singles from Game Changer
- 1. "Jaragandi" Released: 27 March 2024; 2. "Raa Macha Macha" Released: 30 September 2024; 3. "NaaNaa Hyraanaa" Released: 28 November 2024; 4. "Dhop" Released: 22 December 2024

Jukebox
- Game Changer – Jukebox on YouTube

Game Changer is the soundtrack album composed by Thaman S to the 2025 Indian Telugu-language action drama film of the same name directed by S. Shankar and starring Ram Charan. The film marked Thaman's first collaboration with Shankar, and its soundtrack featured seven songs with lyrics written by Ramajogayya Sastry, Anantha Sriram, Kasarla Shyam and Roll Rida. The soundtrack was released under the Saregama label on 4 January 2025.

== Background and development ==
When the project was announced under the tentative title RC15, (Note: Ram Charan's 15th film as a leading actor) it was initially speculated that Anirudh Ravichander would compose music for the film after he previously associated with Shankar on Indian 2 (2024). Later, on that March, Shankar's norm collaborator A. R. Rahman was also considered to score music for the film. This was also speculated, when Rahman replied to a fan through X (formerly Twitter), anticipating his return to Telugu cinema. In July 2021, it was announced that Thaman S would compose the music for the film.

The film is Thaman's first collaboration, with Shankar and third collaboration with Charan after Naayak (2013) and Bruce Lee: The Fighter (2015). Shankar has been in touch with Thaman, ever since the latter's acting debut with his directorial Boys (2003). Speaking to Sangeetha Devi Dundoo of The Hindu, Thaman recalled "Rahman sir told me on April 1, last year, that Shankar sir wants me to compose for his new film; I thought it was a joke." However, the producer Dil Raju called Thaman to meet Shankar at his residence on Chennai; Thaman who was re-recording the score for Vakeel Saab (2021) eventually met Shankar who asked him to compose a tune for the film. After finishing the tune, Shankar eventually impressed with it and confirmed his part in the film. Shankar's insistence on Thaman being involved in the project, was attributed to his liking on Thaman's compositions on Ala Vaikunthapurramuloo (2020).

== Production ==
Game Changer's soundtrack featured around eight songs. Thaman composed three songs each at specific intervals on March, April and July 2021 during the COVID-19 pandemic. The latter, being an introductory song which was recorded on 14–15 July 2021 in Hyderabad, with the help of 135 musicians. By April 2022, he had composed around five songs for the film, which he called it as the fastest music composition for any of his films. As he designed the album exclusively for Shankar, Thaman had to change the sonic treatment of his music, making it different from his previous films. While composing "NaaNaa Hyraanaa", he came up with a unique programming technique that can produce different sounds with a lot of monotones. On 19 September 2024, Thaman took to X (formerly Twitter) that the recording of the film's background score would commence from 1 October 2024.

== Music videos ==
The songs were choreographed by Jani Master, Prabhu Deva, Ganesh Acharya, Bosco Martis and Prem Rakshith. According to producer Dil Raju, around ₹90 crore (US$9.3 million) had been invested on filming the songs. However, it was later revealed that the final amount for filming the songs were ₹75 crore (US$7.8 million).

The song "Jaragandi" was reportedly made on a budget of ₹15–20 (US$1.8–24 million) becoming one of the most-expensive songs ever produced. It featured Charan and Advani, and over 600 dancers with choreography by Deva. The song was shot for 8 days at a specially erected 70-feet hill-village set at Ramoji Film City in Hyderabad. The lead pair and the dancers worn eco-friendly costumes made from jute designed by the duo Ashwin–Rajesh.

The song "Raa Macha Macha", under Acharya's choreography, was shot at various locations in and around Visakhapatnam which includes: Gandhi Institute of Technology and Management, Simhachalam Hill Range and RK Beach. Described as a tribute to Indian dance forms and folklore from various regions, the song featured more than 1000 folk dancers. In an interaction with Thaman, Shankar revealed that Charan had danced for an entire piece of the song's bit in a single shot. Charan also recreated Chiranjeevi's veena step from the song "Dayi Dayi Damma" featured in Indra (2002).

"NaaNaa Hyraanaa" which featured the lead pair under Martis' choreography was filmed at New Zealand which costed ₹15 crore (US$1.6 million). Cinematographer Tirru shot the song using infrared camera, which has ability to bring out various colours. The song was not included in the initial release due to the technical difficulties in processing the infrared images to the theatrical version. Though, the producers ensured that the song would be included in the theatrical cut by 14 January, the song was eventually added to theatres within two days.

The song "Dhop" was filmed at the Ramoji Film City, which was picturized on the lead pair and with choreography by Jani, featured around 100 dancers from Russia.

== Marketing and release ==
The audio rights for the film were acquired by Saregama. Prior to its release, the song "Jaragandi" was leaked online on 16 September 2023, which led to the arrest of two individuals for leaking the footage and prompting the makers to take action against such incidents. On the occasion of Dusshera (23 October 2023), it was announced that the song would be released as a single on Diwali (12 November 2023). But, the song was postponed indefinitely, a day prior to its release. The delay was attributed to audio documentation issues, as the leaked version of the song received negative response prompting Thaman to change the singers. The leaked version initially had vocals by Anurag Kulkarni and Sunidhi Chauhan, before Daler Mehndi replaced Kulkarni's vocals in the Telugu version. It was released on 27 March 2024, on the occasion of Charan's 39th birthday.

On the occasion of Ganesh Chaturthi (7 September 2024), the makers released a poster indicating that the second single from the film will be released later this month. On 25 September, the song's title was revealed as "Raa Macha Macha", and the promo was released on 28 September. Two three-minute videos titled Sounds of Game Changer—an interaction between Shankar and Thaman, and Raju and lyricist Anantha Sriram, describing the making of the song—was released. The full song was then released on 30 September 2024. Its release coincided with a launch event held at St. Martin's Engineering College in Hyderabad with Shankar, Raju, Thaman, Sriram, S. J. Suryah and Srikanth in attendance.

On 23 November, the third single was announced. A romantic number pictured on Charan and Advani, it was titled "Naa Naa Hyraanaa" and promoted with two behind-the-scenes interaction videos: one with Shankar and Thaman, and the other, regarding the making of the song with the singers Karthik and Shreya Ghoshal. The song was officially released on 28 November, in three languages. The fourth song was announced on 18 December, being titled as "Dhop" and was launched at the pre-release event held in Dallas, Texas on 21 December at 9:00 p.m. CST, and in India on 22 December at 8:30 a.m. IST.

The remaining songs—"Arugu Meedha", "Konda Devara" and "Koparap"— were released with the soundtrack album on 4 January 2025. Later, the song "Unpredictable", which featured vocals by Blaaze, and lyrics written by Blaaze and Adviteeya Vojjala was released as an additional track on 9 January 2025.

== Track listing ==
Telugu
No.	Title	Lyrics	Singer(s)	Length
1.	"Jaragandi"	Anantha Sriram	Daler Mehndi, Sunidhi Chauhan	4:20
2.	"Raa Macha Macha"	Anantha Sriram	Nakash Aziz	4:32
3.	"NaaNaa Hyraanaa"	Ramajogayya Sastry	Karthik, Shreya Ghoshal	4:34
4.	"Dhop"	Ramajogayya Sastry	Thaman S, Roshini, Prudhvi Chandra, Sruthi Ranjani Modumudi	4:51
5.	"Arugu Meedha"	Kasarla Shyam	Thaman S, Roshini	5:46
6.	"Konda Devara"	Kasarla Shyam	Thaman S, Sravana Bhargavi	2:55
7.	"Koparap"	Roll Rida	Thaman S, Roll Rida	2:44
Total length:				29:44

Extended soundtrack
No.	Title	Lyrics	Singer(s)	Length
8.	"Unpredictable"	Blaaze, Adviteeya Vojjala	Thaman S, Blaaze	2:54
9.	"Jaragandi – Version 2"	Anantha Sriram	Sri Krishna, Sahiti Chaganti	4:20
Total length:				32:38

Tamil
No.	Title	Lyrics	Singer(s)	Length
1.	"Raa Macha Macha"	Vivek	Nakash Aziz	4:32
2.	"Lyraanaa"	Vivek	Karthik, Shreya Ghoshal	4:34
3.	"Dhop"	Vivek	Aditi Shankar, Prudhvi Chandra, Sruthi Ranjani Modumudi	4:51
4.	"Jaragandi"	Vivek	Daler Mehndi, Pooja Venkat	4:20
5.	"Varusanaatu"	Yugabharathi	Thaman S, Roshini	4:39
6.	"Konda Devara"	Yugabharathi	Thaman S, Sindhuja Srinivasan	2:21
7.	"Koparap"	Arivu	Thaman S, SOK	2:08

Hindi
No.	Title	Lyrics	Singer(s)	Length
1.	"Jaragandi"	Kumaar	Daler Mehndi, Sahithi Chaganti	4:20
2.	"Dam Tu Dikhaja"	Kumaar	Nakash Aziz	4:32
3.	"Jaana Hairaan Sa"	Kausar Munir	Karthik, Shreya Ghoshal	4:34
4.	"Dhop"	Raqueeb Alam	Raja Kumari, Prudhvi Chandra, Shruthi Ranjani Modumudi	4:51
5.	"Aaj Poocha"	Swanand Kirkire	Thaman S, Adviteeya Vojjala	4:39
6.	"Tu Hi Davatha"	Swanand Kirkire	Thaman S, Sravana Bhargavi	2:21
7.	"Koparap"	Raqueeb Alam	Thaman S, MC Hari	2:08

== Background score ==
Game Changer

Film score by Thaman S
- Released: 2 February 2025
- Recorded: 2021–2024
- Genre: Film score
- Length: 33:20
- Language: Telugu
- Label: Saregama
- Producer: Thaman S

No.	Title	Length
1.	"The Raid"	1:22
2.	"Ram's Comeback"	1:38
3.	"Ram Nandan's Love"	1:23
4.	"Love Dhop"	3:20
5.	"Mopidevi"	3:04
6.	"The Return Of Parvathy"	1:59
7.	"CM Ram Nandan"	1:58
8.	"The Soul Of Appanna – Part 1"	2:00
9.	"The Soul Of Appanna – Part 2"	2:22
10.	"The Soul Of Appanna – Part 3"	1:29
11.	"The Attack"	1:47
12.	"Truth Of Appanna"	2:31
13.	"The Sacrifice"	1:18
14.	"The Conflict"	1:55
15.	"The Unpredictable Rap Verse"	2:23
16.	"The Hope"	2:44
Total length:		33:20

== Reception ==
Avinash Ramachandran of The Indian Express mentioned Thaman as one of "the striking aspects" of the film where he ensures that "there is never a moment where we are not invested in the proceedings". Paul Nicodemus of The Times of India mentioned that "Thaman's musical score elevates the film, with a soundtrack that compliments its themes" and also described "Jaragandi" as one of the highlights in terms of picturization. Sashidhar Adivi of Times Now wrote "Thaman's score elevates the cinematic experience complementing the visual brilliance achieved by the technical team." Arjun Menon of Rediff.com wrote "Thaman's songs have a experimental, percussion-based folk sounding to it that adds some flavour." Balakrishna Ganeshan of The News Minute added that Thaman's "high-octane music amplify the style and narrative".

Sangeetha Devi Dundoo of The Hindu added that "Thaman's music and the background score are in tandem with the mood of the narrative" but felt that the songs did not stand out despite the grandeur and picturization. Janani K. of India Today wrote "While the songs, composed by S Thaman, are mounted in eyebrow-raising set pieces, they hardly make you feel wow, like they did in the 90s. The songs hardly made any impact or were worth humming." Deepa Gahlot of Scroll.in stated "The songs are instantly forgettable. The loud, insistent background score could wake up the dead on the next planet."
