= GameChangers =

Russian education program on IT business

- Established: 2010
- Location: St. Petersburg, Russia
- Website: http://gamechangers.ru

Game|Changers — program for ad hoc education and research on IT business. Participation is free, but the number of participants is limited to 20 persons. The program is aimed on the highly motivated students and recent graduates of technical and non-technical universities who desire to investigate the IT industry and contribute with the best they can to the cause.

Game|Changers consists of: classes with experts and key persons from IT industry, Universities, marketing and management fields; intensive networking; project based work; internships in leading IT companies, business incubators and venture funds. Lectures and master classes are important, but the emphasis is on learning through discussions, case studies and individual and group research projects as well as reading. Students are expected to show proactive approach to learning. Main languages are Russian and English.

== Goals ==
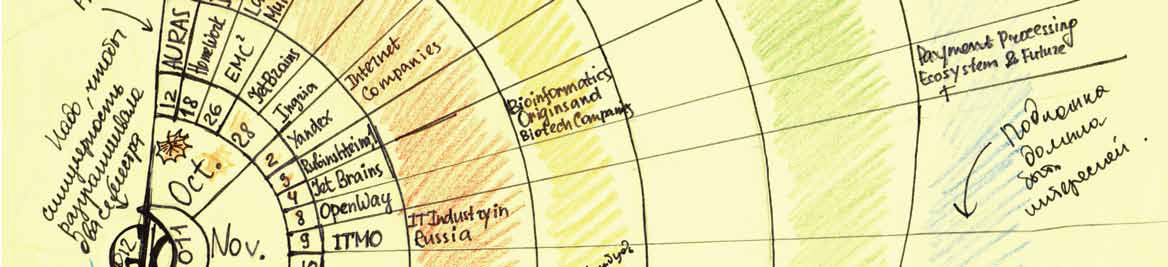

The program was created to train professionals in corporate innovation, technology transfer, scientific and applied research management, education and entrepreneurship. It also aimed to develop a cross-community network of professionals familiar with the information technology industry and Russia’s innovation ecosystem.

== Program structure ==
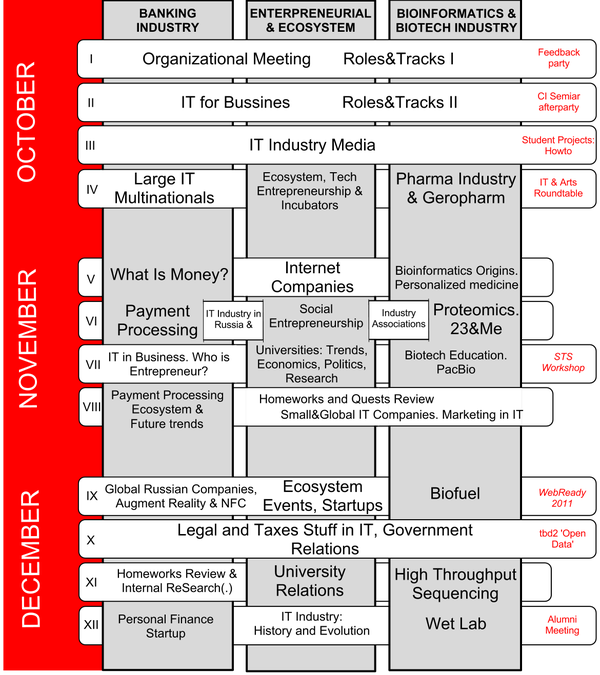

The program runs in St.Petersburg within four semesters with a few visits to Moscow, Finland, co-working abroad. Semester I is a theoretical one and consists of weekly classes, homework and research tasks. Semester II is devoted to special tracks, minimum two of which are being chosen by student. Semester III and IV are allocated for graduate projects. Participation for students requires about 4–8 study hours and 8–16 homework hours weekly.

== See also ==
- Singularity University
