= Triton Ballpark =

Ballpark in San Diego, California

Coordinates: 32.881309°N 117.226225°W

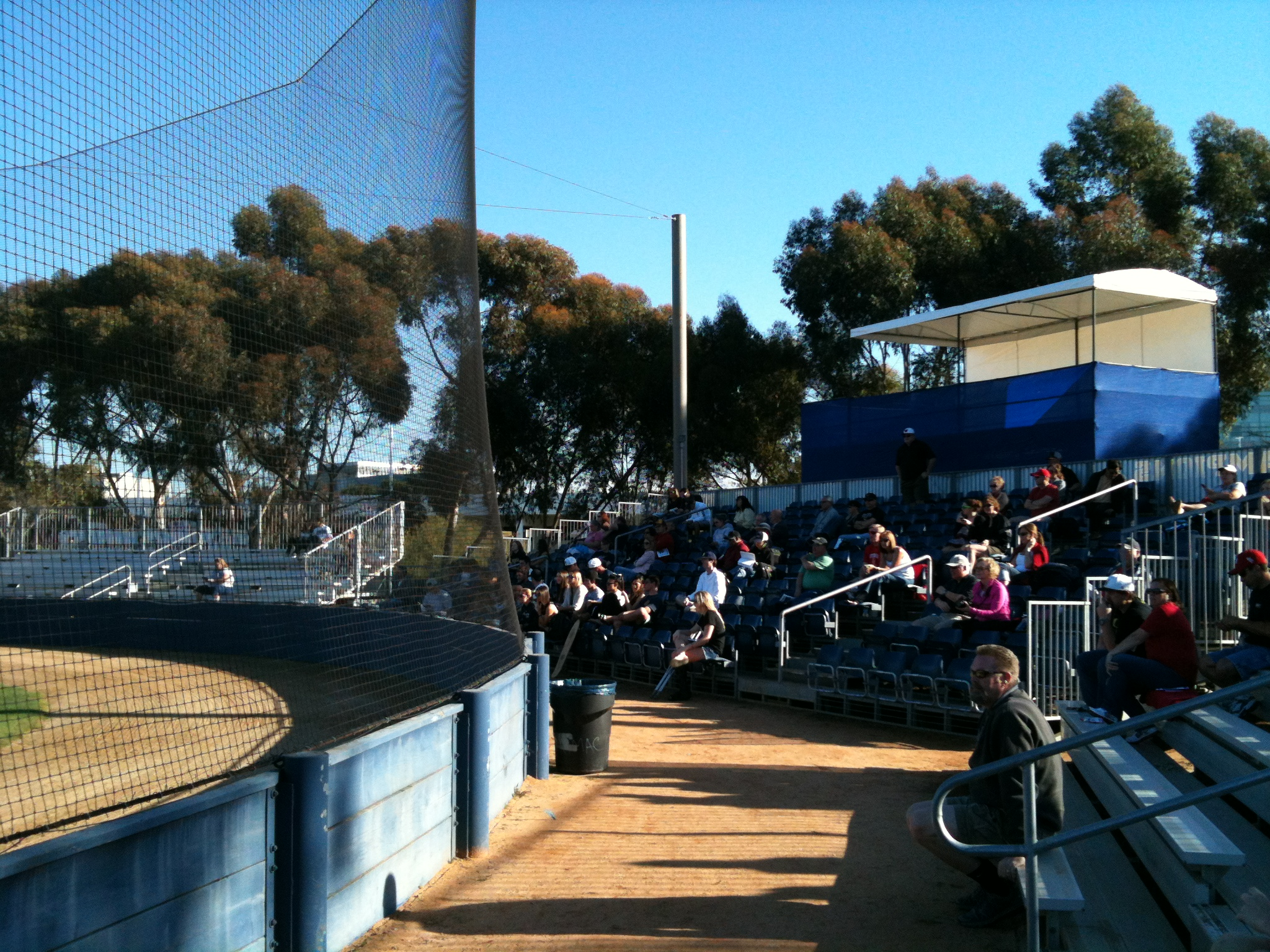
- Interactive map of Triton Ballpark
- Address: 3432 Voigt Drive; La Jolla, California; United States
- Owner: UC San Diego
- Operator: UC San Diego
- Capacity: 500
- Surface: Grass
- Field size: Left Field - 330 ft Center Field - 400 ft Right Field - 330 ft

Tenants
- UC San Diego Tritons (NCAA) (2000–present)

Website
- ucsdtritons.com/triton-ballpark

Triton Ballpark is a ballpark in San Diego, California, located on the campus of the University of California, San Diego. It is the home of the UC San Diego Tritons baseball team. The Tritons compete in NCAA Division I as a member of the Big West Conference (BWC).

== History and features ==
The stadium was upgraded in 2011 to include lights, allowing the first-ever night game to be played at the venue on January 29, 2011. A scoreboard was added in 2013. The ballpark underwent a significant renovation prior to the 2015 season.

The $6.89 million renovation added a permanent grandstand to replace bleacher seating, restrooms, sunken dugouts, a press box, and a players' clubhouse down the right field line. The clubhouse, named for former UCSD chancellor Marye Anne Fox, includes locker rooms, offices, showers, laundry facilities, a Hall of Fame and a players' lounge.

The official Triton Ballpark re-opening and clubhouse dedication took place on April 10, 2015.

The Tritons' most recent league championship was won in 2014.

== See also ==
- List of NCAA Division I baseball venues
