= Wartburg Knights baseball =

American college baseball program in Waverly, Iowa

- Founded: 1958; 68 years ago
- Head coach: Casey Klunder (3rd season)
- Conference: ARC
- Location: Waverly, Iowa
- Home stadium: Harms Stadium at Hertel Field (capacity: 500)
- Nickname: Knights
- Colors: Orange and Black

College World Series appearances
- 1964, 2000, 2005

NCAA tournament appearances
- 1997, 1998, 1999, 2000, 2001, 2002, 2003, 2005, 2008, 2009, 2013, 2015, 2016, 2017, 2026

Conference tournament champions
- 1998, 1999, 2000, 2001, 2003, 2005, 2008, 2009, 2013, 2017, 2026

Conference regular season champions
- 1961, 1962, 1963, 1977, 1978, 1979, 1997, 1998, 1999, 2000, 2001, 2002, 2003, 2004, 2005, 2006, 2007, 2008, 2013, 2015, 2016, 2017

The Wartburg Knights baseball program represents Wartburg College in college baseball. The program started in 1958. The team competes in the NCAA Division III and a member of the American Rivers Conference (ARC). The team plays its home games at Harms Stadium at Hertel field in Waverly, Iowa.

== History ==
The Wartburg Knights baseball team played its first season in 1958, with its first game coming against Iowa Wesleyan. The Knights reached the NAIA World Series in 1964. They hold the record for longest game played when they beat West Liberty State in a 16 inning game. The program rose to national relevance in the late 1990s, early 2000s when Joel Holst was hired in 1996. The program has won a conference leading 22 conference championships, the most recent coming 2017 when they won three straight IIAC titles.

=== Joel Holst era (1997-2022) ===
Joel Holst was hired in 1995 and coached his first season at Wartburg in 1996. In his first season they finished with a .500 record at 20-20. Following that season the Knights would go on to win 12 straight conference regular season championships and appeared in the college world series on two occasions (2000, 2005). During the 2005 College World Series the Knights played in two games that set records; the first was the longest game in series history in terms of innings, when they defeated Rowan College in 16 innings 8–6 and then played in the shortest game in series history when they lost to SUNY Cortland 5–0 in 1 hour and 52 minutes. Joel Holst resigned from his head coaching position prior to the 2023 season. Following his resignation, Casey Chaplin was named interim head coach for the 2023 baseball season.

=== Casey Klunder era (2024-Present) ===
Following the 2023 season, Casey Klunder, was tabbed as the fifth head coach in program history. He began his tenure at Wartburg with a 12–4 win over Grove City, with a 3–0 start to the year. In just his third season, Klunder returned the Knights back to the NCAA tournament after a nine year hiatus. They would go on to win 28 games which was also the most since their 2017 season.

== Record by year ==
This is a table of the Wartburg Knights record year-by-year.

Record table
| Season | Coach | Overall | Conference | Standing | Postseason |
|---|---|---|---|---|---|
Wartburg (Iowa Intercollegiate Athletic Conference) (1958–2017)
| 1958 | Earnest Oppermann | 11–7 | 7–5 | | |
| 1959 | Earnest Oppermann | 9–8 | 8–6 | | |
| 1960 | Earnest Oppermann | 7–5 | 6–4 | | |
| 1961 | Earnest Oppermann | 14–6 | 14–3 | 1st | |
| 1962 | Earnest Oppermann | 10–6 | 10–2 | 1st | |
| 1963 | Earnest Oppermann | 13–6 | 8–4 | 1st | NAIA Regional |
| 1964 | Earnest Oppermann | 18–6 | 9–3 | 2nd | NAIA World Series |
| 1965 | Earnest Oppermann | 3–8 | | | |
| 1966 | Earnest Oppermann | 12–8 | | | |
| 1967 | Earnest Oppermann | 15–5 | | | |
| 1968 | Earnest Oppermann | 12–8 | | | |
| 1969 | Earnest Oppermann | 11–9 | | | |
| 1970 | Earnest Oppermann | 12–17 | | | |
| 1971 | Earnest Oppermann | 11–19 | | | |
| 1972 | Earnest Oppermann | 7–7 | | | |
| 1973 | Earnest Oppermann | 9–14 | | | |
| 1974 | Earnest Oppermann | 7–18 | 5–8 | | |
| 1975 | Earnest Oppermann | 13–14 | 6–0 | | |
| 1976 | Earnest Oppermann | 16–16 | 8–2 | | |
| 1977 | Earnest Oppermann | 12–20 | 10–2 | 1st | |
| 1978 | Earnest Oppermann | 16–20 | 9–3 | 1st | |
| 1979 | Earnest Oppermann | 14–11 | 11–1 | 1st | |
| 1980 | Earnest Oppermann | 9–23 | 6–6 | | |
| 1981 | Earnest Oppermann | 17–21 | 10–4 | | |
| 1982 | Earnest Oppermann | 13–19 | 7–3 | | |
| 1983 | John Kurtt | 10–22 | 6–6 | | |
| 1984 | John Kurtt | 11–16 | 9–9 | | |
| 1985 | John Kurtt | 12–15 | 10–10 | | |
| 1986 | John Kurtt | 16–22 | 14–8 | | |
| 1987 | John Kurtt | 15–20 | 11–7 | | |
| 1988 | John Kurtt | 16–20 | | | |
| 1989 | John Kurtt | 14–22–1 | 10–7–1 | | |
| 1990 | John Kurtt | 12–19 | 10–10 | | |
| 1991 | John Kurtt | 10–22 | 8–8 | | |
| 1992 | John Kurtt | 9–25 | 6–15 | | |
| 1993 | John Kurtt | 4–16 | 2–8 | | |
| 1994 | Randy Moore | 17–14 | 8–8 | 5th | |
| 1995 | Randy Moore | 12–21 | 5–14 | 7th | |
| 1996 | Joel Holst | 20–20–1 | 7–9 | 4th | |
| 1997 | Joel Holst | 30–16 | 16–4 | 1st | NCAA Regional |
| 1998 | Joel Holst | 40–10 | 20–4 | 1st | NCAA Regional |
| 1999 | Joel Holst | 33–13–1 | 17–6 | 1st | NCAA Regional |
| 2000 | Joel Holst | 41–9 | 22–2 | 1st | College World Series |
| 2001 | Joel Holst | 37–9–1 | 20–2 | 1st | NCAA Regional |
| 2002 | Joel Holst | 29–15 | 16–5 | 1st | NCAA Regional |
| 2003 | Joel Holst | 33–12–1 | 14–6 | 1st | NCAA Regional |
| 2004 | Joel Holst | 30–15 | 15–5 | 1st | |
| 2005 | Joel Holst | 37–11 | 18–3 | 1st | College World Series |
| 2006 | Joel Holst | 27–15 | 11–5 | T–1st | |
| 2007 | Joel Holst | 28–13 | 18–5 | T–1st | |
| 2008 | Joel Holst | 27–15 | 17–3 | 1st | NCAA Regional |
| 2009 | Joel Holst | 28–20 | 14–10 | 4th | NCAA Regional |
| 2010 | Joel Holst | 25–19 | 17–7 | 2nd | |
| 2011 | Joel Holst | 26–18 | 16–8 | 2nd | |
| 2012 | Joel Holst | 23–20 | 14–10 | 3rd | |
| 2013 | Joel Holst | 35–10 | 20–6 | 1st | NCAA Regional |
| 2014 | Joel Holst | 25–17 | 19–9 | 2nd | |
| 2015 | Joel Holst | 33–14 | 19–5 | 1st | NCAA Regional |
| 2016 | Joel Holst | 34–13 | 24–4 | 1st | NCAA Regional |
| 2017 | Joel Holst | 33–14 | 19–5 | 1st | NCAA Regional |
| 2018 | Joel Holst | 26–13 | 15–6 | 2nd | |
Wartburg Knights (American Rivers Conference) (2019–Present)
| 2019 | Joel Holst | 13–26 | 9–15 | 7th | |
| 2020 | Joel Holst | 9–1 | 0–0 | | Season canceled due to COVID-19 |
| 2021 | Joel Holst | 14–28 | 12–20 | 6th | |
| 2022 | Joel Holst | 25–21 | 12–12 | 6th | |
| 2023 | Casey Chaplin | 14–21 | 9–15 | 6th | |
| 2024 | Casey Klunder | 23–19 | 12–12 | 6th | |
| 2025 | Casey Klunder | 21–20 | 12–12 | 4th | |
| 2026 | Casey Klunder | 28–17 | 13–11 | 4th | NCAA Regional |
| Total: | | 1300–1029–4 | | | |
National champion Postseason invitational champion Conference regular season champion Conference regular season and conference tournament champion Division regular season champion Division regular season and conference tournament champion Conference tournament champion

== American Rivers Conference tournaments ==
Wartburg has made 31 appearances in the American Rivers Conference baseball tournament and 20 appearances in the tournament championship game; both of which is the most in tournament history. They appeared in 1994, 1995, 1996, 1997, 1998, 1999, 2000, 2001, 2002, 2003, 2004, 2005, 2006, 2007, 2008, 2009, 2010, 2011, 2012, 2013, 2014, 2015, 2016, 2017, 2018, 2021, 2022, 2023, 2024, 2025, and 2026. They have an overall record of 71–43, with 11 championships, the last in 2026.

== NCAA Regional appearances ==
NCAA Regional Results
1997 NCAA DIII Central Regional in Carroll, IA

Lost to Carthage, 2–3
Lost to Aurora, 11–22

1998 NCAA Oshkosh Regional hosted by Wisconsin-Oshkosh

Lost to Wisconsin-Oshkosh, 0–7
Defeated Wisconsin-Stevens Point, 7–0
Lost to St. Thomas (MN), 8–16

1999 NCAA Geneva Regional hosted by Aurora

Lost to Simpson, 4–6
Lost to Carthage, 4–14

2000 NCAA Bloomington Regional hosted by Illinois Wesleyan

Defeated Aurora, 8–7
Defeated Westminster (MO), 8–0
Defeated Carthage, 8–5
Regional Championship

2001 NCAA Bloomington Regional hosted by Illinois Wesleyan

Lost to Hope, 1–2
Defeated Anderson (IN), 9–1
Defeated Wisconsin–Whitewater, 6–2
Defeated Illinois Wesleyan, 11–10(10 inn.)
Lost to Illinois Wesleyan, 6–7

2002 NCAA DIII Monmouth Regional hosted by Monmouth (IL)

Lost to Carthage, 2–3(10 inn.)
Lost to Aurora, 2–10

2003 NCAA Clinton Regional hosted by Mississippi College

Lost to Emory, 4–10
Defeated Millsaps, 13–12
Lost to Carthage, 2–5

2005 NCAA Bloomington Regional hosted by Illinois Wesleyan

Defeated Washington University St. Louis, 4–2
Defeated Illinois Wesleyan, 1–0
Defeated Illinois Wesleyan, 11–5
Defeated Edgewood, 11–3
Regional Championship

2008 NCAA Moline, Illinois Regional hosted by Augustana (IL)

Lost to Augustana (IL), 5–6
Defeated Webster, 2–0
Lost to Linfield, 5–57

2009 NCAA Moline, Illinois Regional hosted by Augustana (IL)

Lost to Millsaps, 3–5
Defeated Fontbonne, 4–2
Lost to Wisconsin–Whitewater, 3–8

2013 NCAA Moline, Illinois Regional hosted by Augustana (IL)

Lost to Adrian, 4–5
Defeated Ripon, 10–0
Lost to Augustana (IL), 3–9

2015 NCAA Waterloo Regional hosted by Wartburg

Lost to Anderson (IN), 3–4
Defeated Wisconsin-Stevens Point, 4–2
Lost to Carthage, 1–4

2016 NCAA Sauget Regional hosted by Webster

Lost to Rose–Hulman, 2–7
Defeated Westminster (MO), 8–0
Lost to Washington University St. Louis, 1–5

2017 NCAA Sauget Regional hosted by Webster

Defeated Webster, 3–0
Lost to North Central, 3–8
Defeated Washington University St. Louis, 1–0(13 inn.)
Lost to Birmingham–Southern, 1–6

2026 NCAA Decatur Regional hosted by Millikin

Lost to Baldwin Wallace, 3–9
Defeated Millikin, 2–1
Defeated Wisconsin–La Crosse, 7–6
Lost to Baldwin Wallace, 1–11

NAIA Area Tournament Results
1963 NAIA Area 4 Tournament in Kansas City, MO hosted by William Jewell

Defeated William Jewell, 3–1
Defeated William Jewell, 3–2
1963 NAIA Area 4 District Final in Waverly, IA hosted by Wartburg
Lost to Winona State, 0–4
Lost to Winona State, 1–2

1964 NAIA Area 4 Tournament in Waverly, IA hosted by Wartburg

Defeated William Jewell, 5–2
Defeated St. Cloud, 5–1
Defeated Wisconsin State–River Falls, 4–0
District Championship

== College World Series appearances ==
NCAA DIII College World Series Results
2000 College World Series in Appleton, WI

Defeated Southern Maine, 2–1
Lost to Allegheny, 2–3
Lost to Montclair, 2–7
6th Place

2005 College World Series in Appleton, WI

Lost to Chapman, 1–8
Defeated Trinity (CT), 4–1
Defeated Rowan, 8–6
Lost to SUNY-Cortland, 0–5
4th Place

NAIA College World Series Results
1964 NAIA World Series St. Joseph, Mo

Defeated West Liberty State, 2–1
Lost to Grambling, 1–3
Defeated Mayville State, 9–0†

† Mayville State's games were all ruled forfeits, with their opponents awarded 9–0 victories.

== Professional Players ==
Wartburg has had seven professional baseball players and four selections in the Major League Baseball draft since it began in 1965.

| Year | Player | Draft Round | Team |
|---|---|---|---|
| 1967 | Robert Meyer | 49 | Minnesota Twins |
| 1969 | Thomas Cain | 16 | Chicago White Sox |
| 1970 | Virgil Erickson | 22 | St. Louis Cardinals |
| 2001 | Matt Thede | – | Gulf Coast League Expos |
| 2008 | Ryan Grant | – | Sioux Falls Canaries |
| 2011 | Bradley Watson | 37 | St. Louis Cardinals |
| 2023 | Dylan Gotto | – | Idaho Falls Chukars |

== Current coaching staff ==
- Head coach: Casey Klunder
- Hitting, infield, recruiting coordinator: Tyler Willis
- Pitching: Kyle Dupic
- Pitching: Matt Milewski
- Catching: Hunter Destival
- Outfield: Jared Pirkl
- Assistant Hitting Coach: Corey Carlson
- Strength and Conditioning: Ethan Hayes
- Athletic Trainer: Danny Drees

== Head coaching history ==
As of the completion of 2026 season

| Tenure | Coach | Years | Record | Pct. |
|---|---|---|---|---|
| 1958–1982 | Earnest Oppermann | 25 | 292–300 | .493 |
| 1983–1993 | John Kurtt | 11 | 192–210 | .478 |
| 1994–1995 | Randy Moore | 2 | 29–35 | .453 |
| 1996–2022 | Joel Holst | 27 | 761–407–4 | .651 |
| 2023 | Casey Chaplin | 1† | 14–21 | .400 |
| 2024–present | Casey Klunder | 3 | 72–56 | .563 |
| Totals | 5 coaches | 69 seasons | 1300–1029–4 | .558 |

† Casey Chaplin served as the interim head coach for the 1 season following the departure of Joel Holst.
