= Joel Holst =

American college baseball coach

Current position
- Title: Head Coach
- Team: Independence HS (IA)

Biographical details
- Born: Lowden, IA
- Education: Coe College

Playing career
- 1981–1985: Coe

Coaching career (HC unless noted)
- 1985-1988: West Delaware HS (IA)
- 1989-1990: Northwest Missouri State (Asst)
- 1991–1995: Loras
- 1996–2023: Wartburg
- 2024: Janesville HS (IA)
- 2025–present: Independence HS (IA)

Head coaching record
- Overall: 861–488–4 (.638) (college); 145–78 (.650) (high school)
- Tournaments: NCAA: 21–28; IIAC/ARC: 63–33

Accomplishments and honors

Championships
- 16 IIAC/ARC (1997-2008, 2013, 2015-2017); 11 IIAC/ARC Tournament (1998-2003, 2005, 2008-2009, 2013, 2017); 2 NCAA Regional Champion (2000, 2005)

Awards
- 11x IIAC/ARC Coach of the Year; 2x Central Region Coach of the year (2000, 2005)

Joel Holst is a current American baseball coach at Independence HS (IA) in Independence, Iowa, following one year as the head coach of Janesville high school. Holst played college baseball and college football at Coe College from 1981 to 1985. He then served as the head coach at West Delaware high school in Manchester, Iowa before making a stop at Northwest Missouri State as an assistant. He got his first head coaching job at the collegiate level at Loras College before arriving at Wartburg College in 1996. He reached 1000 career wins in 2025 while coaching at Janesville High School.

== Playing career ==
Holst played both baseball and football for Coe College in Cedar Rapids, Iowa. He was a three starter on both teams. He remains the career record holder for highest batting average at .403. In 2011, Holst was inducted to the Coe College athletic hall of fame.

== Coaching career ==
=== Loras College ===
Holst began his first collegiate head coaching job at Loras College in Dubuque, Iowa in 1991. He inherited a team with a losing record and finished the 1991 season 5-20. In just 3 years at the helm he would lead them to their first winning record in 12 years following the 1993 season. His best season would come the following year when they would go on to have their first 30 win season in program history. He would leave the Loras Duhawks after 5 seasons with a 100-80 overall record.

=== Wartburg College ===
Joel Holst made the move to Wartburg in the fall of 1995. It took him just two years to reach the top of the conference. In just his second season, his 1997 Knights baseball team won 30 games and the conference regular season championship and a birth to the 1997 NCAA Regional. From there they would go on an unprecedented run winning 12 straight championships from 1997 to 2008. In his time at Wartburg he has won over 700 games and 16 championships, his most recent coming in 2017. On May 12, 2018, Holst joined the 800 win club following an 8–4 win over his alma mater, Coe College in the IIAC tournament. In 2020, he was inducted into the Iowa baseball coaches hall of fame. Holst resigned from his position at Wartburg prior to the 2023 season.

== Head coaching record ==
Record table
Season	Team	Overall	Conference	Standing	Postseason
Loras Duhawks (Iowa Intercollegiate Athletic Conference) (1991–1995)
1991	Loras	5-20	5-11		
1992	Loras	15-20	8-11		
1993	Loras	22-12	10-10		
1994	Loras	31-10	12-4	2nd	
1995	Loras	27-18	8-8	T-4th	
Loras:		100-80	43-44		
Wartburg Knights (Iowa Intercollegiate Athletic Conference) (1996–2018)
1996	Wartburg	20-20-1	7-9	4th	
1997	Wartburg	30–16	16-4	1st	NCAA Regional
1998	Wartburg	40-10	20-4	1st	NCAA Regional
1999	Wartburg	33-13-1	17-6	1st	NCAA Regional
2000	Wartburg	41-9	22-2	1st	College World Series
2001	Wartburg	37-9-1	20-2	1st	NCAA Regional
2002	Wartburg	29-15	16-5	1st	NCAA Regional
2003	Wartburg	33-12-1	14-6	1st	NCAA Regional
2004	Wartburg	30-15	15-5	1st	
2005	Wartburg	37-11	18-3	1st	College World Series
2006	Wartburg	27-15	11-5	T–1st	
2007	Wartburg	28-13	18-5	T–1st	
2008	Wartburg	27-15	17-3	1st	NCAA Regional
2009	Wartburg	28-20	14-10	4th	NCAA Regional
2010	Wartburg	25-19	17-7	2nd	
2011	Wartburg	26-18	16-8	2nd	
2012	Wartburg	23-20	14–10	3rd	
2013	Wartburg	35-10	20-6	1st	NCAA Regional
2014	Wartburg	25-17	19-9	2nd	
2015	Wartburg	33-14	19–5	1st	NCAA Regional
2016	Wartburg	34-13	24-4	1st	NCAA Regional
2017	Wartburg	33-14	19-5	1st	NCAA Regional
2018	Wartburg	26-13	15-6	2nd	
Wartburg Knights (American Rivers Conference) (2019–Present)
2019	Wartburg	13-26	9-15	7th	
2020	Wartburg	9-1	0–0		Season canceled due to COVID-19
2021	Wartburg	14-28	12-20	6th	
2022	Wartburg	25-21	12-12	6th	
Wartburg:		761-408	416-176		
Total:		861-488–4			
National champion Postseason invitational champion Conference regular season champion Conference regular season and conference tournament champion Division regular season champion Division regular season and conference tournament champion Conference tournament champion
