= Nova Southeastern Sharks =

Coordinates: 26.07790°N 80.24189°W

- University: Nova Southeastern University
- Nickname: Sharks
- NCAA: Division II
- Conference: Sunshine State (primary)
- Athletic director: Ryan Romero (interim)
- Location: Fort Lauderdale-Davie, Florida
- Varsity teams: 17 (7 men's, 10 women's)
- Basketball arena: Rick Case Arena
- Baseball stadium: NSU Baseball Complex
- Softball stadium: NSU Softball Stadium
- Soccer stadium: NSU Soccer Stadium
- Aquatics center: NSU Aquatic Center
- Tennis venue: NSU Tennis Center at Rolling Hills
- Colors: Navy blue and gray
- Mascot: Razor the Shark
- Website: nsusharks.com
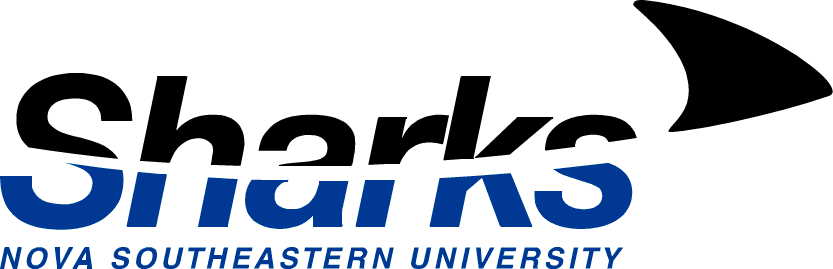

Team NCAA championships
- 15

The Nova Southeastern Sharks are the athletic teams representing Nova Southeastern University. Located in Davie, Florida, they are a member of the NCAA Division II ranks and have primarily competed in the Sunshine State Conference (SSC) since the 2002–03 academic year. The Sharks previously competed in the Florida Sun Conference of the National Association of Intercollegiate Athletics (NAIA) from 1990–91 to 2001–02.

== History ==
From 1982 to 2002, Nova Southeastern was an National Association of Intercollegiate Athletics (NAIA) institution. They competed in the Florida Sun Conference from 1990 to 2002.

In 2002, Nova Southeastern University transitioned from NAIA to Division II. After completing the 3-year transitional period, they became fully fledged members in 2005. In 2006–07, they built the Don Taft University Center, which most notably houses Rick Case Arena, a multipurpose venue that hosts the basketball and volleyball teams.

From 1982 until 2004, the Sharks were called the Knights. In 2005, the university unveiled the new Sharks logo and mascot, which NSU students selected.

== Sports sponsored ==
Men's sports	Women's sports
Baseball	Basketball
Basketball	Cross country
Cross country	Golf
Golf	Soccer
Soccer	Softball
Swimming	Swimming
Track & field	Tennis
	Track & field
	Volleyball
	Rowing

NSU competes in 17 intercollegiate varsity sports, seven men's and ten women's.

== National championships ==
The Sharks have won 16 team NCAA national championships, all at the Division II level.

=== Team ===
Association	Division	Sport	Year	Opponent/Runner-up	Score
NCAA (17)	Division II (17)	Baseball (1)	2016	Millersville	2–1, 8–6
NCAA (17)	Division II (17)	Men's basketball (2)	2023	West Liberty	111–101
NCAA (17)	Division II (17)	Men's basketball (2)	2025	Cal State Dominguez Hills Toros	74–73
NCAA (17)	Division II (17)	Men's golf (3)	2012	Chico State	5–0
NCAA (17)	Division II (17)	Men's golf (3)	2015	Lynn	3–2
NCAA (17)	Division II (17)	Men's golf (3)	2023	Oklahoma Christian	3–2
NCAA (17)	Division II (17)	Women's golf (4)	2009	Grand Valley State	1,230–1,245
NCAA (17)	Division II (17)	Women's golf (4)	2010	Rollins	1,180–1,220
NCAA (17)	Division II (17)	Women's golf (4)	2011	Rollins	1,157–1,185
NCAA (17)	Division II (17)	Women's golf (4)	2012	Florida Southern	1,234–1,254
NCAA (17)	Division II (17)	Rowing (1)	2013	Barry	20–15
NCAA (17)	Division II (17)	Women's swimming & diving (4)	2023	Indianapolis	536.5–488.5
NCAA (17)	Division II (17)	Women's swimming & diving (4)	2024	Colorado Mesa	487–461.5
NCAA (17)	Division II (17)	Women's swimming & diving (4)	2025	Drury	475–463
NCAA (17)	Division II (17)	Women's swimming & diving (4)	2026	Tampa	486-424.5
NCAA (17)		Women's Tennis (1)	2024	Barry	4-2
			2026	Catawba	4-1

== Facilities ==
=== Don Taft University Center ===
Nova Southeastern University's University Center opened in the summer of 2006. The building is approximately 366,000 square feet (34,000 m^{2}). The University Center is now considered the university's hub for all students. The multipurpose facility serves athletics, extracurriculars, and leisure activities. The Rick Case Arena, which seats 4,500, is the home for the men's and women's basketball teams and the women's volleyball team. The arena has one main court for play and two practice courts on the floor above. The arena can also host concerts, lectures, and special events for the university and surrounding area.

The center's central atrium also hosts a 3-story mural hand-painted by Guy Harvey depicting a view of sharks and other undersea life.

The Rick Case Arena features 4,500 seats, each with a seat back. The lower level has over 1,000 permanent chair-back seats, while the upper level has over 3,000 seats. The upper level also houses the world's largest automated telescopic seating system, which adds over 2,000 chair-back seats on either side when extended.

The Rick Case Arena also features club-level seating along the baseline for boosters and donors. The club has 66 cushioned seats overlooking the court and a catering area.

=== NSU Softball Stadium ===
The NSU Softball Stadium is home to the Nova Southeastern University Softball team. Completed in 2024, the stadium seats 1000 and replaces the AD Griffin Sports Complex. It hosts a range of new features, including LED lights, an updated locker room, a new scoreboard, and an updated sound system. The stadium is adjacent to the school's Aquatics Center and Athletics Department and has a parking lot for easy access to the facility.

=== NSU Baseball Complex ===
The NSU Baseball Complex hosts the school's baseball team and is the site of the Frontier Independent Baseball League's annual player combine and tryouts. Built in 1988, the venue seats 500 and has a press box. The complex is conveniently located on Nova Southeastern's campus and is adjacent to a parking lot for visiting fans.

=== NSU Soccer Stadium ===
The NSU Soccer Stadium opened in 2023 and replaced the old soccer complex. It is located at the former Miami Dolphins practice facility and seats 1000. The venue is home to the school's men's and women's soccer programs and has a turf playing surface.

=== Miami Dolphins Training Facility ===
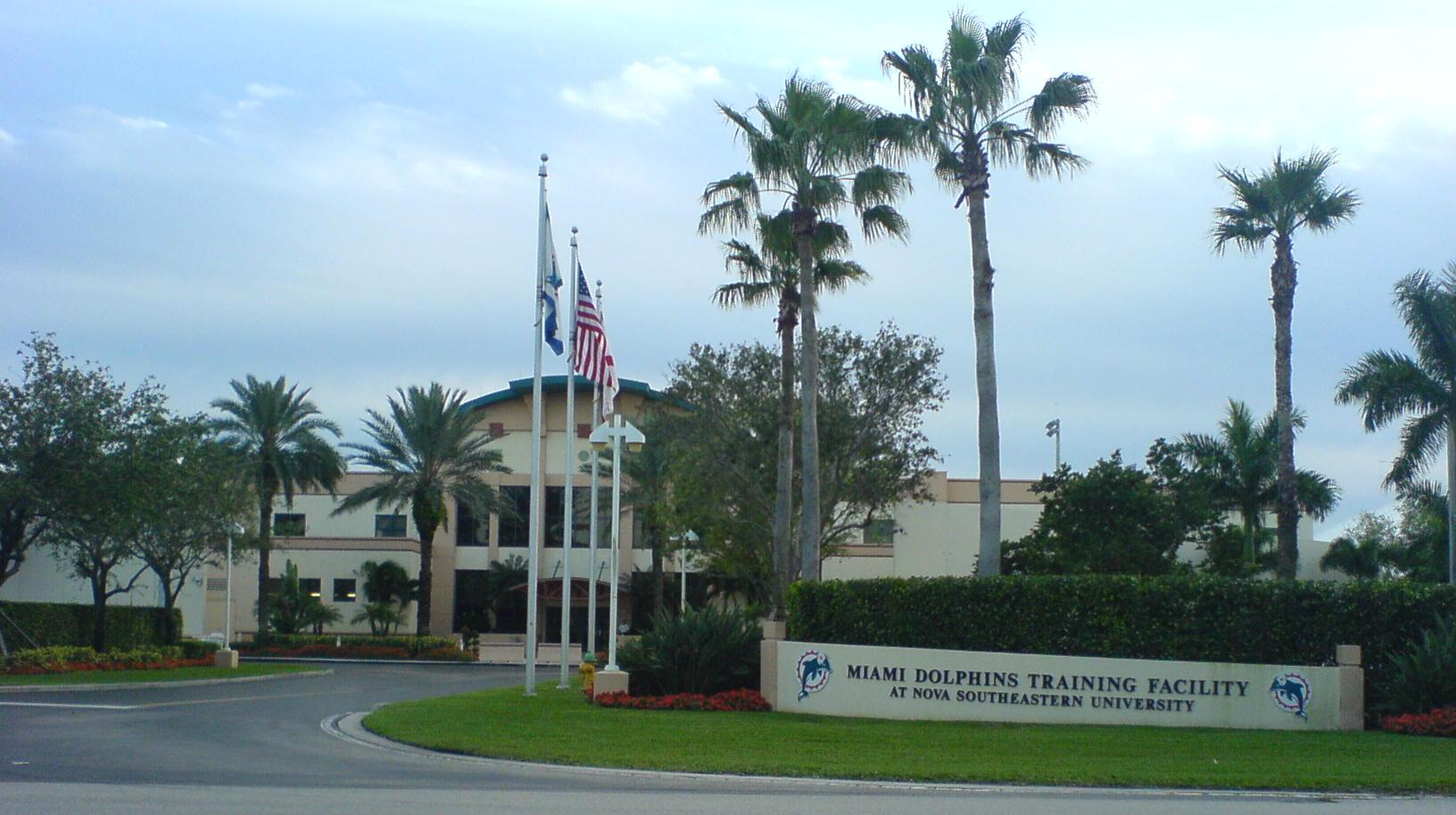
Miami Dolphins Training Facility

The Miami Dolphins Training Facility was located on the main campus of Nova Southeastern University until 2021. The facility was brought to the campus through connections with the Miami Dolphins. The team's former owner, Wayne Huizenga, is the namesake of the school's Business College.

The facility was a practice area for college football teams competing in Miami-area college bowl games. It also hosted Super Bowl teams; most recently, the Indianapolis Colts practiced there for Super Bowl XLI.

== Mascot ==
=== Knights ===
Nova Southeastern University's athletics teams were initially known as the Knights. This name dates back to when the school was just Nova University. After the school merged with Southeastern University, it searched for a new identity but eventually decided to stay as the Knights.

=== Sharks ===
Nova Southeastern University wanted to rebrand after completing its reclassification period from NAIA to Division II. In 2005, the administration organized a school-wide contest to help create a new name for its athletics teams. After several rounds of voting, the two finalists, the Sharks and the Stingrays (both submitted by NSU law student Rian Kinney), were pitted against each other. The Sharks won, and NSU became one of only three college athletic teams to use a shark mascot, along with fellow Division II member Hawaii Pacific and Division I Long Island University. The shark mascot has become part of the school's identity, with their two slogans "Hungry For More" and "Shark County" referencing the animal. The mascot, known as Razor, is a Shortfin mako shark, chosen due to its speed, power, and fearlessness.

== Notable alumni ==
=== Baseball ===
- Rob Brzezinski
- J. D. Martinez
- Miles Mikolas
- Mike Fiers
- Carlos Asuaje
- Mark Calvi

=== Soccer ===
- Lorcan Cronin
- Aly Hassan
- Darryl Gordon
- Darwin Lom
- Juan Ramos

=== Men's basketball ===
- Alex Gynes (NBL)
- Tommy Greer (NBL)
- Rhys Martin (NBL)
- Tim Coenraad (NBL)
- Shane McDonald (NBL)

=== Swimming & diving ===
- Esau Simpson
- David van der Colff
