= Western Washington Vikings women's rowing =

American rowing club

Washington Vikings women's rowing
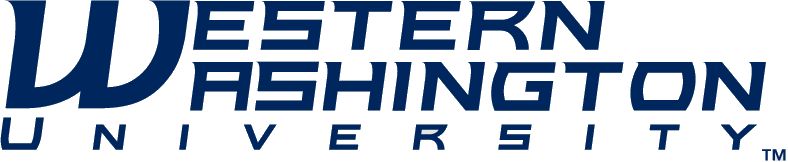
- Founded: 1978; 48 years ago
- University: Western Washington University
- Conference: Great Northwest Athletic Conference; NCAA Division II Division
- Location: Bellingham, Washington, US

The Western Washington University women's rowing team has won nine total titles since the NCAA Division II rowing championship began in 2002. Between 2005 and 2011 they won 7 consecutive titles, becoming the first NCAA rowing team to do so since the NCAA began recognizing women's rowing in 1997. Prior to 1997, they placed first in two non-NCAA national championships at the National Collegiate Rowing Championships. They are regarded as the most successful women's rowing team in Division II, and currently compete in the Great Northwest Athletic Conference. They compete alongside Cal Poly Humboldt, University of Central Oklahoma, and Seattle Pacific. The GNAC is responsible for 6 of the past 7 Division II rowing champions. Since 2016, WWU has competed in 7 of the last 8 playoffs (regattas).

== History ==
The Vikings have been a team since 1978, but were not granted varsity status at Western until 1982. As DII women's rowing championships were not conducted by the NCAA until 2002, the highest-level race for the team was conducted at the National Collegiate Rowing Championships. They won their first national title there in 1984 with a lightweight eight victory under coach Brien Squires and their second in 1996 with a victory from the varsity eight in the Division II/III championship under coach Ron Goodman. Western Washington University joined the NCAA in 1999 and participated in the inaugural DII women's rowing championships in 2002. John Fuchs coached the team from 1998 to 2023 and led them to their first nine NCAA titles. Courtney Moeller, a member of the 2005 team which won the team's first NCAA national championship and began their seven year streak of dominance, took over for the 2024 season.
