= American Rivers Conference baseball tournament =

College baseball conference championship

- Conference baseball championship
- Sport: Baseball
- Conference: ARC
- Number of teams: 6
- Format: double elimination
- Current stadium: Veterans Memorial Stadium (Cedar Rapids)
- Current location: Cedar Rapids, Iowa
- Played: 2004–present
- Current champion: Wartburg
- Most championships: Wartburg (11)
- Official website: American Rivers Baseball Tournament

Host stadiums
- Veterans Memorial Stadium (Cedar Rapids) (2004-2019, 2022-present); Riverfront Stadium (Waterloo) (2000-2003); Hertel Field(Wartburg) (1996, 1998, 2021); Ash Park(Cornell) (1998); Carroll Stadium (1997); Luther College Baseball Diamond (1995); Robertson Woods Field (1994)

The American Rivers Conference baseball tournament is the conference championship tournament in baseball for the NCAA Division III American Rivers Conference. The winner of the tournament receives the conference's automatic bid to the NCAA Division III baseball tournament.

The tournament was previously known as the Iowa Intercollegiate Athletic Conference baseball tournament, changing its name with the league in 2018–19.

== History ==
The A-R-C, formally known as the Iowa Intercollegiate Athletic Conference (IIAC), baseball tournament began in 1994. From 1994 to 1997, the tournament was a 9-team, 3 pod double-elimination tournament. In 1998, the tournament shrunk to a 6-team double elimination format. The tournament has been hosted in Cedar Rapids at Veterans Memorial Stadium since 2004.

== Champions ==
=== By year ===
| Year | School | Site | Head coach |
|---|---|---|---|
| 1994 | Simpson | Robertson Woods Field • Fayette, IA | John Siranni, Simpson |
| 1995 | Upper Iowa | Luther College Baseball Diamond • Decorah, IA | Rick Heller, Upper Iowa |
| 1996 | Upper Iowa | Hertel Field • Waverly, IA | Rick Heller, Upper Iowa |
| 1997 | Upper Iowa | Carroll Stadium • Carroll, IA | Rick Heller, Upper Iowa |
| 1998 | Wartburg | Hertel Field • Waverly, IA | Joel Holst, Wartburg |
| 1999 | Wartburg | Ash Park • Mt. Vernon, IA | Joel Holst, Wartburg |
| 2000 | Wartburg | Riverfront Stadium • Waterloo, IA | Joel Holst, Wartburg |
| 2001 | Wartburg | Riverfront Stadium • Waterloo, IA | Joel Holst, Wartburg |
| 2002 | Rained Out | Riverfront Stadium • Waterloo, IA | * |
| 2003 | Wartburg | Riverfront Stadium • Waterloo, IA | Joel Holst, Wartburg |
| 2004 | Simpson | Veterans Memorial Stadium • Cedar Rapids, IA | John Sirianni, Simpson |
| 2005 | Wartburg | Veterans Memorial Stadium • Cedar Rapids, IA | Joel Holst, Wartburg |
| 2006 | Rained Out | Veterans Memorial Stadium • Cedar Rapids, IA | * |
| 2007 | Luther | Veterans Memorial Stadium • Cedar Rapids, IA | Brian Gillogly, Luther |
| 2008 | Wartburg | Veterans Memorial Stadium • Cedar Rapids, IA | Joel Holst, Wartburg |
| 2009 | Wartburg | Veterans Memorial Stadium • Cedar Rapids, IA | Joel Holst, Wartburg |
| 2010 | Buena Vista | Veterans Memorial Stadium • Cedar Rapids, IA | Steve Eddie, Buena Vista |
| 2011 | Coe | Veterans Memorial Stadium • Cedar Rapids, IA | Steve Cook, Coe |
| 2012 | Coe | Veterans Memorial Stadium • Cedar Rapids, IA | Steve Cook, Coe |
| 2013 | Wartburg | Veterans Memorial Stadium • Cedar Rapids, IA | Joel Holst, Wartburg |
| 2014 | Buena Vista | Veterans Memorial Stadium • Cedar Rapids, IA | Steve Eddie, Buena Vista |
| 2015 | Coe | Veterans Memorial Stadium • Cedar Rapids, IA | Steve Cook, Coe |
| 2016 | Luther | Veterans Memorial Stadium • Cedar Rapids, IA | Bryan Nikkel, Luther |
| 2017 | Wartburg | Veterans Memorial Stadium • Cedar Rapids, IA | Joel Holst, Wartburg |
| 2018 | Dubuque | Veterans Memorial Stadium • Cedar Rapids, IA | Paul Wyczawski, Dubuque |
| 2019 | Buena Vista | Veterans Memorial Stadium • Cedar Rapids, IA | Steve Eddie, Buena Vista |
| 2020 | Cancelled due to the COVID-19 pandemic | | |
| 2021 | Luther | Harms Stadium at Hertel Field • Waverly, IA | Bryan Nikkel, Luther |
| 2022 | Coe | Veterans Memorial Stadium • Cedar Rapids, IA | Steve Cook, Coe |
| 2023 | Loras | Veterans Memorial Stadium • Cedar Rapids, IA | Carl Tebon, Loras |
| 2024 | Coe | Veterans Memorial Stadium • Cedar Rapids, IA | Steve Cook, Coe |
| 2025 | Buena Vista | Veterans Memorial Stadium • Cedar Rapids, IA | Steve Eddie, Buena Vista |
| 2026 | Wartburg | Veterans Memorial Stadium • Cedar Rapids, IA | Casey Klunder, Wartburg |

=== By school ===
Updated as of 2026 season

| School | Appearances | W-L | Pct | Tourney Titles | Title Years | Notes |
|---|---|---|---|---|---|---|
| Wartburg | 31 | | | 11 | 1998, 1999, 2000, 2001, 2003, 2005, 2008, 2009, 2013, 2017, 2026 | 20 championship game appearances |
| Coe | 23 | | | 5 | 2011, 2012, 2015, 2022, 2024 | 10 championship game appearances |
| Buena Vista | 24 | | | 4 | 2010, 2014, 2019, 2025 | 6 championship game appearances |
| Luther | 23 | | | 3 | 2007, 2016, 2021 | 4 championship game appearances |
| Upper Iowa | 24 | | | 3 | 1995, 1996, 1997 | 4 championship game appearances, left the conference in 2003 |
| Simpson | 24 | | | 2 | 1994, 2004 | 5 championship game appearances |
| Dubuque | 12 | | | 1 | 2018 | 2 championship game appearances |
| Loras | 22 | | | 1 | 2023 | 4 championship game appearances |
| Central | 23 | | | 0 | | 1 championship game appearance |
| Nebraska Wesleyan | 3 | | | 0 | | 1 championship game appearance Joined the conference in 2016 |
| Cornell | 5 | | | 0 | | Left the conference in 2012 |
| William Penn | 7 | | | 0 | | Left the conference in 2001 |
