= Western Washington Vikings =

- University: Western Washington University
- Conference: Great Northwest Athletic Conference
- NCAA: Division II
- Athletic director: Jim Sterk Steve Brummel (interim)
- Location: Bellingham, Washington
- Varsity teams: 15
- Basketball arena: Sam Carver Gymnasium
- Baseball stadium: Viking Field
- Track stadium: Civic Stadium
- Mascot: Victor E. Viking
- Nickname: Vikings
- Colors: Navy blue, white, slate blue, and silver
- Website: wwuvikings.com
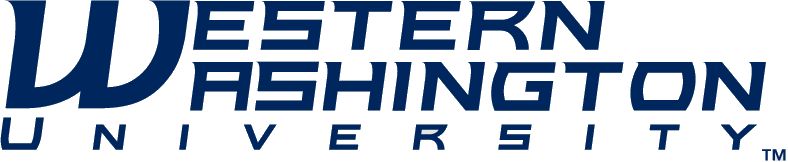

The Western Washington Vikings represent Western Washington University in intercollegiate sports in the Great Northwest Athletic Conference of the NCAA Division II with the exception of the women's rowing team which is a member of the Northwest Collegiate Rowing Conference. WWU has been an official member of NCAA Division II since September 1998. Their mascot is Victor E. Viking.

Western Washington sponsors six sports for men and nine sports for women with approximately 350 student athletes.

== Mascot ==
The story of Victor E. Viking, the mascot, is that he visited Bellingham in 1923 and decided to become a supporter of the team. He has since become the mascot representation of the Vikings. In 2015, The Washington Post reported on controversy at Western over the mascot. Some claim that an imposing white man does not sufficiently represent the school, while some argue against removing the mascot that had been representing Western for nearly 100 years. The controversy was renewed in 2022, but Victor continues as the mascot of the institution as of October 2025.

== Student athletes ==
The 2010 NCAA graduation rate study showed that 69 percent of Western student-athletes receive their degrees in six years or less based on the Federal Graduation Rate formula, a rate the same as that of the full student body. This is 13 percentage points higher than the average for NCAA Division II schools nationally and 15 points higher than the average for the nine U.S. schools in the Great Northwest Athletic Conference. Using the NCAA Academic Success Rate, which includes all freshman student-athletes from the fall of 2003 and also accounts for student-athletes who transfer into or out of the institution, Western posted an 85 percent success rate, compared to the NCAA II national number of 73 percent. The average ASR of the nine U.S. GNAC schools was 77 percent.

== Sports sponsored ==
=== Varsity teams ===
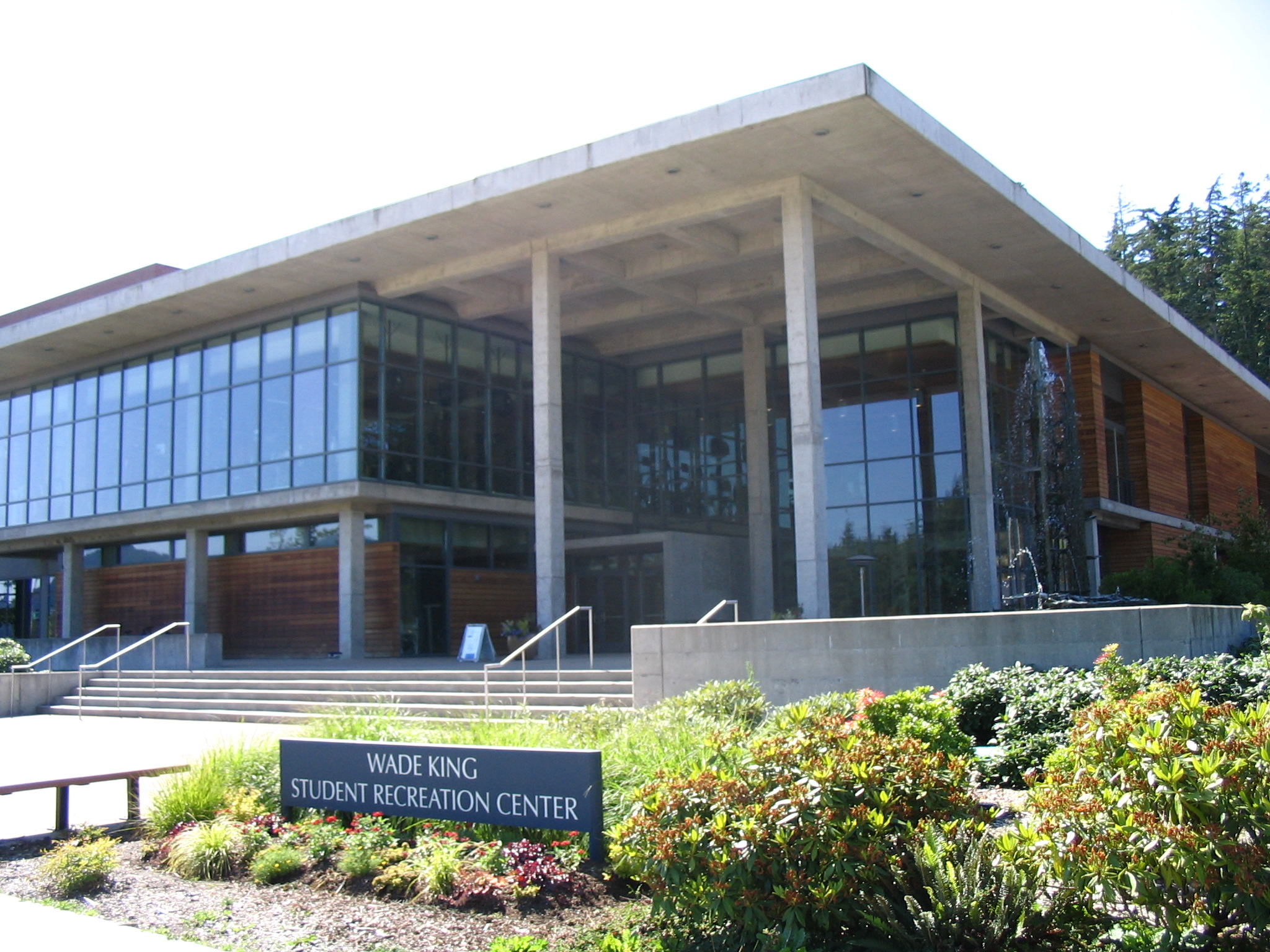
Wade King Student Recreation Center

Men's sports	Women's sports
Basketball	Basketball
Cross country	Cross country
Golf	Golf
Soccer	Rowing
Track and field	Soccer
	Softball
	Track and field
	Volleyball

=== Basketball ===
WWU won the 2011–12 NCAA Division II men's basketball national championship, just the second collegiate crown in that sport in state of Washington history and the first since 1976. WWU reached the national semifinals in men's basketball in 2001 and women's basketball in 2000. WWU ranks among the top 15 in women's basketball victories among all four-year schools with that program making 12 NCAA tournament appearances in 13 years.

=== Former varsity teams ===
Baseball, field hockey, football, men's rowing, men's swimming, men's tennis, women's tennis, wrestling

=== Clubs teams ===
- Baseball
- Men's Crew
- Climbing
- Cycling
- Equestrian
- Fencing
- Figure Skating
- Ice Hockey
- Judo
- Men's Lacrosse
- Women's Lacrosse
- Men's Rugby
- Women's Rugby
- Sailing
- Swimming
- Tennis
- Men's Ultimate
- Women's Ultimate
- Men's Volleyball
- Women's Volleyball
- Men's Water Polo
- Women's Water Polo
- Water Skiing
- Wakeboarding
- Wrestling

== Facilities ==
=== Harrington Field ===
The Vikings men's and women's soccer teams play their home matches at Robert S. Harrington Field, an outdoor stadium with an artificial turf pitch and bleacher seating for 500 spectators. It opened on August 23, 2014, with a men's soccer match against Seattle University that drew an attendance of 271. The stadium is named for Robert S. Harrington and was partially financed with a $1 million donation from his family; the chosen site had been two open field that were graded to create a level playing surface. It was formally dedicated on September 27 during a doubleheader with a crowd of 1,179 spectators. The soccer teams had previously used the stadium of Whatcom Community College and other venues in the Bellingham area since leaving the campus in 2000.

== National championships ==
Western Washington University is credited with 13 official team National Championship. 1 at the NAIA level and 12 NCAA Championships.

Association	Division	Sport	Year	Opponent/Runner-Up	Score
NAIA	Division 1	Softball	1998	Simon Fraser	5–1
NCAA	Division II	Women's Rowing	2005	Mercyhurst	20–12
NCAA	Division II	Women's Rowing	2006	Barry	20–15
NCAA	Division II	Women's Rowing	2007	UC San Diego	20–15
NCAA	Division II	Women's Rowing	2008	UC San Diego	20–15
NCAA	Division II	Women's Rowing	2009	Mercyhurst	18–13
NCAA	Division II	Women's Rowing	2010	Seattle Pacific	20–11
NCAA	Division II	Women's Rowing	2011	Mercyhurst	20–13
NCAA	Division II	Men's Basketball	2012	Montevallo	72–65
NCAA	Division II	Women's Soccer	2016	Grand Valley State	3–2
NCAA	Division II	Women's Rowing	2017	Central Oklahoma	17–16
NCAA	Division II	Women's Soccer	2022	West Chester	2-1
NCAA	Division II	Women's Rowing	2024	Mercyhurst	22-21

Additionally, Western's club sports have won the following championships:

Sport	Division	Year
Road Cycling	Division II	2007
CycloCross	Division II	2007
CycloCross	Division II	2009
Men's Hockey	Division II	2013
Women's Handball	Division II	2014
Water Skiing	Division II	2015
Women's Baseball	Division I-III	2024

The WWU Women's Baseball club was founded in the Fall of 2023 and won the club sports championship their inaugural year. As women's baseball is relatively new for club sports, there have only been six teams welcomed to the Women's College Club Baseball final. Those teams range from Division I to Division III.

=== Other accomplishments ===
In 2010–11, WWU placed seventh among 310 NCAA Division II schools in the Sports Director's Cup national all-sports standings, the second-highest finish in school history. The Vikings were sixth in 2009–10 and 10th in 2008–09. WWU has had eight straight Top 50 finishes and been among the Top 100 in each of its first 13 seasons as an NCAA II member. In 2010–11, Western won its third straight and seventh overall Great Northwest Athletic Conference All-Sports championship, taking league titles in volleyball, men's golf and women's golf, and the regular-season crown in women's basketball. The Vikings, who won the Northwest Collegiate Rowing Conference championship, placed second in men's and women's cross country, men's and women's outdoor track, men's indoor track and softball.

Other accomplishments include:

- Seven straight Division II national titles in women's rowing from 2005 to 2011, the first NCAA school in any division to achieve that distinction.
- Two National Collegiate Rowing Championship victories in 1984 and 1996, prior to the addition of women's rowing to the NCAA.
- Second nationally in volleyball in 2007, and the fourth-longest league winning streak in NCAA II of 57 from 2002–04.
- 38-game victory string in women's soccer from 1982–84.
