= 1964 NAIA World Series =

1964 NAIA baseball tournament
- 1964 NAIA World Series
- Teams: 8
- Format: Double elimination
- Finals site: Phil Welch Stadium; St. Joseph, Missouri
- Champions: West Liberty State (1st title)
- Winning coach: George Kovalik
- MVP: Frank Ujcich (P) (West Liberty State)

The 1964 NAIA World Series was the eighth annual tournament hosted by the National Association of Intercollegiate Athletics to determine the national champion of baseball among its member colleges and universities in the United States and Canada.

The tournament was played at Phil Welch Stadium in St. Joseph, Missouri.

West Liberty State (27-7) defeated Grambling (24-5) in the championship series, 6–4 and 3–2, to win the Hilltoppers' first NAIA World Series. West Liberty State, who lost its first game of the tournament, won six consecutive games out of the consolation bracket to claim the title.

West Liberty State pitcher Frank Ujcich was named tournament MVP.

Prior to the Mayville State and West Liberty State game, it was discovered that Mayville State's catcher Dave Pavlesic had signed a professional contract in 1961 with the Newton-Conover Twins of the Class D Western Carolina League. As a result, Mayville State was disqualified from the tournament and had to forfeit all tournament games with their opponents being awarded 9–0 victories.

== Bracket ==
First round	Second round	Semifinals	National Championship
Eastern Illinois	1
Sam Houston State	3
Sam Houston State	4
Georgia Southern	5
Georgia Southern	11
Mayville State	7
Georgia Southern	0
Grambling	4
Wartburg	2
West Liberty State	1
Wartburg	1
Grambling	3
Grambling	3
Western Washington State	2	Grambling	4	2
West Liberty State	6	3
Consolation first round	Consolation second round	Consolation third round	Consolation fourth round
Forfeit (Note: Prior to being disqualified from the tournament, Mayville State defeated Eastern Illinois 10–9 and Wartburg 19–5. Both Eastern Illinois and Wartburg were awarded 9–0 victories as a result.)
Forfeit	Wartburg	9
Eastern Illinois	9	Mayville State	0	Forfeit (Note: West Liberty State advanced by default after Mayville State was disqualified from the tournament.)	Georgia Southern	0
Mayville State	0	Mayville State	0	West Liberty State	5
West Liberty State	9
Sam Houston State	1
West Liberty State	6	West Liberty State	2
Western Washington State	2

== See also ==
- 1964 NCAA University Division baseball tournament
