= 1999 NCAA Division II baseball tournament =

- Season: 1999
- Finals site: Paterson Field; Montgomery, Alabama
- Champions: Chico State (2nd title)
- Runner-up: Kennesaw State (3rd CWS Appearance)
- Winning coach: Lindsay Meggs (2nd title)
- MOP: John-Eric Hernandez, P (Chico State)
- Attendance: 19,303

The 1999 NCAA Division II baseball tournament was the postseason tournament hosted by the NCAA to determine the national champion of baseball among its Division II members at the end of the 1999 NCAA Division II baseball season.

The final, eight-team double elimination tournament, also known as the College World Series, was played at Paterson Field in Montgomery, Alabama from May 22–29, 1999.

Chico State defeated Kennesaw State, 11–5, in the championship game to claim the Wildcats' second Division II national title and second in three seasons (1997).

== Bracket ==
=== College World Series ===
First Round; May 22–25, 1999
Ashland	15
Adelphi	18
Chico State	10
Rockhurst	4
Ashland	9
Rockhurst	18
North Alabama	15
West Virginia State	9
Carson–Newman	5
Kennesaw State	6
West Virginia State	14
Carson–Newman	4

Second Round; May 24–26, 1999
Adelphi	3
Chico State	11
North Alabama	3
Rockhurst	4
North Alabama	3
Kennesaw State	10
Adelphi	9
West Virginia State	12

Semifinals; May 27–28, 1999
Chico State	7
Rockhurst	2
Kennesaw State	0	4
West Virginia State	3	1

Championship; May 29, 1999
Chico State	11
Kennesaw State	5

== See also ==
- 1999 NCAA Division I baseball tournament
- 1999 NCAA Division III baseball tournament
- 1999 NAIA World Series
- 1999 NCAA Division II softball tournament
