= 1999 NCAA Division II softball tournament =

- Format: Double-elimination tournament
- Finals site: James I. Moyer Sports Complex; Salem, Virginia
- Champions: Humboldt State (1st title)
- Runner-up: Nebraska–Kearney (1st title game)
- Winning coach: Frank Cheek (1st title)
- Attendance: 5,830

The 1999 NCAA Division II softball tournament was the 18th annual postseason tournament hosted by the NCAA to determine the national champion of softball among its Division II members in the United States, held at the end of the 1999 NCAA Division II softball season.

The final, eight-team double elimination tournament, also known as the Division II Women's College World Series, was played at the James I. Moyer Sports Complex in Salem, Virginia.

Emerging from the winner's bracket, Humboldt State defeated Nebraska–Kearney in a single game championship series, 7–2, to capture the Lumberjacks' first Division II national title.

== Bracket ==
=== College World Series ===
First Round
California (PA)	0
Nebraska–Kearney	4
Kennesaw State	12 ^{(5)}
Merrimack	1
Ferris State	1
Humboldt State	2
Alabama–Huntsville	3 ^{(8)}
North Dakota State	2

Second Rounda
Nebraska–Kearney	4 ^{(8)}
Kennesaw State	3
Humboldt State	4
Alabama–Huntsville	2
Second Round
California	7
Merrimack	0
Ferris State	3
North Dakota State	4

Third Round
Nebraska–Kearney	1
Humboldt State	3
Third Round
Alabama–Huntsville	8
California	2
Kennesaw State	3
North Dakota State	0

Semifinals
Humboldt State	2
Kennesaw State	1
Nebraska–Kearney	6
Alabama–Huntsville	0

Championship
Humboldt State	7
Nebraska–Kearney	2

== All-tournament team ==
- Holly Waller, 1B, Nebraska–Kearney
- Megan Cooper, 2B, North Dakota State
- Terry Marroquin, SS, Humboldt State
- Kathy Le, 3B, Kennesaw State
- Shelli Maher, 3B, Cal Poly Humboldt
- Stephanie Berry, OF, Alabama–Huntsville
- Jamie Peterson, OF, Humboldt State
- Tracy Porter, OF, Alabama–Huntsville
- Amanda Kelly, P, Nebraska–Kearney
- Jessame Kendall, P, Humboldt State
- Megan Keesling, C, Humboldt State
- Audra Thomas, C, Kennesaw State
- Terrisa Eckmann, DH, Nebraska–Kearney

== See also ==
- 1999 NCAA Division I softball tournament
- 1999 NCAA Division III softball tournament
- 1999 NAIA softball tournament
- 1999 NCAA Division II baseball tournament
