= 2002 NCAA Division II baseball tournament =

- Season: 2002
- Finals site: Paterson Field; Montgomery, Alabama
- Champions: Columbus State (1st title)
- Runner-up: Chico State (3rd CWS Appearance)
- Winning coach: Greg Appleton (1st title)
- MOP: Brian Baker, P (Columbus State)
- Attendance: 15,142

The 2002 NCAA Division II baseball tournament was the postseason tournament hosted by the NCAA to determine the national champion of baseball among its Division II members at the end of the 2002 NCAA Division II baseball season.

The final, eight-team double elimination tournament, also known as the College World Series, was played at Paterson Field in Montgomery, Alabama from May 25–June 2, 2002.

After losing their first game, Columbus State won five consecutive games and defeated Chico State in the championship game, 5–3, to claim the Cougars' first Division II national title.

== Bracket ==
=== College World Series ===
First Rounds; May 25–28, 2002	Second Rounds; May 27–29, 2002
Florida Southern	7
Kutztown	11
Kutztown	1
Chico State	6
UMass Lowell	2
Chico State	5
Bracket One
Florida Southern	2
UMass Lowell	7
Ashland	5
UMass Lowell	10
Delta State	5
Ashland	12
Ashland	6
Central Missouri State	8
Central Missouri State	7
Columbus State	3
Bracket Two
Delta State	5
Columbus State	6
Kutztown	3
Columbus State	6

Semifinals; May 31–June 1, 2002
Chico State	8
UMass Lowell	4
Central Missouri State	4	3
Columbus State	5	4

Championship; June 2, 2002
Chico State	3
Columbus State	5

== See also ==
- 2002 NCAA Division I baseball tournament
- 2002 NCAA Division III baseball tournament
- 2002 NAIA World Series
