= 1997 NAIA World Series =

1997 NAIA baseball tournament
- 1997 NAIA World Series
- Teams: 8
- Format: Double elimination Page playoff
- Finals site: Lewis and Clark Park; Sioux City, Iowa
- Champions: Brewton–Parker (1st title)
- Winning coach: Mike Robins
- MVP: Andy Kalcounos (3B) (Brewton–Parker)

The 1997 NAIA World Series was the 41st annual tournament hosted by the National Association of Intercollegiate Athletics to determine the national champion of baseball among its member colleges and universities in the United States and Canada.

The tournament was played, for the last time, at Lewis and Clark Park in Sioux City, Iowa.

Brewton–Parker (64–7) defeated Bellevue (NE) (43–16) in a single-game championship series, 8–4, to win the Barons' first NAIA World Series.

Brewton–Parker third baseman Andy Kalcounos was named tournament MVP.

== Bracket ==
=== Preliminary ===
First round Losers to Championship Bracket, Second Round
Cumberland (TN)	8
Mount Vernon Nazarene	4
Brewton–Parker	11
Dominican (NY)	1
California Baptist	8
Dallas Baptist	2
Bellevue (NE)	8
SE Oklahoma State	10

Second round Losers to Championship Bracket, Third Round
Cumberland	2
Brewton–Parker	3
California Baptist	9
SE Oklahoma State	4

Third round Both teams to Championship Bracket, Semifinals
Brewton–Parker	9^{(10)}
California Baptist	7

=== Championship ===
Second round Losers eliminated
Mount Vernon Nazarene	10
Dominican	0
Dallas Baptist	2
Bellevue	5

Third round Losers eliminated
SE Oklahoma State	6^{(10)}
Mount Vernon Nazarene	5
Cumberland	3
Bellevue	7

Semifinals; Losers eliminated
Brewton–Parker	8
SE Oklahoma State	1
California Baptist	1
Bellevue	3

Championship
Brewton–Parker	8	–
Bellevue	4	–

== See also ==
- 1997 NCAA Division I baseball tournament
- 1997 NCAA Division II baseball tournament
- 1997 NCAA Division III baseball tournament
- 1997 NAIA Softball World Series
