= Nova Southeastern Sharks softball =

Nova Southeastern Sharks
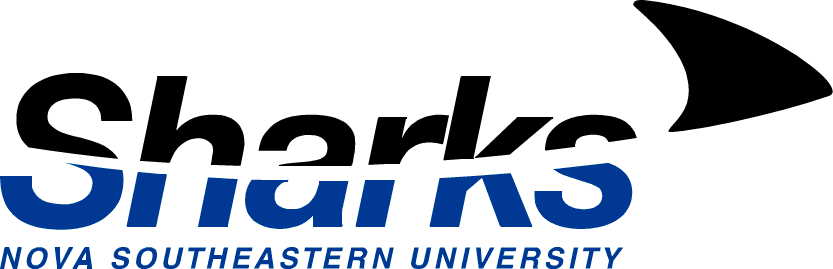
- University: Nova Southeastern University
- Head coach: Julie LeMaire (2nd season)
- Conference: Sunshine State Conference
- Location: Davie, Florida, US
- Home stadium: AD Griffin Sports Complex
- Nickname: Sharks
- Colors: Navy blue and gray

The NSU Sharks Women's Softball team represents Nova Southeastern University in Davie, Florida. They currently compete in the Sunshine State Conference.

== History ==
The NSU softball team is one of the most successful teams at the university. They won 6 NAIA national championships while in the Florida Sun Conference. They have since moved up to the NCAA and Division II. They are in the Sunshine State Conference and have not had the same success as when in the NAIA, but they have been improving each year. 2006, was the changing year for the team. It was their first official season after their probationary years. In 2006, Head Coach Lesa Bonee's fourth season at the helm of the Sharks, NSU began the year 5–0 before ending the year with a 22–28 overall record. NSU would finish the year in sixth place in the Sunshine State Conference, two spots better than the previous season. Junior utility player Katie Veltri starred for the Sharks, leading the team in batting average (.384), slugging percentage (.543), on-base percentage (.424), hits (58), RBI (31), doubles (13), home runs (3) and total bases (82). At season's end, Veltri was named to the All-Sunshine State Conference Second Team, as well as the NFCA All-South Region Second Team. Junior 2B Callie Binkley was named an All-SSC Honorable Mention after hitting .314 with 30 RBI and 18 stolen bases. The Sharks went 8–16 in SSC play, including conference series victories over the University of Tampa and Florida Tech. Junior Adrian Tuttle was NSU's workhorse in the pitcher's circle, going 13–14 with a 3.03 ERA and a strikeout-to-walk ratio of 2.02. Freshmen Valen Eberhard, Tranell Mesa and Katie Pepper all made significant contributions for the Sharks, giving NSU Softball a solid foundation going into 2007.

In 2025, the team started the season on a newly opened NSU Softball Stadium.

== Season-by-season results ==
Year	Coach	Record	Win %	Titles
1995	Robyn Handler	18–16	.520	
1996	Robyn Handler	27–20	.570	
1997	Robyn Handler	33–13	.710	National Champions
1998	Robyn Handler	49–7	.875	National Champions
1999	Robyn Handler	53–7	.880	National Champions
2000	Robyn Handler	38–21	.640	National Champions
2001	Robyn Handler	41–13	.750	National Champions
2002	Robyn Handler	34–17	.666	National Champions
2003	Lese Boneé	25–22	.530	
2004	Lesa Boneé	33–26	.590	
2005	Lesa Boneé	25–29	.460	
2006	Lesa Boneé	22–28	.440	
2007	Lesa Boneé	33–30	.520	South Regional Participants
2008	Lesa Boneé	43–20	.683	College World Series
2009	Lesa Boneé	49–13	.790	South Regional Participants
2010	Lesa Boneé	45–17	.726	South Regional Participants
2011	Lesa Boneé	32–20	.615	
2012	Lesa Boneé	33–22	.600	
2013	Lesa Boneé	27–26	.509	
2014	Lesa Boneé	30–20	.600	
2015	Lesa Boneé	20-25	.444	
2016	Julie LeMaire	12-39	.235	
2017	Julie LeMaire	27–24	.529	
2018	Julie LeMaire	21-29	.420	
Totals	1995–2018	770–504	.604	6 National Championships
