= Brewton–Parker Christian University =

Baptist Christian University in Mount Vernon, Georgia, US

Coordinates: 32°11′04″N 82°35′00″W

- Former names: Union Baptist Institute (1904–1912); Brewton–Parker Institute (1912–1948); Brewton–Parker Junior College (1948–1986); Brewton–Parker College (1986–2025)
- Type: Private college
- Established: 1904
- Religious affiliation: Georgia Baptist Convention
- Endowment: $13.3 million
- President: Steve Echols
- Faculty: 189
- Students: 1,119
- Location: Mount Vernon, Georgia, United States
- Campus: Rural, 280 acres (113 ha)
- Colors: Orange & Navy Blue
- Nickname: Barons
- Sporting affiliations: NAIA – SSAC
- Website: www.bpc.edu

Brewton–Parker Christian University is a private Baptist college in Mount Vernon, Georgia, United States. Brewton–Parker was founded in 1904 and is affiliated with the Georgia Baptist Convention.

== History ==
In 1904, John Carter Brewton, pastor of the McRae Baptist Church, and Charles Benton Parker, a prominent businessman in McRae, resolved to establish a private boarding school to serve elementary and high school students from Montgomery County and the surrounding area. As there were no public high schools at that time, the school played an important role in furthering the education of the area’s youth. The Telfair and Daniell Baptist associations were enthusiastic supporters. The school was placed between Mount Vernon and Ailey, as working together the town bid more support than any other community. The Union Baptist Institute, chartered April 28, 1904, joined with other Baptist associations, with Rev. Brewton as elected president of its board of trustees.

The co-ed Union Baptist Institute formally opened on September 12, 1905, with a four-building campus, serving 160 students in grades one through eleven. The school's first year was very successful and, as word spread, enrollment more than doubled to 365. In 1912, the school was renamed to Brewton–Parker Institute; it was accredited in 1918 by the Southern Association of Colleges and Schools.

Brewton–Parker Institute became a junior college after college freshmen and sophomore classes were added in 1923 and 1927. Elementary classes were removed in 1929. In 1948, high school classes were also removed. The school was renamed Brewton–Parker Junior College and transferred to the governance of the Georgia Baptist Convention. By the early 1980s, public two-year community colleges had been established throughout the state. At the same time, there was a greater demand for graduates of four-year colleges. In mind of these changes, the school evolved on December 9, 1986, into a four-year institution, Brewton–Parker College. In June 2025, Brewton–Parker College was granted university status and changed its name to Brewton–Parker Christian University.

=== Financial aid fraud ===
Scandal hit the college in the late 1990s over fraud in the college's financial aid department. A lawsuit against the college was brought about by Martha Faw, then the assistant director of financial aid. An investigation begun by the United States Department of Education confirmed that Pell Grants had been given to ineligible students, payments had been made to non-U.S. citizens, and guidelines for work-study programs were not followed. In 1998, Brewton–Parker College agreed to repay the government $4 million in what was said to be the largest qui tam recovery in Georgia history. College president Y. Lynn Holmes resigned.

David R. Smith became college president in 1998 and at his first graduation address he stated: "To any and all who recognized inept policies and errant behavior, and who continued to speak out against such things even in the face of opposition from those who preferred not to hear it, you should be applauded, not ridiculed." The college briefly outsourced the administration of their financial aid program until a new college policy and procedures manual was established in the Fall of 2000. A new position, Director of Financial Aid Compliance, was established.

== Campus ==
The main college campus is in Mount Vernon on 270 acres (109 ha) and includes forty-six buildings, outdoor athletic properties, and a 5-acre (20,000 m^{2}) lake.

== Organization and administration ==
Brewton–Parker is affiliated with the Georgia Baptist Convention. Its endowment was $13.3 million in 2007.

== Academics ==
Brewton–Parker Christian University offers undergraduate degrees in seven academic departments with 19 majors. Most of its programs have internships, offering practical, hands-on experience as well as academic content. Further, in applicable areas, undergraduates are encouraged to participate with faculty in performing research and presenting papers.

As the only independent college in rural southeast Georgia, the institution plays an important educational role in one of the state’s poorest areas. It serves many first generation college students and provides learning assistance to other, non-traditional students seeking to improve their knowledge and skills. Among private colleges, Brewton-Parker enrolls three times as many minority students as the national average.

There is a 2:1 female–male student ratio and a 15:1 student-faculty ratio. The student body is 73.2% Caucasian, 24% African American, 2% Hispanic, 0.5% Asian American or Pacific Islander and 0.3% Native American.

=== 2012 regional accreditation issues ===
In June 2012, the college's regional accreditor placed the college on probation. Two years later, the Southern Association of Colleges and Schools (SACS) voted to remove Brewton–Parker College from membership. The college appealed the decision and retained its accreditation during the process. In late 2014, the college successfully presented evidence of compliance with SACS standards; its accreditation was reaffirmed and its probation status lifted.

== Student life ==
Intramural sports include basketball, softball, table tennis, tennis, ultimate Frisbee, and volleyball. Student groups at the school include a concert choir, Voices of Truth, a concert band, Student Activities Council, Rotaract, Circle K, Alpha Omega Campus Ministry, Student Government Association, a Baptist Campus Ministry (Baptist Collegiate Ministries, a.k.a. BCM), campus-based Greek Life organizations, and Fellowship of Christian Athletes (FCA).

== Athletics ==
The Brewton–Parker athletic teams are called the Barons. The college is a member of the National Association of Intercollegiate Athletics (NAIA), primarily competing in the Southern States Athletic Conference (SSAC; formerly known as Georgia–Alabama–Carolina Conference (GACC) until after the 2003–04 school year) since the 1999–2000 academic year.

Brewton–Parker competes in 18 intercollegiate varsity sports: Men's sports include baseball, basketball, cross country, golf, soccer, track & field and wrestling; while women's sports include basketball, cross country, soccer, softball, track & field, volleyball and wrestling; and co-ed sports include bass fishing, competition cheer, eSports and Olympic weightlifting.

=== Baseball ===
The men's baseball team won the NAIA championship in 1997. The Brewton–Parker College Barons baseball team was declared co-champions of the SSAC Championship on May 3, 2010 and the Barons ranked as high as 15 nationally in that year. The Barons shared the title with then-No. 4-ranked Lee University Flames. The Barons won four straight games before losing to the Flames 8-0. They defeated Lee (46-11) in earlier rounds. The co-championship was declared when the deciding game was canceled due to inclement weather. Coach Greg "Boo" Mullins led the 2010 Barons Baseball team as head coach, and was named 2010 Coach of the Year by the Georgia Dugout Club.

=== Track and field ===
The Brewton–Parker College men's track & field team won the 2022 Indoor Conference Championship in the SSAC. In indoor track & field, Brandon Schultz won back to back National Championships in the 60 Meter Hurdles in 2021 and 2022 for the Barons.

== Notable people ==
- Dennis Holmberg, 1969, professional baseball player and manager
- Private Robert M. McTureous Jr., US Marine and Medal of Honor recipient
- Wallace Moses, professional baseball player
- Kim Ruff, Gospel singer-songwriter
