= Rose and Alfred Miniaci Performing Arts Center =

Coordinates: 26°4′47″N 80°14′33″W

The Rose and Alfred Miniaci Performing Arts Center is part of the Alvin Sherman Library, Research, and Information Technology Center on the Nova Southeastern University campus in Florida, USA. The theater is a 500-seat auditorium. It is equipped with state-of-the-art lighting and acoustics, as well as a satellite downlink for viewing broadcast and transmitted productions. The Broward Center for the Performing Arts is the managing partner of the theater and is assisting NSU to provide additional cultural programming opportunities for Broward County residents, university students and faculty members, especially in the central region of the county. Many quality productions have already taken place in the Center.

In January 2007, the Don Taft University Center, which is just south of the LRITC, opened a black box theater matching the layout of the Miniaci stage.
