= Don Taft University Center =

College sports venue in Davie, Florida

Coordinates: 26°4′40.6″N 80°14′37.0″W

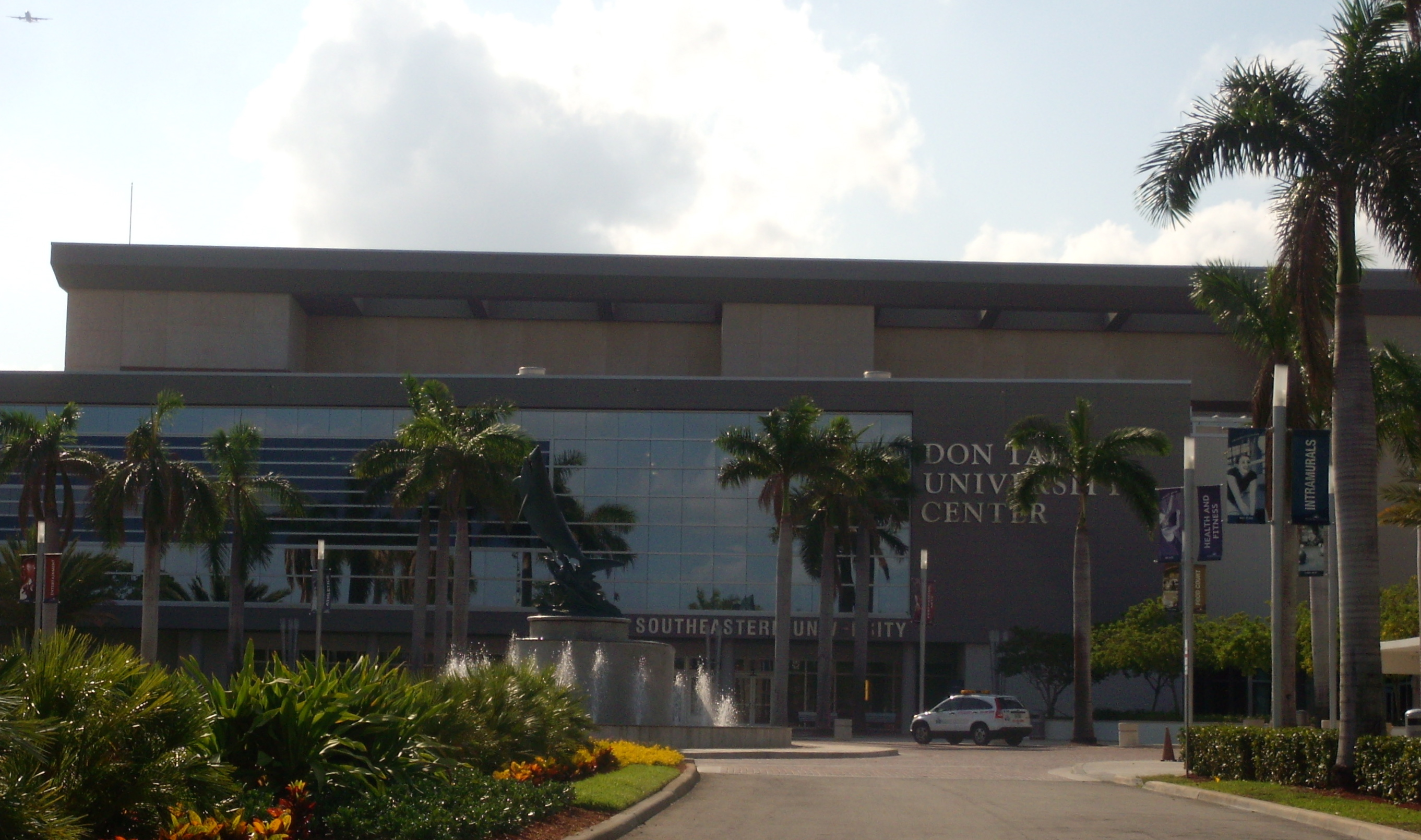
Exterior of The University Center

Nova Southeastern University’s 366,000 square-foot Don Taft University Center is a critical piece in the infrastructure of the university. It was constructed over a period of two years. The inaugural event hosted the comedian Jamie Kennedy on August 23, 2006. It provides a focal point for campus life. It is a venue where NSU's students, faculty and staff, as well as the community can enjoy guest speakers, concerts, sporting events, galas and other events.

== The Rick Case Arena ==
The Rick Case Arena is the main arena to NSU's NCAA Sharks basketball and volleyball teams, but it is also available for rental by outside groups. The venue holds many community events throughout the year, including local high school graduations, concerts, comedians, cheerleading competitions, Special Olympics, banquets, guest speakers, and sporting events. In 2025, the court was named to honor two time Division II champion men's basketball coach Jim Crutchfield.

In addition, modern sports medicine and athletic training facilities for NSU's 250 student-athletes are equipped with high-tech modalities including ultrasound, electrical stimulation, diathermy and a wide range of rehabilitation equipment, including the only HydroWorx aquatic therapy and fitness pool in the tri-county area.

The Rick Case Arena is being operated by the facilities management firm, SMG Management Inc.

== RecPlex Fitness Center ==
The University Center RecPlex replaces the former one, which was a converted double-wide trailer. The RecPlex is a cornerstone of the campus recreation department. Membership at the RecPlex is provided free of charge to current students. Faculty, alumni and the general public can join for varying costs. The new RexPlex contains:

- 98 pieces of StarTrac cardiovascular equipment
- 84 pieces of StarTrac strength equipment
- Two-court multipurpose gym for basketball, volleyball, badminton, dodgeball and more
- Three multipurpose studios to house group exercise and martial arts
- Three indoor racquetball courts and one convertible squash court
- Outdoor Swimming Pool (heated for the winter months)
- Indoor 27-foot (8.2 m) rock climbing wall
- Personal training and massage therapy
- Men's and women's lockers, showers and saunas

== The Flight Deck ==
The Flight Deck name originates from the fact that the land now occupied by NSU used to be the site of a Navy air base for World War II aircraft to practice taking off and landing on the short “flight deck” of US Naval carriers. It is also hard to miss the fact that NSU is directly under the flight path for Ft. Lauderdale International Airport. The Flight Deck includes a serving bar with a beer and wine license, low price snacks, pool tables, ping pong tables, large plasma TVs and an area to play video games. The Flight Deck hosts a variety of weekly activities, student events, happy hours and union sports. The Student Union sports program sponsors tournaments in 8-ball and 9-ball billiards, table tennis, darts, dominoes, spades and a sports quiz bowl. The Flight Deck is also a place for many student organizations to host special events. Flight Deck is managed by the Student Union.

== Performing and Visual Arts ==
The Arts Wing of the University Center houses the College of Arts, Humanities, and Social Sciences’ Department of Performing and Visual Arts. As part of its arts curriculum, the Division presents outstanding theatrical, musical, and dance productions; as well as visual arts exhibitions. These productions are often open to the public and serve as co-curricular opportunities for students to gain practical experience, and provide the NSU community with a local resource for educational and entertaining presentations.

This wing, housed in the north wing of the facility, officially open in January 2007. The facility includes, a 300-seat performance theater, a multipurpose black box theater with roll-out seating that matches the layout of the stage for the Miniaci Theater, a professional-caliber scene shop, and a gallery for the display of private art collections, photography and student artwork. Other amenities include choral and instrumental rehearsal rooms, six practice studios, and acoustic, percussion and keyboard technology labs.
