= Kim Ruff =

American gospel singer-songwriter

- Born: Vidalia, Georgia, U.S.
- Genre: Gospel Christian

Kim Ruff Moore is an American singer-songwriter and author.

== Early years ==
Kim Ruff Moore was born in Vidalia, Georgia. She studied at Brewton–Parker College in Mount Vernon, Georgia.

== Musical career ==
Ruff is a mezzo-soprano who has cited Kenneth "Babyface" Edmonds and Whitney Houston as musical influences. On June 26, 2009, Ruff released her debut solo album, Ready to Live. The album was nominated for New Artist of the Year and Contemporary Female Artist at the Stellar Awards, and won the Fan Favorite award for New Artist of the Year. Ruff wrote and co-produced the entire album. Ruff has been compared to songwriter Diane Warren for creating music with simple lyrics and melodies. Kim won a Stellar Award for fan favorite at the 25th Annual Stellar Awards 2010.

== Author ==
Ruff has published books across multiple genres including children's literature, self-help, faith-based, and personal finance. Her children's series include Suzzie Mocha and Pebo Pig. Other titles include Girl, Mash the Gas, Girl, Forgive Them and Move On, Cuffed, Marriage Releases God's Favor, Waymaker, and I Speak Life.

== Pageants ==
Ruff was crowned Miss Black Teen of Vidalia, Georgia in 1988.

== Personal life ==
Ruff was widowed after her husband of 27 years, Mack Ruff died of a pulmonary embolism. She has since married music producer and former Soul Stirrers member, gospel singer-songwriter Jeffery Moore. Together, they are members of the Gospel husband and wife duo group The New Consolers. Kim's son Spencer Carrington was born on November 3, 2001. Spencer is featured on her album singing a duet titled "Child of A King". He is also a singer-songwriter and is working on his debut album.

== Discography ==
=== Albums ===
Year	Album	Label	Awards
2009	Ready to Live	Mackim Records	Stellar Award
