= Casey Klunder =

American college baseball coach

Current position
- Title: Head coach
- Team: Wartburg
- Conference: ARC
- Record: 72–56 (.563)

Biographical details
- Born: Allison, Iowa, U.S.

Playing career
- 2003–2007: Waldorf
- Position: First baseman

Coaching career (HC unless noted)
- 2006–2021: Waverly-Shell Rock HS (IA)
- 2007–2008: Wartburg (assistant)
- 2022–2023: Central IA
- 2024–present: Wartburg

Head coaching record
- Overall: 103–103 (.500) (college); 386–185 (.676) (high school)

Accomplishments and honors

Championships
- IHSAA 3A (2015); A-R-C Tournament (2026)

Awards
- IHSBCA State Coach of the Year (2015)

Casey Klunder is an American baseball coach. He is the current head baseball coach at Wartburg College in Waverly, Iowa, a position he has held since May 2023. Klunder played college baseball at Waldorf College—now known as Waldorf University—in Forest City, Iowa.

== Coaching career ==
=== Waverly-Shell Rock High School ===
In 2006, Klunder took over as head baseball coach at Waverly-Shell Rock Senior High School (WSR) in Waverly, Iowa. He compiled an overall record of 386–185 as a Go-Hawk and led them to the schools first ever state baseball championship in 2015. During his tenure they also were ranked in the Iowa High School Baseball Coaches Association (IHSBCA) rankings for 14 straight years and reached as high as No. 1 on multiple occasions. After their state championship in 2015, Klunder was named the 2015 IHSBCA Coach of the year, and he had coached in the IHSBCA All-Star game in both 2010 and 2016. In his time with WSR they qualified for the state tournament four times, the last coming in his final season in 2021.

=== Central College ===
On August 3, 2021, Klunder became the 22nd head baseball coach at Central College in Pella, Iowa. The 2022 baseball season was his first at Central and first as a collegiate head coach. He started his tenure off with a 9–3 win over Wisconsin–Superior on March 8, 2023. They finished the 2022 season with a 16–23 record. In his second season with the Dutch, the team finished seventh in the American Rivers Conference (ARC), two places ahead of the 2022 season, with overall record of 15–24. Klunder resigned from his position as head coach on May 18, 2023, to become the new head coach at Wartburg College.

=== Wartburg College ===
On May 18, 2023, Klunder was named the 5th head baseball coach in program history at Wartburg College in Waverly, Iowa. He began his tenure at Wartburg with a 12–4 win over Grove City, with a 3–0 start to the year. He would finish is first season with a 23-19 record. In 2026, Klunder would return the Knights back to the NCAA tournament after winning the American Rivers Conference tournament. They won two games in the NCAA regional and would finish that season with a 28-17 record; the colleges best finish in 9 years.

== Head coaching record ==
=== College ===
Record table
| Season | Team | Overall | Conference | Standing | Postseason |
|---|---|---|---|---|---|
Central Dutch (American Rivers Conference) (2022–2023)
| 2022 | Central | 16–23 | 4–20 | 9th | |
| 2023 | Central | 15–24 | 8–16 | 7th | |
| Central: | | 31–47 (.397) | 12–36 (.250) | | |
Wartburg Knights (American Rivers Conference) (2024–Present)
| 2024 | Wartburg | 23–19 | 12–12 | 6th | A-R-C Tournament |
| 2025 | Wartburg | 21–20 | 12–12 | 4th | A-R-C Tournament |
| 2026 | Wartburg | 28–17 | 13–11 | 4th | NCAA Regional |
| Wartburg: | | 72–56 (.563) | 37–35 (.514) | | |
| Total: | | 103–103 (.500) | | | |
