= 2001 NCAA Division II baseball tournament =

- Season: 2001
- Finals site: Paterson Field; Montgomery, Alabama
- Champions: St. Mary's (TX) (1st title)
- Runner-up: Central Missouri State (2nd CWS Appearance)
- Winning coach: Charlie Migl (1st title)
- MOP: Jesse Gutierrez, 1B (St. Mary's (TX))
- Attendance: 12,580

The 2001 NCAA Division II baseball tournament was the postseason tournament hosted by the NCAA to determine the national champion of baseball among its Division II members at the end of the 2001 NCAA Division II baseball season.

The final, eight-team double elimination tournament, also known as the College World Series, was played at Paterson Field in Montgomery, Alabama from May 26–June 2, 2001.

St. Mary's (TX) defeated Central Missouri State, 11–3, in the championship game to claim the Rattlers' first Division II national title.

== Bracket ==
=== College World Series ===
First Rounds; May 26–29, 2001
SIU Edwardsville	9
Tampa	4
North Florida	9
Delta State	7
Tampa	11
Delta State	14
Kutztown	0
St. Mary's (TX)	3
UMass Lowell	13
Central Missouri State	5
Kutztown	0
Central Missouri State	5

Second Rounds; May 28–30, 2001
SIU Edwardsville	3
North Florida	7
UMass Lowell	2
Delta State	6
St. Mary's (TX)	12
UMass Lowell	1
SIU Edwardsville	4
Central Missouri State	7

Semifinals; May 31, 2001
North Florida	7
Delta State	11
St. Mary's (TX)	10
Central Missouri State	11

Elimination Semifinals; June 1, 2001
North Florida	5
Central Missouri State	8
St. Mary's (TX)	17
Delta State	4

Championship; June 2, 2001
Central Missouri State	3
St. Mary's (TX)	11

== See also ==
- 2001 NCAA Division I baseball tournament
- 2001 NCAA Division III baseball tournament
- 2001 NAIA World Series
