= Nova Southeastern Sharks women's rowing =

The NSU Sharks Women's Crew team represents Nova Southeastern University in Davie, Florida. They currently compete in the Sunshine State Conference.

== History ==
The Sharks had their debut performance in 2003–04 with coach John Gartin, becoming the first team to reach nationals in their inaugural competition. Jennifer Rembe, an athlete on the team, became NSU's first female NCAA All-American.

From 2005 to 2009, the Sharks won Florida's Conference Title, winning NSU's first NCAA Division II title in 2009. The program continued to perform well through the 2010s, making a total of 12 NCAA Championship appearances. In August 2020, the program was suspended due to budget constraints related to the COVID-19 pandemic.

In 2023, Nova Southeastern University announced the reinstatement of the women's rowing program. The team officially returned to competition in the 2024 spring season under new head coach Kim Chavers.

== Season-by-season results ==
Year	Coach	Crew	Record	Win %
2003	John Gartin	Varsity 8+	7-3	.700
2003	John Gartin	Varsity 4+	2–3	.400
2004	John Gartin	Varsity 8+	10-1	.900
2004	John Gartin	Varsity 4+	9-3	.750
2005	John Gartin	Varsity 8+	5-3	.625
2005	John Gartin	Varsity 4+	8-0	1.000
2006	John Gartin	Varsity 8+	7-2	.777
2006	John Gartin	Varsity 4+	7-2	.777
2007	John Gartin	Varsity 8+	10-0	1.000
2007	John Gartin	Varsity 4+	11-0	1.000
2008	John Gartin	Varsity 8+	13-0	1.000
2008	John Gartin	Varsity 4+	9-0	1.000
2009	John Gartin	Varsity 8+	11-0	1.000
2009	John Gartin	Varsity 4+	9-1	.900
Totals	2003–2008	Varsity 4 & 8	118-18	.868
