= Nova Southeastern Sharks volleyball =

The NSU Sharks Women's Volleyball team represents Nova Southeastern University in Davie, Florida. They currently compete in the Sunshine State Conference.

== History ==
=== 1980s ===
The women's volleyball team started in 1984 becoming a member of the National Little College Athletic Association (NLCAA). In 1985 joins the National Association of Intercollegiate Athletics (NAIA), becoming from 1985 to 1989 District 25 Championship.

=== 1990s ===
In 1990, NSU joins with seven other NAIA schools (Flagler College, Webber College, St. Thomas University, Embry-Riddle Aeronautical University, Palm Beach Atlantic College, Warner Southern College and Florida Memorial College) to form the Florida Intercollegiate Athletic Conference (FIAC). In 1992, The Florida Intercollegiate Athletic Conference is changed to the Florida Sun Conference (FSC) and Nova University is now a member of District 7. In 1993, the Nova University women's volleyball team finishes 30–9, while winning the program's first Florida Sun Conference Championship and first NAIA Southeast Regional Championship. In 1996, NSU volleyball player Sherri Waddell is named Florida Sun Conference Player of the Year, as the Knights go 27–6 and make an NAIA South Regional Tournament appearance.

=== 2000s ===
In 2002, NSU is granted full membership in the NCAA Division II and provisional membership in the Sunshine State Conference. In 2005, NSU unveils "Sharks" as the new nickname/mascot for the university and its athletic teams.

On August 25, 2006, NSU Volleyball hosted the first event in the new Rick Case Arena. Hosting the Sharks Invite.

Steve Wilcosky led the 2007 squad to a 26–10 record, losing in the 2nd round of the NCAA Tournament. He is named SSC Coach of the Year.

In 2008 the Sharks posted a record of 24-12 and won the NCAA South Region advancing to the Elite 8. Valeria Petrova and Emily Carle are named the programs first NCAA Era All Americans.

The next season, NSU recorded a 19–11 record and Valeria Petrova became the first 2x All American in School History after earning Honorable Mention Honors. That same season, Freshman Carly Perschnick was named the SSC Freshman of the Year and Honorable Mention All American.

In 2013 Jennifer King is named Head Coach and takes over a team coming off a 4–28 season. Three season later King leads the Sharks to a 19–12 record and is named Sunshine State Coach of the Year.

In 2017 Junior Denvyr Tyler-Palmer Leads the SSC averaging 4.99 Kills per set and is named Honorable Mention All American, the Sharks first all American in eight years.

In 2019 Brian Rosen is named head coach and finds immediate success, taking a team that went 6-24 the season before and going 20–11. In that season Junior outside hitter Ally Ford and Junior middle Alex Boone are named Honorable Mention All-American.

Due to the COVID-19 Pandemic the 2020 season was cancelled. In 2021 the Sharks came back in full force posting a 25–6 record earning the #3 seed at the South Regional in Pensacola, FL. The Sharks swept Alabama Hunstville in the 1st Round before falling to eventual regional Champion, University of Tampa in the 2nd Round. Three Sharks earned All American Honors in 2021- Alex Psoma (3rd Team); Marianna Fiocco (Honorable Mention) & Elizabeth Price (Honorable Mention).

In 2022 Kacie Ehinger is named head coach and qualifies for the Sharks second straight NCAA Tournament after posting a 19–12 record, highlighted by an upset of then undefeated #1 University of Tampa on September 17. The Sharks earned the 5 seed and fell to the eventual South Region Champion Barry Buccaneers in five sets. Freshman Taylor Stockman was named the SSC Freshman of the Year as well as Honorable Mention All American.

In 2023 the Sharks make their third Straight NCAA South Regional appearance, posting a 20–11 record highlighted once again by an upset of then undefeated University of Tampa on November 4. The Sharks were named the #6 Seed in the South Region and defeated #3 Embry Riddle in the first round in four sets. In the 2nd Round the Sharks Fall to #2 Lynn in four sets. Graduate Student Nadia Lindner was named the Sharks first ever SSC Player of the Year, as well as the first AVCA & CCA NCAA D2 South Region Player of The Year and the first 1st Team All American. Sophomore Taylor Stockman earned her second AVCA All American Award (HM) and became the second Shark in history to be named a two-time All American (Valeria Petrova).

== Year-by-year records ==
| Year | Coach | Record |
|---|---|---|
| 1985 | Arthur John-A-Kiem | 9–4 |
| 1986 | Arthur John-A-Kiem | 16–12 |
| 1987 | Arthur John-A-Kiem | 19–7 |
| 1988 | Jay Schultz | 17–8 |
| 1989 | Gary Groth | 11–8 |
| 1990 | Gary Groth | 10–12 |
| 1991 | Gary Groth | 12–8 |
| 1992 | Gary Groth | 16–14 |
| 1993 | Pegie Moran | 30–9 |
| 1994 | Pegie Moran | 30–10 |
| 1995 | Joanna Sahm | 24–8 |
| 1996 | Joanna Sahm | 27–6 |
| 1997 | Charyl Moran | 27–11 |
| 1998 | Charyl Moran | 16–15 |
| 1999 | Lori Rembe | 24–16 |
| 2000 | Lori Rembe | 21–15 |
| 2001 | Lori Rembe | 15–18 |
| 2002 | Lori Rembe | 9–19 |
| 2003 | Lori Rembe | 13–21 |
| 2004 | Michelle DeSantis | 4–29 |
| 2005 | Melissa Batie | 6–19 |
| 2006 | Steve Wilcosky | 11–20 |
| 2007 | Steve Wilcosky | 26–10 |
| 2008 | Steve Wilcosky | 24-12 |
| 2009 | Steve Wilcosky | 19-11 |
| 2010 | Steve Wilcosky | 8-19 |
| 2011 | Steve Wilcosky | 8-20 |
| 2012 | Steve Wilcosky | 4-28 |
| 2013 | Jennifer King | 6-21 |
| 2014 | Jennifer King | 13-15 |
| 2015 | Jennifer King | 19-12 |
| 2016 | Jennifer King | 12-19 |
| 2017 | Jennifer King | 6-21 |
| 2018 | Jennifer King | 6-24 |
| 2019 | Brian Rosen | 20-11 |
| 2021 | Brian Rosen | 25-6 |
| 2022 | Kacie Ehinger | 19-12 |
| 2023 | Kacie Ehinger | 20-11 |
| Totals | 1985–2023 | 602-541 |
