= NCAA Division II rowing championship =

American collegiate rowing tournament

- Association: NCAA
- Sport: College rowing
- Founded: 2002; 24 years ago
- Division: Division II
- No. of teams: 6
- Country: United States
- Most recent champion: Western Washington (10th)
- Most titles: Western Washington (10)
- Website: NCAA.com

The NCAA Division II rowing championship is the annual regatta hosted by the National Collegiate Athletic Association to determine the champions of women's collegiate heavyweight (or openweight) rowing among its Division II member programs in the United States.

The most successful program has been Western Washington, with nine titles.

The most successful conference has been the GNAC, producing 15 of the 23 champions. Similarly, the only two years a GNAC team was not in the top two at the least was 2013 and 2015.

The reigning champion is Embry-Riddle, which won its first ever team national title in 2025.

By the early 2020s, sponsorship levels for women's rowing in Division II had dropped to the point that the future of D-II women's rowing itself was in danger. In 2024–25, only 11 Division II members sponsored the sport, with three others adding the sport for 2025–26. Both numbers are well below the 35 programs needed for continued sponsorship of a D-II championship. The 2024–25 season was the first of a three-year grace period before the championship would have been discontinued. With that as a backdrop, legislation was proposed in 2025 that would exempt women's rowing (as well as women's field hockey, another sport that was in danger of dropping below the 35-program threshold) from the 35-program limit. If the proposal had not been approved, the D-II rowing championship would have been discontinued after the 2026–27 school year, and because Divisions I and III have their own championships, D-II rowing schools would have had no NCAA championship access. This legislation was approved by D-II members at the 2026 NCAA convention.

== Format ==
The NCAA Division II Women's Rowing Championships comprise 68 total competitors (86 including spares) and two events, varsity eights and fours. Four teams are selected, each of which is required to field an eight and a four. Two additional at-large schools are selected to field only an eight. The following criteria are used in selecting teams and individual boats:

- Regional ranking; regional championship results.
- Results against regionally ranked teams; results against teams already selected; results against common opponents.
- Head-to-head competition; late-season performance.
- Eligibility and availability of student-athletes.

=== Scoring ===
- Eights: 1st-12pts, 2nd-9pts, 3rd-6pts, 4th-5pts.
- Fours: 1st-8pts, 2nd-6pts, 3rd-4pts.

== Results ==
NCAA Division II Rowing Championships
Year	Site (Host Team)	Team Results				Individual Results		
Year	Site (Host Team)	Champion	Score	Runner-up	Score	Fours	II Eights	I Eights
2002; Details	Indianapolis, IN	UC Davis	50	Western Washington	45	Not held	UC Davis	UC Davis
2003; Details	Indianapolis, IN	UC Davis (2)	20	Western Washington	15	UC Davis	Not held	UC Davis (2)
2004; Details	Gold River, CA	Mercyhurst	18	Humboldt State	17	Humboldt State	Not held	Mercyhurst
2005; Details	Gold River, CA	Western Washington	20	Mercyhurst	12	Western Washington	Not held	Western Washington
2006; Details	West Windsor, NJ	Western Washington (2)	20	Barry	15	Western Washington (3)	Not held	Western Washington (2)
2007; Details	Oak Ridge, TN	Western Washington (3)	20	UC San Diego	15	Western Washington (4)	Not held	Western Washington (3)
2008; Details	Gold River, CA	Western Washington (4)	20	UC San Diego	15	Western Washington (5)	Not held	Western Washington (4)
2009; Details	Cherry Hill, NJ	Western Washington (5)	18	Mercyhurst	13	Nova Southeastern	Not held	Western Washington (5)
2010; Details	Gold River, CA	Western Washington (6)	20	Seattle Pacific	11	Western Washington (6)	Not held	Mercyhurst (2)
2011; Details	Gold River, CA	Western Washington (7)	20	Mercyhurst	13	Western Washington (7)	Not held	Western Washington (6)
2012; Details	West Windsor, NJ	Humboldt State	20	Western Washington	13	Humboldt State (2)	Not held	Humboldt State
2013; Details	Indianapolis, IN	Nova Southeastern	20	Barry	15	Nova Southeastern (2)	Not held	Nova Southeastern
2014; Details	Indianapolis, IN	Humboldt State (2)	16	Nova Southeastern	15	Western Washington (8)	Not held	Humboldt State (2)
2015; Details	Gold River, CA	Barry	20	Mercyhurst	15	Barry	Not held	Barry
2016; Details	Gold River, CA	Barry (2)	20	Central Oklahoma	15	Barry (2)	Not held	Barry (2)
2017; Details	West Windsor, NJ	Western Washington (8)	17	Central Oklahoma	16	Western Washington (9)	Not held	Central Oklahoma
2018; Details	Sarasota, FL	Central Oklahoma	18	Western Washington	14	Western Washington (10)	Not held	Central Oklahoma (2)
2019; Details	Indianapolis, IN	Central Oklahoma (2)	30	Florida Tech	23	Central Oklahoma	Not held	Central Oklahoma (3)
2020	Canceled due to COVID-19							
2021; Details	Sarasota, FL	Central Oklahoma (3)	20	Mercyhurst	15	Central Oklahoma (2)	Not held	Central Oklahoma (4)
2022; Details	Sarasota, FL	Mercyhurst (2)	30	Western Washington	19	Mercyhurst	Not held	Mercyhurst (3)
2023; Details	Pennsauken, NJ (Temple)	Cal Poly Humboldt (3)	30	Central Oklahoma	25	Cal Poly Humboldt (3)	Not held	Cal Poly Humboldt (3)
2024; Details	Bethel, OH (Marietta)	Western Washington (9)	22	Mercyhurst	21	Seattle Pacific	Not held	Western Washington (7)
2025; Details	West Windsor, NJ (Ivy & MAAC)	Embry-Riddle	26	Cal Poly Humboldt	24	Cal Poly Humboldt (4)	Not held	Embry-Riddle
2026; Details	Gainesville, GA (North Georgia)	Western Washington (10)	30	Cal Poly Humboldt	20	Western Washington (11)	Not held	Western Washington (8)
2027	Sarasota, FL (UCF)							
2028	Sarasota, FL (UCF)							

== Team champions ==
=== Active programs ===
Team	#	Years
Western Washington	10	2005, 2006, 2007, 2008, 2009, 2010, 2011, 2017, 2024, 2026
Cal Poly Humboldt	3	2012, 2014, 2023
Central Oklahoma	3	2018, 2019, 2021
Barry	2	2015, 2016
Embry–Riddle	1	2025
Nova Southeastern	1	2013

=== Former programs ===
Team	#	Years
Mercyhurst	2	2004, 2022
UC Davis	2	2002, 2003

== See also ==
- Intercollegiate Women's Varsity Eights
- Intercollegiate Rowing Association Women's Varsity Lightweight Eights Champions
- NCAA Division I Rowing Championship
- NCAA Division III Rowing Championship
