= Cal Poly Humboldt Lumberjacks =

- University: California State Polytechnic University, Humboldt
- Conference: CCAA (primary); GNAC (women's rowing); Independent (women's triathlon); MPSF (men's wrestling)
- NCAA: Division II
- Athletic director: Dr. Nick Pettit
- Location: Arcata, California
- Varsity teams: 13 (5 men's, 8 women's)
- Football stadium: Redwood Bowl
- Basketball arena: Lumberjack Arena
- Softball stadium: Humboldt Softball Field
- Soccer stadium: College Creek Soccer Field
- Nickname: Lumberjacks
- Colors: Green and gold
- Website: humboldtathletics.com
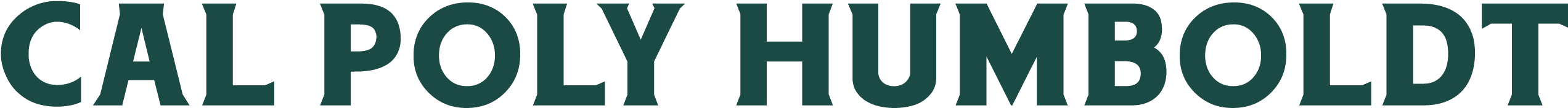

Team NCAA championships
- 6

The Cal Poly Humboldt Lumberjacks are the 13 varsity athletic teams that represent California State Polytechnic University, Humboldt, located in Arcata, California, in NCAA Division II intercollegiate sports. The Lumberjacks compete as an associate member of the California Collegiate Athletic Association for all sports except women's rowing, which competes in the Great Northwest Athletic Conference; women's triathlon, which competes unaffiliated; and men's wrestling, which competes in the Mountain Pacific Sports Federation.

== Varsity sports ==
Men's sports	Women's sports
Basketball	Basketball
Cross country	Cross country
Soccer	Rowing
Track and field^{1}	Soccer
Wrestling	Softball
	Track and field^{1}
	Triathlon
	Volleyball
^{1} – outdoor only

=== Basketball ===
Recently the men's basketball team achieved its first-ever West Region title and advancement to the semifinals of the NCAA Division II for the first time in the program's 81-year history.

The men's head coach is Chris Tifft, and the women's head coach is Michelle Bento-Jackson.

=== Rowing ===
The women's rowing team claimed the NCAA Division II national rowing championship title in 2012, 2014, and 2023. In 2012 they took first in both the varsity 8 and varsity 4 boats. In 2014 the varsity 8 was first, and the varsity 4 took third. In 2023 they swept every category, winning both the four and eight heats, as well as the four and eight finals. In 2011 the team finished third overall at the national championships, placing second in the varsity 4 and third in the varsity 8. The women's rowing program advanced both its varsity 4 and varsity 8 boats to the NCAA Championships in 2004, with the varsity 4 earning the individual boat national title and the varsity 8 placing second at nationals. In 2024 they finished in fourth, but needed one more point to tie for third, and three more points to tie for first. This likely was a result of Cal Poly Humboldt excelling in the heats, but falling short in the finals that year. Women's rowing became an intercollegiate sport at Cal Poly Humboldt in 1994.

==== Highlights ====
- 1994 Club Sport Emerges as an NCAA Division II Intercollegiate Team
- 2003 NCAA Division II National Championships ~ Finalist
- 2004 Division II National Championships ~ Finalist / National Champions 4+
- 2010 WIRA Team Champions
- 2011 NCAA Division II National Championships ~ Finalist
- 2012 NCAA Division II National Champions
- 2014 NCAA Division II National Champions
- 2015 NCAA Division II National Championships ~ Finalist
- 2017 WIRA Team Champions
- 2018 WIRA Team Champions
- 2019 WIRA Team Champions

=== Softball ===
CPH's softball team has qualified for the NCAA post-season 18 times between 1990 and 2008, capturing the national championship in 1999 and in 2008.

=== Track and field ===
The Lumberjacks have produced national champions and All-Americans in cross country and track and field. In 1980, the school's first year in Division II, the CPH men's cross country team claimed a national title. A year later, cross country runner Mark Conover earned the individual crown and later represented the US as a marathoner in the 1988 Summer Olympic Games. The women's track and field team, led by future 1928 Olympic sprinter, Elta Cartwright, won the 1926 national championship meet conducted in telegraphic form by the Women's National Collegiate and Scholastic Track Association.

=== Wrestling ===
The most recently added sport is men's wrestling, reinstated in 2024–25 after being dropped at the end of the 1988–89 season.

== Former sports ==
=== Football ===
Cal Poly Humboldt won the Great Northwest Athletic Conference in 2011 and 2015. The championship in 2015 led them to the Division II playoffs, during which they made it to the second round before losing to eventual champion Northwest Missouri State. The Lumberjacks played their home games in the Redwood Bowl.

Their biggest rivals in football were Western Oregon and Azusa Pacific. The university dropped football in 2018.

==== 2015 season ====
The 2015 season was one of the most successful in Cal Poly Humboldt history. The Lumberjacks won 10 games, 9 in the regular season, en route to a perfect 6–0 GNAC record, and the conference championship. For the first time in school history, CPH hosted an NCAA Division II home playoff game, played against Augustana University. The Lumberjacks defeated Augustana by a score of 45–31 to secure the first DII playoff victory since 1960. They lost their second round matchup with top seed and eventual champion Northwest Missouri State 54–7.

The season saw individual success as well, as running back Ja'Quan Gardner was named an All-American and finished as the runner-up in the Harlon Hill Trophy, the Division II version of the Heisman Trophy. Gardner rushed for 2,266 yards on 337 carries, both GNAC records. Gardner also led the country in rushing yards per game (188.8) and rushing touchdowns (25). Gardner won the GNAC Offensive Player of the Year award, and set a school record for single-game rushing yards by running for 305 yards against Azusa Pacific. Offensive Lineman Alex Cappa was named the conference Offensive Lineman of the Year award for the second straight season, and was a second-team All-American.

==== Conferences ====
- 1924–1939: Independent
- 1940–1996: Northern California Athletic Conference
- 1997: Division II Independent
- 1998–2000: Columbia Football Association
- 2001–2005: Great Northwest Athletic Conference
- 2006–2007: Division II Independent
- 2008–2018: Great Northwest Athletic Conference

==== Discontinuation of football program ====
In July 2018, the university announced that the football program would be discontinued after the 2018 season.

== Championships ==
=== NCAA appearances ===
The Cal Poly Humboldt Lumberjacks competed in the NCAA Tournament across 12 sports (5 men's and 7 women's), 113 times at the Division II level.

- Men's basketball (15): 1983, 1990, 2001, 2002, 2003, 2004, 2006, 2007, 2008, 2009, 2010, 2011, 2012, 2016, 2026
- Women's basketball (6): 1995, 2006, 2009, 2010, 2015, 2018
- Men's cross country (12): 1969, 1974, 1980, 1989, 1990, 1991, 1992, 1993, 1996, 1998, 2000, 2012
- Women's cross country (5): 1994, 1995, 1996, 2001, 2012
- Football (1): 2015
- Rowing (7): 2004, 2011, 2012, 2014, 2015, 2023, 2024
- Women's soccer (2): 1996, 2025
- Softball (24): 1990, 1991, 1993, 1994, 1995, 1996, 1997, 1998, 1999, 2000, 2001, 2002, 2003, 2004, 2005, 2006, 2007, 2008, 2009, 2013, 2014, 2015, 2016, 2017
- Men's indoor track and field (1): 2000
- Women's indoor track and field (2): 1995, 1999
- Men's outdoor track and field (27): 1965, 1967, 1968, 1969, 1970, 1971, 1972, 1973, 1974, 1981, 1982, 1983, 1986, 1989, 1990, 1991, 1992, 1997, 1998, 2002, 2006, 2007, 2008, 2009, 2011, 2014, 2018
- Women's outdoor track and field (15): 1988, 1990, 1991, 1992, 1993, 1994, 1995, 1996, 1997, 2001, 2006, 2007, 2008, 2010, 2017

=== Team ===
==== NCAA ====
The Lumberjacks earned six NCAA team championships at the Division II level.

- Men's (1)
  - Cross country (1): 1980
- Women's (5)
  - Rowing (3): 2012, 2014, 2023
  - Softball (2): 1999, 2008

Results

School year	Sport	Opponent	Score
1980–81	Men's cross country	UNC Pembroke	115–120
1998–99	Softball	Nebraska–Kearney	7–2
2007–08	Softball	Emporia State	1–0
2011–12	Rowing	Western Washington	20–13
2013–14	Rowing	Nova Southeastern	16–15
2022-23	Rowing	Central Oklahoma	30-25

==== Other national ====
- Women's Track & Field (1): 1926, at the highest level

Below is one national club team championship:

- Women's disc golf (1): 2014 (NCDGU)

=== Individual ===
Cal Poly Humboldt has had 39 athletes win NCAA individual championships at the Division II level.

NCAA individual championships
Order	School year	Athlete(s)	Sport	Source
1	1967–68	Gary Tuttle	Men's outdoor track and field	
2	1968–69	Bill Scobey	Men's outdoor track and field	
3	1968–69	Gary Tuttle	Men's outdoor track and field	
4	1971–72	Mike Bettiga	Men's outdoor track and field	
5	1972–73	Chuck Smead	Men's outdoor track and field	
6	1973–74	Frank Logan	Men's swimming and diving	
7	1973–74	Chuck Smead	Men's outdoor track and field	
8	1980–81	Mark Conover	Men's outdoor track and field	
9	1981–82	Mark Conover	Men's cross country	
10	1981–82	Dan Grimes	Men's outdoor track and field	
11	1984–85	Eric Lessley	Wrestling	
12	1990–91	Luke Parham	Wrestling	
13	1998–99	Trinity Davis	Women's indoor track and field	
14	2003–04	Jolie Smith; Winnie Bell; Jessica Lev; Lisa McDonnell; Melanie Rowsey	Rowing	
15	2011–12	Kaitlyn Shanle; Amanda Nelson; Shenae Bishop; Julia Smith; Ka'ena Sado	Rowing	
16	2011–12	Katie Lepley; Molly Fisher; Anna Wagner; Alex Torquemada; Ashley Frakes; Edi Sullivan; Jacki McPherson; Chyna Balonick; Katie Harris	Rowing	
17	2013–14	Jamie Larrabee; Ripley McChesney; Maggie Wilhelm; Kayley Weber; Maddy Guillaume; Samantha Morford; Katie Dedrick; Mariah Smihter; Katrina Rehrer	Rowing	
18	2016–17	Marissa McCay	Women's outdoor track and field	
