= Independence Community School District (Iowa) =

Public school district in Independence, Iowa, United States

Coordinates: 42.467450°N 91.908189°W

Location
- Independence, Iowa

District information
- Type: Local school district
- Motto: Start Here. Succeed Anywhere.
- Grades: PK-12
- Superintendent: Cynthia Phillips. EdD
- Schools: 4
- Budget: $32,021,794 (2025-26)
- NCES District ID: 1914580

Students and staff
- Students: 1,380 (2024-25)
- Teachers: 102.37 FTE
- Student–teacher ratio: 18:1
- Athletic conference: WaMaC Conference
- District mascot: Mustangs
- Colors: Maroon and White

Other information
- Website: www.indeek12.org

Independence Community School District is a public school district headquartered in Independence, Iowa. The majority of the district is in Buchanan County, and serves the city of Independence and surrounding areas including the towns of Brandon and Rowley.

Cynthia Phillips was hired as superintendent in 2023. Prior to becoming superintendent, Cynthia Phillips served as Executive Director of High School Education for the Cedar Rapids Community School District.

== Schools ==
The district operate four schools, all in Independence:

- Early Childhood Center (4-year-old Preschool & Early Childhood Special Education)
- East Elementary School (Junior Kindergarten - 2nd grade)
- West Elementary School (3rd grade - 6th grade)
- Independence Junior-Senior High School (7th grade - 12th grade)

== Athletics, Activities, & Fine Arts ==
=== Athletics ===
The Mustangs compete in the WaMaC Conference in the following sports:

Boys

- Baseball
- Basketball
- Bowling
- Cross Country
- Football
- Golf
  - Class B Team State Runner-Up - 1963
  - Class 1A Team State Champions - 1964
- Soccer
- Swimming & Diving
- Tennis
- Track & Field
- Wrestling
  - Class 2A State Champions - 1996

Girls

- Basketball
- Bowling
- Cross Country
- Golf
- Soccer
- Softball
- Swimming & Diving
- Softball
- Track and Field
- Volleyball
- Wrestling

Co-ed

- Cheerleading
- Strength & Conditioning

=== Activities ===
- Archery
- AV Tech
- Bass Club
- Battle of the Books
- Distributive Education Clubs of America (DECA)
- Family, Career, & Community Leaders of America (FCCLA)
- Future Farmers of America (FFA)
- Mock Trial
- National Honor Society (NHS)
- Robotics
- Silver Cord
- Student Council
- Yearbook

=== Fine Arts ===
- Speech
- Marching Band
- Concert Band
- Jazz Band
- Color Guard
- Choir
- Play
- Musical

== See also ==
- List of school districts in Iowa
- List of high schools in Iowa
