= Nova Southeastern University College of Arts, Humanities, and Social Sciences =

Part of Nova Southeastern University

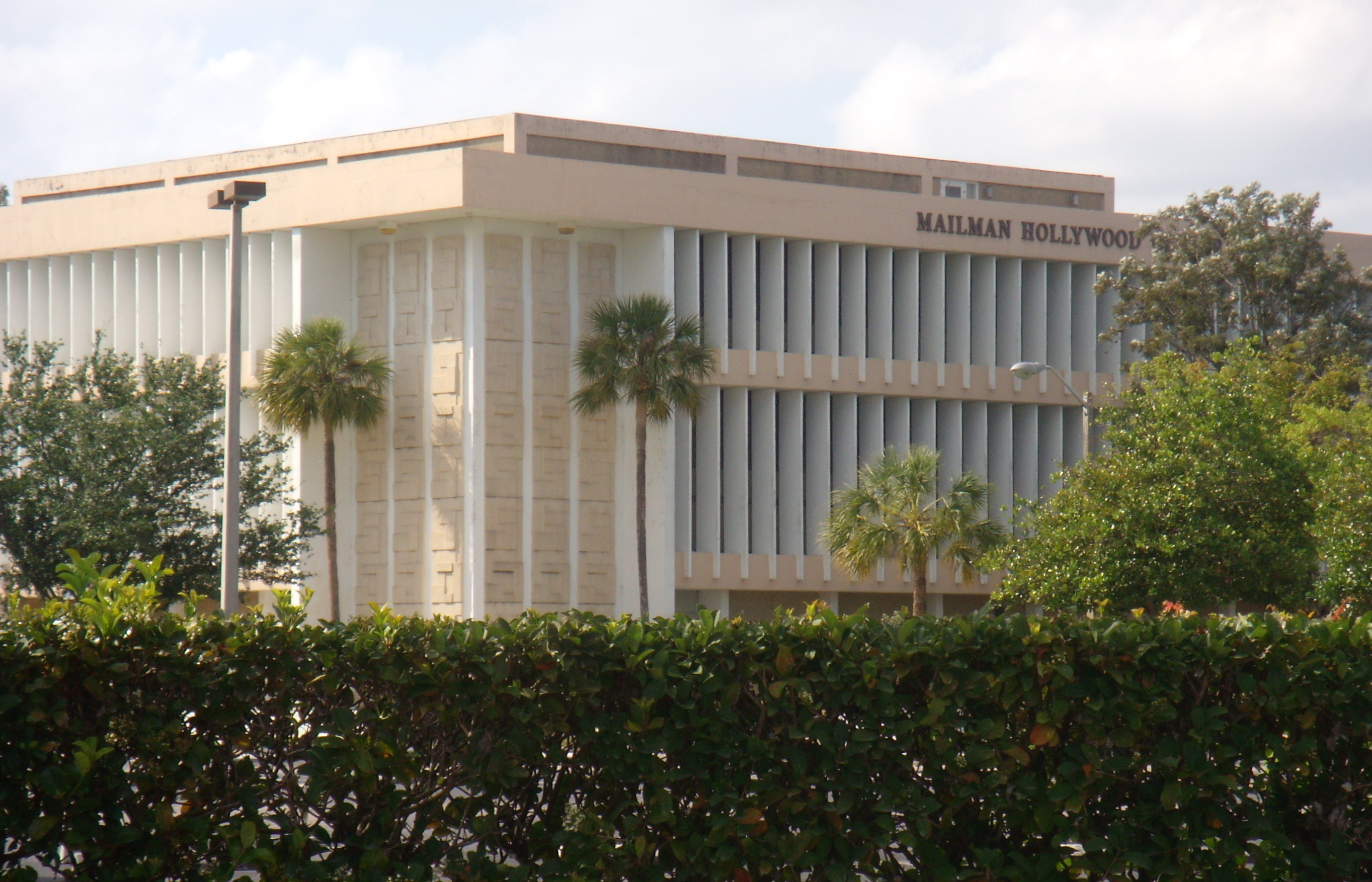
- Exterior of the Mailman-Hollywood Building, home of the College of Arts, Humanities, and Social Sciences
- Former names: Graduate School of Humanities and Social Sciences
- Type: Private research university
- Established: 2015
- Dean: Honggang Yang
- Location: Davie, Florida, United States
- Campus: Suburban 314 acres (1.27 km^{2})
- Website: cahss.nova.edu

The College of Arts, Humanities, and Social Sciences is part of Nova Southeastern University, which is a coeducational private nonprofit research university in Davie, Florida. The College of Arts, Humanities, and Social Sciences (CAHSS) is located in the Mailman-Hollywood Building on NSU's Fort Lauderdale/Davie Campus. The college's goal is to provide a better understanding of human social relations. It is a multi-disciplinary, multi-professional, and multi-cultural program. The vigorous curricula have deep interdisciplinary roots.

== Degree Programs ==
The college offers a number of bachelor's, master's, and doctoral degrees in multiple fields.

- B.A. in Art and Design
- B.A. in Communication
- B.A. in Dance
- B.A. in English
- B.A. in History
- B.A. in International Studies
- B.A. in Music
- B.A. in Philosophy
- B.A. in Political Science
- B.A. in Theatre
- B.S. in Applied Professional Studies
- B.S. in General Studies
- B.S. in Human Development and Family Studies
- B.S. in Legal Studies
- B.S. in Sociology
- M.A. in Composition, Rhetoric, and Digital Media
- M.A. in Cross-disciplinary Studies
- M.S. in College Student Affairs
- M.S. in Conflict Analysis and Resolution
- M.S. in Family Therapy
- M.S. in National Security Affairs and International Relations
- Ph.D. Conflict Analysis and Resolution
- Ph.D. in Family Therapy
- Professional Doctorate in Marriage and Family Therapy (DMFT)

== Facilities ==
The college is headquartered in the Mailman-Hollywood Building on NSU's Fort Lauderdale/Davie Campus. The Department of Performing and Visual Arts is located in the PVA Wing of the Don Taft University Center. The Department of Family Therapy and the Brief Therapy Institute are based out of the Maxwell Maltz Building.
