= 1997 NCAA Division II baseball tournament =

- Season: 1997
- Finals site: Paterson Field; Montgomery, Alabama
- Champions: Chico State (1st title)
- Runner-up: Central Oklahoma (1st CWS Appearance)
- Winning coach: Lindsay Meggs (1st title)
- MOP: Angel Diaz, C (Tampa)
- Attendance: 21,808

The 1997 NCAA Division II baseball tournament was the postseason tournament hosted by the NCAA to determine the national champion of baseball among its Division II members at the end of the 1997 NCAA Division II baseball season.

The final, eight-team double elimination tournament, also known as the College World Series, was again played at Paterson Field in Montgomery, Alabama.

Chico State defeated Central Oklahoma, 13–12, in the championship game, claiming the Wildcats' first Division II national title.

== Bracket ==
=== College World Series ===
First Round
Central Oklahoma	13
Central Missouri State	4
Kennesaw State	20
Slippery Rock	4
SIU Edwardsville	26
Adelphi	4
Chico State	25
SIU Edwardsville	5
Tampa	13
Adelphi	1
Central Missouri State	18
Slippery Rock	6

Second Round
Central Oklahoma	9
Kennesaw State	7
Tampa	14
SIU Edwardsville	4
Chico State	5
Tampa	3
Kennesaw State	7
Central Missouri State	4

Semifinals
Central Oklahoma	1	8^{10}
Tampa	18	4
Chico State	4
Kennesaw State	2

Championship
Central Oklahoma	12
Chico State	13

== See also ==
- 1997 NCAA Division I baseball tournament
- 1997 NCAA Division III baseball tournament
- 1997 NAIA World Series
- 1997 NCAA Division II softball tournament
