= 2005 NCAA Division III baseball tournament =

- Season: 2005
- Teams: 42
- Finals site: Fox Cities Stadium; Grand Chute, Wisconsin
- Champions: Wisconsin-Whitewater (1st title)
- Runner-up: SUNY-Cortland

The 2005 NCAA Division III baseball tournament was played at the end of the 2005 NCAA Division III baseball season to determine the 30th national champion of college baseball at the NCAA Division III level. The tournament concluded with eight teams competing at Fox Cities Stadium in Grand Chute, Wisconsin for the championship. Eight regional tournaments were held to determine the participants in the World Series. Regional tournaments were contested in double-elimination format, five four regions consisting of six teams and three regions consisting of four teams, for a total of 42 teams participating in the tournament. The tournament champion was Wisconsin-Whitewater, who defeated SUNY-Cortland for the championship.

== World Series ==
Fox Cities Stadium-Grand Chute, WI (Host: University of Wisconsin-Oshkosh/Lawrence University)

First round/elimination round 1	Second round/elimination round 2	Semifinals/elimination semifinals	Finals
Wisconsin-Whitewater	8
Trinity (CT)	3
Wisconsin-Whitewater	7
Chapman	6
Chapman	8
Wartburg	1
Wisconsin-Whitewater	10
Wooster	7
Rowan	10
Hampden-Sydney	0
Rowan	2
Wooster	8
Wooster	7
SUNY-Cortland	6	Wisconsin-Whitewater	11
SUNY-Cortland	4
Lower round 1	Lower round 2	Lower round 3	Lower final
Rowan	6
Trinity (CT)	1	Wartburg	8	Wooster	1
Wartburg	4	Wartburg	0	SUNY-Cortland	4
SUNY-Cortland	5
Chapman	12
Hampden-Sydney	6	SUNY-Cortland	15
SUNY-Cortland	9
