= 2002 NCAA Division III baseball tournament =

- Season: 2002
- Teams: 42
- Finals site: Fox Cities Stadium; Grand Chute, Wisconsin
- Champions: Eastern Connecticut State (4th title)
- Runner-up: Marietta

The 2002 NCAA Division III baseball tournament was played at the end of the 2002 NCAA Division III baseball season to determine the 27th national champion of college baseball at the NCAA Division III level. The tournament concluded with eight teams competing at Fox Cities Stadium in Grand Chute, Wisconsin for the championship. Eight regional tournaments were held to determine the participants in the World Series. Regional tournaments were contested in double-elimination format, five four regions consisting of six teams and three regions consisting of four teams, for a total of 42 teams participating in the tournament. The tournament champion was Eastern Connecticut State, who defeated Marietta for the championship.

== See also ==
- 2002 NCAA Division I baseball tournament
- 2002 NCAA Division II baseball tournament
- 2002 NAIA World Series
