= 1997 NCAA Division III baseball tournament =

- Season: 1997
- Teams: 32
- Finals site: Salem Memorial Ballpark; Salem, Virginia
- Champions: Southern Maine (2nd title)
- Runner-up: Wooster

The 1997 NCAA Division III baseball tournament was played at the end of the 1997 NCAA Division III baseball season to determine the 22nd national champion of college baseball at the NCAA Division III level. The tournament concluded with eight teams competing at Salem Memorial Ballpark in Salem, Virginia, for the championship. Eight regional tournaments were held to determine the participants in the World Series. Regional tournaments were contested in double-elimination format, with one region consisting of six teams, six regions consisting of four teams, and one region consisting of two teams, which was played as best-of-five, for a total of 32 teams participating in the tournament. The tournament champion was Southern Maine, who defeated Wooster for the championship.

== See also ==
- 1997 NCAA Division I baseball tournament
- 1997 NCAA Division II baseball tournament
- 1997 NAIA World Series
