= 2000 NCAA Division III baseball tournament =

- Season: 2000
- Teams: 42
- Finals site: Fox Cities Stadium; Grand Chute, Wisconsin
- Champions: Montclair State (3rd title)
- Runner-up: St. Thomas

The 2000 NCAA Division III baseball tournament was played at the end of the 2000 NCAA Division III baseball season to determine the 25th national champion of college baseball at the NCAA Division III level. The tournament concluded with eight teams competing at a new location at Fox Cities Stadium in Grand Chute, Wisconsin for the championship. Eight regional tournaments were held to determine the participants in the World Series. Regional tournaments were contested in double-elimination format, five four regions consisting of six teams and three regions consisting of four teams, for a total of 42 teams participating in the tournament, up from 40 in 1999. The tournament champion was Montclair State, who defeated St. Thomas for the championship.

== See also ==
- 2000 NCAA Division I baseball tournament
- 2000 NCAA Division II baseball tournament
- 2000 NAIA World Series
