= 1998 NCAA Division III baseball tournament =

- Season: 1998
- Teams: 40
- Finals site: Salem Memorial Ballpark; Salem, Virginia
- Champions: Eastern Connecticut State (3rd title)
- Runner-up: Montclair State
- MOP: Chris D'Amato (Eastern Connecticut State)

The 1998 NCAA Division III baseball tournament was played at the end of the 1998 NCAA Division III baseball season to determine the 23rd national champion of college baseball at the NCAA Division III level. The tournament concluded with eight teams competing at Salem Memorial Ballpark in Salem, Virginia, for the championship. Eight regional tournaments were held to determine the participants in the World Series. Regional tournaments were contested in double-elimination format, with four regions consisting of six teams and four regions consisting of four teams, for a total of 40 teams participating in the tournament, up from 32 in 1997. The tournament champion was Eastern Connecticut State, who defeated Montclair State for the championship.

== See also ==
- 1998 NCAA Division I baseball tournament
- 1998 NCAA Division II baseball tournament
- 1998 NCAA Division I softball tournament
- 1998 NAIA World Series
