= National Collegiate Rowing Championship =

The now defunct, short-lived National Collegiate Rowing Championship, often simply called the "Cincinnati Regatta," was a championship for men's and women's collegiate rowing, held in Cincinnati, Ohio, between 1982 and 1996. It pitted the winners of the Eastern Sprints, the Pac-10s, the Intercollegiate Rowing Association (IRA) National Championship and other crews invited at-large. The invited crews usually included Eastern Sprints and Pac-10 medalists, and Harvard and Yale. The IRA National Championship has been considered the men's national collegiate rowing championship since it was first held in 1895, though the NCRC served as the women's national collegiate championship until collegiate women's rowing was added to the NCAA.

The Cincinnati Regatta was founded as a way to popularize rowing in the midwest. After the creation of the NCAA Rowing Championship for women in 1997, the Cincinnati Regatta dissolved. Seven years later, Harvard and Yale returned to the IRA, the longstanding collegiate rowing championship regatta for men and, later, for lightweight women. The NCAA championship now holds this status for openweight women.

The winners of the men's Cincinnati Regatta were as follows:

- 1996 Princeton University
- 1995 Brown University
- 1994 Brown University
- 1993 Brown University
- 1992 Harvard University
- 1991 University of Pennsylvania
- 1990 University of Wisconsin–Madison
- 1989 Harvard University
- 1988 Harvard University
- 1987 Harvard University
- 1986 University of Wisconsin–Madison
- 1985 Harvard University
- 1984 University of Washington
- 1983 Harvard University
- 1982 Yale University
