= 1999 NCAA Division III baseball tournament =

- Season: 1999
- Teams: 40
- Finals site: Salem Memorial Ballpark; Salem, Virginia
- Champions: N.C. Wesleyan (2nd title)
- Runner-up: St. Thomas

The 1999 NCAA Division III baseball tournament was played at the end of the 1999 NCAA Division III baseball season to determine the 24th national champion of college baseball at the NCAA Division III level.

The tournament concluded with eight teams competing at Salem Memorial Ballpark in Salem, Virginia, for the championship.

The tournament champion was N.C. Wesleyan, who defeated St. Thomas for the championship.

Eight regional tournaments were held to determine the participants in the World Series. Regional tournaments were contested in double-elimination format, with four regions consisting of six teams and four regions consisting of four teams, for a total of 40 teams participating in the tournament.

== See also ==
- 1999 NCAA Division I baseball tournament
- 1999 NCAA Division II baseball tournament
- 1999 NAIA World Series
