= Stephen R. Smith =

American politician (1836–1889)

General Stephen R. Smith
- Born: August 28, 1836; Whitneyville, Connecticut
- Died: December 1889 (aged 53); New Haven, Connecticut
- Spouse: Mary Clough (1873–1889, his death)
- Military career
- Allegiance: United States
- Branch: United States Army
- Rank: Major General
- Commands: Connecticut State Militia; Second Brigade, Connecticut Militia

Stephen R. Smith (August 28, 1836 – December 1889) was born in Whitneyville, Connecticut, and was the twenty-fourth Adjutant General of the State of Connecticut. He was an active leader of the Republican Party; he served as an alderman and a councilman. He was also a Grand Marshal at the Grand Lodge of the State.

== Military career ==
In February 1858, Stephen R. Smith joined the New Haven Grays. On January 13, 1876, he was promoted colonel of the 2nd Regiment. On January 8, 1885, Smith was appointed Connecticut Adjutant General by Governor Henry B. Harrison.

== Personal life ==
Stephen R. Smith married Mary Cough on December 28, 1873. They had four daughters and two sons; Lizzie M. (1874), Irenel (1876), Ethel (1878), Frank I (1881–1881), M. Pearl (1883), and Claire L. (1887). Stephen R. Smith died in December 1889, in New Haven, Connecticut.

Military offices
Preceded by Darius N. Couch	Connecticut Adjutant General; 1885–1886	Succeeded by Frederick E. Camp
