= John Keyes (soldier) =

General John Keyes
- Born: October 24, 1744; Ashford, Connecticut Colony, British America
- Died: April 13, 1824 (aged 79); Canajoharie, New York, U.S.
- Spouse(s): Mary Wales; Mercy Scott
- Military career
- Allegiance: United States
- Branch: United States Army
- Rank: Brigadier General
- Unit: Knowlton's Rangers
- Commands: Connecticut State Militia
- Conflicts: American Revolutionary War; Battle of Harlem Heights
- Website: www.ct.gov/mil

John Keyes, son of Sampson Keyes, was the first Adjutant General of the State of Connecticut, being appointed to that position in 1782 and retiring from service in 1791. He also served in the American Revolution in the Continental Army.

== Military career ==
John Keyes was commissioned as a lieutenant in Knowlton's Rangers in 1776 by the unit's namesake, Colonel Thomas Knowlton. The Colonel was his brother-in-law through his sister, Anna Keyes. Under Knowlton, he fought in the American Revolution. He was present at the Battle of Harlem Heights, where Knowlton fell in battle. Along with other members of the unit, Keyes was one of the first military intelligence operatives in the American Army, where he achieved the rank of captain.

After the war, Keyes was promoted to brigadier major and was appointed as the first adjutant general of the State of Connecticut the following year. The position was officially established by Connecticut law in 1784, and he held the office until 1791.

== Personal life ==
John Keyes married Mary Wales on September 28, 1767. Mary was the daughter of Elisha and Mary (Abbe) Wales. Together, they had five children: Clarissa (1758–1846), Elnathan (1770–1853), Laura, Zachariah (1778–1834), and Almira (1785–1842). After his military career, the family moved to Vermont and later Canajoharie, NY, where he obtained a grant of land. His wife, Mary, died on September 11, 1806, and John remarried on October 18, 1807, to Mercy Scott (1748–1860). John died on April 13, 1824, in the State of New York.

Military offices
| Preceded by Position Established | Connecticut Adjutant General; 1782 - 1791 | Succeeded by Ebenezer Huntington |
