= Ebenezer Huntington =

18th/19th-century American politician

Major General Ebenezer Huntington
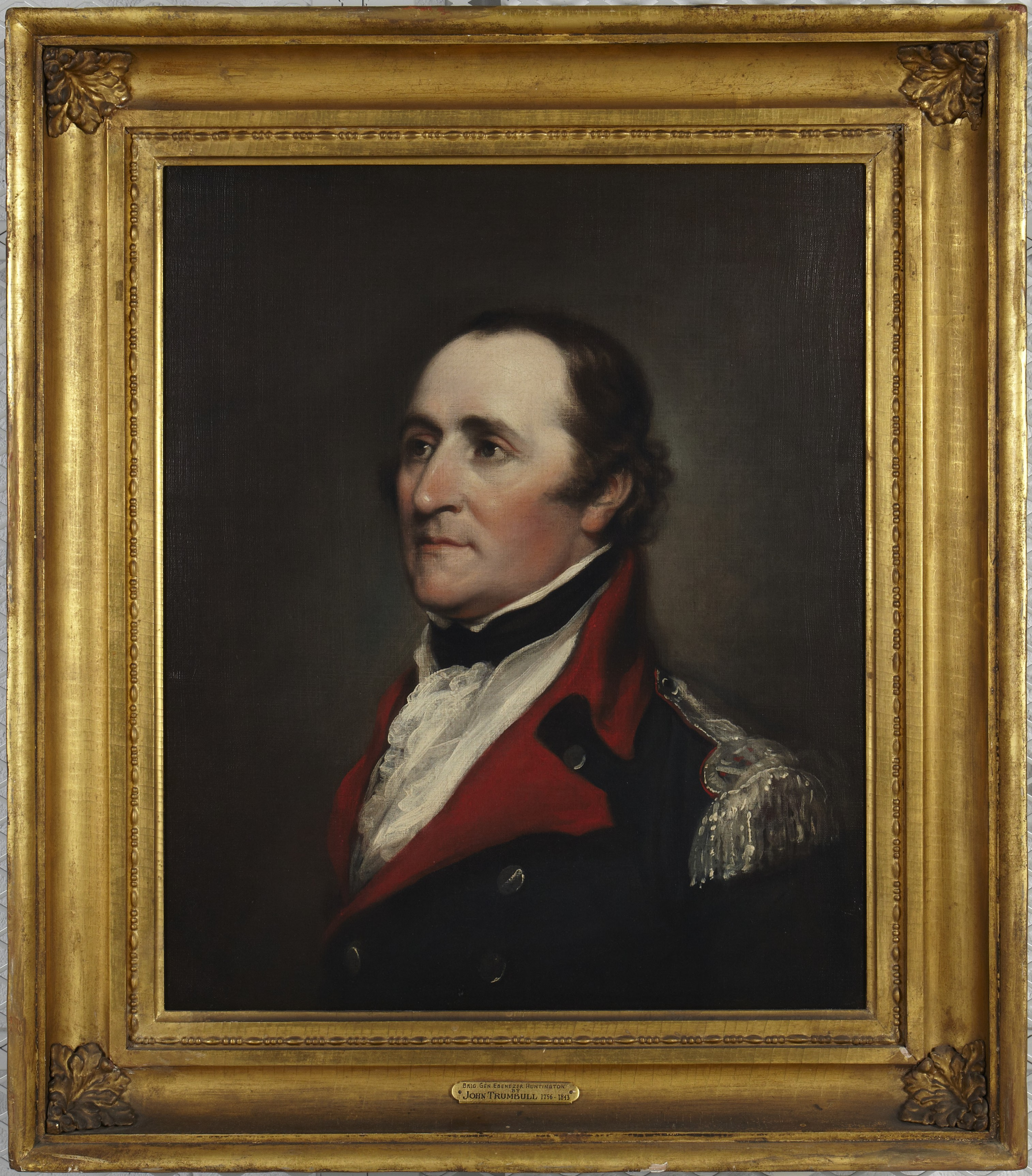
- Portrait by John Trumbull, 1806

Member of the U.S. House of Representatives from Connecticut's at-large district
- In office October 11, 1810 – March 3, 1811
- Preceded by: Samuel W. Dana
- Succeeded by: Lyman Law
- In office March 4, 1817 – March 3, 1819
- Preceded by: Lyman Law
- Succeeded by: Henry W. Edwards

Personal details
- Born: December 26, 1754 Norwich, Connecticut Colony, British America
- Died: June 17, 1834 (aged 79) Norwich, Connecticut, U.S.
- Party: Federalist
- Spouse(s): Sarah Isham; Lucretia Mary McClellan
- Education: Yale College; Harvard College
- Website: www.ct.gov/mil

Military service
- Allegiance: United States
- Branch/service: Continental Army; United States Army
- Years of service: 1775–1783; 1798–1800
- Rank: Lieutenant Colonel (Continental Army); Brigadier General (US Army)
- Unit: 2nd Connecticut Regiment
- Commands: Connecticut State Militia
- Battles/wars: American Revolutionary War; Siege of Boston; Battle of Long Island; Battle of Rhode Island; Battle of Springfield; Siege of Yorktown

Ebenezer Huntington (December 26, 1754 – June 17, 1834) was an officer in the Continental Army during the American Revolutionary War, and afterwards United States Representative from Connecticut.

== Early life ==
Ebenezer was born on December 26, 1754, in Norwich in the Connecticut Colony to Jabez and Hannah (Williams) Huntington. His brothers were Joshua (who also served during the Revolution) and Zachariah. His half-brothers were Jedediah and Andrew, whose mother Elizabeth (Backus) Huntington died in 1746. The Backuses were a prominent family from the area whose heirs would found Backus Hospital.

Ebenezer attended Yale College, leaving without permission on April 21, 1775. After communication with the college, he would receive his degree on August 8 of the same year. He would later receive an honorary Bachelor of Arts from Harvard College and in 1785, Master of Arts from both colleges.

== Military service ==
After leaving Yale, Ebenezer arrived in Boston, where he received an appointment as a first lieutenant in Captain Chester's Company of General Joseph's 2nd Connecticut Regiment. He participated in the Siege of Boston until its close, when he marched with General Washington to New York. In May 1776, he was promoted to captain and fought in the Battle of Long Island on August 27 under Colonel Samuel Wyllys. By the end of the battle, he was promoted to brigade major under Brigadier General Samuel Holden Parsons. The regiment suffered significant casualties in Long Island.

On October 26, 1776, he was temporarily promoted to Deputy Adjutant General under Major General Heath in defense of the Highlands and also served as Deputy Paymaster. In January 1777 he was promoted to major of Webb's Additional Continental Regiment which was part of Major General Israel Putnam's division. During the summer of 1778, he participated in the Battle of Rhode Island, where he took temporary command of the regiment. He was promoted to lieutenant colonel of the regiment in October 1778. Under his command, the unit fought in the Battle of Springfield in 1780 in New Jersey.

Now a lieutenant colonel, he was given command of a light infantry regiment and marched with Washington to Yorktown, where he witnessed the surrender of Cornwallis. He is represented in the painting by John Trumbull as one of the American officers. He remained on duty with his troops until the unit was disbanded in May 1783 and was admitted shortly thereafter as an original member of The Society of the Cincinnati in the state of Connecticut.

== After the war ==
Ebenezer Huntington retired from the Army to pursue a career in merchandise. But in 1792, he was appointed a general by the Governor of Connecticut, Samuel Huntington, to be the Adjutant General after Congress passed an act in 1792 authorizing the states to maintain a militia. He held the position for the next 30 years under seven different governors.

On July 19, 1798, he was commissioned a brigadier general in the United States Army when it was expanded during the Quasi War with France. He was discharged on June 15, 1800, when the Army was reduced at the end of hostilities.

== Political career ==
Concurrently, while serving as the state's Adjutant General, Ebenezer twice served as a member of the United States House of Representatives in Connecticut's At-large congressional district. His first tenure was for less than five months when he filled the vacancy created when Samuel W. Dana was appointed to the United States Senate to complete the term of James Hillhouse who had resigned. He would serve again as the at-large congressman five years later, when he was elected as a Federalist in November 1816, beginning his term on March 4, 1817. He would only serve one term.

== Personal life ==
Ebenezer Huntington was married twice. He first married Sarah Isham of Colchester on December 10, 1791, with whom he had one son, Alfred Isham Huntington. Sarah died in 1793. Ebenezer married Lucretia Mary McClellan of Woodstock on October 7, 1795. They had nine children: Wolcott (b. August 20, 1796), Louisa Mary (b. February 20, 1798), George Washington (b, November 22, 1799), Nancy (b. April 6, 1803), Walter (b. November 11, 1804), Sarah (b. May 1, 1806), Elizabeth (b. August 24, 1808) and Maria (b. December 13, 1810). Lucretia died on November 5, 1819.

General Huntington died on June 17, 1834.

== Dates of rank ==
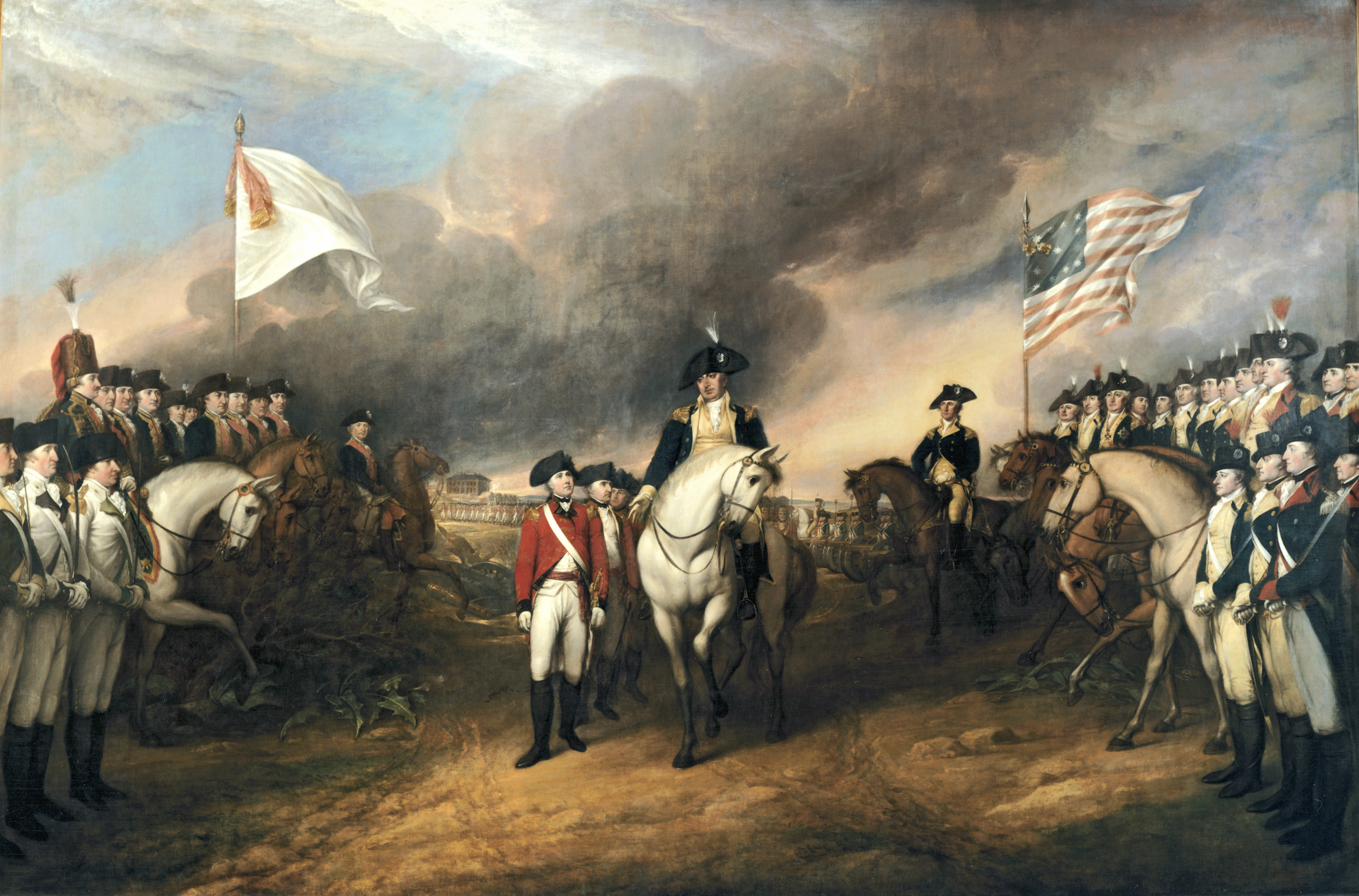
Ebenezer Huntington is depicted as one of the officers of General Washington's Army in John Trumbull's Surrender of Lord Cornwallis

- 1st Lieutenant, 2nd Connecticut Regiment - September 8, 1775
- 1st Lieutenant, 22nd Continental Regiment - January 1, 1776
- Captain, 22nd Continental Regiment - May 1776
- Brigade Major to Brigadier General Parsons - August 1776
- Major, Webb's Additional Continental Regiment - January 1, 1777
- Lieutenant Colonel, Webb's Additional Continental Regiment - October 10, 1778
- Lieutenant Colonel, 3rd Connecticut Regiment - January 1, 1781
- Lieutenant Colonel, 1st Connecticut Regiment - January 1, 1783
- Lieutenant Colonel, Swift's Connecticut Battalion - June 1783
- Retired - November 3, 1783
- Brigadier General, United States Army - July 19, 1798
- Resigned - June 15, 1800

U.S. House of Representatives
Preceded by Samuel W. Dana	U.S. Representative from Connecticut (at large); October 11, 1810 – March 3, 1811	Succeeded by Lyman Law
Preceded by Lyman Law	U.S. Representative from Connecticut (at large); March 4, 1817 – March 3, 1819	Succeeded by Henry W. Edwards
Military offices
Preceded by John Keyes	Connecticut Adjutant General; 1792–1822	Succeeded by George Cowles
