= Thaddeus J. Martin =

United States Air Force general

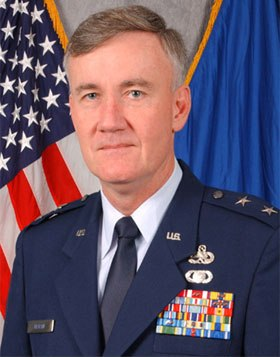
- Major General Martin
- Born: July 4, 1956 (age 70)
- Military career
- Allegiance: United States; State of Connecticut
- Branch: United States Air Force
- Service years: 1 October 1980 – 30 June 2018 −37 years, 8 months and 29 days
- Rank: Major general
- Commands: Connecticut National Guard; 103d Maintenance Squadraon; 103d Logistics Group

Major General Thaddeus J. Martin (born July 4, 1956) is a retired American military officer and former adjutant general of the Connecticut National Guard until June 30, 2018. He began his military service in 1977. He was commissioned, through Officer Training School in 1980 and completed formal training as an aircraft maintenance officer. Through his twelve years of active service, General Martin held several squadron and wing-level assignments and completed a MAJCOM headquarters tour. Joining the Connecticut Air National Guard in 1990, he held command positions at the squadron, group and wing level and completed a statutory tour with the National Guard Bureau. Prior to his assignment as the adjutant general, Martin served as the assistant adjutant general for the Connecticut Air National Guard.

As adjutant general for the Connecticut National Guard, he was responsible to the governor and the chief of the National Guard Bureau for providing operationally trained, equipped and mission-ready forces to support both U.S. mobilization requirements and state emergency operations to include developing and coordinating counter terrorism and domestic preparedness contingencies for the State of Connecticut. He implements policies, programs, and plans as the direct link to all state assigned National Guard resources, providing information and evaluation, issue resolution and action recommendations.

With the retirement of Major General Francis D. Vavala of the Delaware National Guard on January 31, 2017, Martin was the most senior adjutant general in the nation. He was also the third longest-serving adjutant general in Connecticut history behind George M. Cole and Frederick G. Reincke. He retired effective June 30, 2018, after 13 years of service as the adjutant general of the State of Connecticut.

== Education ==
1979 Bachelor of Arts, Management, Park College, Parkville, Missouri
1985 Master of Public Administration, Golden Gate University, San Francisco, California
1999 Air War College, Maxwell Air Force Base, Montgomery, Alabama

== Assignments ==
- July 1980 – October 1980, officer candidate, Officer Training School, Lackland Air Force Base, Texas
- October 1980 – April 1981, student, Aircraft Maintenance Officer Course, Chanute Air Force Base, Illinois
- April 1981 – September 1981, assistant maintenance supervisor, 509th Organizational Maintenance Squadron, Pease Air Force Base, New Hampshire
- September 1981 – July 1983, officer in charge, FB-111A Bomber Branch, 509th Organizational Maintenance Squadron, Pease Air Force Base, New Hampshire
- July 1983 – September 1983, assistant maintenance supervisor, 9th Field Maintenance Squadron, Beale Air Force Base, California
- September 1983 – March 1985, officer in charge of maintenance job control, 9th Strategic Reconnaissance Wing, Beale Air Force Base, California
- March 1985 – July 1985, chief of maintenance control, 9th Strategic Reconnaissance Wing, Beale Air Force Base, California
- July 1985 – August 1985, assistant deputy commander for maintenance production, 9th Strategic Reconnaissance Wing, Beale Air Force Base, California
- August 1985 – April 1987, reconnaissance systems acquisition manager, Headquarters Strategic Air Command/LGXR, Offutt Air Force Base, Nebraska
- April 1987 – August 1987, chief of Reconnaissance Systems Branch, Headquarters Strategic Air Command/LGXR, Offutt Air Force Base, Nebraska
- August 1987 – December 1989, assistant professor of aerospace studies, AFROTC Detachment 850, University of Utah, Salt Lake City, Utah
- December 1989 – February 1990, admission liaison officer, 9001 Air Reserve Squadron, Lowry Air Force Base, Colorado
- February 1990 – September 1991, chief of supply, 103rd Resource Management Squadron, Bradley Air National Guard Base, Connecticut
- September 1991 – September 1993, F-16 weapon system manager, Air National Guard Readiness Center/LGM, Andrews Air Force Base, Maryland
- September 1993 – August 1994, chief of maintenance, 103rd Consolidated Aircraft Maintenance Squadron, Bradley Air National Guard Base, Connecticut
- August 1994 – January 1996, commander, 103rd Maintenance Squadron, Bradley Air National Guard Base, Connecticut
- January 1996 – June 2000, commander, 103rd Logistics Group, Bradley Air National Guard Base, Connecticut
- June 2000 – March 2003, vice wing commander, 103rd Fighter Wing, Bradley Air National Guard Base, Connecticut
- May 2003 – May 2005, assistant adjutant general – Air, Joint Forces Headquarters – Connecticut, Hartford, Connecticut
- May 2005 – June 2018, adjutant general – Connecticut, Hartford, Connecticut

== Awards and decorations ==
Legion of Merit
Meritorious Service Medal with two bronze oak leaf clusters
Air Force Commendation Medal with two bronze oak leaf clusters
Air Force Achievement Medal
Air Force Outstanding Unit Award with 4 bronze oak leaf clusters
Air Force Organizational Excellence Award
Air Force Good Conduct Medal
National Defense Service Medal with bronze service star
Armed Forces Expeditionary Medal
Armed Forces Service Medal
Basic Training Honor Graduate Ribbon
Air Force Longevity Service Award with silver oak leaf cluster
Armed Forces Reserve Medal with bronze hourglass, M device and numeral 2
Small Arms Expert Marksmanship Ribbon
Air Force Training Ribbon with bronze oak leaf cluster
NATO Medal

== Effective dates of promotion ==
Promotions
Insignia	Rank	Date
	Major general	April 26, 2007
	Brigadier general	February 6, 2004
	Colonel	March 30, 2000
	Lieutenant colonel	April 13, 1996
	Major	April 23, 1990
	Captain	October 1, 1984
	First lieutenant	October 1, 1982
	Second lieutenant	October 1, 1980

Military offices
Preceded by William A. Cugno	Connecticut Adjutant General; May 1, 2005 – June 30, 2018	Succeeded by Francis J. Evon, Jr.
