= Edward Harland (general) =

American general (1832–1915)

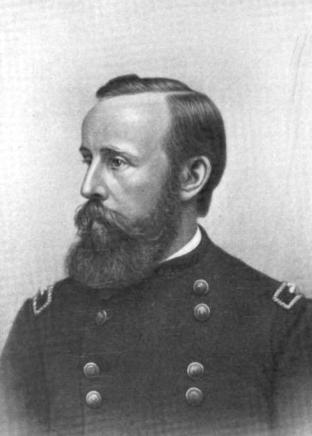
- Born: June 24, 1832; Norwich, Connecticut
- Died: March 9, 1915 (aged 82); Norwich, Connecticut
- Burial place: Yantic Cemetery, Norwich, Connecticut
- Military career
- Allegiance: United States of America; Union
- Branch: United States Army; Union Army
- Service years: 1861–1865
- Rank: Brigadier General
- Commands: 8th Connecticut Infantry Regiment
- Conflicts: American Civil War; First Battle of Bull Run; Battle of Roanoke Island; Battle of New Bern; Battle of Fort Macon; Battle of South Mountain; Battle of Antietam; Battle of Fredericksburg; Siege of Suffolk; Battle of Wyse Fork
- Other work: Lawyer, Connecticut legislator, Judge, Banker

Edward Harland (June 24, 1832 – March 9, 1915) was a Union general during the American Civil War. He was associated with early battles of the IX Corps as well as Union involvement in North Carolina and the Tidewater region of Virginia.

== Early life ==
Harland was born in Norwich, Connecticut, and graduated from Yale University in 1853. He was admitted to the bar and was practicing law prior to the Civil War.

== Civil War ==
In 1861 Harland became a captain in the 3rd Connecticut Volunteer Infantry and fought at the First Battle of Bull Run. On October 5, 1861, he was appointed colonel of the 8th Connecticut Infantry and served in Ambrose E. Burnside's North Carolina Expedition. In July 1862 he returned to Virginia with Burnside where his regiment became part of the newly formed IX Corps. Harland was placed in command of the 2nd Brigade, 3rd Division, IX Corps and led it at the battles of South Mountain and Antietam.

At the Battle of Antietam, Harland's brigade participated in the actions around Burnside Bridge and Antietam Creek. His division commander, Brig. Gen. Isaac P. Rodman, was sent on a flanking maneuver across Snavely's Ford. Around 1 p.m. Rodman's troops were eventually able to cross the ford and flank the Confederates under Robert Toombs. As the division moved toward Sharpsburg, General Rodman was mortally wounded and removed from the field. Harland, being the senior ranking colonel, assumed command of the 3rd Division.

Harland remained in command of the division until he was replaced by Brig. Gen. George W. Getty. Harland returned to command the 2nd Brigade and led it at the Battle of Fredericksburg. Sometime after Fredericksburg, Harland was promoted to brigadier general of volunteers, effective November 29, 1862. In March 1863 Getty's division was sent to the VII Corps in the Tidewater region of Virginia. Harland's brigade now became the 2nd Brigade, 2nd Division, VII Corps during the siege of Suffolk. After the Confederates lifted the siege, Harland was transferred to the XVIII Corps in North Carolina for the second half of 1863. He commanded the Sub-district of Pamlico for a short time before he was assigned to command the Defenses of New Bern in July 1864. He remained in command at New Bern until January 1865 when Union forces under Maj. Gen. John M. Schofield were moving inland from Wilmington, North Carolina, to link up with the armies of Maj. Gen. William T. Sherman. Harland’s forces became the 1st Brigade, 1st Division in Maj. Gen. Jacob D. Cox's Provisional Corps and fought at the Battle of Wyse Fork.

== Postbellum career ==
Harland resigned from the army on June 22, 1865, and resumed his law practice. He served as a state legislator in Connecticut and was active in the militia, becoming the state's adjutant general. He also served as a judge and banker before dying in his hometown of Norwich.

== See also ==
- List of American Civil War generals (Union)

== Notes ==
Military offices
| Preceded by William B. Franklin | Connecticut Adjutant General; 1879 - 1880 | Succeeded by George M. Harmon |
