= George Cowles (soldier) =

Major General George Cowles
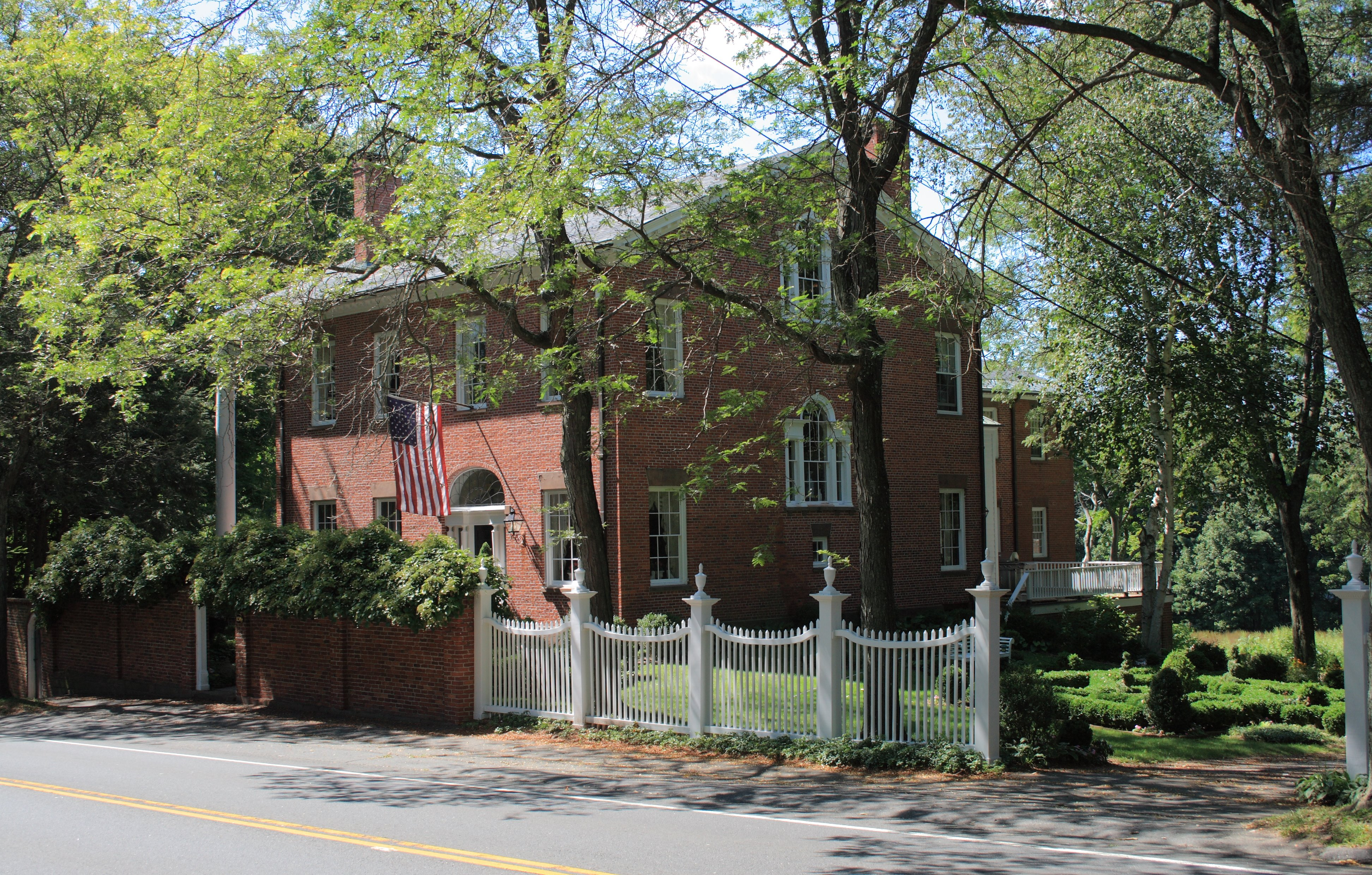
- The home in which General Cowles resided still stands today
- Born: c. 1780; Farmington, Connecticut
- Died: January 7, 1860 (aged 79); Farmington, Connecticut
- Allegiance: United States
- Service / branch: United States Army
- Rank: Major General
- Commands: Connecticut State Militia
- Spouse(s): Abigail Deming
- Website: www.ct.gov/mil

George Cowles, was the Adjutant General of the State of Connecticut from 1823 to 1834. He also served as a representative in the Connecticut General Assembly and was an unsuccessful merchant in his home town of Farmington.

== Career ==
The Cowles family was a prominent family of Farmington, Connecticut, with many family members successful in farming and manufacturing. George, however, was not as successful in business and turned to a political career, being elected to the state legislature in 1815 as the representative from Farmington. He then served as the town assessor in 1821 and then as the First Selectman.

In 1823, with little military experience, he was appointed as the Adjutant General of the state's armed forces by Governor Wolcott. He served in this capacity for the next three governors, leaving office in 1834.

== Personal life ==
George married Abigail Deming, also of Farmington, on December 3, 1803, and together they had four children. The home where they lived was built by his father, General Solomon Cowles in 1803. The house was presented to George and Abigail as a wedding present. The house still stands today and is listed on National Register of Historic Places.

Military offices
Preceded by Ebenezer Huntington	Connecticut Adjutant General; 1823 - 1834	Succeeded by William Hayden
