= 118th Airlift Squadron =

118th Airlift Squadron

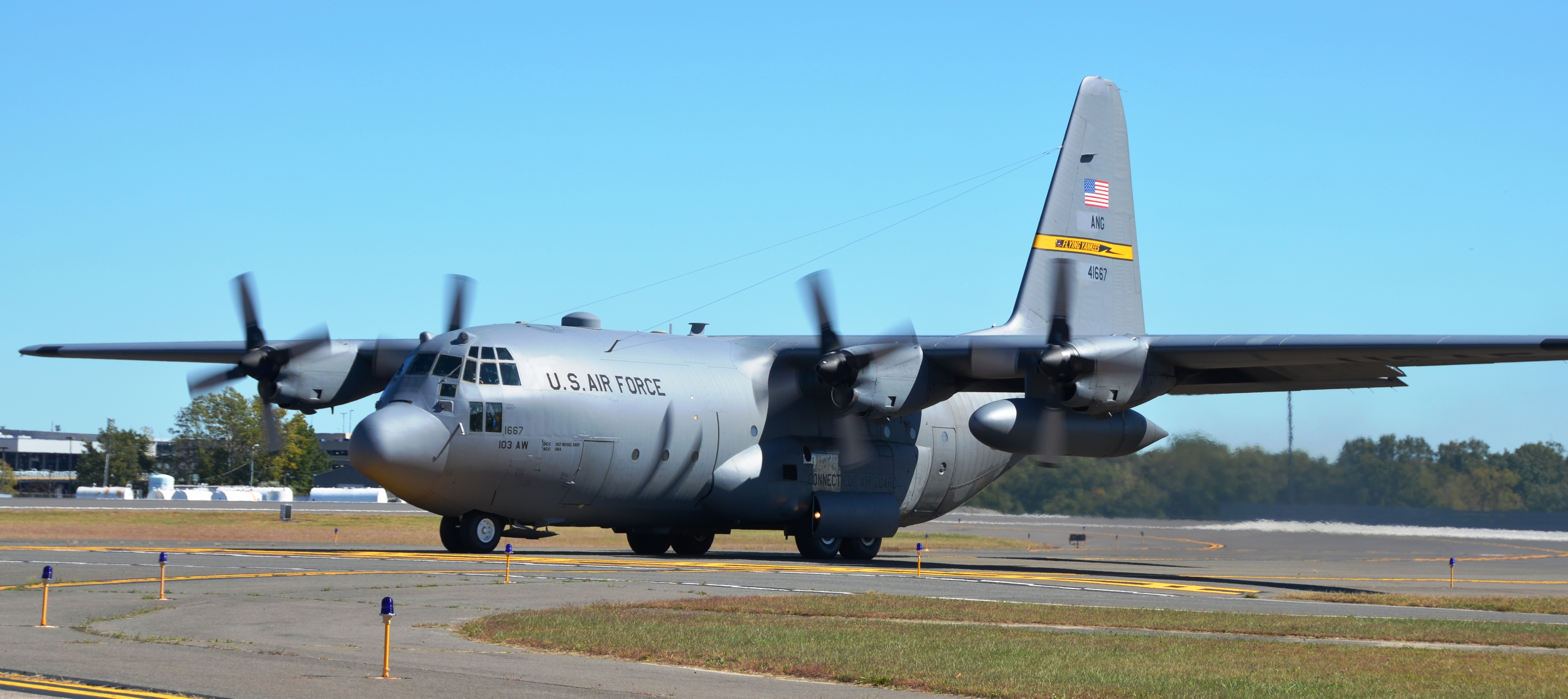
- 118th Airlift Squadron – C-130H
- Active: –1919; 1923–1945; 1946–`952; 1953–present
- Country: United States
- Allegiance: Connecticut
- Branch: Air National Guard
- Type: Squadron
- Role: Airlift
- Part of: Connecticut Air National Guard
- Garrison/HQ: Bradley Air National Guard Base, Connecticut
- Nickname: Flying Yankees
- Engagements: World War I China-Burma-India Theater
- Decorations: Distinguished Unit Citation

Insignia
- 118th Airlift Squadron emblem (Note: Approved 13 August 1953. The emblem was approved when the squadron was the 118th Fighter-Bomber Squadron, but remains the same except for the designation on the scroll. The fleur-de-lis on this emblem was added to the earlier emblem of the 118th Observation Squadron to reflect its service in France during World War I.)

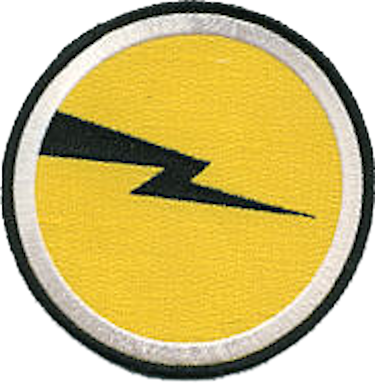
- 118th Tactical Reconnaissance Squadron emblem

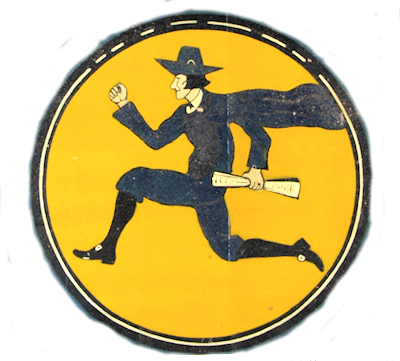
- Patch with 118th Observation Squadron emblem
- Tail code: CT

The 118th Airlift Squadron is a unit of the Connecticut Air National Guard 103d Airlift Wing stationed at Bradley Air National Guard Base, Connecticut. The 118th is equipped with the C-130H.

The squadron is a descendant organization of the World War I 118th Aero Squadron, established on 31 August 1917. It was reformed on 1 November 1923, as the 118th Observation Squadron, and is one of the 29 original National Guard Observation Squadrons of the United States Army National Guard formed before World War II.

== History ==
=== World War I ===
The 118th Airlift Squadron traces its origins to 1 September 1917 with the organization of the 118th Aero Squadron at Kelly Field, Texas. The original members of the squadron had enlisted at Fort Slocum, New York. The men were placed into basic indoctrination training, with drill, fatigue duty, classroom training, and other things that are done in military training camps. During its time at Kelly Field, men were transferred in and out of the squadron, depending on their qualifications and the needs of other units in training. Once basic indoctrination training was completed, the 118th was ordered for overseas duty, being ordered to report to the Aviation Concentration Center, Garden City, Long Island on 3 January. It was there that final arrangements were made for the trip overseas, complete equipment was drawn and a final few transfers were made. The stay at Garden City lasted ten days, when movement orders were received to report to the New York Port of Embarkation, Hoboken, New Jersey. There, the squadron boarded the SS Kaiser Wilhelm II, on the 13th, a former German liner impressed into troop carrier duty by the United States.

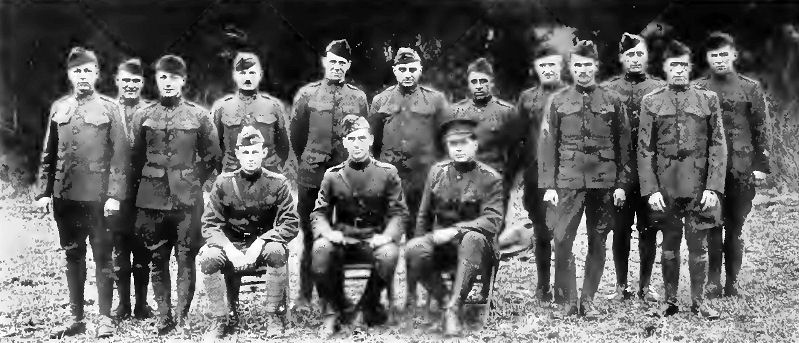
639th Aero Squadron Officers and NCOs – 1918

The crossing of the Atlantic was not without incident, as extremely heavy seas were encountered the fourth day at sea. The ocean was so rough that several sailors were thrown overboard. The ship was put about, but too sharply and the rudder jammed. Then followed several hours of terror for all aboard as the big ship wallowed about helpless in the rough ocean. The decks were ordered lighted for the first time and powerful searchlights swept the water for the men swept overboard. It was reported the next day that the ship was tossed about 41 1/2 degrees in the ocean. Trucks, furniture, loose equipment and men were thrown about and considerable damage was done. Finally, the rudder was repaired and the journey was resumed. Land was sighted on the morning of 24 January and a great sense of relief was felt by all when the French harbor of Brest was entered. However, four more days were spent on the ship before disembarkation was made, the squadron setting foot in France on 28 January.

From Brest, the squadron traveled by train to the Replacement Concentration Center, AEF, St. Maixent Replacement Barracks, France, arriving on 29 January 1918. At St. Maixent, the 118th was re-organized according to the vocations of the men. As a consequence, many changes were made with transfers in and out of the squadron. Also, on 1 February, the squadron was redesignated as the 639th Aero Squadron and was classified as a transportation and supply unit. It was ordered to report to Ourches Aerodrome in the "Zone of Advance" (Western Front), and after several days on a very uncomfortable French troop train, the squadron arrived. It was met by the Commanding Officer, a Lieutenant, who explained that the 639th was the first squadron to arrive at the new Aerodrome. There was no place to be billeted except in some barns, and that its work (after the rain ended) would be to construct the base, including a flying field. It was a very cold, rainy winter's day, the streets were covered in slush, and the men were cold, wet and fatigued from the long train journey. After resting the next day (Sunday), the squadron started early on Monday morning. The construction of the new base was actually the first work of any value made by the squadron since leaving Kelly Field. The 465th Aero Squadron (Construction) arrived a few days later, along with Company B, 119th Machine Gun Battalion in a week to assist with the effort. However the 119th only stayed for a few days, with the 639th and 465th together performing the majority of the work. Barracks, mess halls, hangars, warehouses, were erected. Roads were laid out and graded, along with bomb dugouts and ditches for protection against air raids. Also an airfield was laid out.

Towards the end of March, enough construction was completed that the squadron was able to move into the new barracks it helped to build, and in April, the camp and airfield was ready for the first combat squadron of airplanes to move in. The 1st Aero Squadron, the most senior squadron in the Air Service arrived with Spad observation planes and a full complement of motor transportation on 4 April, however construction work continued. Poor weather delayed the work, the men having to work in boots and raincoats. Flying was extremely limited, and at night, the sounds of German planes were heard in the skies.

In early May, the 639th Aero Squadron was moved to Amanty Airdrome, about 20 miles from Ourches. Travel was by truck, and when it arrived, the squadron was pleased to see that most of the construction work was already completed. However, shortly after arrival, the squadron was hit by an epidemic of "Spanish flu". Despite the sickness, some of the men were able to help construct a few hangars and drive some trucks. Others were detailed to work in the machine shop and on a few airplanes. Also a few men were able to go into the air as passengers. After a month, the squadron was again ordered to move to the II Corps Aeronautical School at Châtillon-sur-Seine, France, arriving on 8 June.

Upon arrival at Châtillon, it was announced that the 639th was to become a "Service Squadron", however its first four days were spent putting up barracks for the men to move into. Then the men were classified according to past experiences and place in various shops, the radio department, armory, and on the airfield as airplane crews. The men were paired in every case with the men of the 89th Aero Squadron, who acted as instructors. Since many of the men were mechanics in civil life, they picked up the skills very easily, and in about two months they worked on their own responsibility in whatever jobs needed to be accomplished. The squadron remained at Châtillon until after the Armistice with Germany in November 1918, then returned to the United States in late May 1919. It arrived at Mitchel Field, New York, where the squadron members were demobilized and returned to civilian life.

=== Connecticut National Guard ===
The National Defense Act of 1921 provided for a number of National Guard Aviation Squadrons and the 43d Aero Squadron was re-designated as the 43d Division Air Service Squadron.

As a National Guard unit the squadron became a part of the 43d Division, I Corps, First Corps Area, at that time made up of National Guard Troops from Connecticut, Rhode Island and Vermont. Since there were no airfields in Connecticut capable of handling military type aircraft, the squadron was initially allocated to the Rhode Island National Guard.

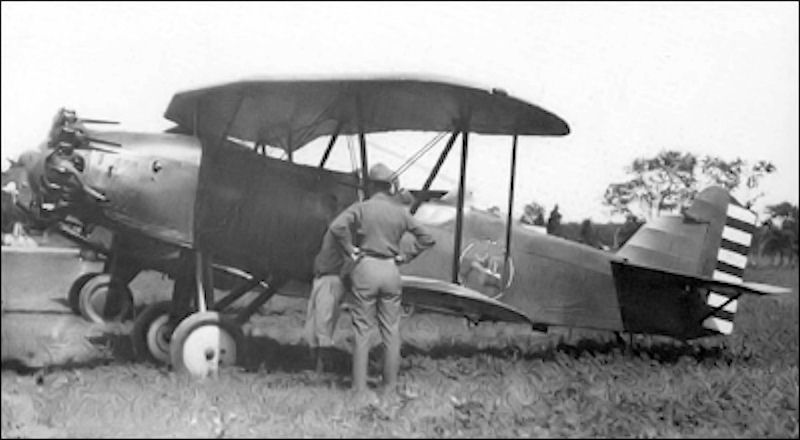
118th Observation Squadron – Curtiss XO-12 Falcon, about 1926

However, after the opening of Brainard Field in Hartford in October 1922, efforts were immediately launched to secure the Air Service unit of the 43d Division for the State of Connecticut. Rhode Island, apparently without a great deal of argument, soon relinquished its claim and the squadron was reassigned to Connecticut as the 118th Observation Squadron, Connecticut National Guard.

When the squadron was officially organized on 1 November 1923, there were some 66 officers and enlisted men officially on board. During the 1920s and 30s, the 118th "grew and prospered". Originally issued with obsolete Curtiss JN-4 "Jennies" left over from World War I, the unit was later equipped with experimental Curtiss OX-12's with rotary engines and a swept-wing design. The squadron, or elements thereof, called up to perform the following state duties: riot control at the textile workers strike at Putnam, CT, in September 1934; and flood relief at Hartford, CT, 19 March-1 April 1936. Conducted summer training at Mitchell Field, NY, or Trumbull Field, CT. Detachments were sent some years to fly spotter missions during the summer training of the 192d Field Artillery Regiment.

The 118th entered the 1940s with war in Europe already a reality and eventual U.S. involvement becoming more and more likely. The 118th was preparing to meet that eventuality. In 1940 the squadron was detached from the 43rd Division to become a part of I Army Corps, Aviation. Simultaneously, plans were being drawn up "for the entire unit to move to Jacksonville, Florida for intensive training over a period of an entire year".

=== World War II ===
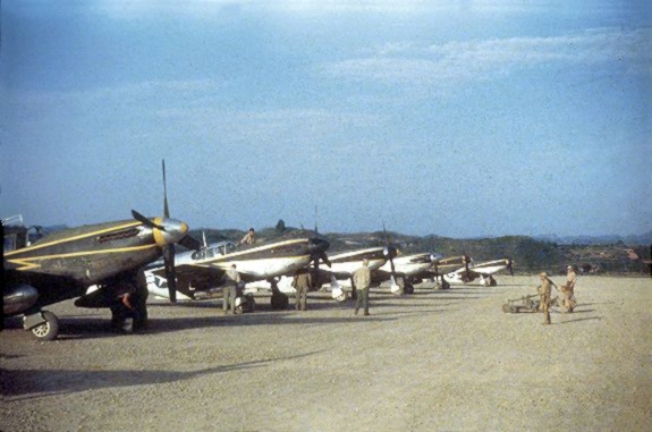
U.S Army Air Forces North American F-6 Mustang aircraft of the 118th Reconnaissance Squadron at Laohwangping, China, in June 1945.

In March 1941 the 118th was activated and moved to Jacksonville Army Air Field, Florida where it flew antisubmarine patrols over the South Georgia and Florida Atlantic coastline. After the Japanese Attack on Pearl Harbor, it moved to Charleston, South Carolina and patrolled the approaches to the Charleston Navy Yard along with the South Carolina Atlantic coast.

With the Army Air Forces Antisubmarine Command taking over the coastal patrol mission, Third Air Force reassigned the squadron to Tullaholma AAF, Tennessee where it began training in combat reconnaissance and aerial photography and mapping. During 1943 the unit transitioned to combat aircraft (P-49, P-39, A-20, B-25, and finally, the P-51) and was re-designated as the 118th Tactical Reconnaissance Squadron. The 118th trained with Army ground forces at Fort Campbell, Kentucky, Fort Benning, Georgia, Fort Jackson, South Carolina and Fort Polk, Louisiana as a combat observation squadron.

Deployed to the China Burma India Theater of operations as part of the 23d Fighter Group, the "Flying Tigers." The unit participated in security patrol, close air support, and ground attack missions as part of the 23d Fighter Group.

Following the conclusion of the war, the 118th was inactivated.

=== Connecticut Air National Guard ===
The 118th Tactical Reconnaissance Squadron was redesignated as the 118th Fighter Squadron, Single Engine and allotted to the National Guard on 24 May 1946. It was organized at Bradley Field, Windsor Locks, Connecticut, and was extended federal recognition on 7 August 1946. The squadron was equipped with F-47D Thunderbolts and assigned to the Connecticut ANG 103d Fighter Group.

The mission of the 118th Fighter Squadron was the air defense of Connecticut. Aircraft parts were no problem and many of the maintenance personnel were World War II veterans so readiness was quite high and the planes were often much better maintained than their USAF counterparts. In some ways, the postwar Air National Guard was almost like a flying country club and a pilot could often show up at the field, check out an aircraft and go flying. However, the unit also had regular military exercises that kept up proficiency and in gunnery and bombing contests they would often score at least as well or better than active-duty USAF units, given the fact that most ANG pilots were World War II combat veterans.

==== Korean War activation ====
With the surprise invasion of South Korea on 25 June 1950, and the regular military's lack of readiness, most of the Air National Guard was called to active duty. The 118th was federalized on 10 February 1951 and assigned to Air Defense Command (ADC), which redesignated it the 118th Fighter-Interceptor Squadron and assigned its parent 103d Fighter-Interceptor Group to Eastern Air Defense Force. The squadron moved to Suffolk County Air Force Base, New York on 1 June 1951, flying air defense missions with their F-47D Thunderbolts. However, ADC was experiencing difficulty under the existing wing base organizational structure in deploying its fighter squadrons to best advantage. It therefore reorganized on a regional basis and the 118th was assigned to the 4709th Defense Wing, located at McGuire Air Force Base, New Jersey. During its period of federalization, the 118th FIS transferred many of its pilots and ground support personnel to Fifth Air Force, where they served in combat in Korea, while regulars and reservists were assigned to the squadron. On 1 November 1952, the 118th was returned to the control of the Connecticut Air National Guard and its mission, personnel and aircraft were assigned to the 45th Fighter-Interceptor Squadron.

==== Cold War ====
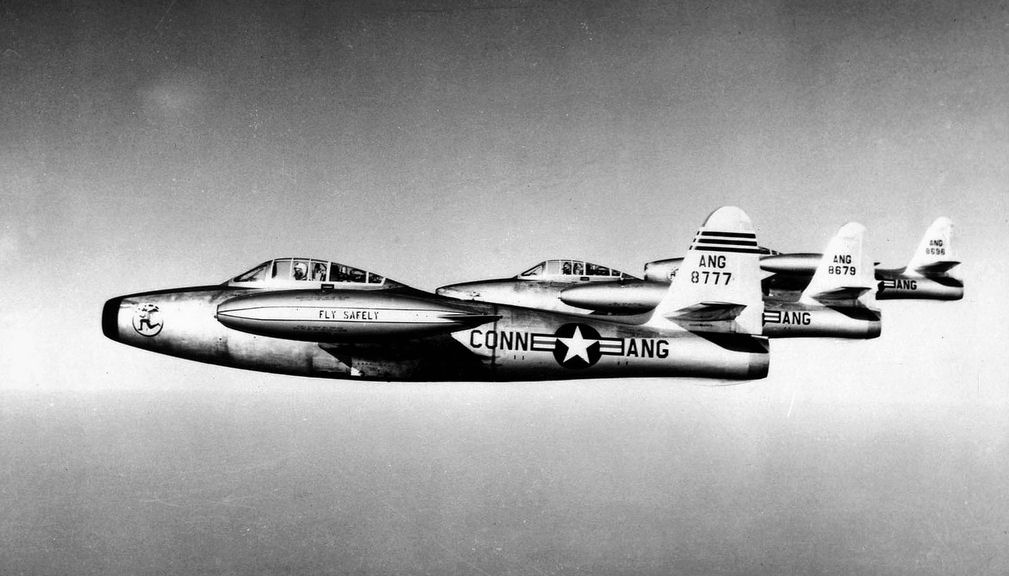
118th Fighter-Bomber Squadron - F-84D Thunderjet formation 1954

The Connecticut Air National Guard was re-activated on 1 November 1952 with the end of the unit's federalization period. The 103d was re-activated as a Fighter-Bomber Wing being Tactical Air Command-gained. However, Air Defense Command remained as a secondary mission.

Upon the 118th's return, the F-47s were sent to Davis-Monthan Air Force Base for storage and the squadron was re-equipped with Very Long Range F-51H Mustangs by TAC with a close air support mission. In January 1953, the 103d received several F-84D Thunderjets for maintenance instruction, and the squadron was fully equipped with the Thunderjet during the summer of 1953.

In the spring of 1955, the F-84Gs were transferred to the Georgia ANG 128th Fighter-Interceptor Squadron, and the 118th converted to F-94B Starfires. The F-94Bs, however, only remained with the 118th for about a year when they were replaced by F-86H Sabre Tactical Fighters in 1957.

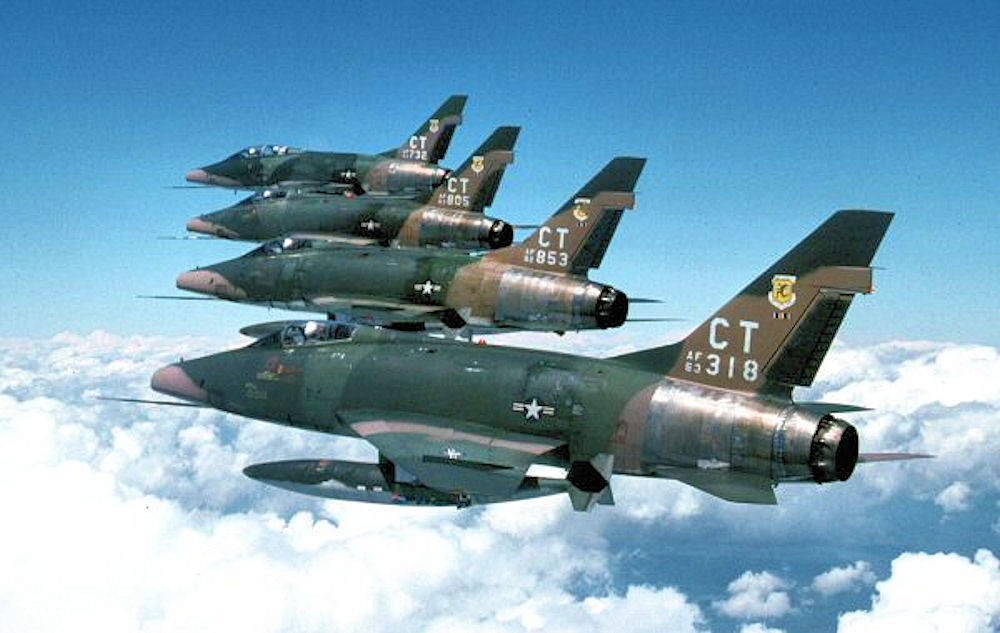
118th Tactical Fighter Squadron – F-100D Formation, 1975

The Sabres were then replaced by F-100A Super Sabres during the summer of 1960 and the Wing becoming fully ADC-gained. The F-100As gave way to F-102 Delta Daggers in January 1966 and standing a 24-hour air defense alert. then in 1971 transferred back to Tactical Air Command, becoming an F-100D Super Sabre Group.

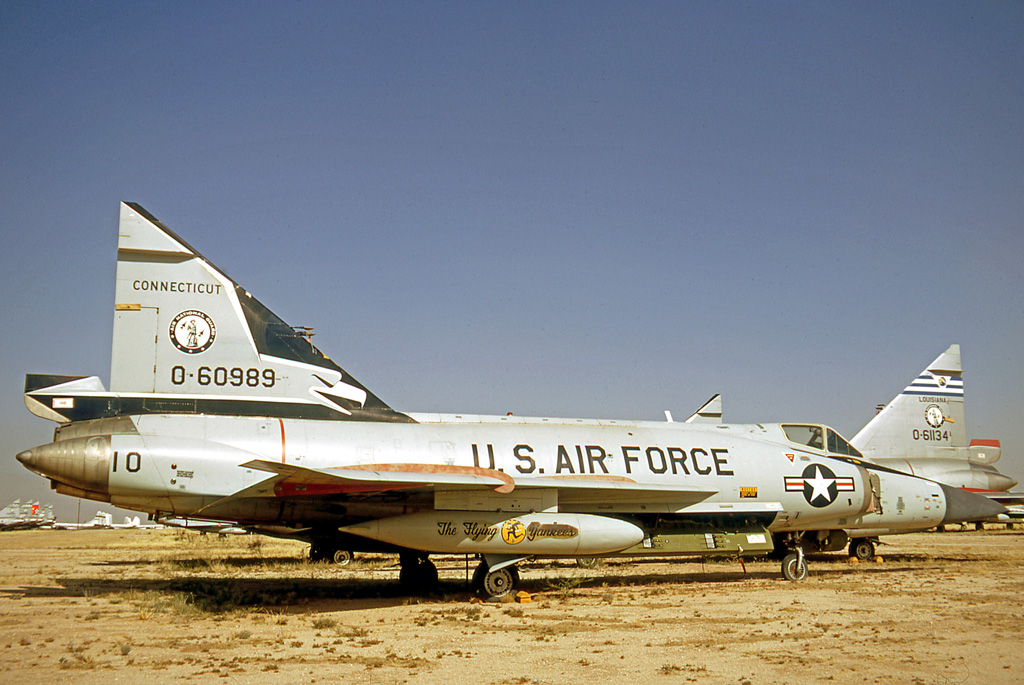
118 FIS Convair F-102A Delta Dagger in 1971 wearing The Flying Yankees on the under-wing fuel tank

From 1971 to 1979, the 103d flew the F-100 Super Sabres and its mission was close air support and began a NATO commitment, deploying frequently in the 1970s to bases in West Germany to reinforce United States Air Forces in Europe (USAFE). In 1979, the unit was assigned new A-10 Thunderbolt IIs as part of the "Total Force" concept which equipped ANG units with front-line USAF aircraft. The USAFE commitment continued, deploying the "Warthog" to bases in West Germany and Italy.

In 1990 the 103d was programmed to receive the specialized Block 10 F-16A/B Fighting Falcon, also referred to as the F/A-16 due to its close air support configuration. The 1990 Gulf Crisis, however, delayed this transition. During Operation Desert Storm, the F/A-16 was battle tested and it was discovered that the Close Air Support F-16 project proved to be a miserable failure. Subsequently, the conversion of the Wing was cancelled in 1993, and the 118th TFS remained an A-10 Thunderbolt II close air support squadron.

==== Air Combat Command ====
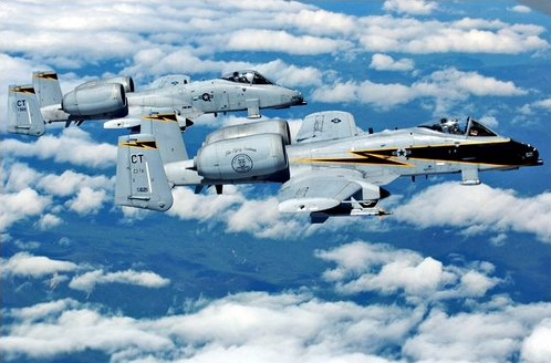
A-10As 118th FS Connecticut ANG in flight 2007

In March 1992, with the end of the Cold War, the 103d adopted the Air Force Objective Organization plan, and the unit was re-designated as the 103d Fighter Group. In June, Tactical Air Command was inactivated as part of the Air Force reorganization after the end of the Cold War. It was replaced by Air Combat Command. In 1995, in accordance with the Air Force "One Base-One Wing" directive, the 103d was changed in status back to a Wing, and the 118th Fighter Squadron was assigned to the new 103d Operations Group.

In mid-1996, the Air Force, in response to budget cuts, and changing world situations, began experimenting with Air Expeditionary organizations. The Air Expeditionary Force concept was developed that would mix Active-Duty, Reserve and Air National Guard elements into a combined force. Instead of entire permanent units deploying as "Provisional" as in the 1991 Gulf War, Expeditionary units are composed of "aviation packages" from several wings, including active-duty Air Force, the Air Force Reserve Command and the Air National Guard, would be married together to carry out the assigned deployment rotation.

Subsequently, in August 1996, the 118th Expeditionary Fighter Squadron deployed to Aviano Air Base, Italy to assume the primary close air support mission of international forces in Bosnia. Other deployments of the 118th EFS were made to augment combat operations during Operations Deny Flight and Precise Endeavor.

==== Airlift mission ====
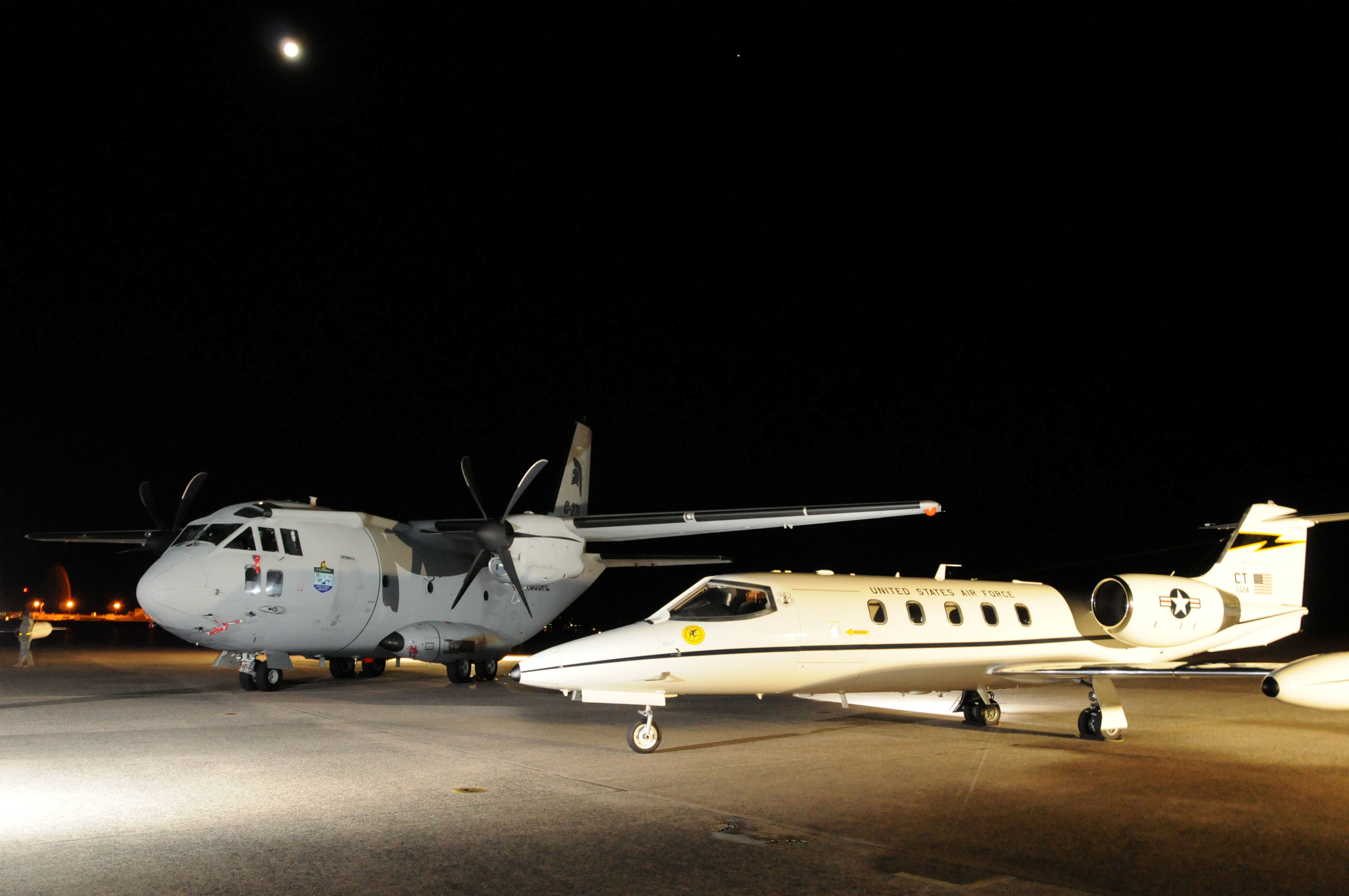
118th Airlift Squadron C-21A Learjet and a C-27J Spartan

In its 2005 BRAC Recommendations, DoD recommended to realign Bradley International Airport Air Guard Station by distributing the 103rd's A-10s to the 104th Fighter Wing, Barnes Municipal Airport Air Guard Station, MA (nine aircraft) and retirement (six aircraft). The wing's expeditionary combat support (ECS) elements would remain in place at Bradley and Bradley would retain capability to support a Homeland Defense mission. By combining the two units into one squadron the Air Force would retain the trained A-10 pilots and maintenance technicians in the area and create an optimum-sized and more effective squadron.

In April 2008, the 103d became an Airlift Wing. Its new missions now include; a bridge mission flying C-21A Learjets supporting JOSAC VIP airlift, counter drug operations in the U.S., Central America, South America and the Caribbean, A Centralized Intermediate Repair Facility (CIRF) for TF-34 engines used on A-10 attack aircraft and an Air Operations Center (AOC) responsible for Command and Control operations during wartime.

Sometime between FY 2012 and 2014, the 103d was programmed to receive the new Joint Cargo Aircraft, the C-27 Spartan. However, the Air Force has recently announced the end of the C-27 Spartan program, eliminating the aircraft from Air National Guards units. It was speculated that the 103d will transition to an MC-12W mission. The primary use of the MC-12W is providing intelligence, surveillance and reconnaissance, or ISR, support directly to ground forces however it is changing to the C-130

== Lineage ==
- Organized as the 118th Aero Squadron on 31 August 1917 (Note: This unit is not related to the 118th Aero Squadron that was organized at Kelly Field in April 1918, moved to Brooks Field, Texas, where it was redesignated Squadron C, Brooks Field in June 1918 and demobilied in November.)

Redesignated 118th Aero Squadron (Supply) on 1 September 1917
Redesignated 639th Aero Squadron (Supply) on 1 February 1918
Demobilized on 6 June 1919
Reconstituted and consolidated with the 118th Observation Squadron on 20 October 1936

- Constituted in the National Guard in 1921 as the 118th Squadron (Observation) and allotted to the state of Connecticut

Redesignated 118th Observation Squadron and organized on 25 January 1923
Federally recognized and activated on 1 November 1923
Consolidated with the 639th Aero Squadron on 20 October 1936
Ordered to active service on 24 February 1941
Redesignated 118th Observation Squadron (Light) on 13 January 1942
Redesignated 118th Observation Squadron on 4 July 1942
Redesignated 118th Reconnaissance Squadron (Fighter) on 2 April 1943
Redesignated 118th Tactical Reconnaissance Squadron on 11 August 1943
Inactivated on 7 November 1945
Redesignated 118th Fighter Squadron and allotted to the National Guard on 24 May 1946
Activated on 1 July 1946
Extended federal recognition on 7 August 1946
Redesignated 118th Fighter-Interceptor Squadron on 28 September 1950
Federalized and ordered to active service on 10 February 1951
Inactivated, released from active duty and returned to Connecticut state control on 1 November 1952
Redesignated 118th Fighter-Bomber Squadron and activated on 1 January 1953
Redesignated 118th Fighter-Interceptor Squadron on 1 May 1956
Redesignated 118th Tactical Fighter Squadron on 30 November 1957
Redesignated 118th Fighter-Interceptor Squadron on 1 September 1960
Redesignated 118th Tactical Fighter Squadron on 12 June 1971
Redesignated 118th Fighter Squadron on 15 March 1992
Redesignated 118th Airlift Squadron on 1 April 2008

=== Assignments ===
- Post Headquarters, Kelly Field, 31 August 1917 – 3 January 1918
- Aviation Concentration Center, 3–13 January 1918
- Replacement Concentration Center, AEF, 29 January-3 March 1918
- II Corps Aeronautical School, AEF, 3 March 1918 – March 1919
- Post Headquarters, Mitchel Field, c. 22 May-6 June 1919
- Connecticut National Guard (divisional aviation, 43d Division), 1 November 1923
- IV Army Corps, 24 February 1941
- 66th Observation Group (later 66th Reconnaissance Group, 66th Tactical Reconnaissance Group), 1 September 1941
- III Reconnaissance Command, Oct 1943
- AAF, India-Burma Sector, Jan 1944 (attached to Tenth Air Force after, 14 February 1944)
- Fourteenth Air Force, c. 12 June 1944 (attached to 23d Fighter Group after c. 16 Jun 1944)
- Tenth Air Force, 1 August 1945 (attached to 23d Fighter Group until c. 15 August 1945)
- Fourteenth Air Force, 25 August – 7 November 1945
- 103d Fighter Group (later 103d Fighter-Interceptor Group), 7 August 1946
- 4709th Defense Wing, 6 February 1952
- 103d Fighter-Interceptor Group (later 103d Fighter Group, 103d Tactical Fighter Group, 103d Fighter Group, 103d Tactical Fighter Group, 103d Fighter Group), 1 November 1952
- 103d Operations Group, 11 October 1995 – present

=== Stations ===
- Kelly Field, Texas, 31 August 1917
- Aviation Concentration Center, Garden City, New York, 3–13 January 1918
- St. Maixent Replacement Barracks, France, 29 January 1918
- Ourches Aerodrome, France, 3 March 1918
- Amanty Aerodrome, France

Detachment at Ourches Aerodrome, c. 24 March 1918

- Châtillon-sur-Seine, France, 8 June 1918 – 1919
- Mitchel Field, New York, c. 22 May-6 June 1919
- Hartford Airport, Connecticut, 1 November 1923
- Jacksonville Army Air Field, Florida, 16 March 1941
- Charleston Army Air Field, South Carolina, 22 January 1942
- Tullahoma Army Air Base, Tennessee, 8 September 1942
- Morris Field, North Carolina, 9 November 1942
- Camp Campbell, Kentucky, 2 April 1943
- Statesboro Army Air Field, Georgia, 23 June 1943
- Aiken Army Air Field, South Carolina, 29 August 1943
- Key Field, Mississippi, 25 October-18 December 1943
- Gushkara, India, 16 February 1944

Detachments operated from Chakulia and Kharagpur, India, March–June 1944

- Chengkung, China, June 1944

Air echelon at Kewilin, China, 16 June-14 September 1944

- Liuchow, China, 34 September-7 November 1944, and Suichwan, China, 12 November 1944 – 22 January 1945

Operated primarily from Laohwangping, China, after 14 April 1945

- Laohwangping, China, June 1945
- Liuchow, China, C. 25 August-26 September 1945
- Camp Kilmer, New Jersey, 5–7 November 1945
- Bradley Field, Connecticut, 7 August 1946
- Suffolk County Air Force Base, New York, 10 February 1951 – 1 November 1952
- Bradley International Airport (later Bradley Air National Guard Base), 1 January 1953 – present

=== Aircraft ===
- In addition to JN type, TW-3, PT-1, BT-1, 0–2, and O-17. briefly included DH-4, SE-5, and M-1 during period 1924–1932
- Douglas O-38E, 1931 c. 1937
- Douglas O-46, 1936–1943
- North American O-47, c. 1939-c. 1942
- P-39 Airacobra, c. 1942–1943
- O-49 Vigilant, 1941–1942
- O-57 Grasshopper, 1941–1942
- O-58 Grasshopper, 1941–1942
- O-59 Grasshopper, 1941–1942
- B-25 Mitchell, 1942–1943
- A-20 Havoc, 1942–1943
- L-5 Sentinel, 1942–1945
- P-40N Warhawk, 1942–1945
- P-51C/D/K Mustang, 1944–1945
- F-6D/K Mustang, 1945
- F-47N Thunderbolt, 1946–1952
- F-51H Mustang, 1952–1953
- F-84D Thunderjet, 1953–1956
- F-94B Starfire, 1956–1957
- F-86H Sabre, 1957–1960
- F-100A Super Sabre, 1960–1966
- F/TF-102A Delta Dagger, 1966–1971
- F-100D/F Super Sabre, 1971–1979
- A-10A/OA-10A Thunderbolt II, 1979–2008
- C-21A Learjet, 2007–2013
- C-130H Hercules, 2013 – present

== See also ==
- List of American aero squadrons
- List of observation squadrons of the United States Army National Guard
