= Connecticut Adjutant General =

American military officer rank

Adjutant General of Connecticut
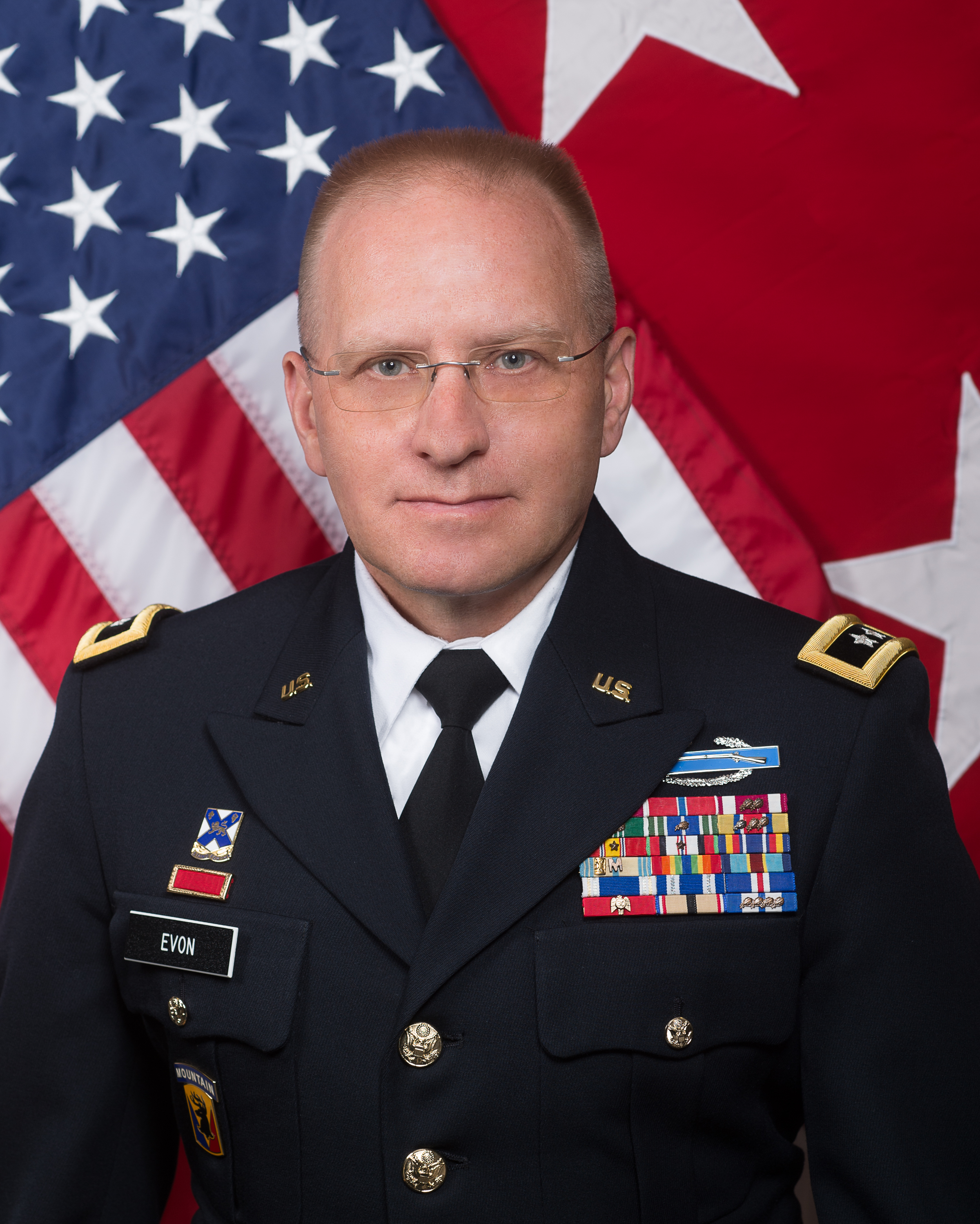
- Incumbent; Major General Francis J. Evon, Jr., CTARNG since July 1, 2018; 8 years, 2 months and 20 days
- Term length: 4 years
- Inaugural holder: John Keyes, 1782
- Website: www.ct.gov/mil

The Adjutant General of Connecticut is the highest-ranking military officer in the Armed Forces of the State of Connecticut which includes the Connecticut National Guard, the four units of the Governor's Guards, the Connecticut State Guard, the Connecticut State Guard Reserve and the Connecticut Naval Militia. The current Adjutant General is Major General Francis J. Evon, Jr. He was appointed to a four-year term effective July 1, 2018.

== Appointment ==
The Governor of the State of Connecticut appoints the Adjutant General to a four-year term beginning on July 1 in the same year of the state's gubernatorial election. The Adjutant General is required to have a minimum of fifteen years of commissioned service in the Armed Forces of the United States and have obtained the rank of Lieutenant Colonel or Commander. The Adjutant General can have served in any branch of the United States military and there is no requirement that they must have served in the National Guard. The Adjutant General can not be appointed or continue to serve once they have reached the age of sixty-four.

== History ==
On May 11, 1637, the General Courts of the Connecticut Colony established a military arm of the government. This organization was the forerunner to the Connecticut Military Department in which its head is the Adjutant General. The position of Adjutant General was first officially established within Connecticut Law in 1784. "And be it further enacted that there shall be from Time to Time appointed, as may be necessary, by Warrant one Adjutant General over the whole Militia of this State.' Originally there was no requirement of prior military service. In 1796, the Connecticut Acts & Laws were further update in accordance with national law in which the duties of the Adjutant General were defined to be to distribute all orders from the Commander-in-Chief of the state to the several Corps and to attend all public reviews where the Commander-in-Chief of the state will review the militia. In 1939, the Military Department was established in order to consolidate all armed forces of the state under the Adjutant General. This included the units of the Governor's Guards and Naval Militia as well as the National Guard. The Connecticut Office of Civil Defense was established in 1959 and became a subordinate agency of the Connecticut Military Department under the authority of the Adjutant General to respond to natural disasters, civil disturbances and other events. The office was renamed in 1973 to the Office of Civil Preparedness and in 1979, both organizations became subordinate to the Department of Public Safety, the agency which also included the State Police. The Adjutant General regained authority of the Office of Civil Preparedness in 1999, which was renamed the Office of Emergency Management in 1988. This was short-lived as in 2004 the Adjutant General once again lost authority over the Office of Emergency Management which was merged into a new state agency, the Department of Emergency Management and Homeland Security. The Adjutant General still maintains responsibility for readying the National Guard to respond to domestic issues as required by the Governor, but works in coordination with the now Department of Emergency Services and Public Protection, which has primary responsibility for planning and responding to natural disasters and other domestic responses.

== List of Adjutants General of the State of Connecticut ==
Term	Name
1782–1791	John Keyes
1792–1822	Ebenezer Huntington
1823–1834	George Cowles
1835–1836	William Hayden
1837–1839	Samuel L. Pitkin
1840–1845	Charles T. Hillyer
1846–1847	James T. Pratt
1848–1851	George P. Shelton
1852–1853	Elihu W.N. Starr
1854–1855	John C. Hollister
1855	Justin Hodge
1855–1862	Joseph D. Williams
1863–1865	Horace J. Morse
1866–1867	Charles T. Stanton
1867–1868	Colin M. Ingersoll
1869–1870	Samuel E. Merwin, Jr.
1870–1871	Colin M. Ingersoll
1871–1872	Samuel E. Merwin, Jr.
1873–1876	William P. Trowbridge
1877–1878	William B. Franklin
1879–1880	Edward Harland
1881–1882	George M. Harmon
1883–1884	Darius N. Couch
1885–1886	Stephen R. Smith
1887–1888	Frederick E. Camp
1889–1890	Lucius A. Barbour
1890–1892	Andrew H. Embler
1893–1894	Edward E. Bradley
1895–1896	Charles P. Graham
1897–1899	George Haven
1899–1900	Louis N. VanKeuren
1901–1929	George M. Cole
1930–1939	William F. Ladd
1939–1947	Reginald B. DeLacour
1948–1962	Frederick G. Reincke
1963–1972	E. Donald Walsh
1972–1982	John F. Freund
1982–1985	John F. Gore
1985–1992	John T. Gereski
1992–1999	David W. Gay
1999–2005	William A. Cugno
2005–2018	Thaddeus J. Martin
2018–Present	Francis J. Evon, Jr.

== See also ==
- Connecticut National Guard
- Current State Adjutants General
