= Connecticut Air National Guard =

- Shield of the Connecticut Air National Guard
- Active: 1 November 1923 - present
- Country: United States
- Allegiance: Connecticut
- Branch: Air National Guard
- Type: State militia, military reserve force
- Role: "To meet state and federal mission responsibilities."
- Size: Approximately 1,200 airmen
- Part of: Connecticut National Guard; United States National Guard Bureau; National Guard
- Garrison/HQ: Connecticut Air National Guard, Bradley Air National Guard Base, 206 Boston Post Road Orange, Connecticut, 06477

Commanders
- Civilian leadership: President Donald Trump (Commander-in-Chief); Troy Meink (Secretary of the Air Force); Governor Ned Lamont (Governor of the State of Connecticut)
- State military leadership: Major General Thaddeus J. Martin (TAG); Brigadier General Daniel L Peabody (AAG)

Aircraft flown
- Transport: Lockheed C-130J

The Connecticut Air National Guard (CT ANG) is the aerial militia of the State of Connecticut, United States of America. It is, along with the Connecticut Army National Guard, an element of the Connecticut National Guard, and also a reserve of the United States Air Force.

As state militia units, the units in the Connecticut Air National Guard are not in the normal United States Air Force chain of command. They are under the jurisdiction of the governor of Connecticut through the office of the Connecticut Adjutant General unless they are federalized by order of the president of the United States. The Connecticut Air National Guard is headquartered at Bradley Air National Guard Base, and its commander is Brigadier General Daniel L Peabody.

== Overview ==
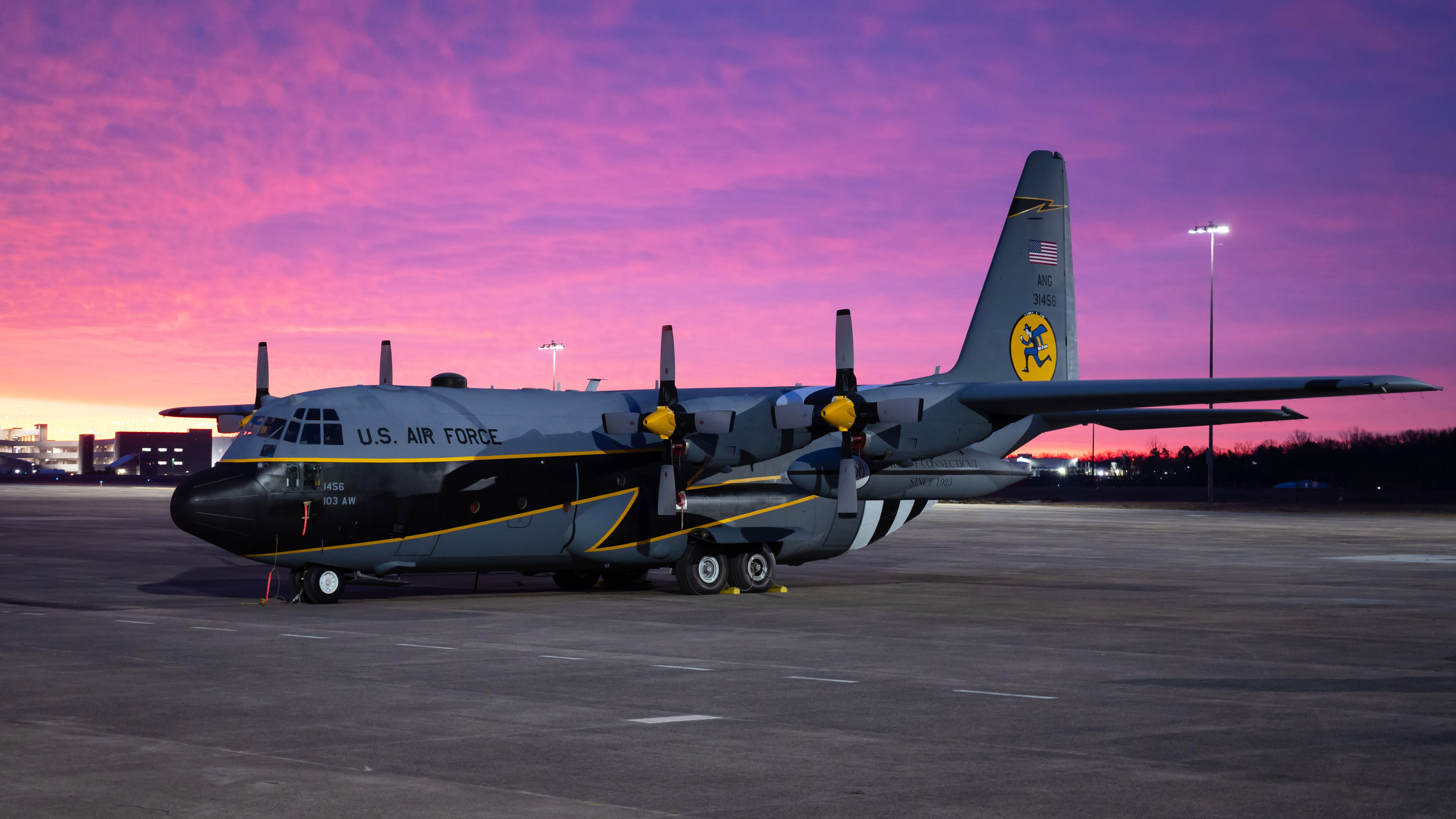
C-130H of the 118th Airlift Squadron, painted to honor the squadron's 100th anniversary, at Bradley Air National Guard Base, 2023

Under the "Total Force" concept, Connecticut Air National Guard units are considered to be Air Reserve Components (ARC) of the United States Air Force (USAF). Connecticut ANG units are trained and equipped by the Air Force and are operationally gained by a major command of the USAF if federalized. In addition, the Connecticut Air National Guard forces are assigned to Air Expeditionary Forces and are subject to deployment tasking orders along with their active duty and Air Force Reserve counterparts in their assigned cycle deployment window.

Along with their federal reserve obligations, as state militia units the elements of the Connecticut ANG are subject to being activated by order of the governor to provide protection of life and property, and preserve peace, order and public safety. State missions include disaster relief in times of earthquakes, hurricanes, floods and forest fires, search and rescue, protection of vital public services, and support to civil defense.

== Components ==
The Connecticut Air National Guard consists of the following major unit:

- 103d Airlift Wing

Established 1 November 1923 (as: 118th Observation Squadron); operates: C-130H Hercules
Stationed at: Bradley Air National Guard Base, Windsor Locks; Gained by: Air Mobility Command
The "Flying Yankees" of the 103rd Airlift Wing are the third oldest Air National Guard unit in the United States, tracing their lineage back over 90 years of military aviation. They currently fly the C-130H, a four-engine turboprop aircraft and its mission is to provide cargo and passenger airlift.

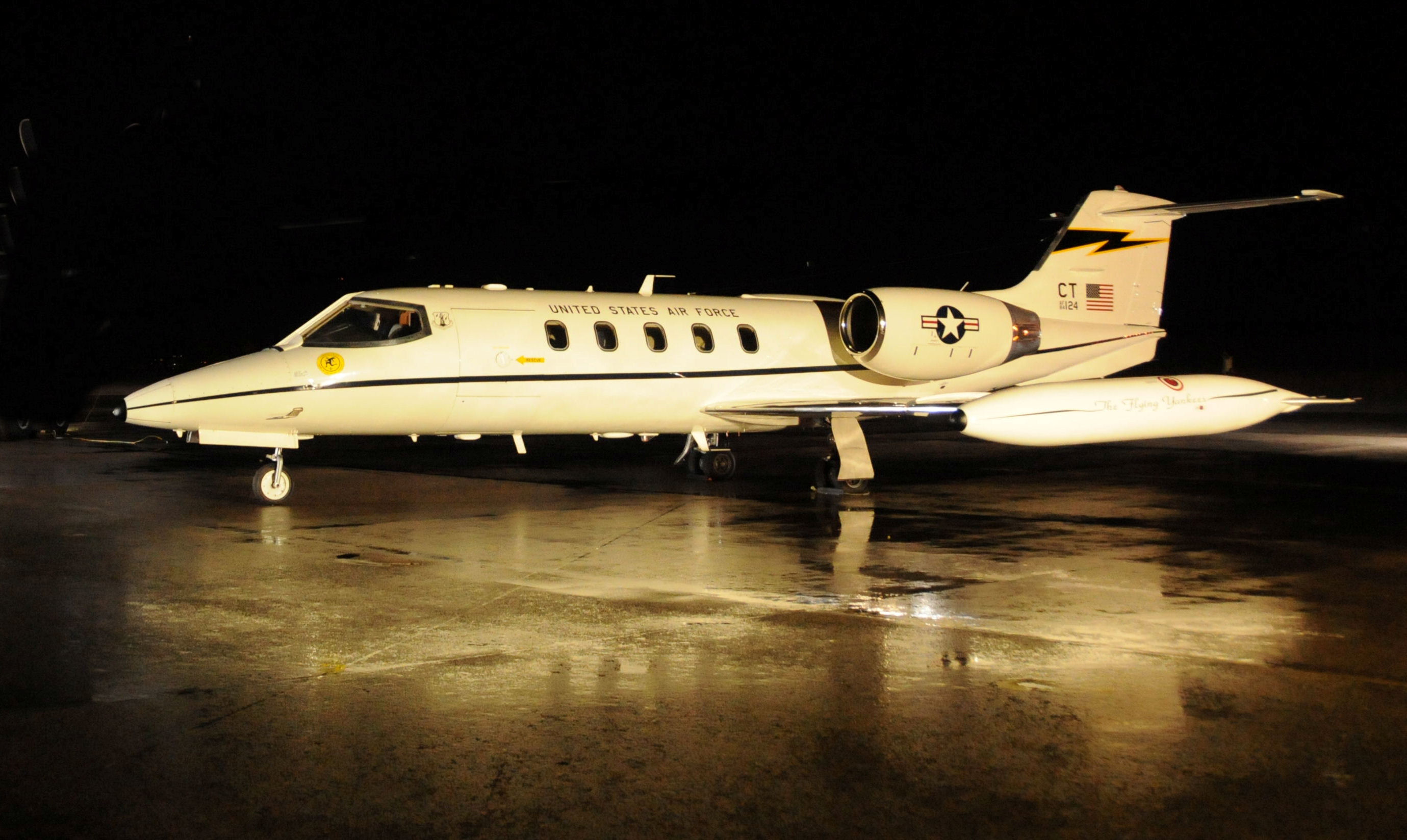
C-21A Learjet of the 118th Airlift Squadron in 2010

Support Unit Functions and Capabilities:

- 103d Air Control Squadron

Stationed at Orange and is known as "Yankee Watch". The mission of the 103d Air Control Squadron is real-time detection, identification and surveillance of air traffic for combat operations and homeland defense. The 103d ACS is the oldest unit of its kind in the United States military.

== History ==
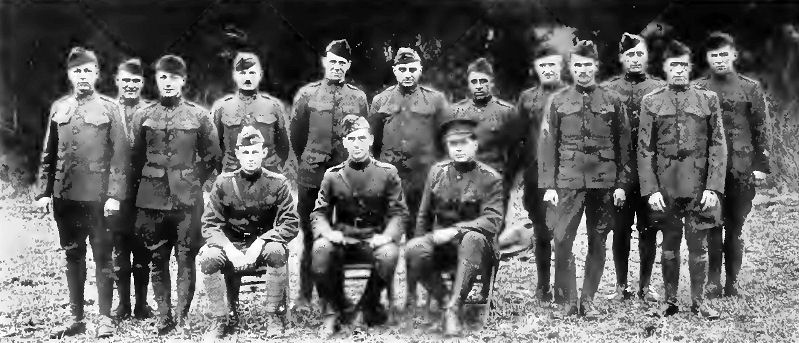
Officers and NCOs of the 639th Aero Squadron, 1918

The 118th Airlift Squadron's origins date to August 1917, when the unit was activated as the 118th Aero Squadron at Kelly Field, Texas. After little more than basic individual and unit training at Kelly, the squadron departed by train for the East Coast en route to France. After a brief stopover at Garden City, Long Island, New York, they sailed for Europe on 13 January 1918, arriving at St. Maixent, France on the 29th of that month. The squadron, re-designated the 639th Aero Service Squadron in France, was credited with honorable service from January to November 1918, but as a construction and support unit, it saw no real combat action. The Fleur-de-lis on the post World War II squadron insignia reflects that service in France.

The war ended in November, but the 639th remained in France until May 1919 when it returned to the United States and was demobilized at Mitchell Field, New York, on 6 June 1919.

=== Connecticut National Guard ===
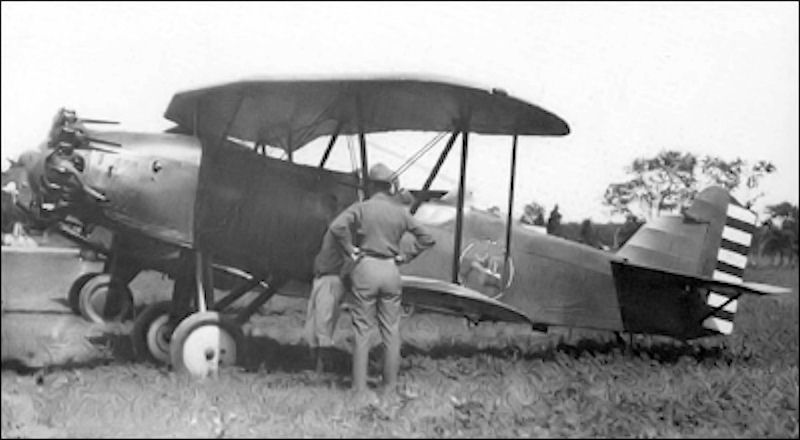
A Curtiss XO-12 Falcon of the 118th Observation Squadron, 1926

The Militia Act of 1903 established the present National Guard system, units raised by the states but paid for by the Federal Government, liable for immediate state service. If federalized by Presidential order, they fall under the regular military chain of command. On 1 June 1920, the Militia Bureau issued Circular No.1 on organization of National Guard air units.

The National Defense Act of 1921 provided for a number of National Guard Aviation Squadrons and the 43d Aero Squadron was re-designated as the 43d Division Air Service Squadron.

As a National Guard unit, the squadron became a part of the 43d Division, at that time made up of National Guard Troops from Connecticut, Rhode Island and Vermont. Since there were no airfields in Connecticut capable of handling military-type aircraft, the 118th was initially assigned to the Rhode Island National Guard for duty. However, after the opening of Brainard Field in Hartford in October 1922, efforts were immediately launched to secure the Air Service unit of the 43d Division for the State of Connecticut. Rhode Island, apparently without a great deal of argument, soon relinquished its claim and the squadron was reassigned to Connecticut as the 118th Observation Squadron, Connecticut National Guard.

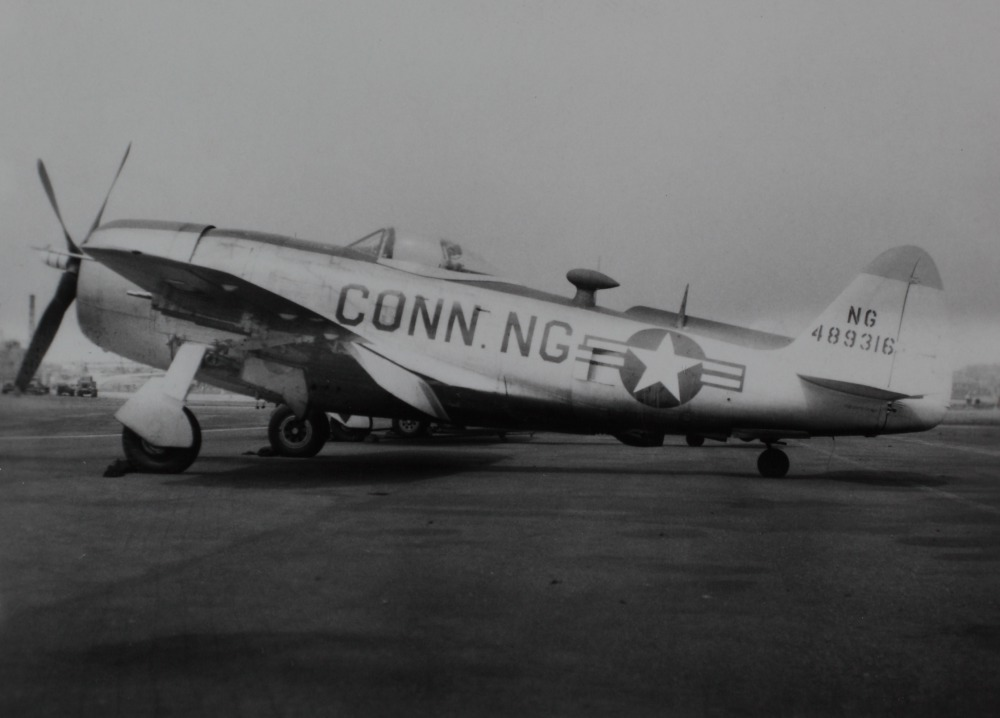
P-47N Thunderbolt of the 118th Fighter Squadron, 103rd Fighter Group

When the squadron was officially organized on 1 November 1923, there were some 66 officers and enlisted men officially on board. During the 1920s and 1930s, the 118th "grew and prospered". Originally issued with obsolete Curtiss JN-4 "Jennies" left over from World War I, the unit was later equipped with experimental Curtiss OX-12's with rotary engines and a swept-wing design. The squadron, or elements thereof, called up to perform the following state duties: riot control at the textile workers strike at Putnam, CT, in September 1934; and flood relief at Hartford, CT, 19 March-1 April 1936. Conducted summer training at Mitchell Field, NY, or Trumbull Field, CT. Detachments were sent some years to fly spotter missions during the summer training of the 192d Field Artillery Regiment.

The 118th entered the 1940s with war in Europe already a reality and eventual U.S. involvement becoming more and more likely. The 118th was preparing to meet that eventuality. In 1940 the squadron was detached from the 43rd Division to become a part of I Army Corps, Aviation. Simultaneously, plans were being drawn up "for the entire unit to move to Jacksonville, Florida for intensive training over a period of an entire year".

=== Connecticut Air National Guard ===
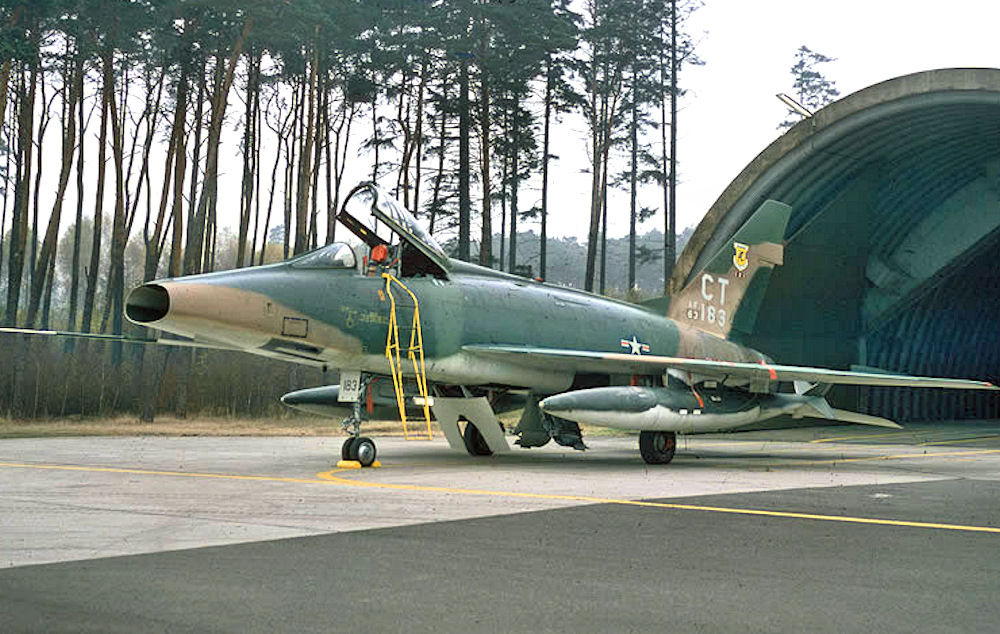
F-100D Super Sabre of the 118th Tactical Fighter Squadron in 1985

On 24 May 1946, the United States Army Air Forces, in response to dramatic postwar military budget cuts imposed by President Harry S. Truman, allocated inactive unit designations to the National Guard Bureau for the formation of an Air Force National Guard. These unit designations were allotted and transferred to various State National Guard bureaus to provide them unit designations to re-establish them as Air National Guard units.

The modern Connecticut ANG received federal recognition on 7 August 1946 as the 103d Fighter Group at Bradley Army Airfield, Windsor Locks. The mission of the 103d Fighter Group was the air defense of Connecticut. It was assigned the 118th Fighter Squadron, equipped with F-47D Thunderbolts. 18 September 1947, however, is considered the Connecticut Air National Guard's official birth concurrent with the establishment of the United States Air Force as a separate branch of the United States military under the National Security Act.

During the Korean War, the Connecticut Air National Guard was federalized on 10 February 1951 with the 103d Fighter Group being re-designated as the 103d Fighter-Interceptor Group, and the 103d Fighter-Interceptor Wing being established by Air Defense Command on 2 March 1951. The 118th also being re-designated as a Fighter-Interceptor squadron.

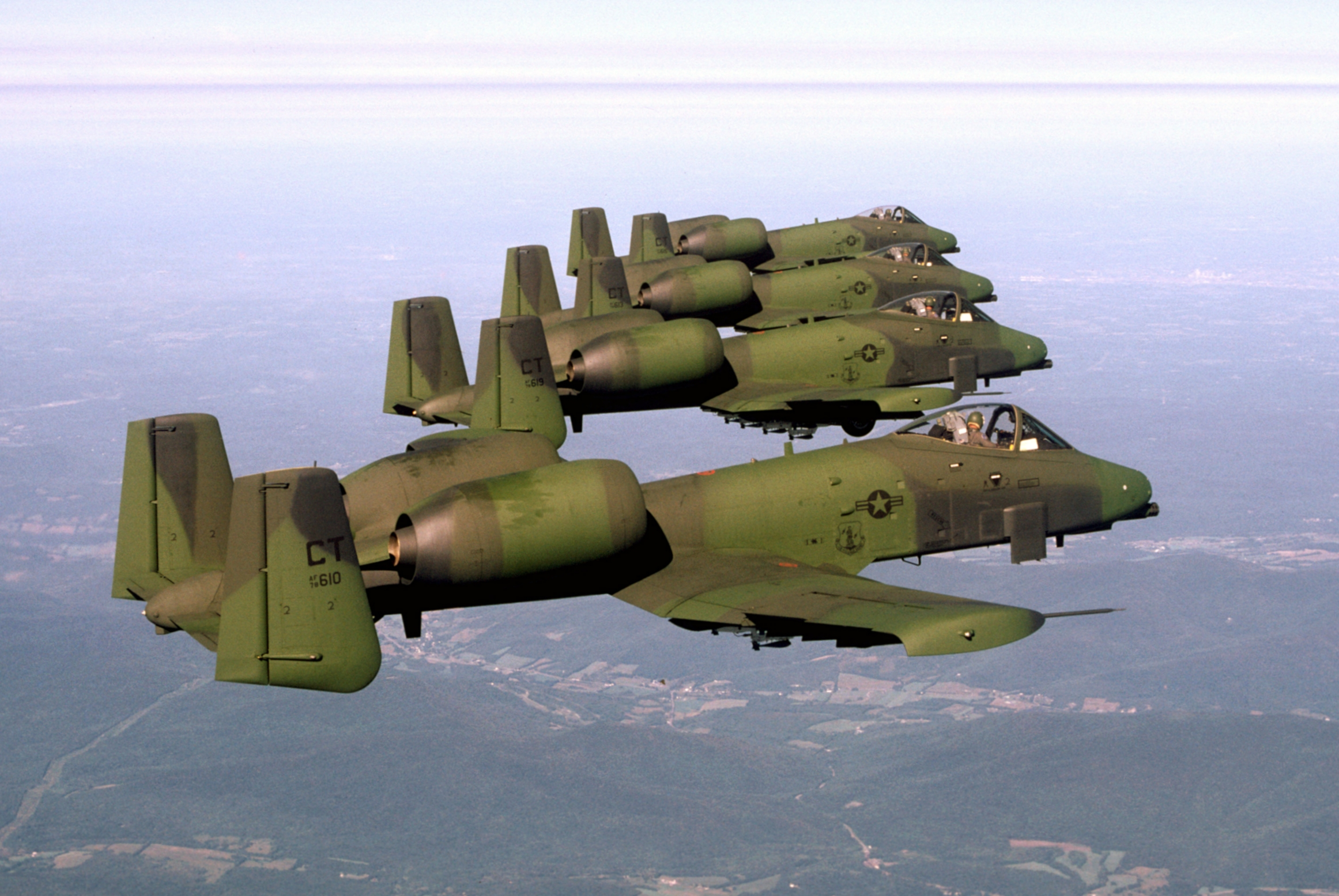
A-10 Thunderbolt II's of the 118th Tactical Fighter Squadron, 1989

The 103d was assigned to the Air Defense Command Eastern Air Defense Force and moved to Suffolk County AFB, New York on 1 June 1951, flying air defense missions with their F-47D Thunderbolts. On 1 February 1952 the 103d FIW and assigned groups were inactivated by ADC, the 118th FIS being assigned to the 4709th Air Defense Wing at McGuire AFB, New Jersey. During its period of federalization, the 118th FIS transferred many of its pilots and ground support personnel to Fifth Air Force, where they served in combat in Korea.

Until 2008, the organization was known as the 103rd Fighter Wing (103 FW), operationally-gained by the Air Combat Command (ACC) and equipped with A-10 Thunderbolt aircraft. As a result of Base Realignment and Closure (BRAC) actions, the wing's A-10 fighter aircraft were reassigned to other units and the 103rd reequipped with C-21 Learjet aircraft as a "placeholder" flying mission under the Air National Guard's VANGUARD program until the 103rd's next flying mission could be determined. Following this change in mission, the unit was redesignated the 103rd Airlift Wing and placed under the operational claimancy of Air Mobility Command (AMC). The 103d Airlift Wing is based in East Granby at the Bradley Air National Guard Base at Bradley International Airport.

== Notable personnel ==
- Jack Swigert, the Apollo 13 astronaut (April 1960 to October 1965).
