= Francis J. Evon Jr. =

United States Army general

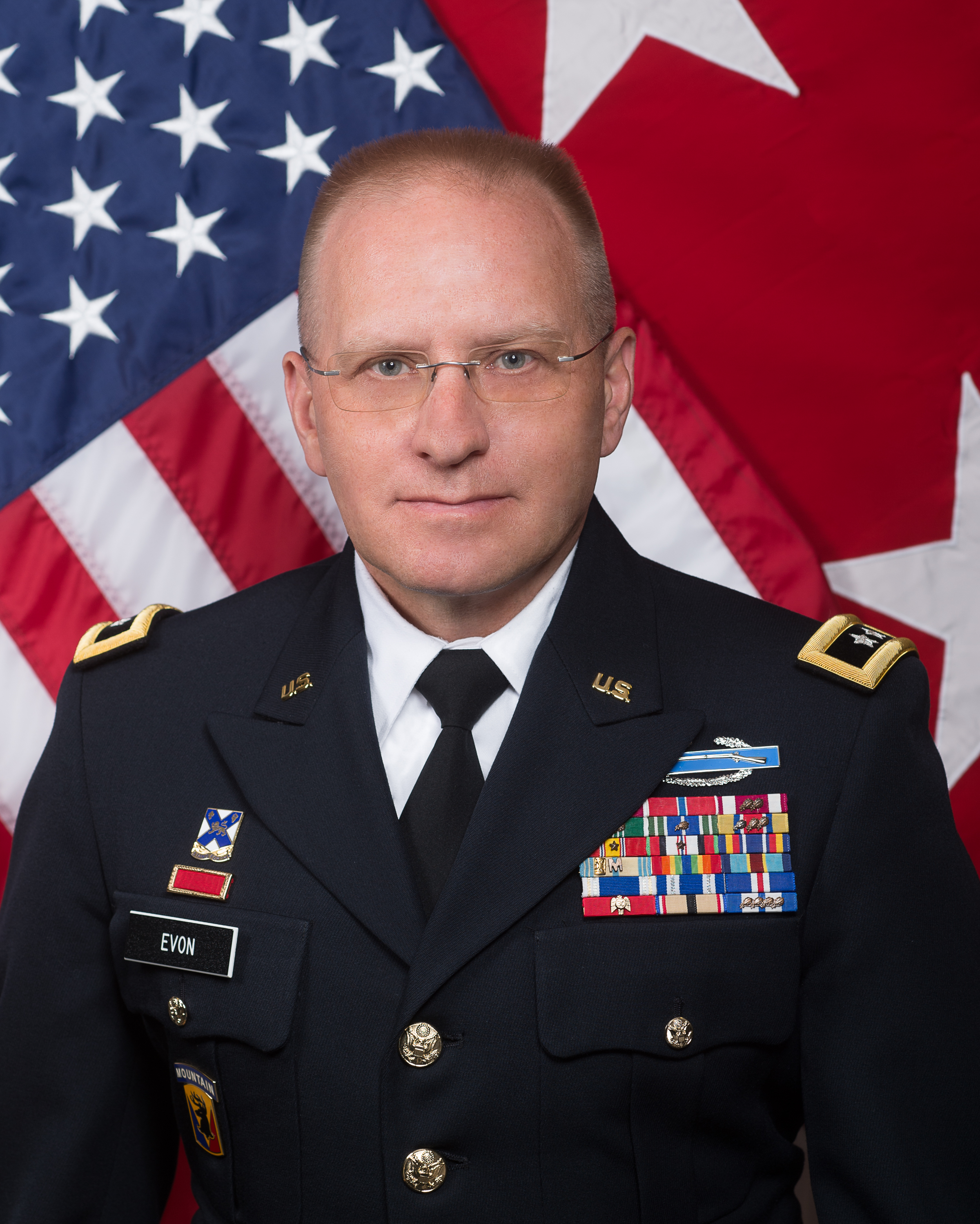
- Major General Evon
- Born: March 18, 1967 (age 59); Waterbury, Connecticut
- Military career
- Allegiance: United States; State of Connecticut
- Branch: United States Army
- Service years: 1985 – present
- Rank: Major General
- Commands: Connecticut National Guard; 1st Battalion, 102d Infantry Regiment
- Conflicts: Operation Enduring Freedom
- Awards: Legion of Merit; Bronze Star

Major General Francis J. Evon Jr. is the adjutant general of the Connecticut National Guard. He is responsible to the governor and the chief of the National Guard Bureau, for providing operationally trained, equipped and mission-ready forces to support both U.S. mobilization requirements and state emergency operations to include developing and coordinating counter terrorism and domestic preparedness contingencies for the State of Connecticut. He implements policies, programs, and plans as the direct link to all state assigned National Guard resources, providing information and evaluation, issue resolution and action recommendations. General Evon began his military career in 1985 as an enlisted Anti-Tank Crewman in the Combat Support Company, 2nd Battalion, 102nd Infantry of the Connecticut Army National Guard. He was commissioned through the Army Reserve Officers’ Training Corps in 1989. Major General Evon has held command leadership positions at the company, battalion, and brigade levels. He served as commander of the 1st Battalion, 102d Infantry Regiment in Afghanistan during Operation Enduring Freedom from November 2009 to November 2010. Prior to his current assignment, General Evon served as the assistant adjutant general for the Connecticut Army National Guard. His promotion to major general was confirmed at the federal level by the U.S. Senate on May 23, 2019.

== Education ==
1989 Bachelor of Science, Finance, University of Connecticut, Storrs, Connecticut
2013 Master of Strategic Studies, United States Army War College, Carlisle Barracks, Carlisle, Pennsylvania

== Assignments ==
1. Oct. 1989 – Nov. 1991 Rifle Platoon Leader, Company C (-), 1st Battalion, 102d Infantry, 43rd Infantry Brigade, 26th Infantry Division, Bristol, Connecticut
2. Nov. 1991 – Oct. 1992 Rifle Platoon Leader, Detachment 1, Company C (-), 1st Battalion, 102nd Infantry, 43rd Infantry Brigade, 26th Infantry Division, Torrington, Connecticut
3. Oct. 1992 – Nov. 1994 Mortar Platoon Leader, Company C, 1st Battalion, 102nd Infantry, 43rd Infantry Brigade, 26th Infantry Division, Bristol, Connecticut
4. Nov. 1994 – Jul. 1996 Executive Officer, Company C, 1st Battalion, 102nd Infantry, 43rd Infantry Brigade, 26th Infantry Division, Bristol, Connecticut
5. Jul. 1996 – Oct. 1998 Company Commander, Company C, 1st Battalion, 102nd Infantry, 43rd Infantry Brigade, 26th Infantry Division, Bristol, Connecticut
6. Oct. 1998 – Oct. 1999 Battalion S-1, 1st Battalion, 102nd Infantry, 43rd Infantry Brigade, 26th Infantry Division, New Haven, Connecticut
7. Oct. 1999 – Jan. 2001 Battalion S-4, 1st Battalion, 102nd Infantry, 43rd Infantry Brigade, 26th Infantry Division, New Haven, Connecticut
8. Jan. 2001 – Mar. 2002 Brigade S-2, Headquarters, 85th Troop Command, State Area Command, New London, Connecticut
9. Mar. 2002 – Apr. 2003 Administrative Officer, Headquarters, 169th Leadership Regiment, Connecticut Army National Guard, Niantic, Connecticut
10. Apr. 2003 – Jun. 2003 Assistant Operations Officer, Headquarters, 169th Leadership Regiment, Connecticut Army National Guard, Niantic, Connecticut
11. Jun. 2003 – Dec. 2003 Chief, Force Projection Officer, HHD STARC (-), Connecticut Army National Guard, Hartford, Connecticut
12. Dec. 2003 – Sep. 2007 Executive Officer, Joint Forces Headquarters, Connecticut Army National Guard, Hartford, Connecticut
13. Sep. 2007 – Mar. 2011 Commander, 102nd Infantry, 86th Infantry Brigade Combat Team (MTN), 42nd Infantry Division, New Haven, Connecticut
14. Nov. 2009 – Jan. 2011 Commander, 1st Battalion 102nd Infantry, Afghanistan
15. Mar. 2011 – Dec. 2011 J7/Director of Joint Training, Joint Forces Headquarters, Connecticut National Guard, Hartford, Connecticut
16. Dec. 2011 – Aug. 2012 Deputy Chief of Staff, Personnel/ G1, Joint Forces Headquarters, Connecticut National Guard, Hartford, Connecticut
17. Aug. 2012 – Oct. 2014 Commander, 85th Troop Command, Connecticut Army National Guard, Niantic, Connecticut
18. Oct. 2014 – Aug. 2016 Deputy Chief of Staff, Personnel/ G1, Joint Forces Headquarters, Connecticut National Guard, Hartford, Connecticut
19. Aug. 2016 – Jun. 2018 Assistant Adjutant General, Connecticut Joint Force Headquarters, Hartford, Connecticut
20. Jul. 2018 – present, The Adjutant General – Connecticut, Hartford, Connecticut

== Awards and decorations ==
Legion of Merit
Bronze Star
Meritorious Service Medal with two bronze oak leaf clusters
Army Commendation Medal with two bronze oak leaf clusters
Army Achievement Medal
Meritorious Unit Commendation
National Defense Service Medal with bronze service star
Afghanistan Campaign Medal with one service star
Global War on Terrorism Service Medal
Army Service Ribbon
Armed Forces Reserve Medal with Gold Hourglass and M Device
Overseas Service Ribbon
NATO Medal

== Effective dates of promotion ==
Promotions
Insignia	Rank	Date
	Major General	May 23, 2019
	Brigadier General	December 7, 2016
	Colonel	May 24, 2012
	Lieutenant Colonel	September 27, 2006
	Major	April 9, 2002
	Captain	August 1, 1996
	First Lieutenant	May 23, 1992
	Second Lieutenant	May 30, 1989

Military offices
Preceded by Thaddeus J. Martin	Connecticut Adjutant General; July 1, 2018 – present	Incumbent
