= 8th Connecticut Infantry Regiment =

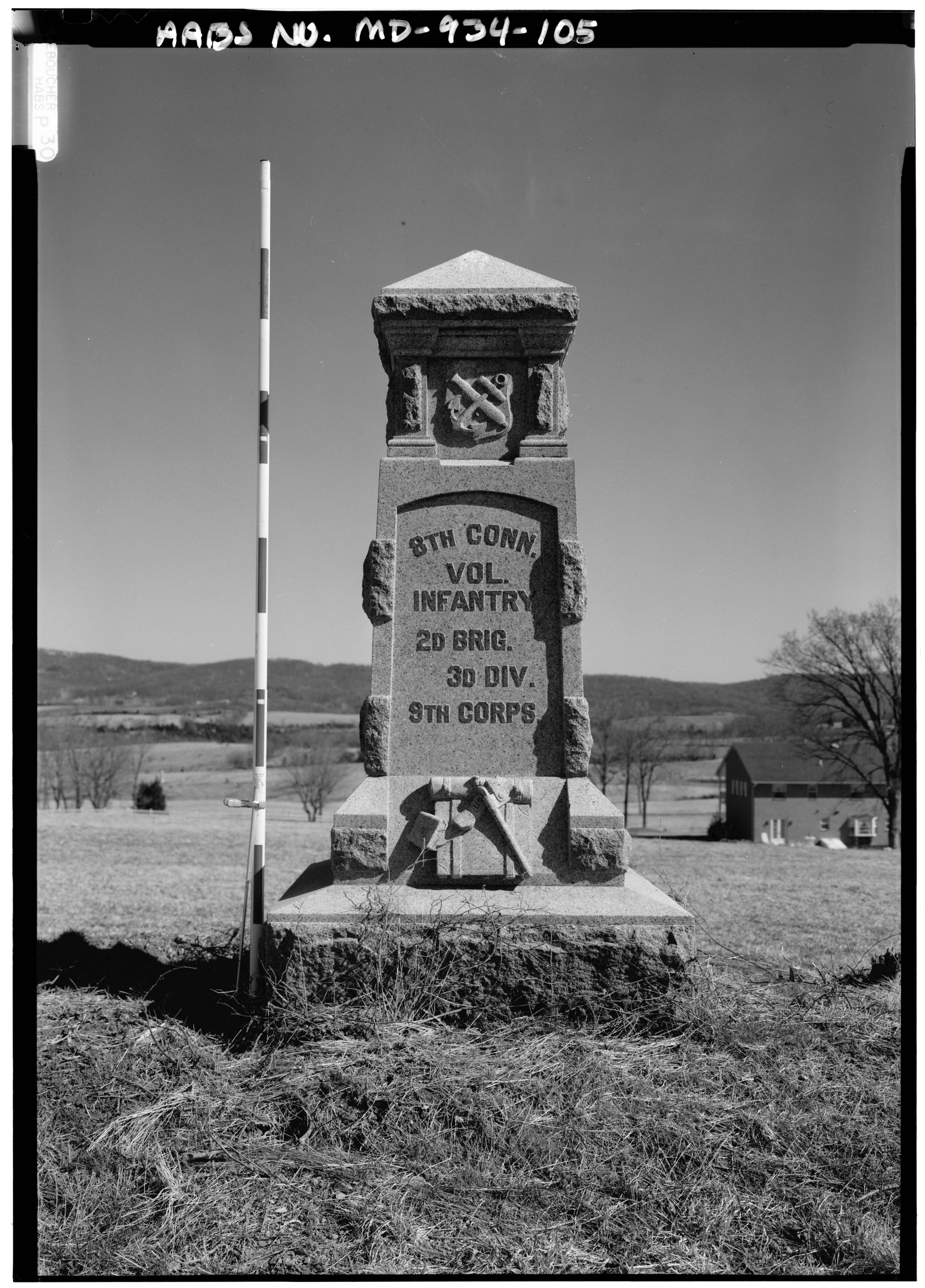
- 8th Connecticut Volunteer Infantry Monument at the Antietam National Battlefield
- Active: 1861-1865
- Country: United States
- Allegiance: Union
- Branch: United States Army
- Type: Infantry
- Engagements: Battle of New Bern; Battle of Fort Macon; Battle of South Mountain; Battle of Antietam; Battle of Fredericksburg; Battle of Walthall Junction; Battle of Fort Darling; Battle of Cold Harbor; Siege of Petersburg

Commanders
- Colonel: Edward Harland

The 8th Connecticut Infantry Regiment was an infantry regiment that fought in the Union Army during the American Civil War.

== History ==
The 8th Connecticut Infantry Regiment was organized at Camp Buckingham, Hartford, in September, 1861, It was first commanded by Colonel Edward Harland of Norwich. The regiment drew most of its enlisted men from northern Hartford and Litchfield counties and was composed mostly of merchants and farmers from the Housatonic River and Connecticut River Valleys south to near New Milford and north to the Massachusetts state line and west to present day Hartford. The regiment left Hartford October 17, 1861, for a camp of instruction at Jamaica, Long Island, and there received its colors. It proceeded to Annapolis, where it spent the fall. Early in January, 1862, the Eighth sailed with the Burnside Expedition to North Carolina as part of the IX Corps. It was held in reserve during the Battle of Roanoke Island.

It was engaged in the Battle of New Bern, on March 14, 1862. The Eighth then participated in the successful siege of Fort Macon, during the March and April 1862. From there the regiment proceeded to Fredericksburg in July, 1862. On September 1 the Eighth accompanied the Union Army to Washington, and on September 8, joined the Maryland Campaign, including action at South Mountain.

The Battle of Antietam on September 17, 1862, resulted in a greater number of casualties for the regiment than any other engagement of the war. Along with other regiments of Harland's Brigade, the Eighth marched downstream from Burnside's Bridge, and crossed the Antietam at Snaveley's Ford. They proceeded up the slopes towards Sharpsburg to attack the Confederates, finally being repulsed by reinforcements under Gen. A. P. Hill at the close of the day's fighting.

After Antietam, the Eighth stayed in Pleasant Valley until marching back to Fredericksburg, with the Army of the Potomac, assuming their old camps at the Lacey House. Soon it was involved in the contested crossing of the Rappahannock, where over 80 men of the Eighth volunteered to assist the engineers in building the pontoon bridges. The Battle of Fredericksburg followed on December 13, 1862, and they were moved towards Marye's Heights in the last assault. However darkness fell and the Eighth only advanced as far as the bed of the Richmond, Fredericksburg and Potomac Railroad, never having been heavily engaged.

Following their participation in Burnside's Mud March, the Eighth left of the IX Corps early in 1863, and went to Newport News, then to Suffolk, Virginia. They participated in the siege there for several months. It was there that the Eighth, now under Col. John Ward, attacked Fort Huger and took it by surprise in a daring raid. The regiment remained in the Portsmouth area during the summer, and participated in the "Blackberry Raid" demonstration in force.

In December 1863, 310 original members of the regiment re-enlisted, and in January were sent home on veteran furloughs. Those who had volunteered in 1862 and 1863 were temporarily transferred to the 15th Connecticut and remained in southeastern Virginia.

The year of 1864 found the Eighth transferred to the XVIII Corps, Army of the James. There they participated in the battles of Walthall Junction, Fort Darling, Drewry's Bluff, Cold Harbor, and the siege of Petersburg. In September, they served on Bermuda Hundred, and across the James River. September 29 they fought at the battles of Fort Harrison and Chaffin's Farm, which was their last engagement of the war.

The Eighth was with the 24th Corps, Army of the James in its final advance on Richmond in the spring of 1865. After Gen. Lee's surrender at Appomattox, the Eighth moved to Lynchburg, Virginia, where it performed police and provost duties until it was mustered out of service December 12, 1865, serving a longer term than all but two other Connecticut regiments.

== Principal engagements ==
- New Bern, N.C., March 17, 1862
- Fort Macon, N.C., April 1862
- Antietam, Md., September 17, 1862
- Fredericksburg, Va., December 11 and 13, 1862
- Fort Huger, Va., April 11 and April 19, 1863
- Walthall Junction, Va., May 7, 1864
- Fort Darling or 2d Drewry's Bluff, Va., May 12 to May 16, 1864
- Cold Harbor, Va., June 1 to 10 1864
- near Petersburg, Va., June 15 to 17, 1864, and June 17 to September 28, 1864
- Fort Harrison, Va., September 29 to October 24, 1864

== Casualties ==
- Killed and mortally wounded: 112 officers and men
- Died of disease: 132 officers and men
- Total: 244 officers and men

== See also ==
- List of Connecticut Civil War units
