= Frederick E. Camp =

Twenty-fifth Adjutant General of Connecticut, United States

General Frederick E. Camp
- Born: July 1, 1832; Durham, CT
- Died: October 8, 1891 (aged 59); Middletown, CT
- Military career
- Allegiance: United States
- Branch: United States Army
- Rank: Major General
- Commands: Connecticut State Militia; Second Brigade, Connecticut Militia
- Website: www.ct.gov/mil

Frederick E. Camp, was born in Durham, Connecticut on July 1, 1832, was the twenty-fifth Adjutant General of the State of Connecticut. He was a treasurer of the soldier's hospital board. He also worked in the office of Boston and New York Air line Railroad Company at New Haven, Connecticut. Camp also became secretary and treasurer of the Middletown Gas Light Company, which he held until he died. Camp was a republican and a member of the state central committee from 1884 to 1888. In 1877 until 1881 he was a city clerk and treasurer of Middletown, Connecticut.

== Military career ==
At the outbreak of the rebellion Camp enlisted in Company F. Twenty- fourth Connecticut Volunteers and at the muster on November 18, 1862, became second lieutenant of the company. On April 16, 1862, Camp was promoted first-lieutenant. On June 14, 1863, Camp was wounded at Port Hudson. LA and mustered out of the service. January 26, 1864, Camp was appointed captain of Company D. Twenty Ninth Connecticut Volunteers and was later promoted to major on November 24, 1864. He was appointed lieutenant –colonel of the Twenty-ninth United States Colored Infantry on January 1, 1865, and then discharged on November 6, 1865. When Camp became second lieutenant, later that day he also became first lieutenant of the Fourteenth Regiment of the United States Infantry. Camp was transferred to Thirty-second United States Infantry on September 21, 1866. He was appointed to captain, December 12, 1866. From April 19, 1868, to January 1, 1871, Camp was unassigned due to army being reorganized. Camp was assigned to Second United States Infantry, with this regiment he served in Arizona and in Alabama. He was resigned on July 30, 1871. On August 11, 1876, he was appointed captain of Company 11, Second Regiment C.N.G., and was resigned March 10, 1880. On April 15, 1880, he was appointed adjutant of the Second Regiment and was resigned January 6, 1881, to accept the office of pay master-general on Governor Bigelow's staff from which he was discharged on January 3, 1883. Camp's last appointment was Connecticut Adjutant General by Governor Lounsbury'staff from 1887 to 1888.

== Personal life ==
Frederick E. Camp never got married. Camp died on October 8, 1891, in Middletown, Connecticut due to long and painful illnesses. He was a companionable man and had many friends.

Military offices
Preceded by Stephen E. Smith	Connecticut Adjutant General; 1887–1888	Succeeded by Lucius A. Barbour
