= George M. Harmon =

General George M. Harmon
- Born: December 2, 1837; Brookfield, Massachusetts, United States
- Died: November 21, 1910 (aged 72); New Haven, Connecticut, United States
- Spouse: Mary Ann Baldwin (m. 1840; died 1904)
- Military career
- Allegiance: United States
- Branch: United States Army
- Rank: Major General
- Commands: Connecticut State Militia; Second Brigade, Connecticut Militia
- Website: www.ct.gov/mil

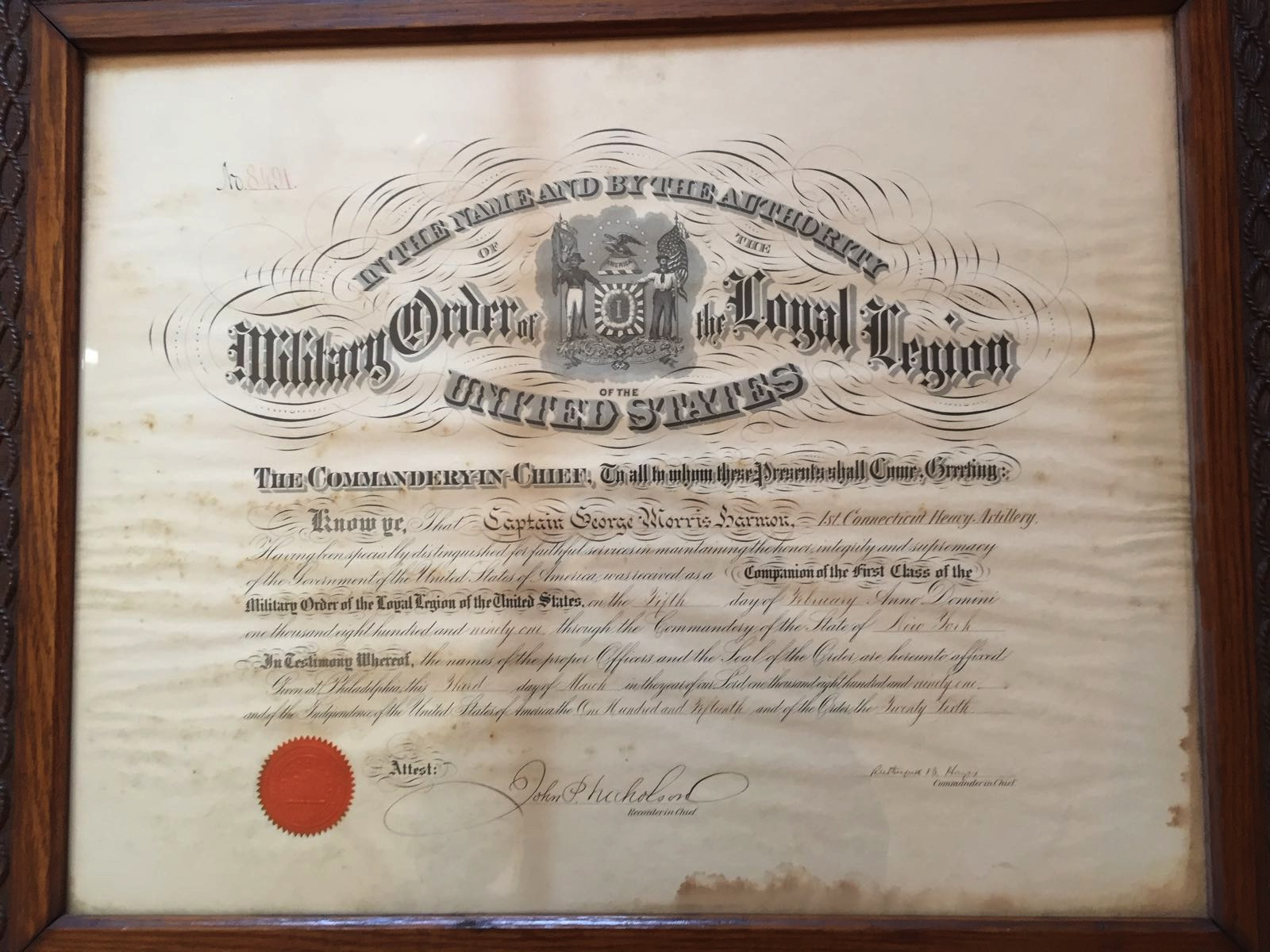
Harmon's Enrollment Certificate for the Loyal Legion issued in 1891 and signed by President Rutherford B. Hayes

George M. Harmon (2 December 1837 – 21 December 1910) was the twenty second Adjutant General of the State of Connecticut born in Brookfield, Massachusetts. After the war he resumed the manufacture of corsets under the firm name of Foy&Harmon. The firm grew to be one of the largest in putting out corset material having branches in New York and Boston. He afterwards had a commission business in Boston, which was one of the largest in the world in marketing materials for the making of corsets. In 1873 and 1874 Harmon was police commissioner in the city of New Haven. In 1880 he was chairman of the republic state committee. Harmon was a member of the Military Order of the Loyal Legion of the United States for New York and had membership in a number of organizations in that state.

== Military career ==
In 1861, at the start of the Civil War, Harmon enlisted in the Fourth Connecticut Infantry, which afterwards became a part of the First Connecticut Heavy Artillery, and rose from a lieutenant to a captain. He participated in the battles of Yorktown, Hanover, Court House, Gaine Mills, and Malvern Hill. From 1881 to 1882, Captain Harmon was made Connecticut Adjutant General by Governor Bigelow.

== Personal life ==
Harmon got married twice. His second wife was Mary Ann Baldwin (1834–1904), and they had four sons and one daughter; Mary L. Harmon (1860–1887), George H. Harmon (1862–1882), William Charles Harmon Sr. (1869–1943), Frank W. Harmon (1871), and Edward F. Harmon (1874–1919). Harmon died on 21 November 1910, in New Haven, Connecticut.

Military offices
Preceded by Edward Harland	Connecticut Adjutant General; 1881–1882	Succeeded by Darius N. Couch
