= Connecticut Naval Militia =

The Connecticut Naval Militia was a class of militia of the Armed Forces of the State of Connecticut along with the Connecticut National Guard, the Connecticut State Guard, and the Connecticut State Guard Reserve. The governor of Connecticut is authorized to organize a naval militia as a special force for coastal protection or other appropriate naval services per Connecticut General Statutes. The Connecticut Naval Militia has been inactive for several decades with no current membership.

At some point HMS Rose was requisitioned by the Connecticut General Assembly for use by the Naval Militia as a training ship, and maintained in Bridgeport by a private foundation, rather than with public funds. But after World War II and the consolidation of state naval militias into the US Naval Reserve, the Connecticut Naval Militia fell into obsolescence.
