= Connecticut Military Department =

State military agency of Connecticut, US

- Official Seal

Agency overview
- Formed: 1939
- Jurisdiction: Connecticut
- Headquarters: Hartford, Connecticut, US
- Agency executive: Major General Francis J. Evon, The Adjutant General, Connecticut National Guard
- Child agency: Connecticut State Militia

The Connecticut Military Department is a state agency of the government of Connecticut. Its primary components are the Connecticut Army National Guard, the Connecticut Air National Guard, and four companies of the state militia. The Military Department of the State of Connecticut traces its origins to May 11, 1637, when the "General Courts" (colonial assembly - legislature) established a military arm of the provincial government. In 1939, the State's Military Department was established to consolidate the offices of Adjutant General, Quartermaster General, Armory Board, and Armory Board Inspector.

== Mission ==
The Military Department of the State of Connecticut's principle public responsibility is to serve as the protector of American citizens of the State and their property in time of war, invasion, rebellion, riot or disaster. It serves as the main resource for the governor in ensuring public safety in a variety of emergencies.

The Connecticut National Guard as the state militia also has a federal constitutional mission to support the president of the United States as commander-in-chief of the Armed Forces of the United States and the federal government in times of war or national emergencies.

== Components ==
=== Connecticut National Guard ===
The Constitution of the United States specifically grants the U.S. Congress the power to "raise armies." The U.S. Army, Navy, Air Force are armies raised under this provision. Additionally, the States, under the 2nd and 10th Amendments, have the right to raise their own armies, historically known as militias, today known as a State Defense Force (SDF). After the civil war, many states reduced funding for their militias and military training programs causing the threat of a reduction in war preparedness. As a result, Congress decided to raise a new federal army to be jointly administered by the states alongside the state defense forces: that army is known as the National Guard of the United States. Like the state militia/SDF, the National Guard is typically administered by the governors. Unlike the militia/SDF, the National Guard may be deployed abroad without the permission of the state governor, whereas the militia/SDF is under the exclusive authority of the states except in the rare event of invasion of the United States or domestic insurrection as specified in Article I Section 8 of the U.S. Constitution.

Major General Francis J. Evon, Jr. is the current Connecticut Adjutant General (TAG).

==== Units ====
- 1st Battalion, 102nd Infantry Regiment, in New Haven, Connecticut (part of 86th Infantry Brigade Combat Team)
- 1st Battalion, 169th Aviation Regiment, in Windsor Locks, Connecticut
- 118th Multifunctional Medical Battalion, in Middletown, Connecticut
- 143rd Combat Service Support Battalion, in Waterbury, Connecticut
- 192nd Military Police Battalion, in Niantic, Connecticut
- 192nd Engineer Battalion, in Stratford, Connecticut

==== Connecticut Air National Guard ====
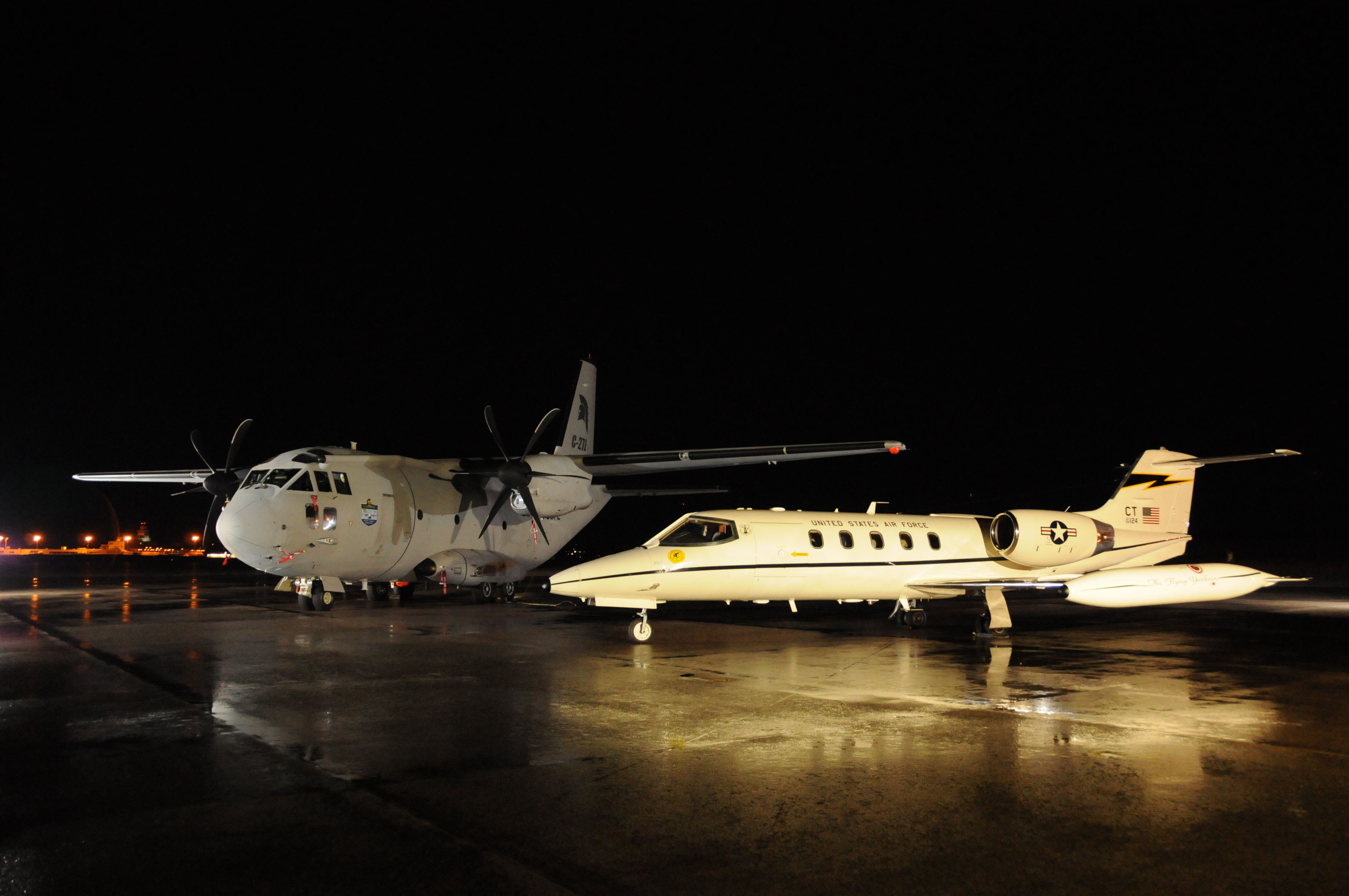
A C-21A of the Connecticut Air National Guard sits beside a C-27 during an Alenia familiarisation visit to Bradley ANGB

The Connecticut Air National Guard traces its history back to World War I with the beginnings also of the United States Army Air Service. It comprises approximately 1,200 airmen and officers assigned to the 103rd Airlift Wing and 103rd Air Control Squadron. The 103rd Airlift Wing is based in East Granby at the Bradley Air National Guard Base at Bradley International Airport.

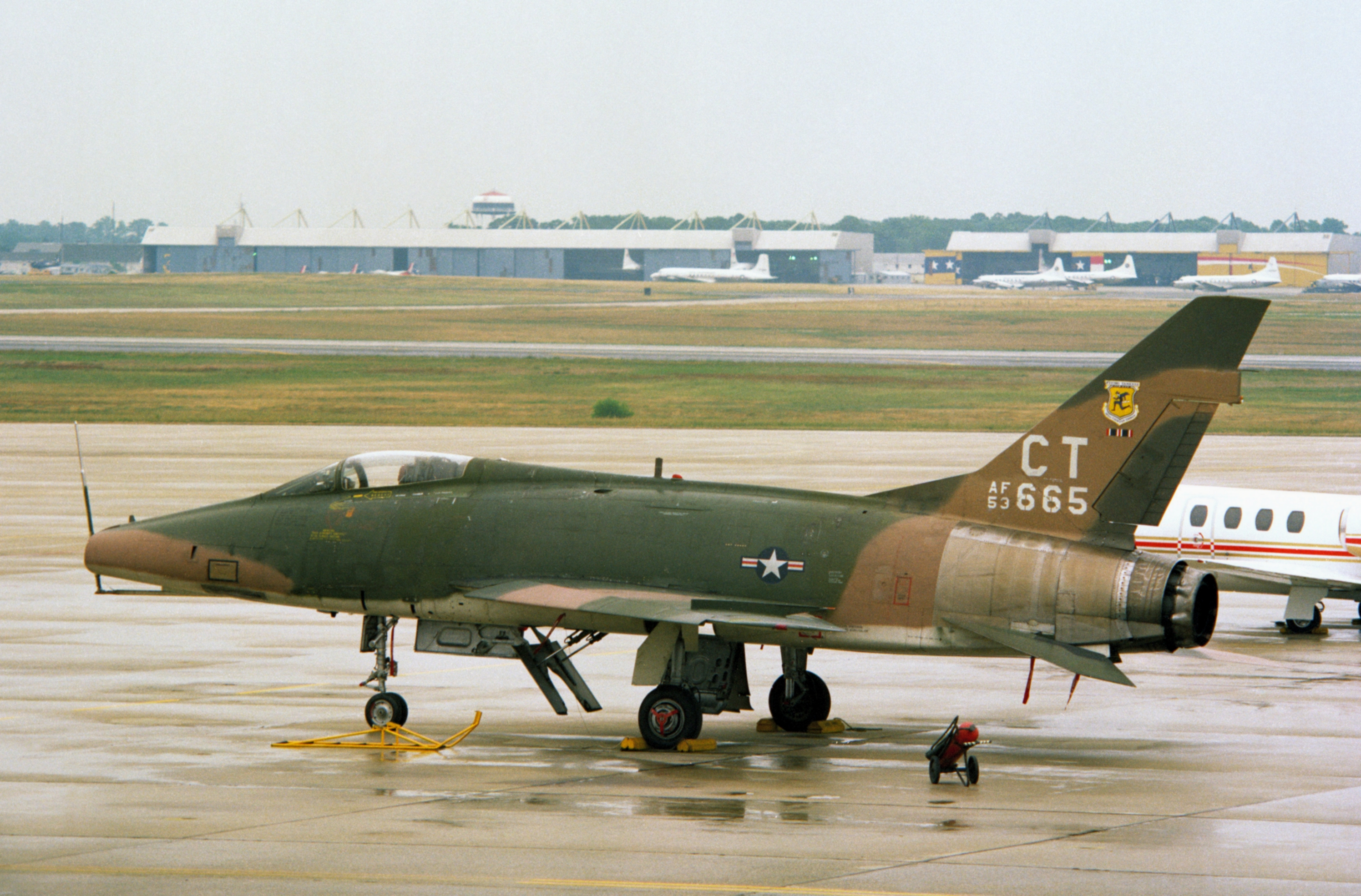
An F-100 of the Connecticut Air National Guard, 1976

Known as the "Flying Yankees", the 103rd Airlift Wing is the third-oldest Air National Guard unit in the United States with a history dating back to World War I. Until 2008, the organization was known as the 103rd Fighter Wing (103 FW), operationally gained by the Air Combat Command (ACC) and equipped with A-10 Thunderbolt aircraft. As a result of Base Realignment and Closure (BRAC) actions, the wing's A-10 fighter aircraft were reassigned to other units and the 103rd reequipped with C-21 Learjet aircraft as a "placeholder" flying mission under the Air National Guard's VANGUARD program until the 103rd's next flying mission could be determined. Following this change in mission, the unit was redesignated the 103rd Airlift Wing and placed under the operational claimancy of Air Mobility Command (AMC).

The 103rd Air Control Squadron is based in Orange, Connecticut, and is known as "Yankee Watch". The mission of the 103rd Air Control Squadron is real-time detection, identification and surveillance of air traffic for combat operations and homeland defense. The 103rd ACS is the oldest unit of its kind in the United States military.

The Connecticut Air National Guard counts one astronaut amongst its former members, Jack Swigert, who flew on Apollo 13. Swigert served with the CT ANG from April 1960 to October 1965.

Brigadier General Daniel L Peabody is the current Assistant Adjutant General-Air, for the CT ANG.

=== Connecticut State Guard ===
The Connecticut State Guard is the organized militia portion of the state military. As a State Defense Force it is a military entity authorized by both the State Code of Connecticut and Executive Order. The State Defense Force (SDF) is the state's authorized militia and assumes the state mission of the Connecticut National Guard in the event the Guard is mobilized. The SDF comprises retired active and reserve military personnel and selected professional persons who volunteer their time and talents in further service to their state.

Connecticut's state defense force consists of four active units known as the Governor's Guards. There are two foot guard units and two horse guard units which preserve the lineage and heritage of Connecticut's infantry and cavalry units since the colonial period. While all four companies are primarily ceremonial, the horse companies do drill in mounted search and rescue. The First Company of the Horse Guard was created in 1788 as the Independent Volunteer Troop of Horse Guards in Hartford. A second Horse Guard company was created in 1808 in New Haven. Both were created to serve and protect the governor between his travels between New Haven and Hartford.

The Connecticut State Guard Reserve is currently inactive.

=== Connecticut Naval Militia ===
The Naval militia of the state remains an authorized force by state statute, but has been inactive for several decades with no current membership.

== Agency history ==
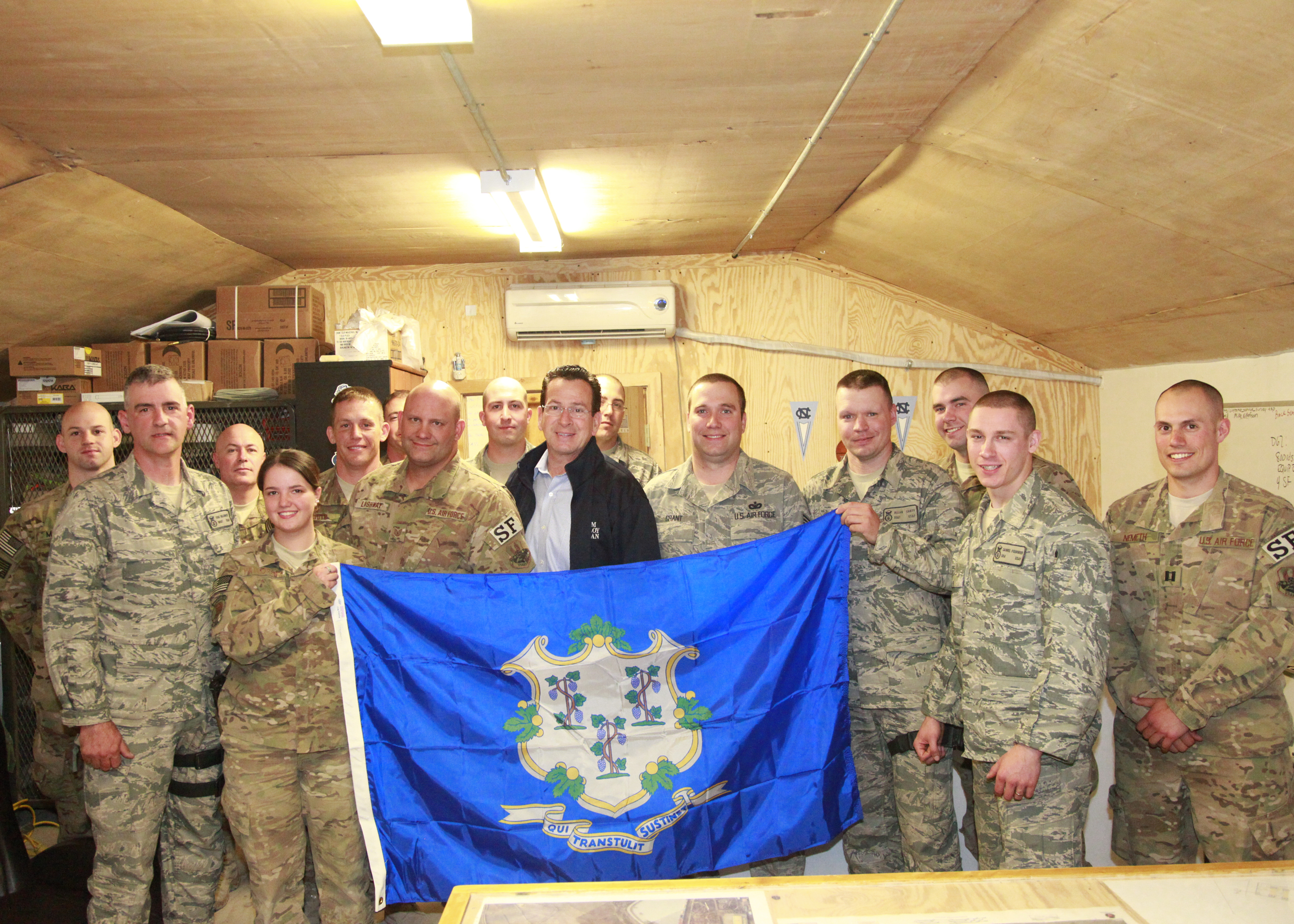
Governor Dannel Malloy with troops in Afghanistan

The Agency traces its roots to May 11, 1637, when the General Courts of the Colony of Connecticut established a military arm of the government. This arm of the colony's government was responsible for overseeing and regulating the militiamen of the colony. Agency personnel participated in several wars with Native Americans as well as with and against European colonial powers.

After the American Revolution, the new State of Connecticut established the office of the Adjutant General in 1792 to oversee the Armed Forces of the State. Units of the Connecticut State Militia participated in all wars of the United States.

The Connecticut Military Department was officially established as a state agency in 1939 by Chapter 345 of the Public Acts. The act consolidated the office of the Adjutant General, the Quartermaster General, the Armory Board and the Armory Board Inspector. In response to the coordination efforts of civil authorities to the Flood of 1955 in which Governor Abraham Ribicoff mobilized the National Guard, the Office of Civil Defense was created as a sub-agency of the Connecticut Military Department. Authority over the Office of Civil Defense was transferred to the Department of Public Safety in 1979 and back to the Military Department in 1999. In 2005, Public Act 04-219 created the Connecticut Department of Emergency Management and Homeland Security and once again removed overall domestic emergency response away from the Military Department. The Military Department remains as the largest force provider to the Governor during times of domestic emergencies.

== See also ==
- List of Connecticut Adjutant Generals
- Connecticut Air National Guard
- Connecticut Army National Guard
- Connecticut Naval Militia
- Governor's Guards
- Awards of the Connecticut National Guard
- List of United States militia units in the American Revolutionary War
