= Connecticut State Militia =

Armed forces of Connecticut, United States

The Connecticut State Militia are the armed forces of the state of Connecticut under the authority of the governor and the adjutant general of the state.

== Classes of Militia ==
The Connecticut State Militia is divided into two classes: the National Guard and the naval militia.

1. The Connecticut National Guard comprises both the Army and Air National Guard.
2. The organized militia consists of the Connecticut State Guard (the four units of the Governor's Guards are active), the Connecticut State Guard Reserve, and the Naval Militia.

== Private militias ==
In Connecticut, it is illegal to train or act as a militia without express authority of the governor or federal law.

== Sources ==
- Connecticut General Assembly. "Chapter 504 – Militia". Title 27. Armed Forces and Veterans – via CGA.ct.gov.
- "Fact Sheet: Unlawful Militias in Connecticut" (PDF). Institute for Constitutional Advocacy and Protection. Georgetown Law. 18 September 2020.
