= Senator Loomis =

Senator Loomis may refer to:

- Chauncey Loomis (1780s–1817), New York State Senate
- Chester Loomis (1789–1873), New York State Senate
- Dwight Loomis (1821–1903), Connecticut State Senate
- James Chaffee Loomis (1807–1877), Connecticut State Senate
- James H. Loomis (1823–1914), New York State Senate
- Orland Steen Loomis (1893–1942), Wisconsin State Senate
