= 1863 Connecticut gubernatorial election =

- April 6, 1863
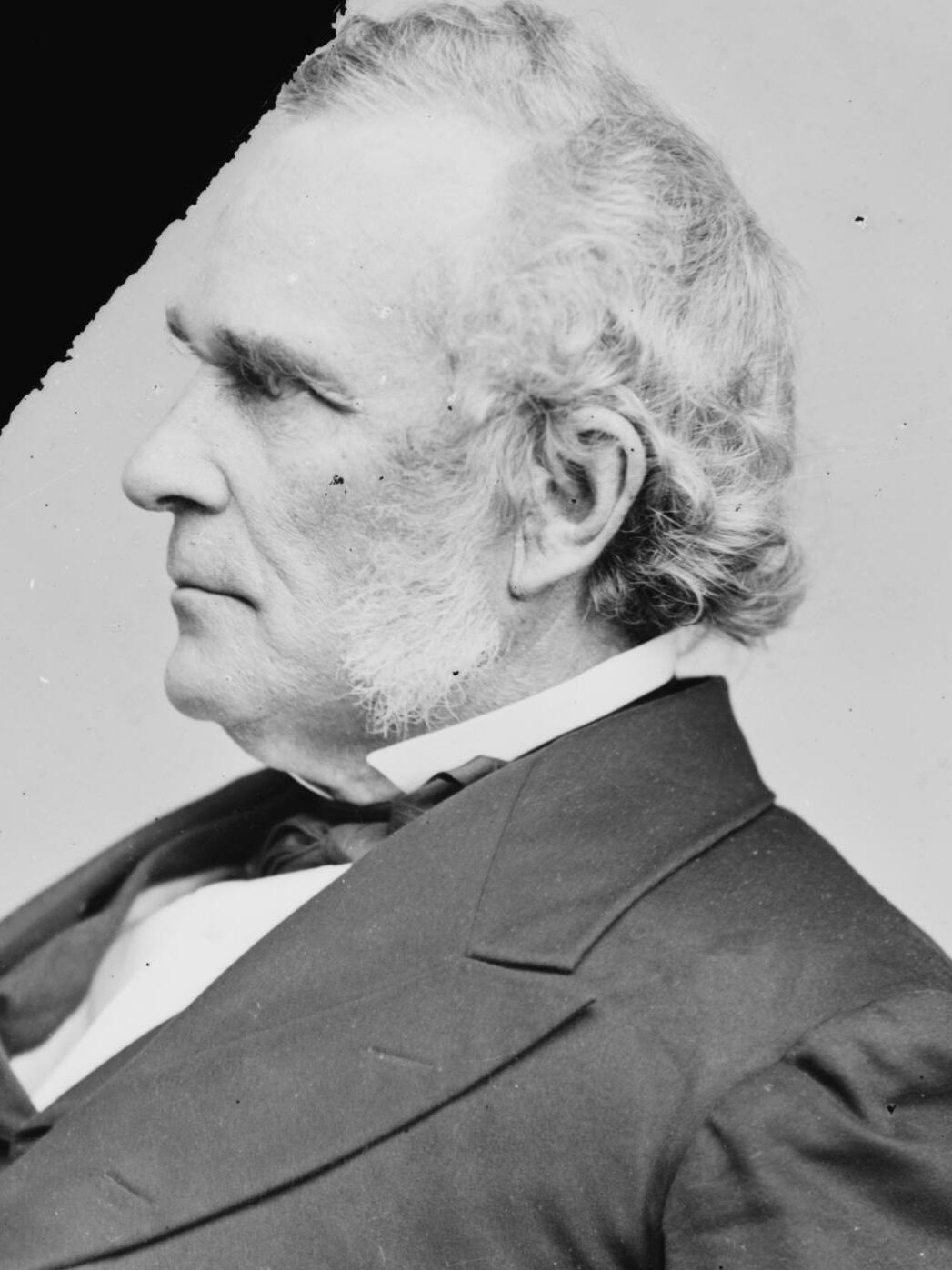

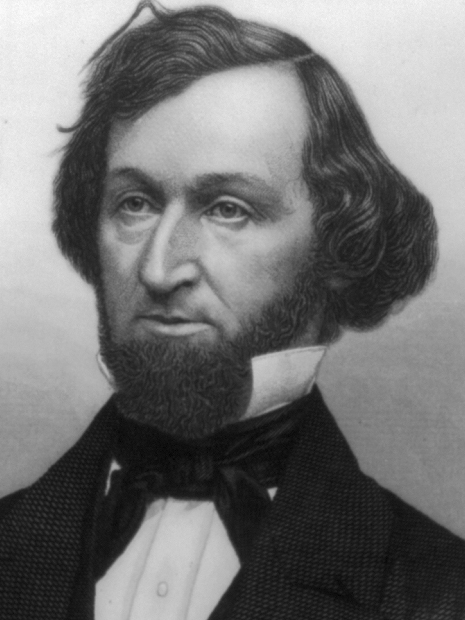
Nominee	William Alfred Buckingham	Thomas H. Seymour
Party	National Union	Democratic
Popular vote	41,034	38,397
Percentage	51.66%	48.34%
- Buckingham: 50–60% 60–70% 70–80% 80–90% Seymour: 50–60% 60–70% 70–80%
Governor before election
William Alfred Buckingham
National Union
Elected Governor
William Alfred Buckingham
National Union

The 1863 Connecticut gubernatorial election was held on April 6, 1863. It was a rematch of the 1860 Connecticut gubernatorial election. Incumbent governor and Union nominee William Alfred Buckingham defeated former governor and Democratic nominee Thomas H. Seymour with 51.64% of the vote.

== General election ==
=== Candidates ===
- William Alfred Buckingham, Union
- Thomas H. Seymour, Democratic

=== Results ===
1863 Connecticut gubernatorial election
Party	Candidate	Votes	%	±%
National Union	William Alfred Buckingham (incumbent)	41,033	51.66%	
Democratic	Thomas H. Seymour	38,397	48.34%	
Majority		2,636		
Turnout				
National Union hold		Swing		

== Bibliography ==
- Dell, Christopher (1975). Lincoln and the War Democrats: The Grand Erosion of Conservative Tradition. Rutherford, NJ: Farleigh Dickenson University Press. ISBN 978-0-8386-1466-2.
- Dubin, Michael J. (2014). United States Gubernatorial Elections, 1861-1911: The Official Results by State and County. Jefferson, NC: McFarland and Company.
