= 1865 Connecticut gubernatorial election =

- April 3, 1865
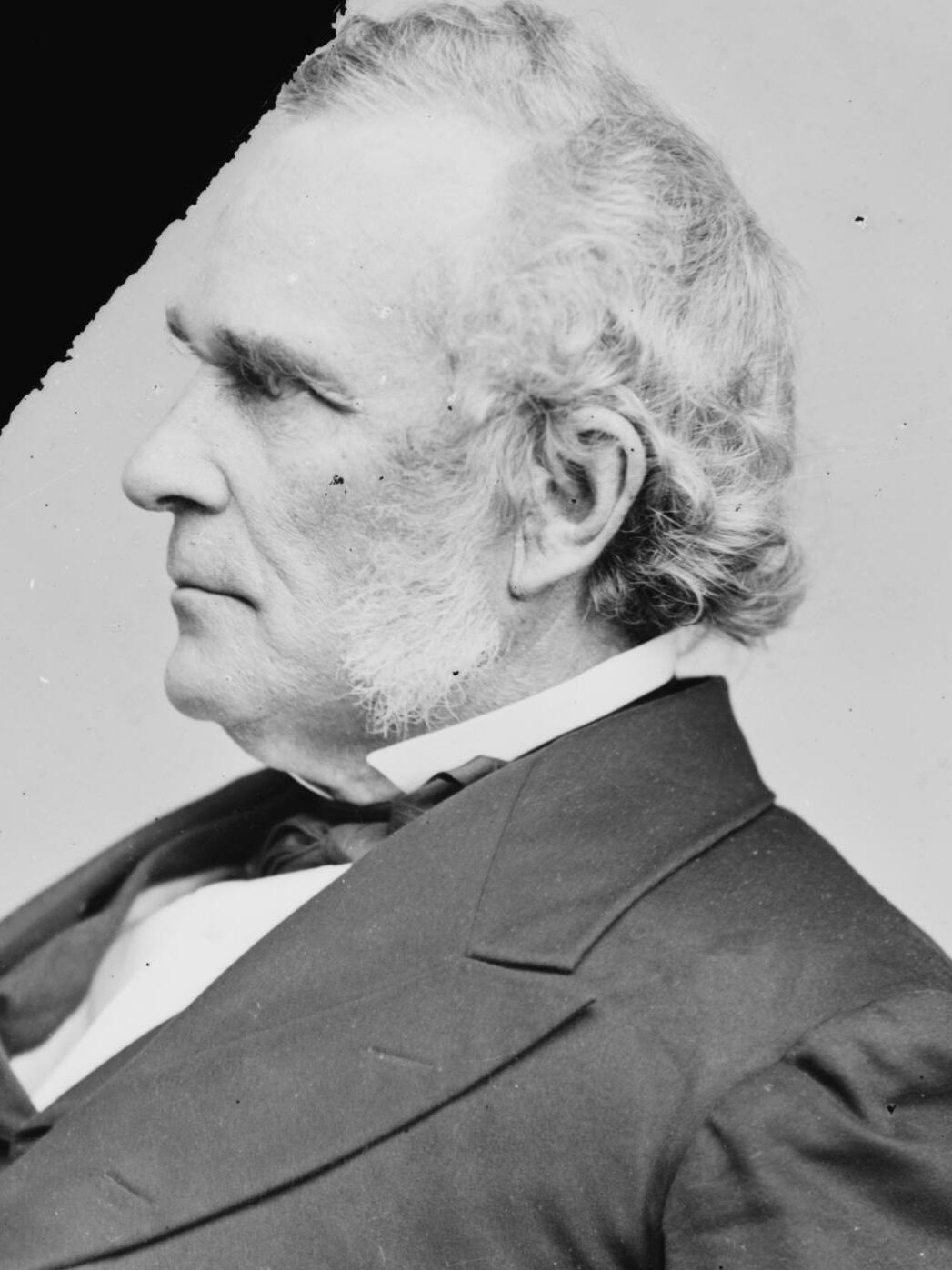

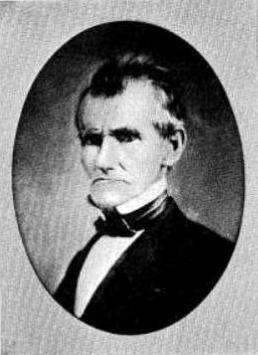
Nominee	William Alfred Buckingham	Origen S. Seymour
Party	National Union	Democratic
Popular vote	42,374	31,339
Percentage	57.48%	42.51%
- Buckingham: 50–60% 60–70% 70–80% 80–90% 90–100% Seymour: 50–60% 60–70% 70–80% Tie: 50%
Governor before election
William Alfred Buckingham
National Union
Elected Governor
William Alfred Buckingham
National Union

The 1865 Connecticut gubernatorial election was held on April 3, 1865, the last such election held during the American Civil War and the last election contested by the Republican–Union coalition. It was a rematch of the 1864 Connecticut gubernatorial election. Incumbent governor and National Union nominee William Alfred Buckingham defeated Democratic nominee Origen S. Seymour with 57.48% of the vote. It was the eighth and last of Buckingham's consecutive victories.

== General election ==
=== Candidates ===
Major party candidates

- William Alfred Buckingham, National Union
- Origen S. Seymour, Democratic

=== Results ===
1865 Connecticut gubernatorial election
Party	Candidate	Votes	%	±%
National Union	William Alfred Buckingham (incumbent)	42,374	57.48%	
Democratic	Origen S. Seymour	31,339	42.51%	
Other	Others	3	0.00%	
Majority		11,035		
Turnout				
National Union hold		Swing		
