= 1859 Connecticut gubernatorial election =

- April 4, 1859
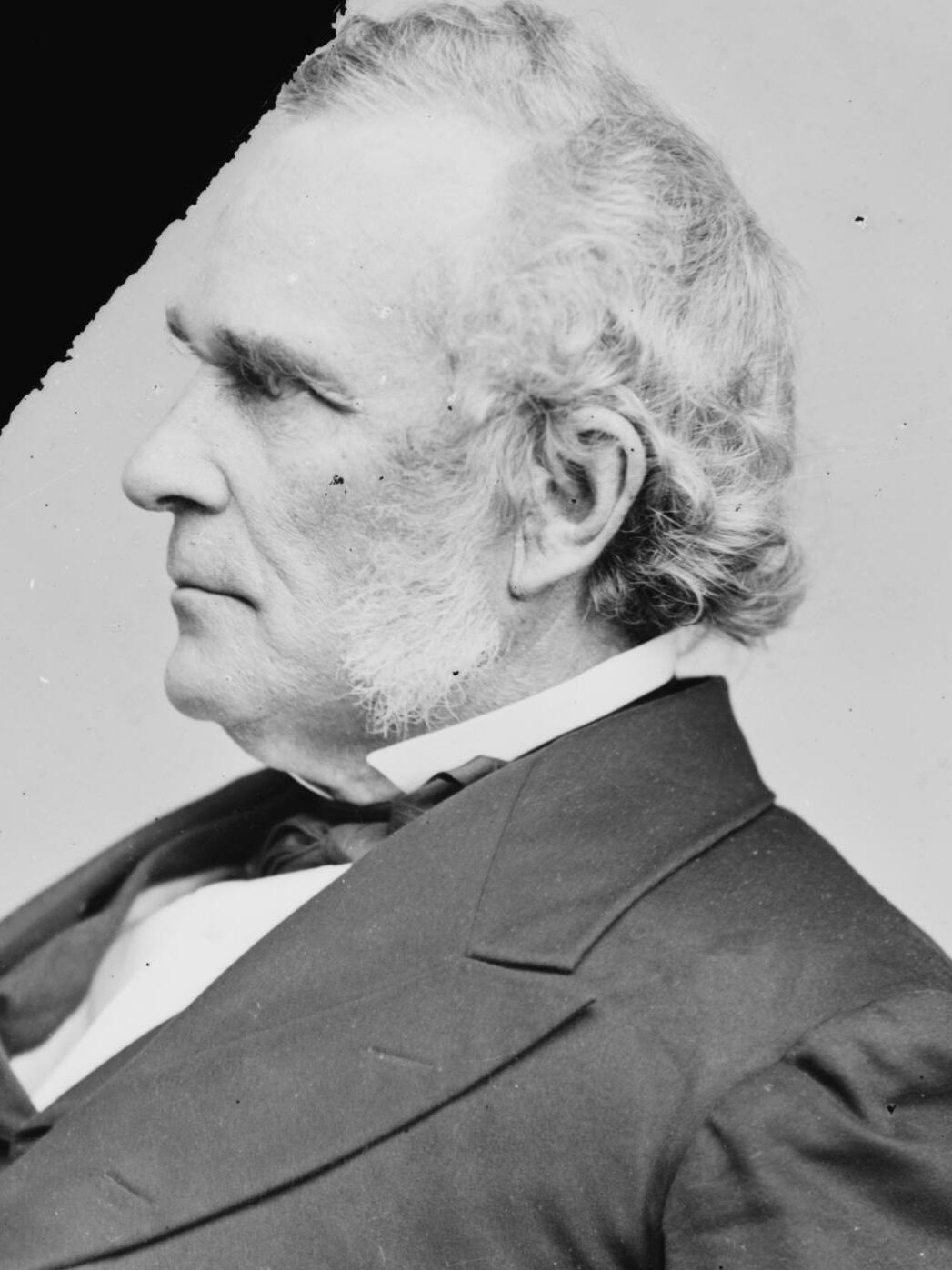

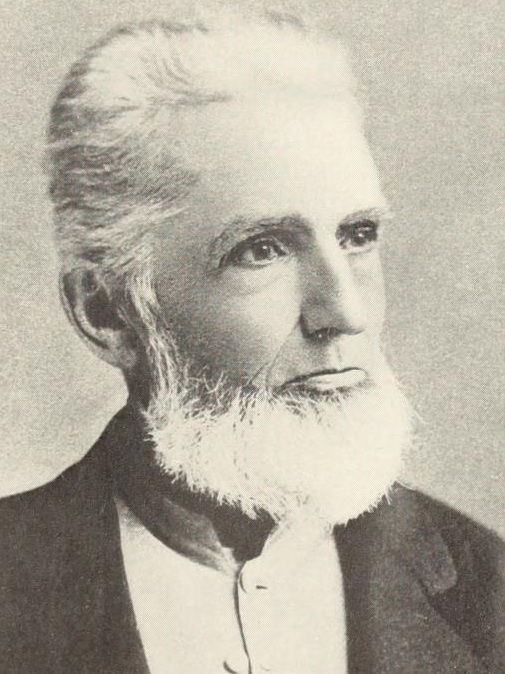
Nominee	William Alfred Buckingham	James T. Pratt
Party	Republican	Democratic
Popular vote	40,247	38,369
Percentage	51.19%	48.81%
- Buckingham: 40–50% 50–60% 60–70% 70–80% Pratt: 40–50% 50–60% 60–70% 70–80% Tie
Governor before election
William Alfred Buckingham
Republican
Elected Governor
William Alfred Buckingham
Republican

The 1859 Connecticut gubernatorial election was held on April 4, 1859. It was a rematch of the 1858 Connecticut gubernatorial election. Incumbent governor and Republican nominee William Alfred Buckingham defeated former congressman and Democratic nominee James T. Pratt with 51.19% of the vote.

== General election ==
=== Candidates ===
Major party candidates

- William Alfred Buckingham, Republican
- James T. Pratt, Democratic

=== Results ===
1859 Connecticut gubernatorial election
Party	Candidate	Votes	%	±%
Republican	William Alfred Buckingham (incumbent)	40,247	51.19%	
Democratic	James T. Pratt	38,369	48.81%	
Majority		1,878		
Turnout				
Republican hold		Swing		
