= James Loomis =

James Loomis may refer to:

- James Chaffee Loomis (1807–1877), American lawyer and politician
- James H. Loomis (1823–1914), American merchant, banker and politician
