= William A. Buckingham House =

Historic house in Connecticut

- U.S. National Register of Historic Places
- U.S. Historic district – Contributing property
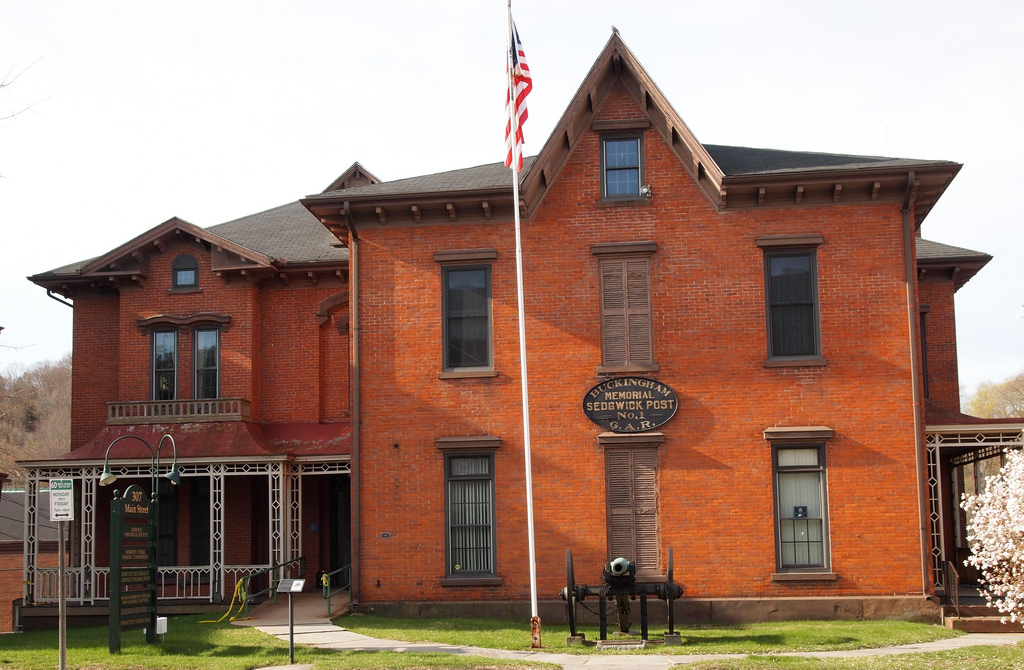

- Location within Connecticut Location within the United States
- Location: 307 Main Street, Norwich, Connecticut
- Coordinates: 41°31′27″N 72°4′28″W
- Area: 0.2 acres (0.081 ha)
- Built: 1847
- Architectural style: Italianate
- Part of: Downtown Norwich Historic District (ID85000707)
- NRHP reference No.: 82004379

Significant dates
- Added to NRHP: April 29, 1982
- Designated CP: April 4, 1985

The William A. Buckingham House, also known as Buckingham Memorial Hall, is a historic house at 307 Main Street in Norwich, Connecticut. It was built in 1847 by William A. Buckingham, whose later political career included terms as mayor of Norwich and Governor of Connecticut during the American Civil War. It has housed a variety of veterans' service organizations since 1898, as well as government offices. The house was listed on the National Register of Historic Places on April 29, 1982.

== Description and history ==
The Buckingham House is located in downtown Norwich on the south side of Main Street just east of the Otis Library. It is a 2 1/2-story brick structure, with a main block three bays wide, topped by a hipped roof with a steep gable above the original main entrance. The roof has extended eaves which are adorned with modillion blocks. A recessed wing extends to the left side, fronted by a single-story porch covered by a curving metal roof and supported by posts with open fretwork. The interior has been extensively altered, retaining only a small number of original features, including fireplaces.

The house was built in 1847 for William A. Buckingham, whose later political career included terms as mayor of Norwich and Governor of Connecticut during the American Civil War. Buckingham had both Abraham Lincoln and Ulysses S. Grant as guests. The house was purchased in 1898 by the local chapter of the Grand Army of the Republic, a Civil War veterans organization. In the early 1980s, it was the meeting place of the Sons of Union Veterans of the Civil War, a Union Civil War descendants organization. It now houses a variety of government and social service offices, as well as the Norwich Area Veterans Council, Vietnam Veterans of America Chapter 270, and the John R. Morse Chapter 10 of the Disabled American Veterans.

== See also ==
- National Register of Historic Places listings in New London County, Connecticut
