= 1861 Connecticut gubernatorial election =

- April 1, 1861
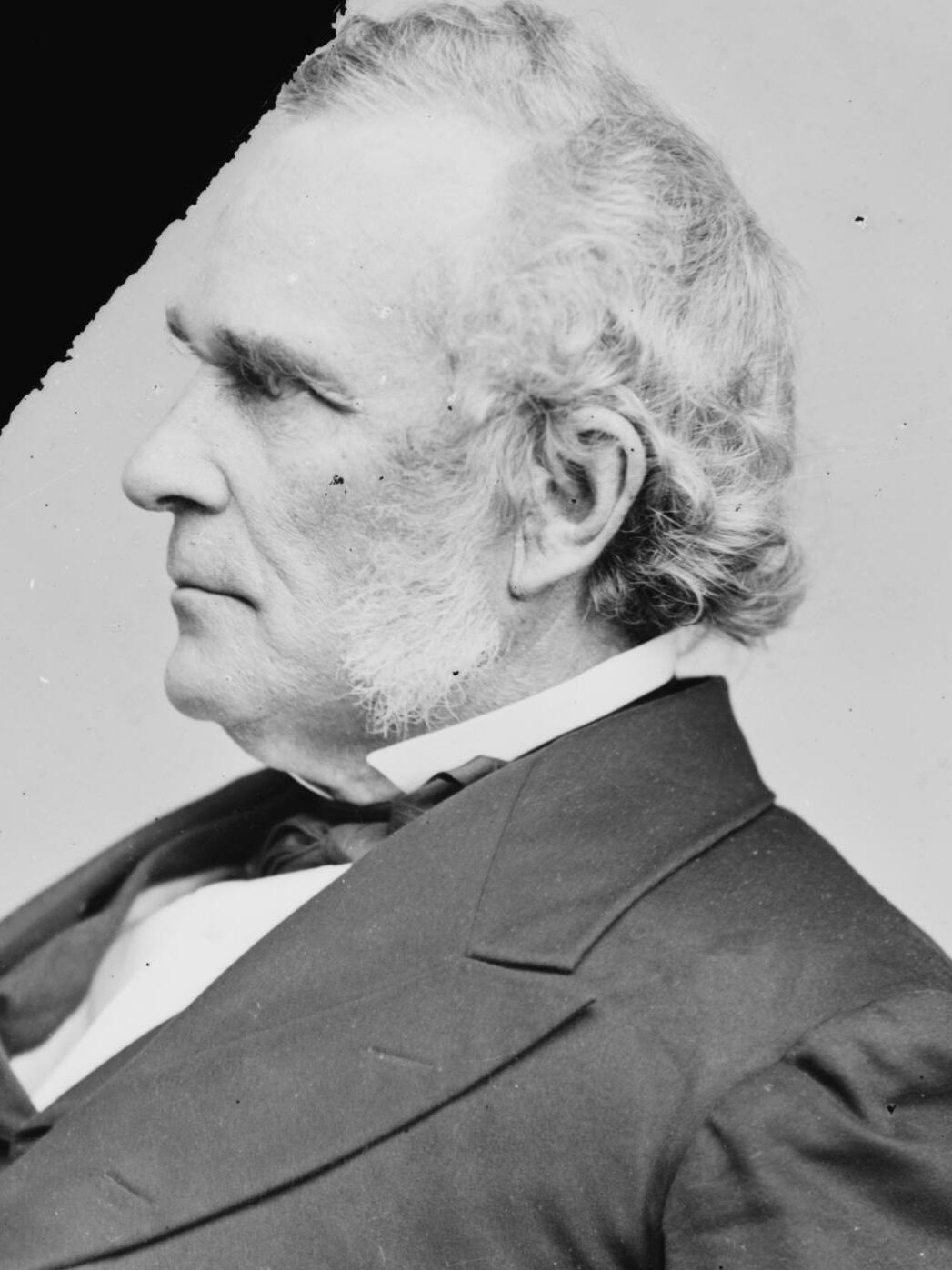

Nominee	William Alfred Buckingham	James Chaffee Loomis
Party	Republican	Democratic
Popular vote	43,012	40,926
Percentage	51.23%	48.75%
- Buckingham: 50–60% 60–70% 70–80% 80–90% Loomis: 50–60% 60–70% 70–80%
Governor before election
William Alfred Buckingham
Republican
Elected Governor
William Alfred Buckingham
Republican

The 1861 Connecticut gubernatorial election was held on April 1, 1861. Incumbent governor and Republican nominee William Alfred Buckingham defeated Democratic nominee James Chaffee Loomis with 51.23% of the vote.

== General election ==
=== Candidates ===
Major party candidates

- William Alfred Buckingham, Republican
- James Chaffee Loomis, Democratic

=== Results ===
1861 Connecticut gubernatorial election
Party	Candidate	Votes	%	±%
Republican	William Alfred Buckingham (incumbent)	43,012	51.23%	
Democratic	James Chaffee Loomis	40,926	48.75%	
Other	Others	17	0.02%	
Majority		2,086		
Turnout				
Republican hold		Swing		
