= William W. Welch =

American politician

William Wickham Welch

Member of the United States House of Representatives from Connecticut's 4th congressional district
- In office March 4, 1855 – March 3, 1857
- Preceded by: Origen S. Seymour
- Succeeded by: William D. Bishop

Member of the Connecticut Senate from the 17th district
- In office 1851–

Member of the Connecticut House of Representatives
- In office 1848–1850
- In office 1869–
- In office 1881–

Personal details
- Born: December 10, 1818 Norfolk, Connecticut
- Died: July 30, 1892 (aged 73) Norfolk, Connecticut
- Resting place: Center Cemetery
- Party: American Party
- Spouse(s): Emeline Collins(m. November 7, 1845), Emily Sedgwick (May 22, 1866)
- Education: Yale College (medicine, 1839)
- Occupation: physician

William Wickham Welch (December 10, 1818 – July 30, 1892) was an American Party member of the United States House of Representatives from Connecticut's 4th congressional district from 1855 to 1857.

== Early life ==
Welch was born in Norfolk, Connecticut, the son of Dr. Benjamin Welch and Elizabeth Loveland Welch. He was graduated from the medical department of Yale College in 1839 and commenced the practice of medicine in Norfolk.

== Political career ==
He served as member of the Connecticut House of Representatives from 1848 to 1850. He served in the Connecticut Senate in 1851 and 1852.

Welch served as a member of the Thirty-fourth Congress from March 4, 1855 to March 3, 1857. After his term, he resumed the practice of his profession.

He was again a member of the Connecticut House of Representatives in 1869 and 1881.

He died in Norfolk, Connecticut, July 30, 1892. He was interred in Center Cemetery.

Political offices
Preceded by.	Member of the Connecticut House of Representatives; 1848–1850, 1869 and 1881	Succeeded by.
Preceded by.	Member of the Connecticut Senate; 1851 – 1852	Succeeded by.
U.S. House of Representatives
Preceded by Origen S. Seymour	Member of the U.S. House of Representatives from Connecticut's 4th congressional district March 4, 1855 – March 3, 1857	Succeeded by William D. Bishop
