= Charles T. Hillyer =

American general

General Charles T. Hillyer
- Born: May 8, 1800; Granby, Connecticut
- Died: March 3, 1891 (aged 90); Hartford, Connecticut
- Spouse: Catherine
- Military career
- Allegiance: United States
- Branch: United States Army
- Rank: Brigadier General
- Commands: Connecticut State Militia
- Conflicts: American Civil War
- Website: www.ct.gov/mil

Charles Tudor Hillyer (1800–1891) was a Connecticut resident from East Granby who served as the state's Adjutant General from 1840 to 1845. Prior to serving as adjutant general, he served in state politics, being elected to the state house of representatives in 1828 and 1830 and then elected to the state senate in 1836. He was the first president of Charter Oak Bank in 1855, a position he held until 1879. While serving as a bank president, he served as a Union general during the American Civil War. Charles Hillyer also established Hillyer College, which is now part of the University of Hartford. Charles Hillyer was very active in the YMCA and founded the chapter in Hartford, Connecticut.

Military offices
Preceded by Samuel L. Pitkin	Connecticut Adjutant General; 1840 - 1845	Succeeded by James T. Pratt
