= Osbert Burr Loomis =

American painter (1813–1886)

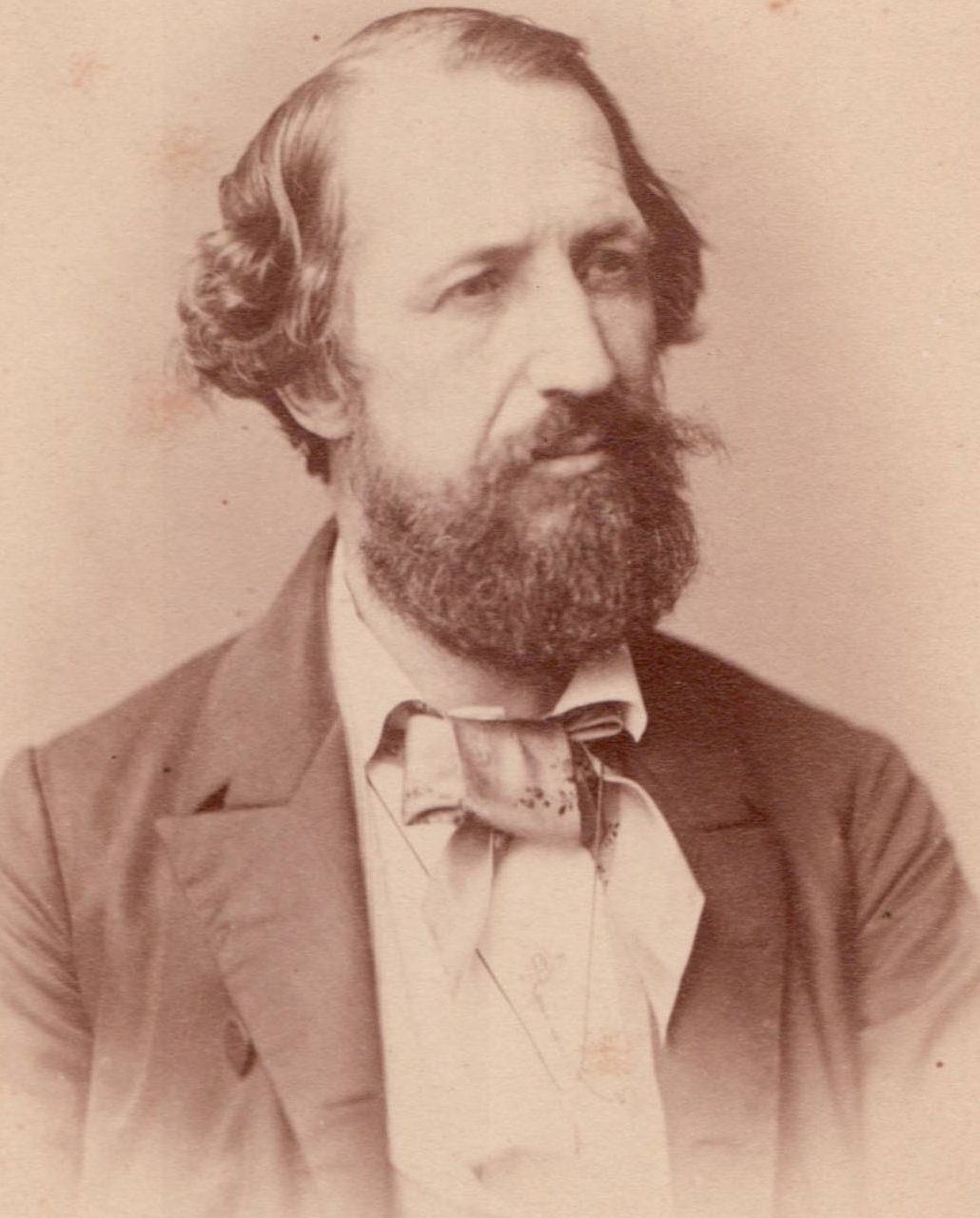
- Born: July 30, 1813; Windsor, Connecticut, U.S.
- Died: April 30, 1886 (aged 72); New York City, New York, U.S.
- Education: Yale College
- Occupation: Painter
- Spouse: Jeannette H. Jarvis (m. 1843)
- Relatives: James Chaffee Loomis (brother)

Osbert Burr Loomis (July 30, 1813 – April 30, 1886) was an American portrait painter. He is a founder of Loomis Institute.

== Early life ==
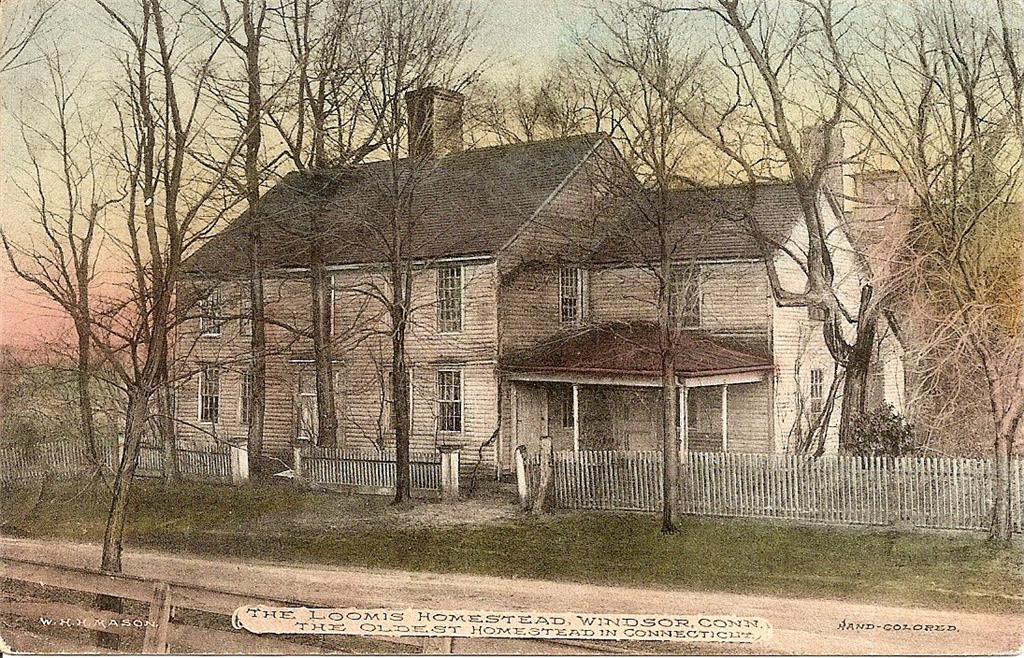
Loomis Homestead in Windsor

Osbert Burr Loomis was on July 30, 1813, in Windsor, Connecticut, as the fourth son to Abigail S. (née Chaffee) and James Loomis. His brother was James Chaffee Loomis. He graduated from Yale College in 1835. Following graduation, he studied with Samuel F. B. Morse, the president of the National Academy in New York City.

== Career ==
In the winter of 1836, Loomis began his career as a portrait painter in Charleston, South Carolina. From 1844 to 1862, he lived in Havana, Cuba and painted a number of altarpieces for churches and chapels. He then returned to New York City.

In 1874, the Connecticut legislature passed a law naming Loomis and his brothers and sister as trustees of Loomis Institute, an institute for "the free education of children and youth between 12 and 20 years of age" in Windsor. At the time of his death, he was a trustee of Somerville Water Power Company, director of the Richmond County Gaslight Company and president of Loomis Institute.

== Personal life ==
Loomis married Jeannette H. Jarvis, eldest daughter of reverend Dr. Samuel F. Jarvis of Middletown on January 19, 1843. Her father was president of Trinity College. In January 1844, he went with his wife to Havana where they continued living until May 1862.

Loomis died on April 30, 1886, at his home on East 66th Street in New York City.
