= Henry C. Deming =

American politician (1815–1872)

Henry Champion Deming
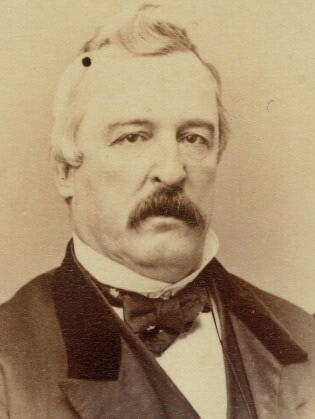
- Henry C. Deming, 1865 photograph by Mathew Brady & Co.

Member of the U.S. House of Representatives from Connecticut's 1st district
- In office March 4, 1863 – March 4, 1867
- Preceded by: Dwight Loomis
- Succeeded by: Richard D. Hubbard

Acting Military Mayor of New Orleans
- In office October 2, 1862 – January 30, 1863
- Preceded by: Godfrey Weitzel
- Succeeded by: James F. Miller

Mayor of Hartford
- In office April 9, 1860 – February 27, 1862
- Preceded by: Timothy M. Allyn
- Succeeded by: Charles S. Benton
- In office April 17, 1854 – April 12, 1858
- Preceded by: William Jas. Hamersley
- Succeeded by: Timothy M. Allyn

Member of the Connecticut State Senate
- In office 1851

Member of the Connecticut House of Representatives
- In office 1859–1861
- In office 1849–1850

Collector of Internal Revenue
- In office 1869 – October 8, 1872
- Appointed by: Ulysses S. Grant

Personal details
- Born: May 23, 1815 Colchester, Connecticut, U.S.
- Died: October 8, 1872 (aged 57) Hartford, Connecticut, U.S.
- Resting place: Spring Grove Cemetery
- Party: Republican
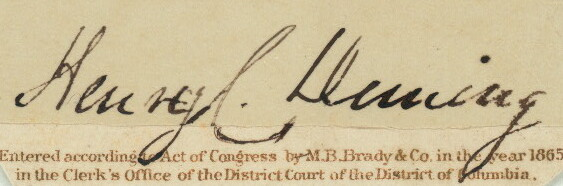
- Signature

Henry Champion Deming (May 23, 1815 – October 8, 1872) was a politician and writer who served as U.S. Representative from Connecticut, the mayor Hartford, the acting military mayor of New Orleans, and a member of the Connecticut House of Representatives, and Collector of Internal Revenue.

== Early life and education ==
Born May 23, 1815, in Colchester, Connecticut, the son of Gen. David and Abigail (Champion) Deming. Demings father was a general that had served in the Battle of Bunker Hill during the American Revolutionary War.

Deming pursued classical studies. He graduated from Yale College in 1836 where he was an 1836 initiate into the Skull and Bones Society, and from the Harvard Law School in 1839. At Yale, he established his reputation for being a talented writer and orator.

Demings would, later in life, receive an LL.D. from Trinity College in 1861.

== Early career ==
He was admitted to the bar in 1839 and began practice in New York City but devoted his time chiefly to literary work, which he took a greater interest in. At this time he was engaged with Park Benjamin, Sr. in editing The New World, a literary weekly, and at this time also he published a translation of Eugène Sue's The Wandering Jew.

Deming had begun his law career by practicing law in New York City, but moved to Hartford, Connecticut in 1847, and would continue to be a resident of Hartford for the remainder of his life. He opened a law office in Connecticut.

== Connecticut State Legislature ==
From 1849 through 1850 and again from 1859 through 1861, Deming served in the Connecticut House of Representatives. In 1851, he served in the Connecticut State Senate.

== Mayor of Hartford ==
Deming served as mayor of Hartford from 1854 through 1858, and again from 1860 until his resignation in 1862, Deming again served as mayor of Hartford.

== Civil War military service ==
In September 1861, he jointed the Union Army to fight in the American Civil War and was appointed colonel of the 12th Connecticut Infantry Regiment. He accompanied General Benjamin Butler's capture of New Orleans.

=== Acting military mayor of New Orleans ===
After the capture of New Orleans, Deming was detailed on detached duty to serve as the acting military mayor of New Orleans (which was under martial law). Her served from October 1862 until January 1863, when he resigned both military and civil position, on account of his own health and the health of his wife.

Demings' tenure in New Orleans is best remembered for his connection to General Butler's notorious "Women Order". The order declared, "hereafter when any female shall, by word, gesture or movement, insult or show contempt for any officer or soldier of the United States, she shall be regarded and held liable to be treated as a woman of the town plying her avocation," effectively giving Union troops the go-ahead to mistreat the city's women. It had been reported that one of the contributing factors in Butler's decision to issue the order was an instance where an individual (presumably a woman) emptied a can of dirty water on Deming and David Farragut when they were walking in full uniform.

Members of Deming's Mayoral Administration
Name	Position(s)
John A. Watkins	Head of the Board of Accessors
E. H. Durell	Head of the Bureau of Finance
Julien Neville	Head of the Bureau of Streets and Landings
Stoddard Howell	Comptroller
Sam H. Torsey	Head of the Bureau of Streets and Landings
G. Ingram	President of the Drainage Board/Member from the 1st district
Edmund Murphy	Inspector of Weights and Measures
W. T. Terrebone	Inspector of Weights and Measures
Lieutenant Colonel J. B. Kinsman	Police Department aide de camp
W. H. Crane	Head of the Special Police Department
A. W. Morse	Secretary
W. S. Pettingill	Secretary
Thos. Henry Murphy	Secretary
W. H. Bell	Street Commissioner
Colonel T. B. Thorpe	Surveyor
John S. Walton	Treasurer
Benjamin Flanders	Treasurer

== United States House of Representatives ==
After resigning from the army and returning to Hartford, Deming was elected as a Republican to the United States House of Representatives. He served in the Thirty-eighth and Thirty-ninth Congresses (March 4, 1863 – March 4, 1867). He served as chairman of the House Committee on Expenditures in the Department of War in the Thirty-eighth and Thirty-ninth Congresses. He also served on the House Committee on War Expenditures. He was an unsuccessful candidate for reelection in 1866 to the Fortieth Congress.

== Collector of Internal Revenue ==
In 1869, he was appointed by the President Ulysses S. Grant to serve as collector of Internal Revenue, and this office he held until his death.

== Writings and literature ==
Demings spent a large amount of time working professionally in literature and journalism. In addition to editing the New World weekly literary weekly while in New York. He published a number of his speeches, including congressional speeches, a Eulogy of Abraham Lincoln that he had delivered before the General Assembly of Connecticut in 1865, and an Oration delivered at the completion of the Monument to Gen. David Wooster, at Danbury, Connecticut in 1854. He also had unpublished writings. He also wrote the "Life of U. S. Grant", published in 1868, and written about his good friend Ulysses S. Grant, who he had great admiration for. The work had extensive sale and is considered to have been influential. His Yale obituary wrote that his writings, "abundantly attest his great fertility of intellect; his personal power as an orator was equally remarkable."

== Family ==
In 1850 he married Sarah, daughter of Laurent Clerc, the first deaf-mute instructor in the United States. Together they had three sons and a daughter. His wife died in July 1869. In 1871, he married Mrs. Annie Putnam Jillson, a great-granddaughter of General Israel Putnam. Jillson survived him when he died.

=== Children ===
Children of Deming and his first wife:

- Henry Champion Deming, Jr. (November 25, 1850 – January 19, 1931), president Mercantile Trust Company
- Mary Shipman Deming (May 2, 1855 - November 11, 1859)
- Laurent Clerc Deming (November 21, 1860 – October 12, 1945), railroad executive
- 3 infants, not named, died in infancy (1854, 1857, 1859)

== Death ==
Demings died in Hartford on October 9, 1872. His death occurred at his residence. He was interred in Spring Grove Cemetery.

U.S. House of Representatives
Preceded by Dwight Loomis	Member of the U.S. House of Representatives from Connecticut's 1st congressional district 1863–1867	Succeeded by Richard D. Hubbard
