= Ezra Clark Jr. =

American politician (1813–1896)

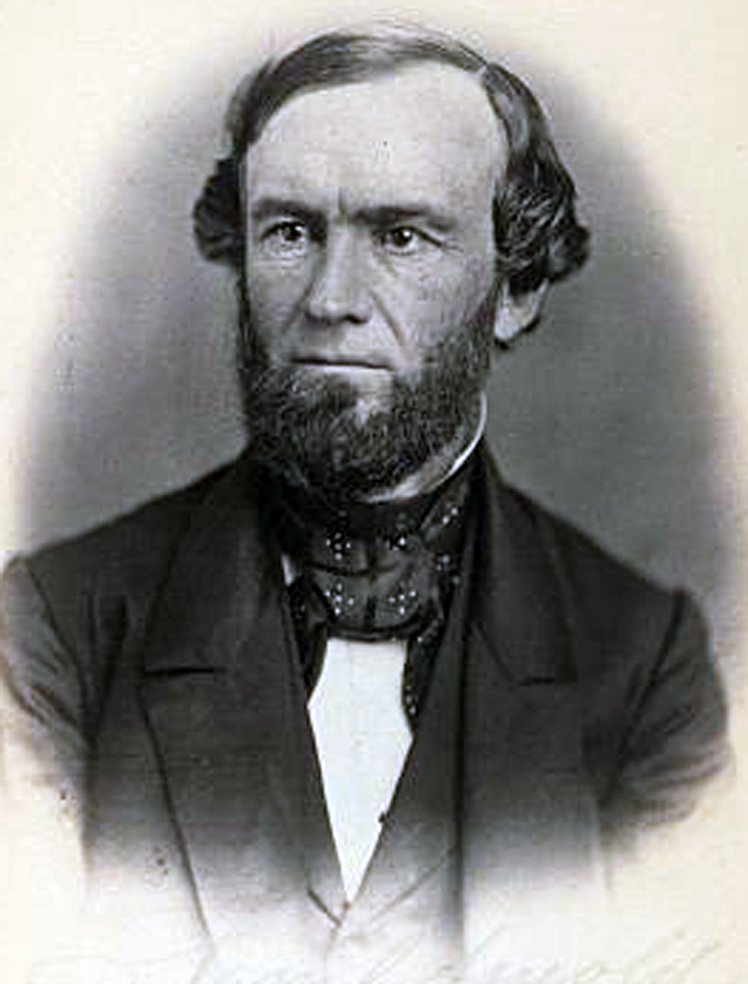

Member of the U.S. House of Representatives from Connecticut's 1st district
- In office March 4, 1855 – March 3, 1859
- Preceded by: James T. Pratt
- Succeeded by: Dwight Loomis

Personal details
- Born: September 12, 1813 Brattleboro, Vermont, U.S.
- Died: September 26, 1896 (aged 83) Hartford, Connecticut, U.S
- Party: Republican
- Other political affiliations: American Party (before 1857)

Ezra Clark Jr. (September 12, 1813 – September 26, 1896) was a U.S. representative from Connecticut.

Born in Brattleboro, Vermont, Clark moved with his parents to Hartford, Connecticut, in 1819. He attended the public schools. He engaged in business as an iron merchant. He served as member of the common council and the board of aldermen. He served as president of the National Screw Co. of Hartford, later consolidated with the American Screw Co. of Providence, Rhode Island. He served as judge of the municipal court.

Clark was elected as the candidate of the American Party to the Thirty-fourth Congress and as a Republican to the Thirty-fifth Congress (March 4, 1855 – March 3, 1859). He served as chairman of the Committee on Manufactures (Thirty-fourth Congress). He was an unsuccessful candidate for reelection to the Thirty-sixth Congress. He served as president of the Hartford Board of Water Commissioners 1882–1895. He served as president of the Young Men's Institute of Hartford for many years. He died in Hartford, Connecticut, September 26, 1896. He was interred in Spring Grove Cemetery.

U.S. House of Representatives
Preceded by James T. Pratt	Member of the U.S. House of Representatives from Connecticut's 1st congressional district 1855–1859	Succeeded by Dwight Loomis
