= William D. Bishop =

American politician (1827–1904)

William Darius Bishop
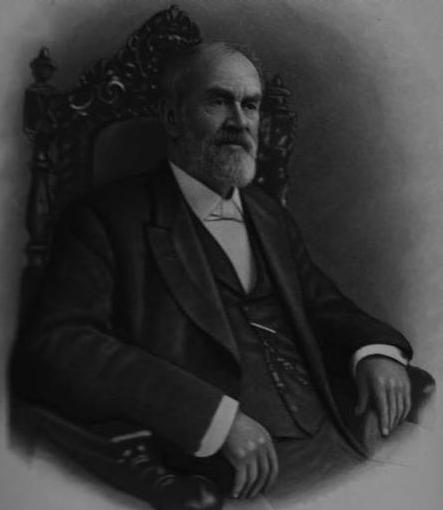

Member of the U.S. House of Representatives from Connecticut's 4th district
- In office March 4, 1857 – March 3, 1859
- Preceded by: William W. Welch
- Succeeded by: Orris S. Ferry

Member of the Connecticut House of Representatives
- In office 1866; 1871

Member of the Connecticut Senate
- In office 1877-1878

Personal details
- Born: September 14, 1827 Bloomfield, New Jersey
- Died: February 4, 1904 (aged 76) Bridgeport, Connecticut
- Party: Democratic
- Spouse: Julia Ann Tomlinson Bishop
- Children: Mary Ferris Bishop, Dr. Russell T. Bishop, Gen. Henry Alfred Bishop, William D. Bishop, Jr., Nathaniel Wheeler Bishop
- Education: Yale College
- Occupation: railroad president, politician

William Darius Bishop (September 14, 1827 – February 4, 1904) was a Democratic member of the United States House of Representatives from Connecticut's 4th district from 1857 to 1859. He also was a member of the Connecticut House of Representatives in 1872, and in the Connecticut Senate from 1866 to 1874, and from 1877 to 1878. He was the president of the Naugatuck Railroad Company and the New York and New Haven Railroad Company

== Biography ==
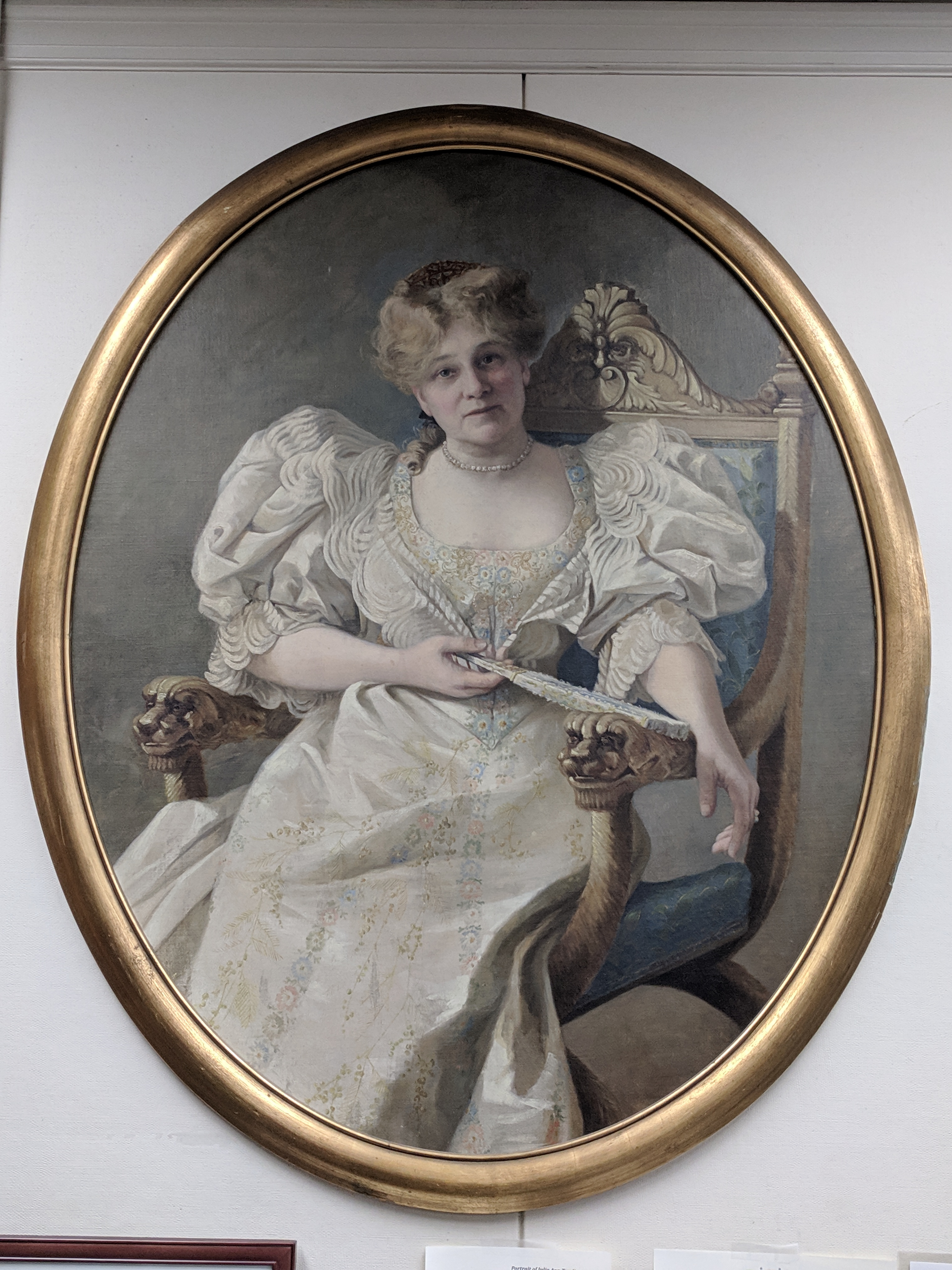
Bishop's wife's portrait hanging in the Bridgeport Public Library

Bishop was born in Bloomfield, New Jersey son of Alfred Bishop and Mary (Ferris) Bishop, and pursued preparatory studies. Graduating from Yale College in 1849, he studied law, and was admitted to the bar but did not practice. He married Julia A. Tomlinson in 1850, and they had six children.

== Career ==
Bishop carried on his father's railroad enterprises which involved the construction of the Naugatuck and the New York and New Haven Railroads in Connecticut and the railroad between Saratoga Springs and Whitehall in New York. He was a founder of the Eastern Railroad Association and its president until the time of his death.

Bishop was elected as a Democrat to the Thirty-fifth Congress for the 4th District and served from March 4, 1857, to March 3, 1859. He was chairman of the Committee on Manufactures (Thirty-fifth Congress). He was an unsuccessful candidate for reelection in 1858 to the Thirty-sixth Congress, but served as Commissioner of Patents from May 23, 1859, to January 1860. He was a delegate to Democratic National Convention from Connecticut in 1860.

As well as being vice president and president of the New York, New Haven & Hartford Railroad Company, Bishop served as a member of the Connecticut House of Representatives in 1866 and 1871. He was also in the Connecticut Senate in 1877 and 1878.

== Death ==
Bishop died of chronic endocarditis, a heart disease, in Bridgeport, Connecticut, on February 4, 1904 (age 76 years, 143 days). He was cremated and his ashes are interred at Mountain Grove Cemetery.

Political offices
Preceded by.	Member of the Connecticut House of Representatives; 1866 and 1871	Succeeded by.
Preceded by.	Member of the Connecticut Senate; 1877 and 1878.	Succeeded by.
U.S. House of Representatives
Preceded by William W. Welch	Member of the U.S. House of Representatives from Connecticut's 4th congressional district March 4, 1857 – March 3, 1859	Succeeded by Orris S. Ferry
