= 1862 Connecticut gubernatorial election =

- April 7, 1862
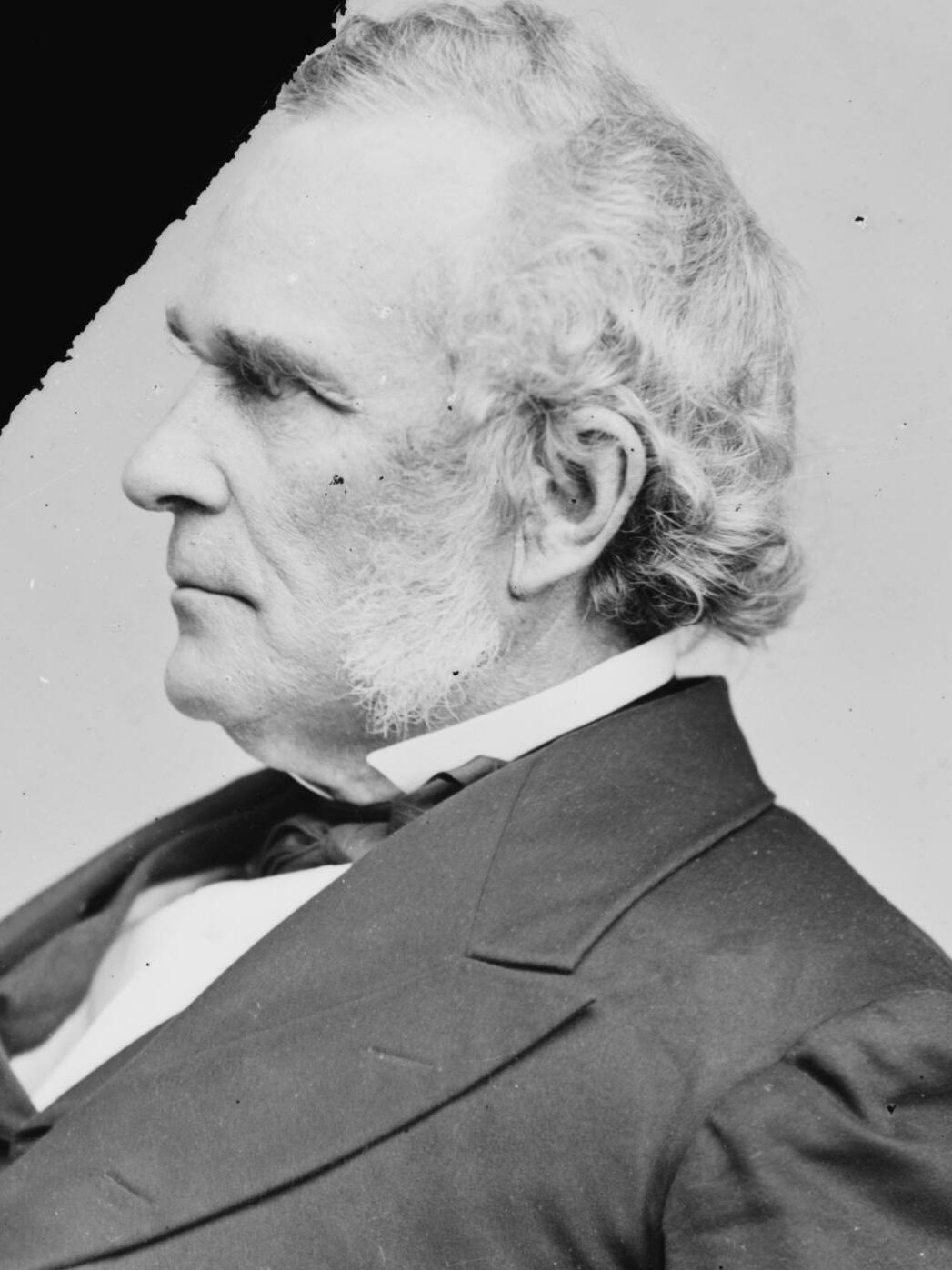

Nominee	William Alfred Buckingham	James Chaffee Loomis
Party	Republican	Democratic
Alliance	Republican–Union
Popular vote	39,782	30,634
Percentage	56.50%	43.50%
- Buckingham: 50–60% 60–70% 70–80% 80–90% Loomis: 50–60% 60–70% 70–80%
Governor before election
William Alfred Buckingham
Republican
Elected Governor
William Alfred Buckingham
Republican

The 1862 Connecticut gubernatorial election took place on April 7, 1862. Incumbent governor of Connecticut and Republican–Union nominee William Alfred Buckingham defeated Democratic nominee James Chaffee Loomis.

The inaugural Union state convention met in Hartford, Connecticut, on January 8, 1862. War Democrats numbered prominently among the participants, while radical Republicans were conspicuously underrepresented. The delegates nominated Buckingham along with most of the Republican incumbent state officials, but chose War Democrats for lieutenant governor and state treasurer. The platform adopted by the convention included resolutions supporting the Union and the suspension of partisan politics while avoiding taking a position on slavery and emancipation.

The Republican state convention met on January 16 and endorsed the Union state ticket. Copperheads dominated the regular Democratic convention; the delegates nominated Breckinridge Democrat Loomis for governor and Douglas Democrat John T. Wait for lieutenant governor. Running on both the Republican and Union tickets, Buckingham defeated Loomis by more than 9,000 votes; the significant increase compared to the Republican vote in the last election indicated the significant number of War Democrats who supported the Republican–Union coalition.

== General election ==
=== Candidates ===
- William Alfred Buckingham, Republican–Union
- James Chaffee Loomis, Democratic

=== Results ===
1862 Connecticut gubernatorial election
Party	Candidate	Votes	%
Republican–Union	William Alfred Buckingham (incumbent)	39,782	56.50%
Democratic	James Chaffee Loomis	30,634	43.50%
Majority		9,148	
Turnout			
Republican hold			

== Bibliography ==
- Dell, Christopher (1975). Lincoln and the War Democrats: The Grand Erosion of Conservative Tradition. Rutherford, NJ: Farleigh Dickenson University Press. ISBN 978-0-8386-1466-2.
- Dubin, Michael J. (2014). United States Gubernatorial Elections, 1861-1911: The Official Results by State and County. Jefferson, NC: McFarland and Company.
- Smith, Adam I. P. (2006). No Party Now: Politics in the Civil War North. New York: Oxford University Press. ISBN 978-0-19-518865-3.
