= Origen S. Seymour =

American judge (1804–1881)

Origen Storrs Seymour
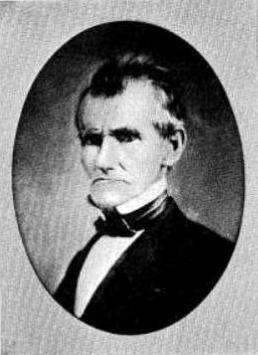

Chief Justice of the Connecticut Supreme Court
- In office 1873–1874

Speaker of the Connecticut House of Representatives 1850

Member of the United States House of Representatives from Connecticut's 4th district
- In office March 4, 1851 – March 3, 1855
- Preceded by: Thomas B. Butler
- Succeeded by: William W. Welch

Member of the Connecticut House of Representatives
- In office 1842–1842
- In office 1849–1850
- In office 1880–1880

Personal details
- Born: February 9, 1804 Litchfield, Connecticut
- Died: August 12, 1881 (aged 77) Litchfield, Connecticut
- Party: Democratic
- Spouse: Lucy Morris Woodruff
- Children: Edward Woodruff Seymour and Morris Woodruff Seymour
- Education: Yale College

Origen Storrs Seymour (February 9, 1804 – August 12, 1881) was a Democratic speaker of the Connecticut House of Representatives in 1850 and the chief justice of the Connecticut Supreme Court from 1873 to 1874. He was an unsuccessful candidate for governor in 1864 and 1865. He served as U.S. Representative from Connecticut from the 4th congressional district. He served as chairman of the commission to settle the boundary dispute between Connecticut and New York in 1876. Seymour was the first president of the Connecticut Bar Association.

== Early life and family ==
Seymour was the son of Ozias Seymour (1776–1851) and Selima Storrs Seymour. He was born and attended the public schools in Litchfield, Connecticut. He was graduated from Yale College in 1824 in law. He was admitted to the bar in 1826 and commenced practice in Litchfield, Connecticut. He was father of Edward Woodruff Seymour and nephew of Horatio Seymour.

== Political career ==
He served as county clerk 1836–1844. He served as member of the Connecticut House of Representatives in 1842, 1849–1850, and served as Speaker of the Connecticut House in 1850. He was again a member of the State house of representatives in 1880.

Seymour was elected to the Thirty-second and Thirty-third Congresses (March 4, 1851 – March 3, 1855).

He served as judge of the superior court of Connecticut 1855–1863.

He was an unsuccessful Democratic candidate for governor in 1864 and 1865.

He served as judge of the State supreme court in 1870, chief justice in 1873, and served until retired by age limitation in 1874.

He died in Litchfield, Connecticut, August 12, 1881. He was interred in East Cemetery.

== See also ==
- Seymour-Conkling family

Party political offices
Preceded by Thomas H. Seymour	Democratic nominee for Governor of Connecticut; 1864, 1865	Succeeded by James E. English
Preceded by.	Member of the Connecticut House of Representatives; 1842, 1849 – 1850 and 1880	Succeeded by.
U.S. House of Representatives
Preceded by Thomas B. Butler	Member of the U.S. House of Representatives from Connecticut's 4th congressional district March 4, 1851– March 3, 1855	Succeeded by William W. Welch
