= James T. Pratt =

American politician

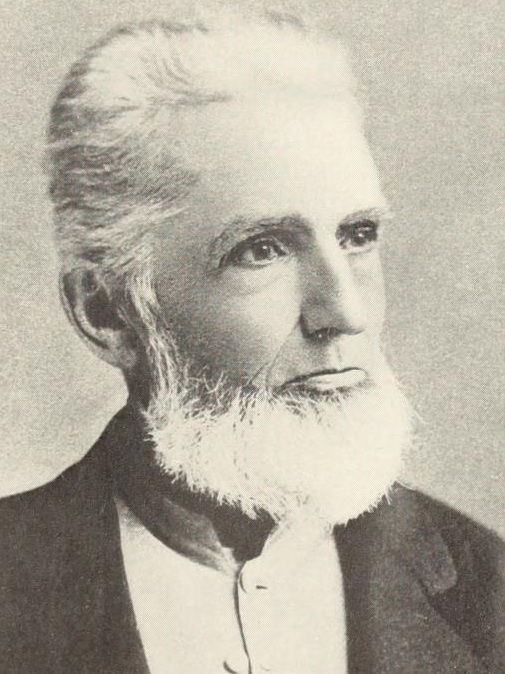

Member of the U.S. House of Representatives from Connecticut's 1st district
- In office March 4, 1853 – March 3, 1855
- Preceded by: Charles Chapman
- Succeeded by: Ezra Clark Jr.

President pro tempore of the Connecticut Senate
- In office 1852
- Preceded by: Henry E. Peck
- Succeeded by: Daniel B. Warner

Member of the Connecticut Senate
- In office 1852

Member of the Connecticut House of Representatives
- In office 1870–1871; 1862; 1857; 1850; 1847–1848

Connecticut Adjutant General
- In office 1846–1847
- Preceded by: Charles T. Hillyer
- Succeeded by: George P. Shelton

Personal details
- Born: December 14, 1802 Cromwell, Connecticut
- Died: April 11, 1887 (aged 84) Wethersfield, Connecticut
- Resting place: Indian Hill Cemetery, Middletown, Connecticut

James Timothy Pratt (December 14, 1802 – April 11, 1887) was a U.S. representative from Connecticut.

Born in Cromwell, Connecticut, Pratt attended the common schools. He engaged in mercantile and agricultural pursuits in Hartford, Connecticut.

Enlisted in the "Horse Guard" in 1820. He served as mayor 1826–29. Pratt was elected major of the First Regiment of Cavalry in 1834. He served as colonel in 1836, brigadier general 1837–39 and a major general 1839–46.

Pratt then served as adjutant general in 1846, retiring from mercantile pursuits and settled in Rocky Hill, Connecticut.

He served as member of the Connecticut House of Representatives in 1847, 1848, and 1850. The a member of the Connecticut Senate in 1852. He served as President pro tempore of the Connecticut Senate.

He was again a member of the State house of representatives in 1857 and 1862.

Pratt was elected as a Democrat to the Thirty-third Congress (March 4, 1853 – March 3, 1855).

He was an unsuccessful candidate for reelection in 1854 to the Thirty-fourth Congress. Pratt was an unsuccessful candidate for election as governor in 1858 and 1859.

Pratt served as member of the peace convention of 1861 held in Washington, D.C., in an effort to devise means to prevent the impending war.

During the American Civil War, Pratt was a War Democrat.

Pratt was again a member of the State house of representatives in 1870 and 1871.

He engaged in agricultural pursuits.

Pratt died in Wethersfield, Connecticut, April 11, 1887, and was interred in Indian Hill Cemetery, Middletown, Connecticut.

Party political offices
| Preceded by Samuel Ingham | Democratic nominee for Governor of Connecticut; 1858, 1859 | Succeeded by Thomas H. Seymour |
Military offices
| Preceded by Charles T. Hillyer | Connecticut Adjutant General; 1846–1947 | Succeeded by George P. Shelton |
U.S. House of Representatives
| Preceded by Charles Chapman | Member of the U.S. House of Representatives from Connecticut's 1st congressional district March 4, 1853 – March 3, 1855 | Succeeded by Ezra Clark Jr. |
