= Morris Woodruff Seymour =

American politician

Morris Woodruff Seymour (October 6, 1843 – October 27, 1920) was an American historian, judge, and attorney. He was born in Litchfield, Connecticut. He was a member of the Acorn Club, to which he was elected in 1920. Seymour attended Hopkins Grammar School in New Haven, Connecticut. He was a graduate of Yale College in the class of 1866 and then attended Columbia Law School. He served in the Connecticut State Senate from 1881-1882. He was a son of Origen S. Seymour and brother of Edward Woodruff Seymour.
