= Loomis Homestead =

Historic house in Connecticut

Coordinates: 41.8447°N 72.6393°W

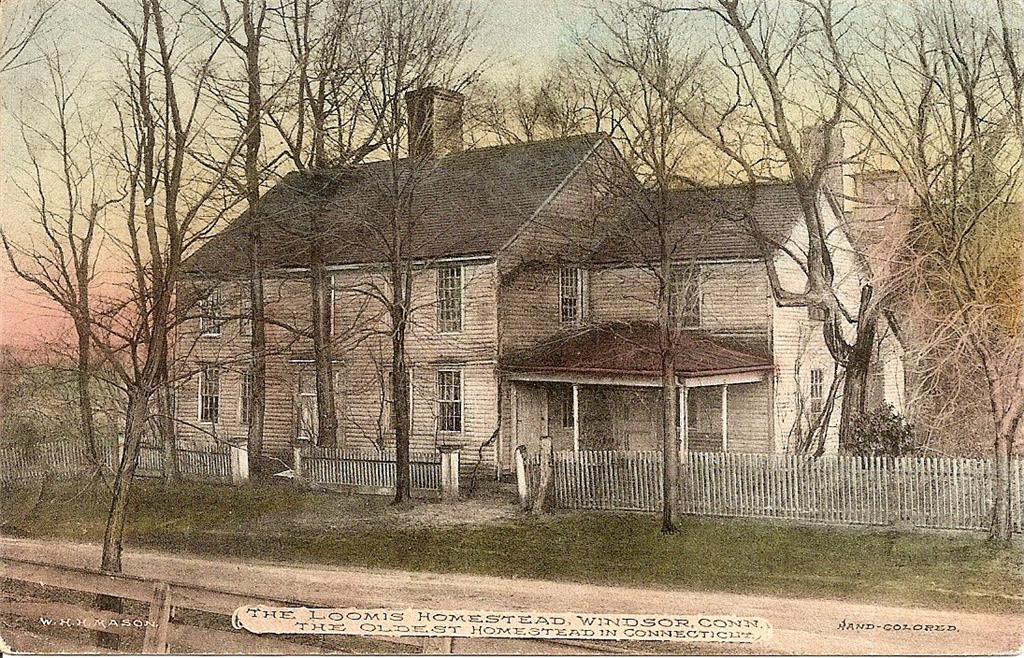
- Interactive map of the Loomis Homestead area

General information
- Type: post-and-beam
- Architectural style: Saltbox
- Location: Windsor, Connecticut
- Construction started: 1640
- Governing body: Private

The Loomis Homestead in Windsor, Connecticut is one of the oldest timber-frame houses in America. The oldest part of the house is an ell adjacent to the main house, believed to have been built between 1640 and 1653 by Joseph Loomis who came to America from England in 1638. Later additions to the Loomis house were made around the turn of the eighteenth century. The preserved house is now adjacent to the well-known Loomis Chaffee School, which was founded by Loomis' descendants who donated the surrounding farm land of the original homestead for the grounds of the school.

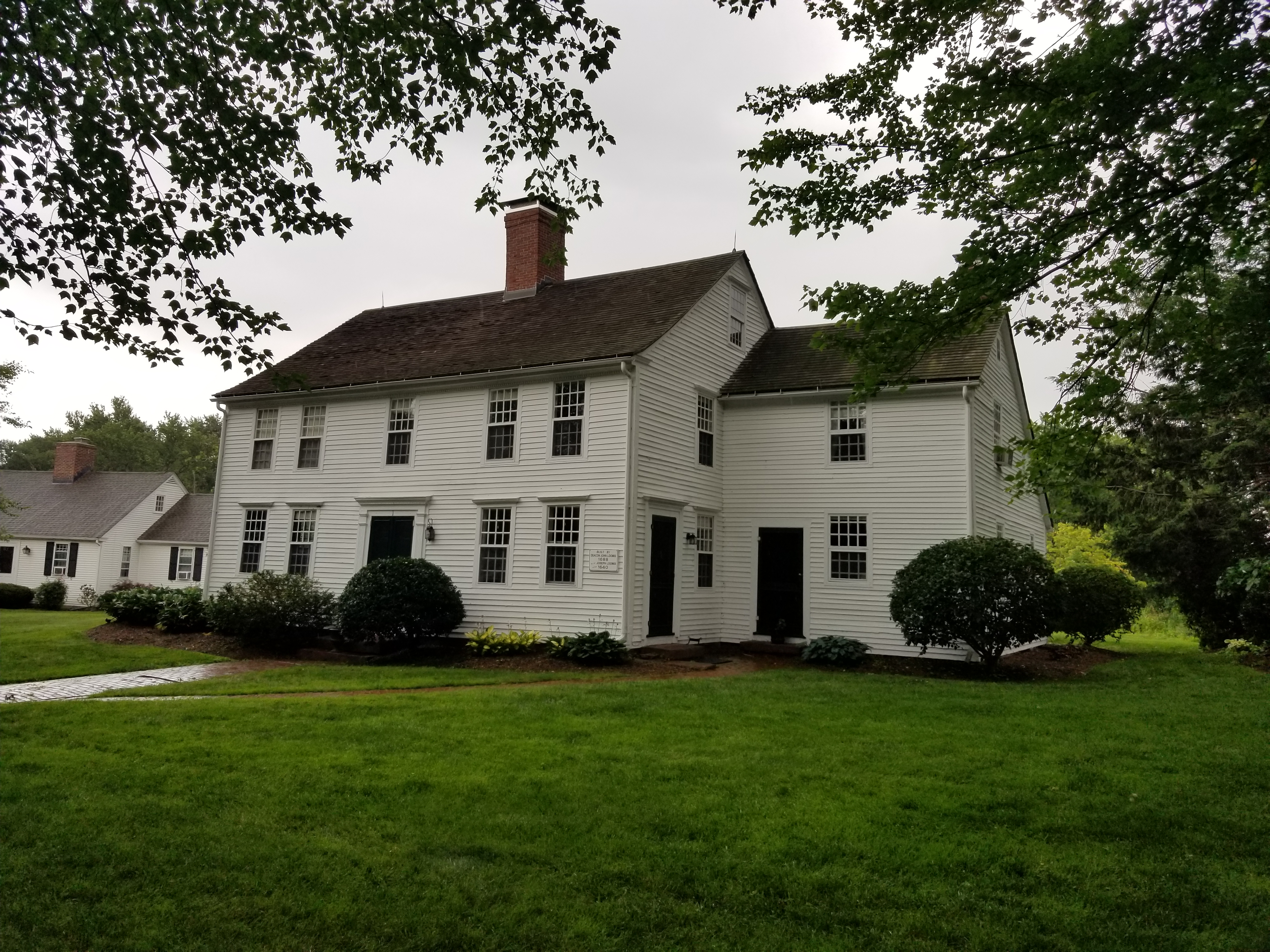
front view of house

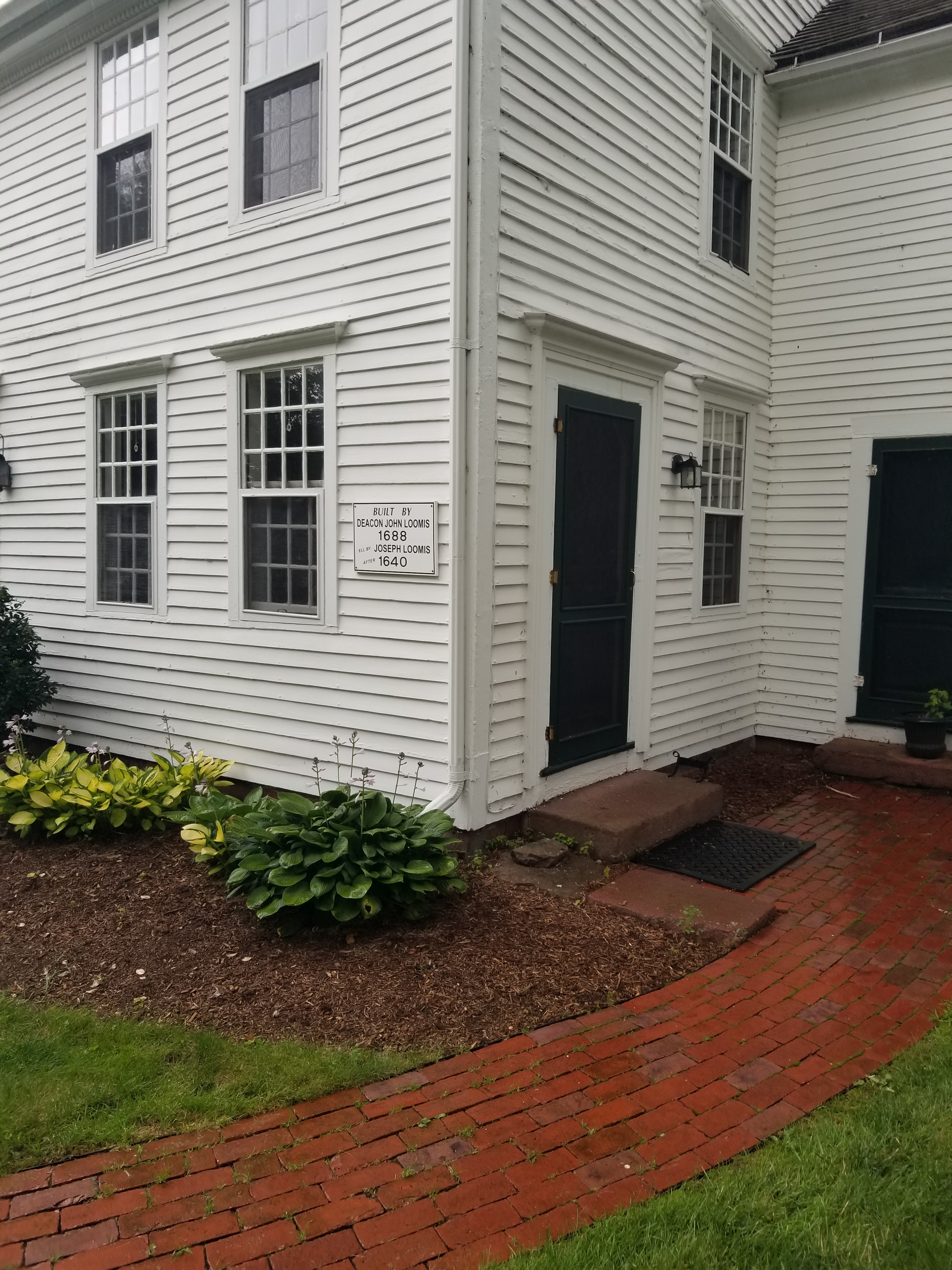
Plaque stating main house built in 1688, Ell built between 1640 and 1688

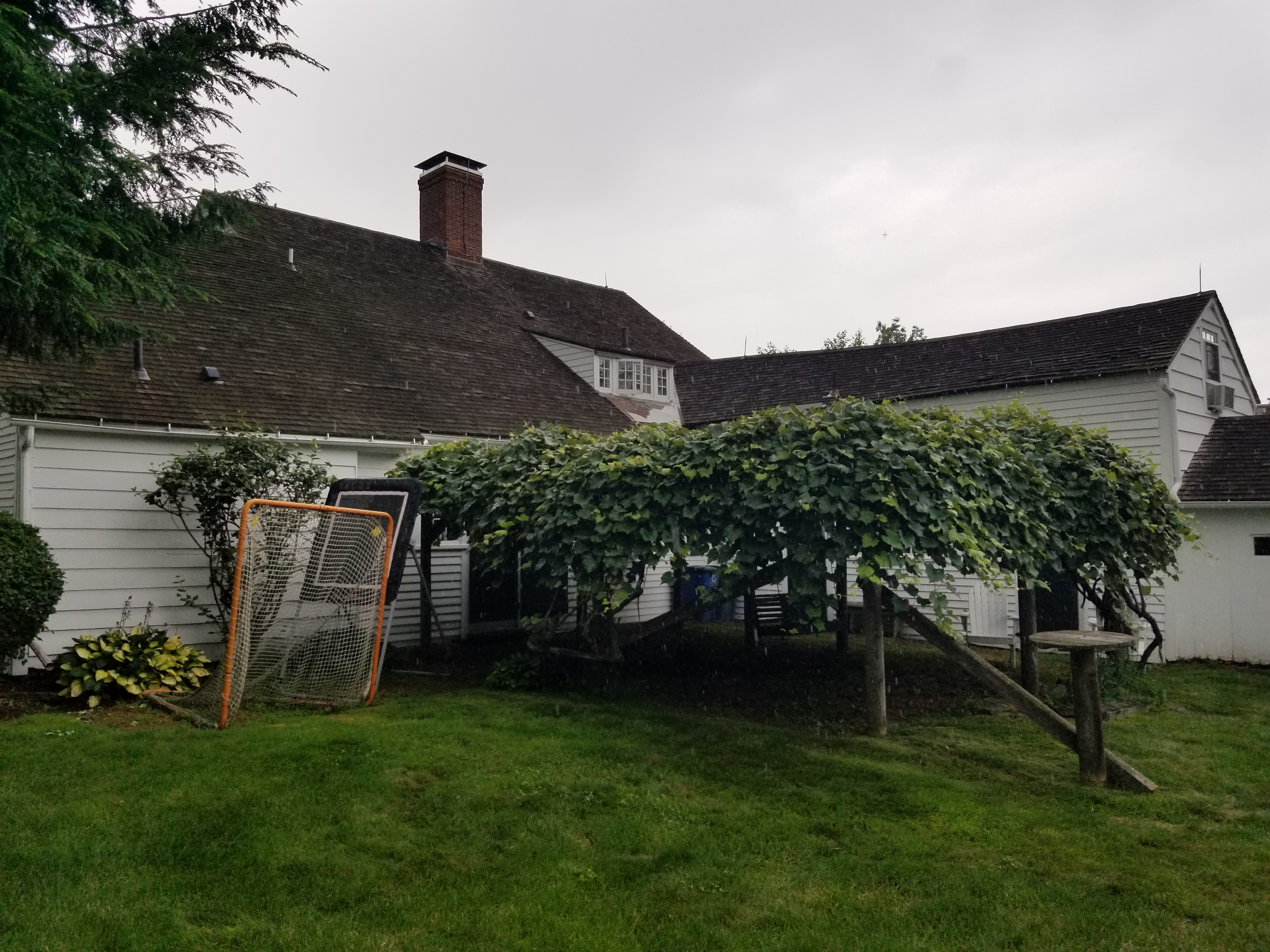
rear of house with ells

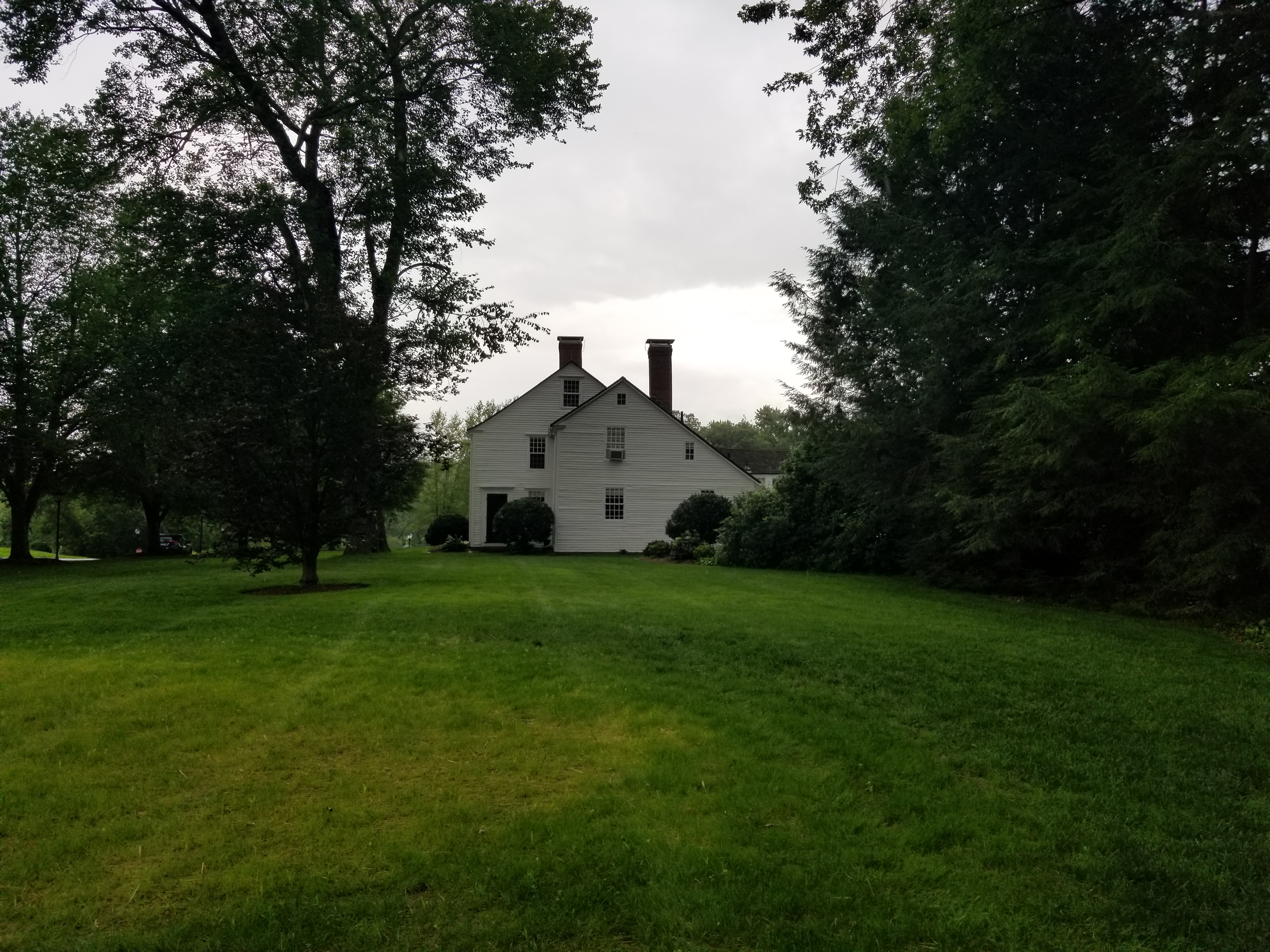
view of house from Loomis Chaffee campus

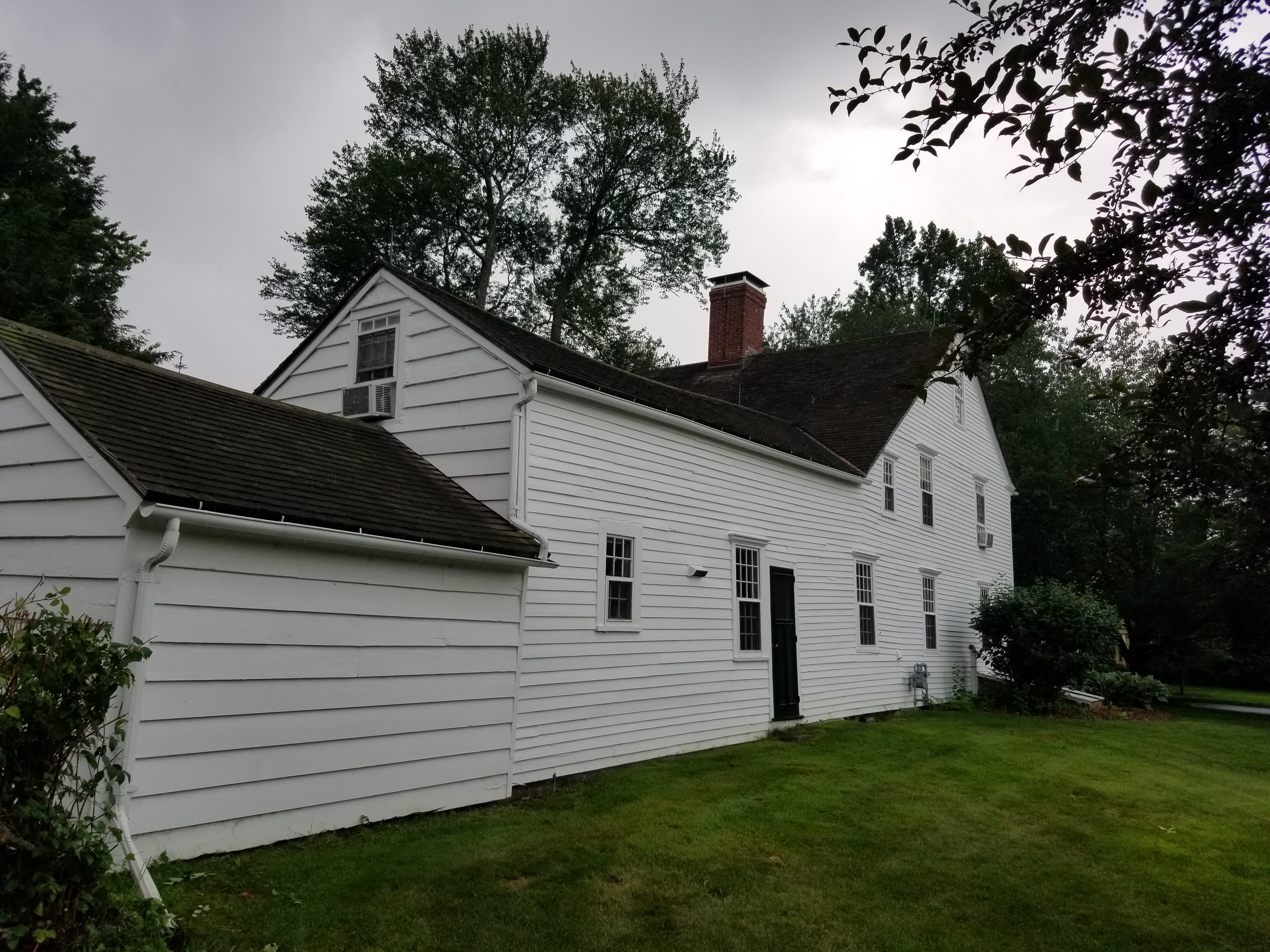
Ells on the rear of house

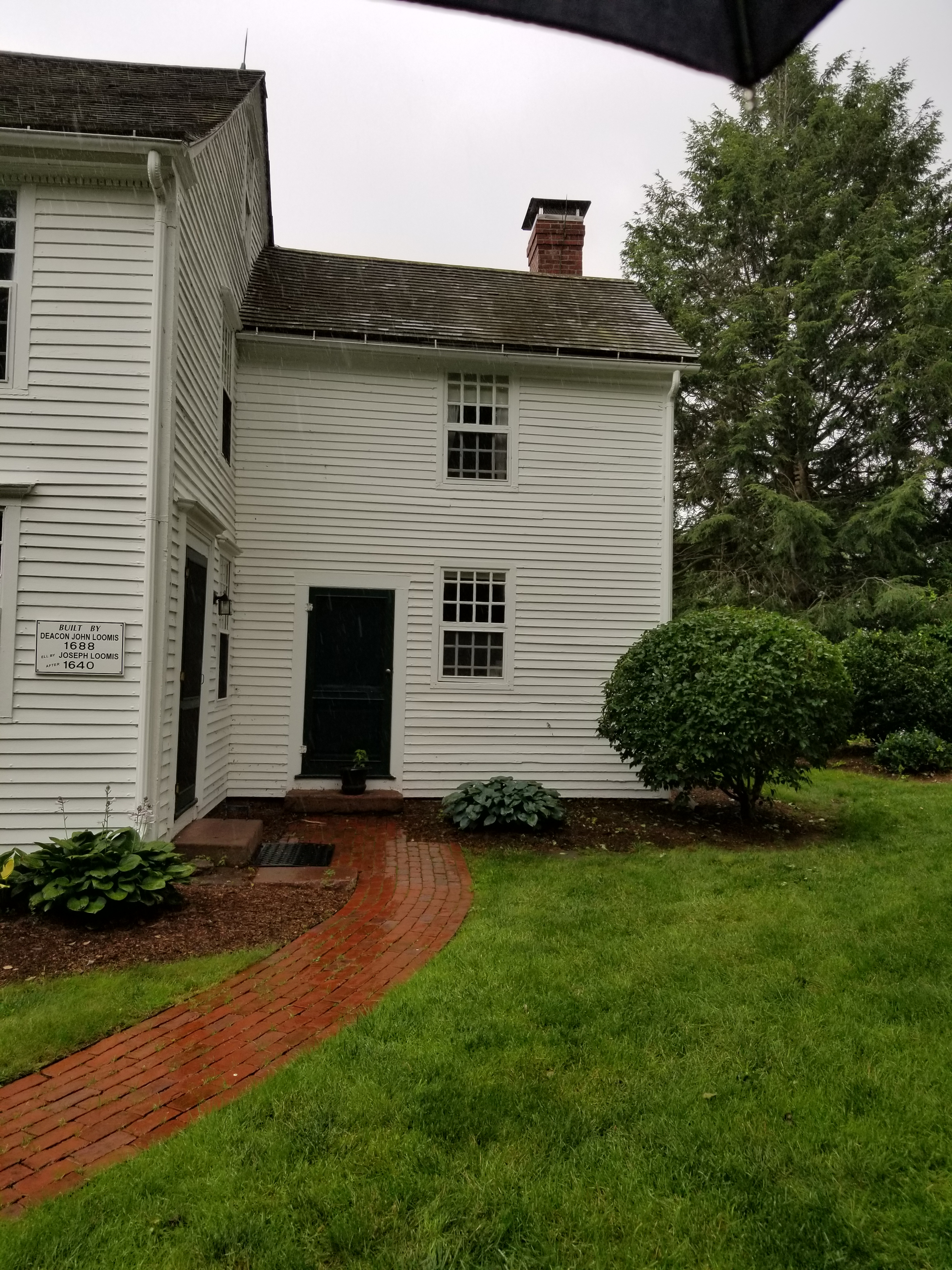
One of the ells adjacent to the right of the house
