= Loomis Chaffee School =

Prep school in Windsor, Connecticut, US

The Loomis Chaffee School
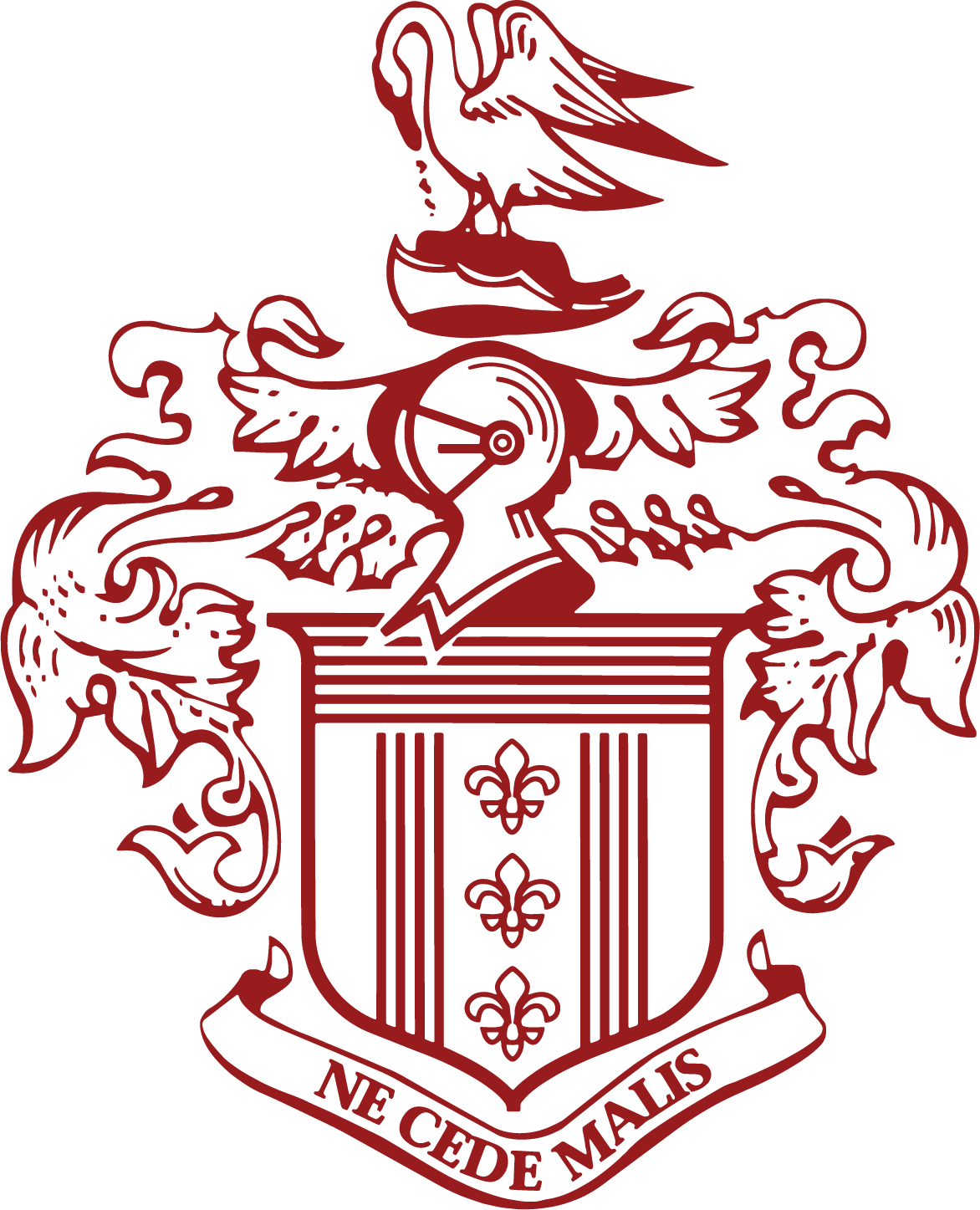

Location
- 4 Batchelder Road; Windsor, Connecticut 06095; United States; 41°50′24″N 72°38′26″W

Information
- Type: Private, independent, boarding, day
- Motto: Ne Cede Malis (Yield Not to Adversity)
- Established: 1914 (112 years ago)
- CEEB code: 070945
- Head of school: Jody Reilly Soja
- Faculty: 190
- Grades: 9–12, PG
- Gender: Coeducational
- Enrollment: 742 total; 520 boarding; 222 day (2024–2025)
- Average class size: 12 students
- Student to teacher ratio: 5:1 (4:1 boarding student-to-residential faculty)
- Campus size: 300 acres (120 ha)
- Campus type: Suburban
- Colors: Maroon and gray
- Athletics: 55 interscholastic teams in 18 sports; 19 intramural offerings
- Athletics conference: NEPSAC; Founders League
- Mascot: Pelican
- Rival: Kent School
- Accreditation: NAIS; TABS; NEASC
- Newspaper: The Loomis Chaffee Log
- Endowment: $350 million
- Budget: $55.7 million (2019)
- Tuition: $61,760 (boarding) $47,440 (day)
- Affiliations: Ten Schools Admission Organization
- Website: www.loomischaffee.org

The Loomis Chaffee School (/ˈluːmɪs ˈtʃeɪfi/; LC or Loomis) is an independent, coeducational, college preparatory school for boarding and day students in grades 9–12, including postgraduate students, located in Windsor, Connecticut, seven miles north of Hartford. As of the 2024–2025 school year, 70 percent of Loomis Chaffee's 742 students reside on the school's 300-acre (120 ha) campus and represent 51 foreign countries and 27 U.S. states; the remaining 30 percent are day students.

Founded in 1914, Loomis Chaffee is a member of the Ten Schools Admission Organization.

== History ==
The school was chartered in 1874 as The Loomis Institute by five Loomis siblings, who were determined to turn tragedy into generosity after all of their own children died before the age of 21. The original 1640 Loomis Homestead was chosen as the site for the school, which opened in 1914. The forty-year gap between chartering and the opening of the school was due to the estate of the Loomis siblings being reserved for the siblings' retirement.

In 1910, John Mason Loomis's widow left over $1.1 million as an endowment to The Loomis Institute. This donation allowed the school to remain tuition-free for its first four decades. The Loomis Institute was different from other New England preparatory schools: it had no religious affiliation, offered vocational training alongside college preparatory courses, and admitted both boys and girls.

The Loomis Institute ended coeducation in 1926 when The Chaffee School was incorporated to educate girls on an adjacent campus. In 1970, the boys and girls schools merged to form The Loomis Chaffee School. Since then, the school has expanded its endowment, financial aid budget, faculty, and campus size.

== Overview ==
=== Academics ===
Loomis Chaffee serves students from grades 9-12, as well as post-graduate students. Loomis offers over 250 courses, almost 80 of which are classified as advanced or college-level. The average class size is 11 students with a 4:1 student-to-faculty ratio. Loomis had an acceptance rate of 16% for the 2024–2025 school year.

=== Athletics ===
The school is a member of the New England Preparatory School Athletic Council (NEPSAC) and competes in the Class A large school division. Loomis is also a member of The Founders League which comprises private schools located mainly in Connecticut.

== Heads of school ==
- (1914–1949): Nathaniel Horton Batchelder
- (1949–1952): William Speer
- (1952–1967): Francis Olmsted Grubbs
- (1967–1976): Frederick G. Torrey
- (1976–1996): John Ratté
- (1996–2008): Russell H. Weigel
- (2008–2024): Sheila Culbert
- (2024–Present): Jody Reilly Soja

== Notable faculty ==
Writer John Horne Burns taught at Loomis and wrote several books while there.

René Cheruy, a French soldier decorated for his service in World War I, served for many years as head of the French department and as a member of the visual arts department.

== See also ==
- John Mason Loomis – American lumber tycoon and Union colonel during the American Civil War, and one of the Loomis family financiers and co-founders of the Loomis Institute
- James Chaffee Loomis – American lawyer, politician, and co-founder of the Loomis Institute
- Osbert Burr Loomis – American portrait painter and co-founder of the Loomis Institute
