= Dwight Loomis =

American politician & judge (1821–1903)

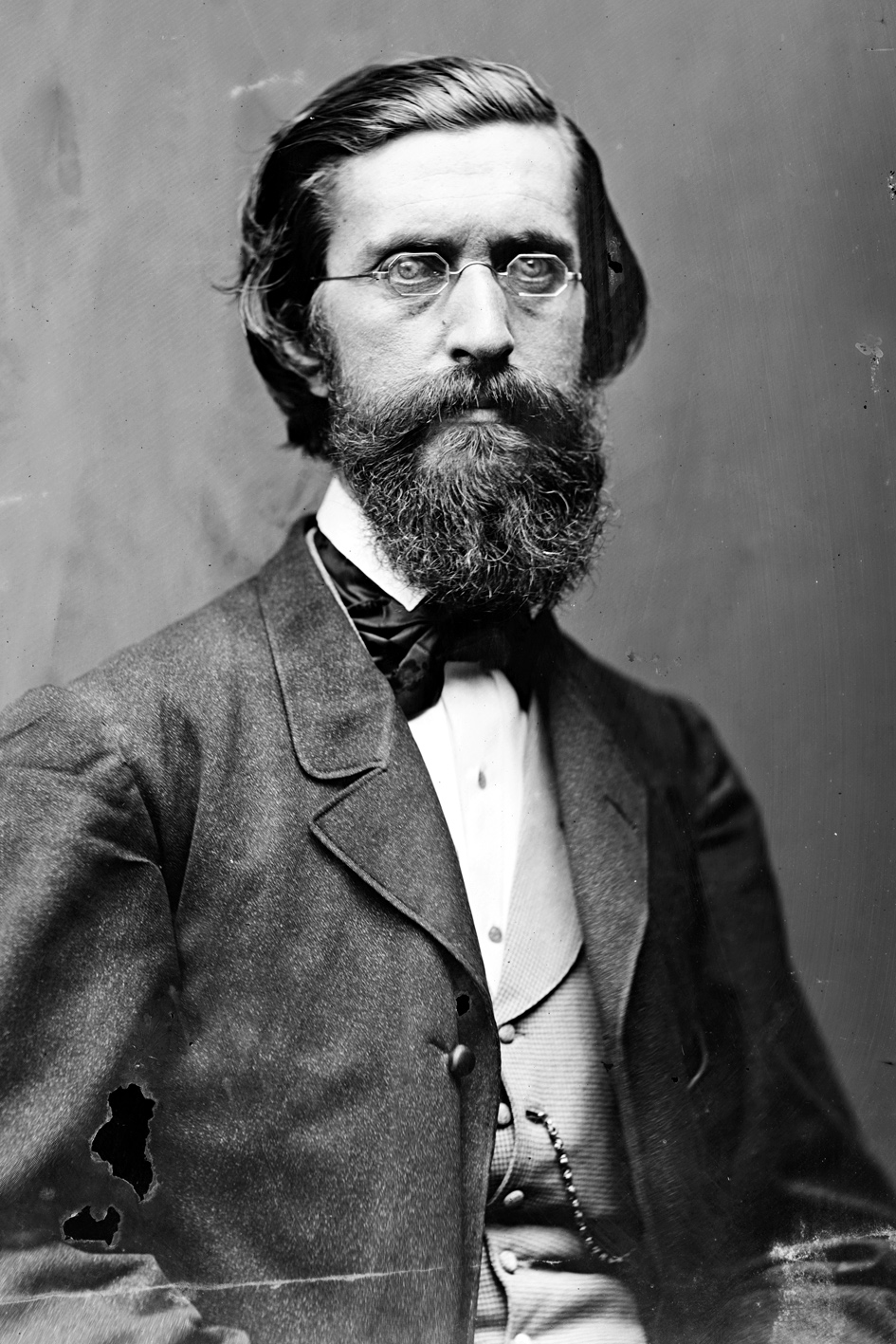

Member of the U.S. House of Representatives from Connecticut's 1st district
- In office March 4, 1859 – March 3, 1863
- Preceded by: Ezra Clark, Jr.
- Succeeded by: Henry C. Deming

Member of the Connecticut Senate
- In office 1857–1859

Member of the Connecticut House of Representatives
- In office 1851

Personal details
- Born: July 27, 1821 Columbia, Connecticut
- Died: September 17, 1903 (aged 82)
- Party: Republican

Dwight Loomis (July 27, 1821 – September 17, 1903) was an American judge and politician from Connecticut who served as a Republican member of the U.S. House of Representatives for Connecticut's 1st congressional district from 1859 to 1863. He served as a judge of the Superior Court of Connecticut from 1864 to 1875 and as a justice of the Connecticut Supreme Court from 1875 to 1891.

== Early life and education ==
He was born in Columbia, Connecticut, where he attended the common schools. He also attended the academies in Monson, Massachusetts, and Amherst, Massachusetts. In 1844, he began the study of law under John H. Brockway in Ellington, Connecticut. He entered school in the law department of Yale University and graduated in 1847. He was admitted to the bar the same year and commenced practice at Rockville, Connecticut.

== Career ==
Loomis served as a Whig member of the Connecticut House of Representatives in 1851. He switched to the Republican party after the dissolution of the Whig party and served as a delegate to the Republican National Convention in 1856. In addition, he was a member of the Connecticut Senate from 1857 to 1859.

He was elected as a Republican to the Thirty-sixth and Thirty-seventh Congresses (March 4, 1859 – March 3, 1863). While in Congress, he served as chairman, Committee on Expenditures in the Department of the Treasury (Thirty-sixth Congress). He was not a candidate for renomination in 1862.

After Congress, he served as judge of the Superior Court of Connecticut from 1864 to 1875 and a justice of the Connecticut Supreme Court from 1875 to 1891. He moved to Hartford, Connecticut, in 1892 and the general assembly elected him as State Referee in important cases. He taught classes at Yale University and the school conferred an LL.D. degree in 1896.

He died on September 17, 1903, in a train accident near Waterbury, Connecticut, and was interred in Grove Hill Cemetery in Rockville, Connecticut.

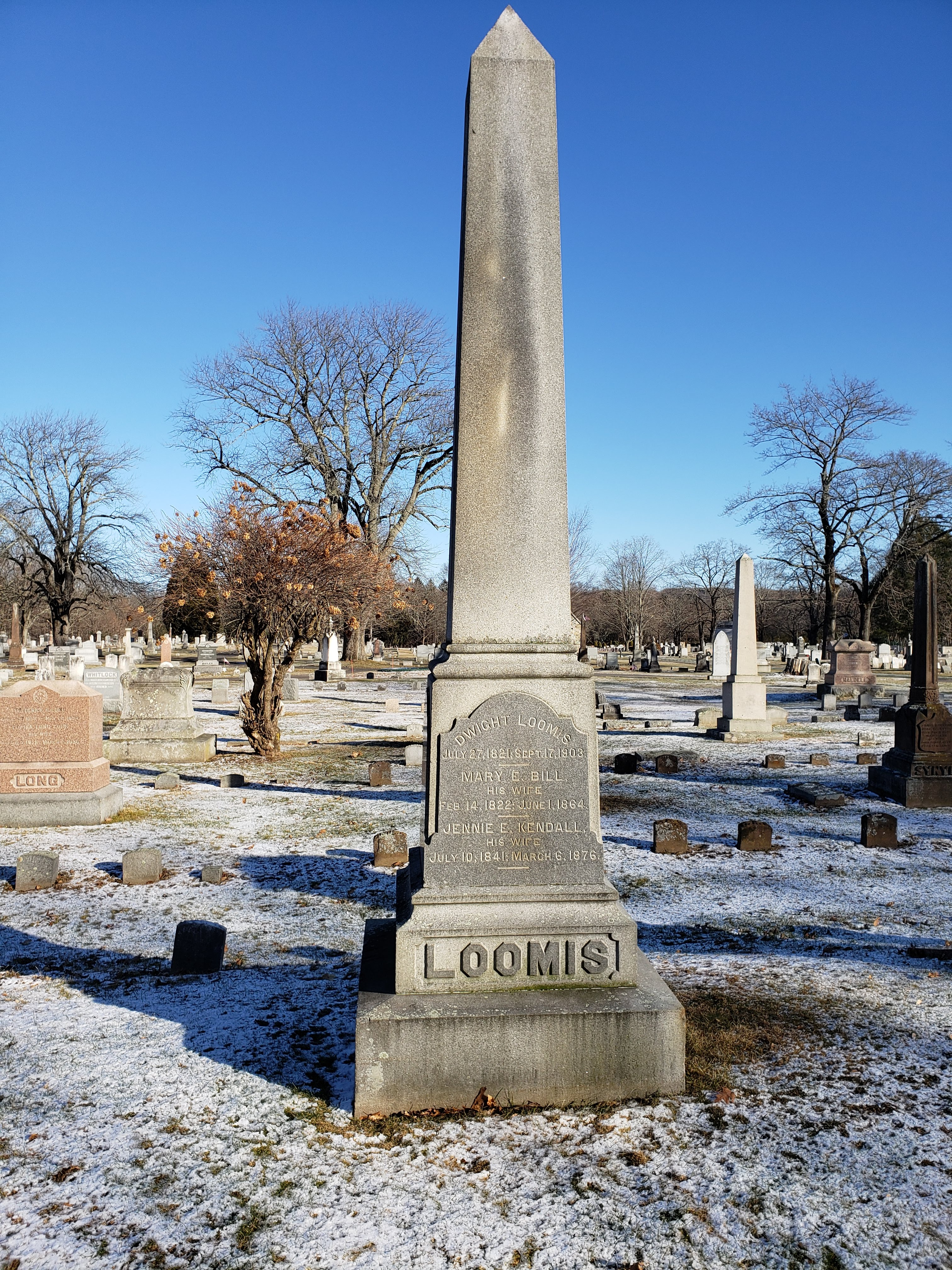
Dwight Loomis gravestone

== Footnotes ==
Connecticut House of Representatives
| Preceded by | Member of the Connecticut House of Representatives; 1851 | Succeeded by |
Connecticut State Senate
| Preceded by | Member of the Connecticut Senate; 1857-1859 | Succeeded by |
U.S. House of Representatives
| Preceded by Ezra Clark, Jr. | Member of the U.S. House of Representatives from Connecticut's 1st congressional district 1859–1863 | Succeeded by Henry C. Deming |
