= 1858 Connecticut gubernatorial election =

- April 5, 1858
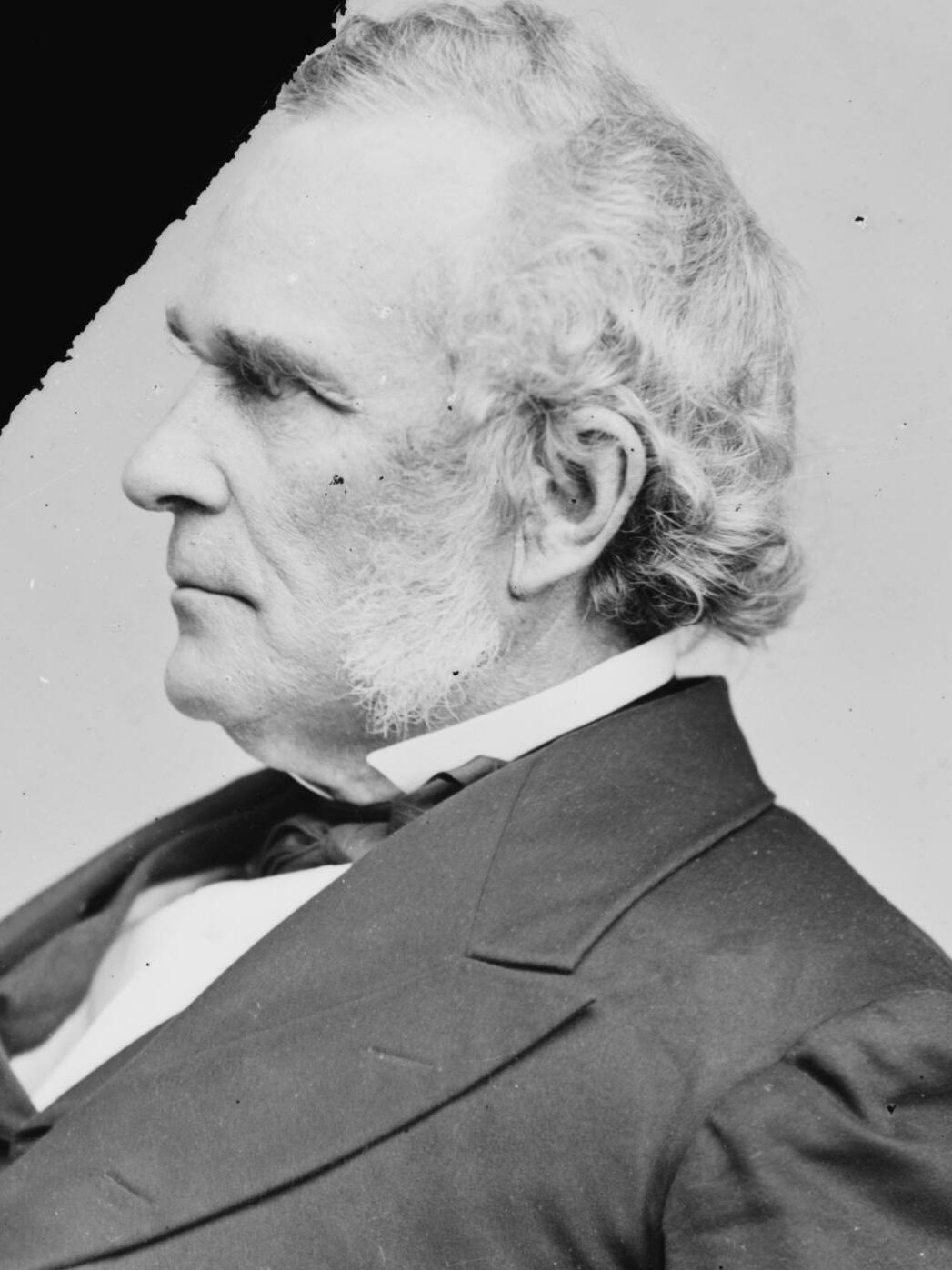

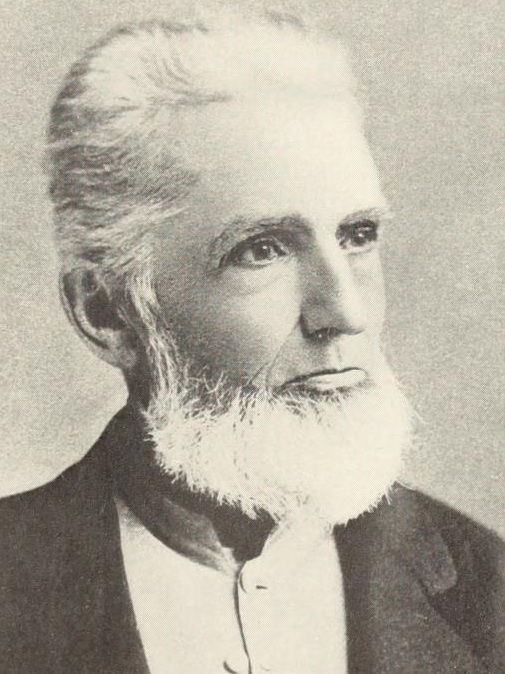
Nominee	William Alfred Buckingham	James T. Pratt
Party	Republican	Democratic
Popular vote	36,299	33,544
Percentage	51.97%	48.03%
- Buckingham: 40–50% 50–60% 60–70% 70–80% Pratt: 50–60% 60–70% 70–80% Tie: 50%
Governor before election
Alexander H. Holley
Republican
Elected Governor
William Alfred Buckingham
Republican

The 1858 Connecticut gubernatorial election was held on April 5, 1858. Former Norwich mayor and Republican nominee William Alfred Buckingham defeated former congressman and Democratic nominee James T. Pratt with 51.97% of the vote.

== General election ==
=== Candidates ===
Major party candidates

- William Alfred Buckingham, Republican
- James T. Pratt, Democratic

=== Results ===
1858 Connecticut gubernatorial election
Party	Candidate	Votes	%	±%
Republican	William Alfred Buckingham	36,299	51.97%	
Democratic	James T. Pratt	33,544	48.03%	
Majority		2,755		
Turnout				
Republican hold		Swing		
