= 1864 Connecticut gubernatorial election =

- April 4, 1864
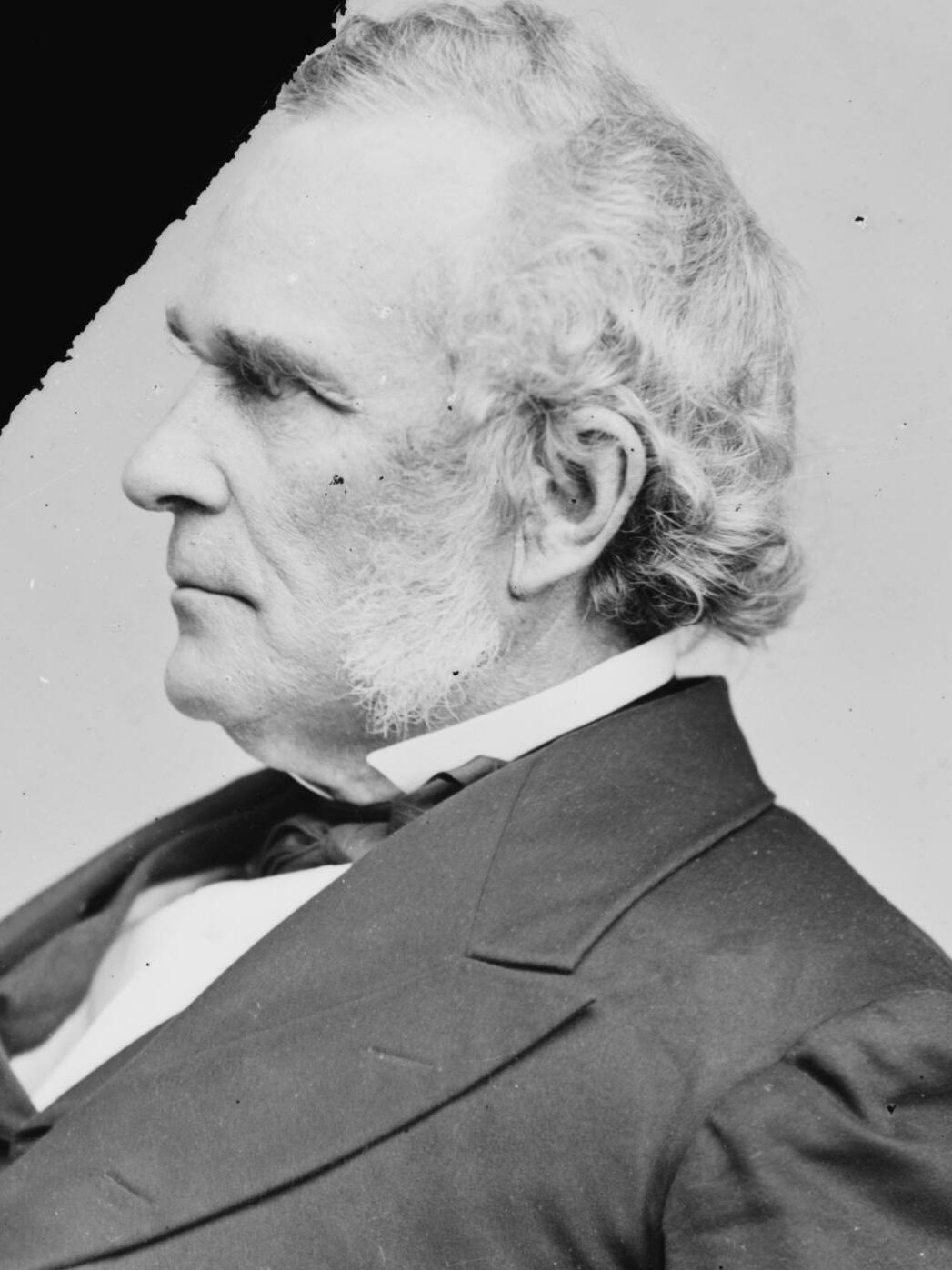

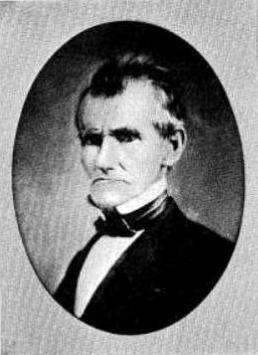
Nominee	William Alfred Buckingham	Origen S. Seymour
Party	National Union	Democratic
Popular vote	39,820	34,162
Percentage	53.65%	46.02%
- Buckingham: 50–60% 60–70% 70–80% 80–90% Seymour: 50–60% 60–70% 70–80% Tie: 50%
Governor before election
William Alfred Buckingham
National Union
Elected Governor
William Alfred Buckingham
National Union

The 1864 Connecticut gubernatorial election was held on April 4, 1864. Incumbent governor and National Union nominee William Alfred Buckingham defeated Democratic nominee Origen S. Seymour with 53.65% of the vote.

== General election ==
=== Candidates ===
Major party candidates

- William Alfred Buckingham, National Union
- Origen S. Seymour, Democratic

=== Results ===
1864 Connecticut gubernatorial election
Party	Candidate	Votes	%	±%
National Union	William Alfred Buckingham (incumbent)	39,820	53.65%	
Democratic	Origen S. Seymour	34,162	46.02%	
Other	Others	247	0.33%	
Majority		5,658		
Turnout				
National Union hold		Swing		
