= James Chaffee Loomis =

American politician (1807–1877)

Personal details
- Born: April 1807 Windsor, Connecticut, U.S.
- Died: September 16, 1877 (aged 70) South Egremont, Massachusetts, U.S.
- Resting place: Mountain Grove Cemetery; Bridgeport, Connecticut, U.S.
- Party: Democratic
- Spouse(s): Eliza C. Mitchell (m. 1833; died 1840) Mary B. Sherman (m. 1844)
- Children: 3
- Relatives: Osbert Burr Loomis (brother)
- Education: Yale College; University of Virginia School of Law; Yale Law School
- Occupation: Politician; lawyer

James Chaffee Loomis (April 1807 – September 16, 1877) was an American lawyer and politician from Connecticut. He served in the Connecticut Senate and Connecticut House of Representatives. He was mayor of Bridgeport, Connecticut, in 1843.

== Early life ==
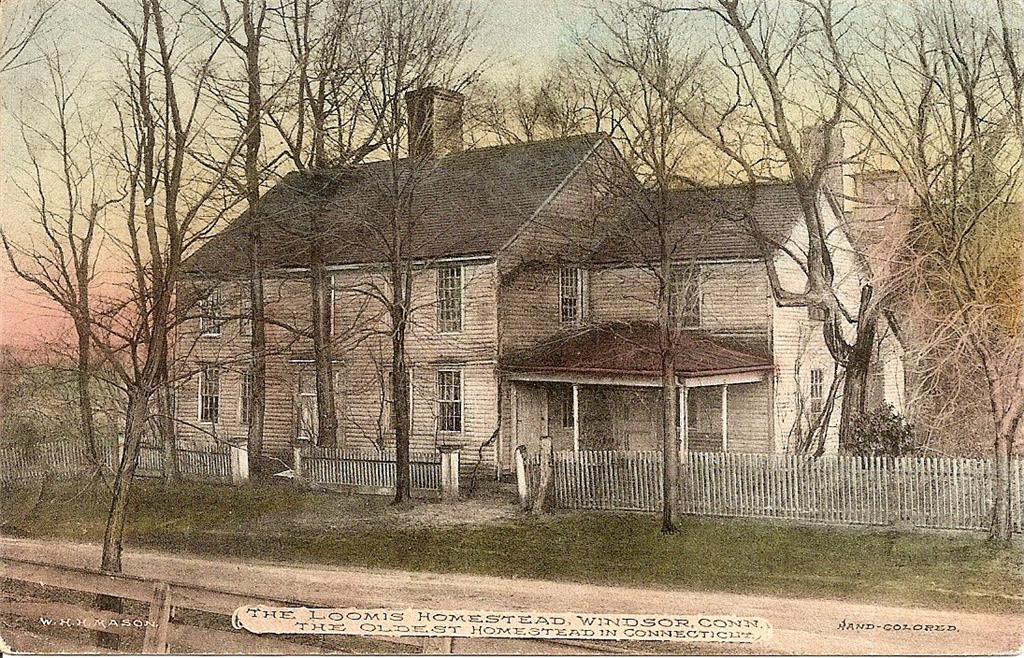
Loomis Homestead in Windsor

James Chaffee Loomis was born on April 24 or 29, 1807, in Windsor, Connecticut, to Abigail S. (née Chaffee) and James Loomis. His brother was Osbert Burr Loomis. He attended a grammar school in Hartford. He graduated from Yale College in 1828. He then studied law at the University of Virginia School of Law. After a year, he returned to Connecticut and studied at Yale Law School and then studied under Clark Bissell in Norwalk. He was admitted to the bar of Fairfield County in 1832.

== Career ==
Loomis began practicing law with Samuel B. Sherwood of Saugatuck (later Westport). From 1837 to 1838, he was an ex-officio member of Yale College. In 1840, he moved to Bridgeport to practice law. In 1848, he started a law practice with George W. Warner. He became city attorney of Bridgeport and served as its mayor in 1843.

Loomis was elected to the Connecticut Senate, representing the 10th district, around 1835. He served as a member of the Connecticut House of Representatives in 1856 and 1860. In 1861 and 1862, he was an unsuccessful Democratic candidate for governor of Connecticut and was defeated by William A. Buckingham. Around 1870, he retired from active practice.

Loomis was president of the Congregational Society from 1847 to around 1860. At the time of his death, he was president of the Fairfield County Bar Association, president of Bridgeport's Board of Education, president of Mountain Grove Cemetery and president of the Bridgeport Library Association. He was director of Bridgeport's City National Bank and trustee of the People's Saving Bank.

== Personal life ==
Loomis married Eliza C. Mitchell of New Haven on May 1, 1833. They had one son. His wife died in 1840. He married Mary B. Sherman, daughter of Ira Sherman, of Bridgeport on April 24, 1844. They had one son and daughter, including James Sherman. He had a home on Golden Hill in Bridgeport.

Loomis traveled on August 18, 1877, to South Egremont, Massachusetts. He fell ill with a gastric fever two days later and died there on September 16. He was buried in Mountain Grove Cemetery in Bridgeport.

== Legacy ==
In 1874, the Connecticut legislature passed a law naming Loomis and his brothers and sister as trustees of Loomis Institute, an institute for "the free education of children and youth between 12 and 20 years of age" in Windsor. Following his death, Loomis donated a portion of his approximately US$500,000 estate to the school.

Party political offices
Preceded by Thomas H. Seymour	Democratic nominee for Governor of Connecticut; 1861, 1862	Succeeded by Thomas H. Seymour
