= William A. Buckingham =

American politician (1804–1875)

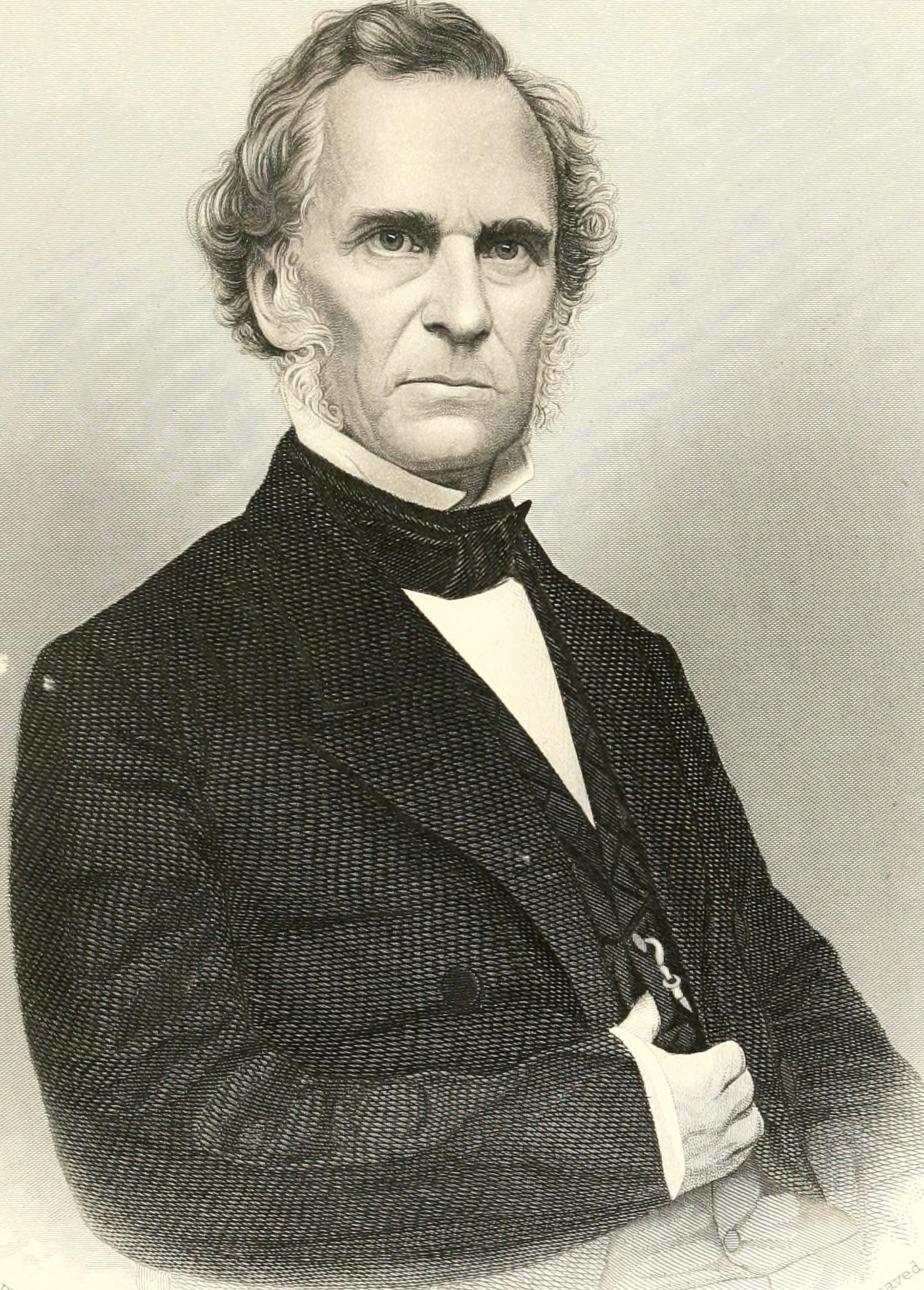

41st Governor of Connecticut
- In office May 5, 1858 – May 2, 1866
- Lieutenant: Julius Catlin; Benjamin Douglas; Roger Averill
- Preceded by: Alexander H. Holley
- Succeeded by: Joseph R. Hawley

United States Senator from Connecticut
- In office March 4, 1869 – February 5, 1875
- Preceded by: James Dixon
- Succeeded by: William W. Eaton

Personal details
- Born: May 28, 1804 Lebanon, Connecticut, U.S.
- Died: February 5, 1875 (aged 70) Norwich, Connecticut, U.S.
- Resting place: Yantic Cemetery, Norwich
- Party: Republican; National Union (1864-1866)
- Spouse: Eliza Ripley Buckingham
- Children: 2
- Profession: Manufacturer, politician

William Alfred Buckingham (May 28, 1804 – February 5, 1875) was an American politician who served as the governor of Connecticut during the Civil War and later as a United States senator.

== Biography ==
Born in Lebanon, Connecticut, the son of Samuel Buckingham (1770–1850) and Joanna (Matson) Buckingham (1777–1846), Buckingham attended the common schools and Bacon Academy in Colchester, Connecticut, but never attended college. He was married on September 30, 1830, to Eliza Ripley, daughter of Dwight and Eliza (Coit) Ripley of Norwich. The couple had two children. William Ripley Buckingham was born October 27, 1836, and died in early childhood on December 12, 1838. Eliza Coit Buckingham was born December 7, 1838, and married William A. Aiken on August 28, 1862.

== Career ==
Buckingham entered into a career in the mercantile industry, and in 1848 helped to organize the Hayward Rubber Company, a business that developed into a successful enterprise.

Buckingham served as the mayor of Norwich, Connecticut, from 1849 to 1850, and again from 1856 to 1857. He also served as Norwich's town treasurer and a member of the city council.

Winning the 1858 Republican gubernatorial nomination, Buckingham was elected in 1858 and served as the 41st governor of Connecticut. He was reelected to the governorship each of the next seven years, in 1859, 1860, 1861, 1862, 1863, 1864 and 1865, serving from May 5, 1858, until May 2, 1866. During his tenure, he dealt successfully with the effects of an economic panic that occurred in the state and with the outbreak of the Civil war. Buckingham arranged for troops, with 54 companies enlisting instead of 10. Before the General Assembly appropriated $2 million for military expenses, Buckingham had begun borrowing money in his own name to finance Connecticut's war efforts.

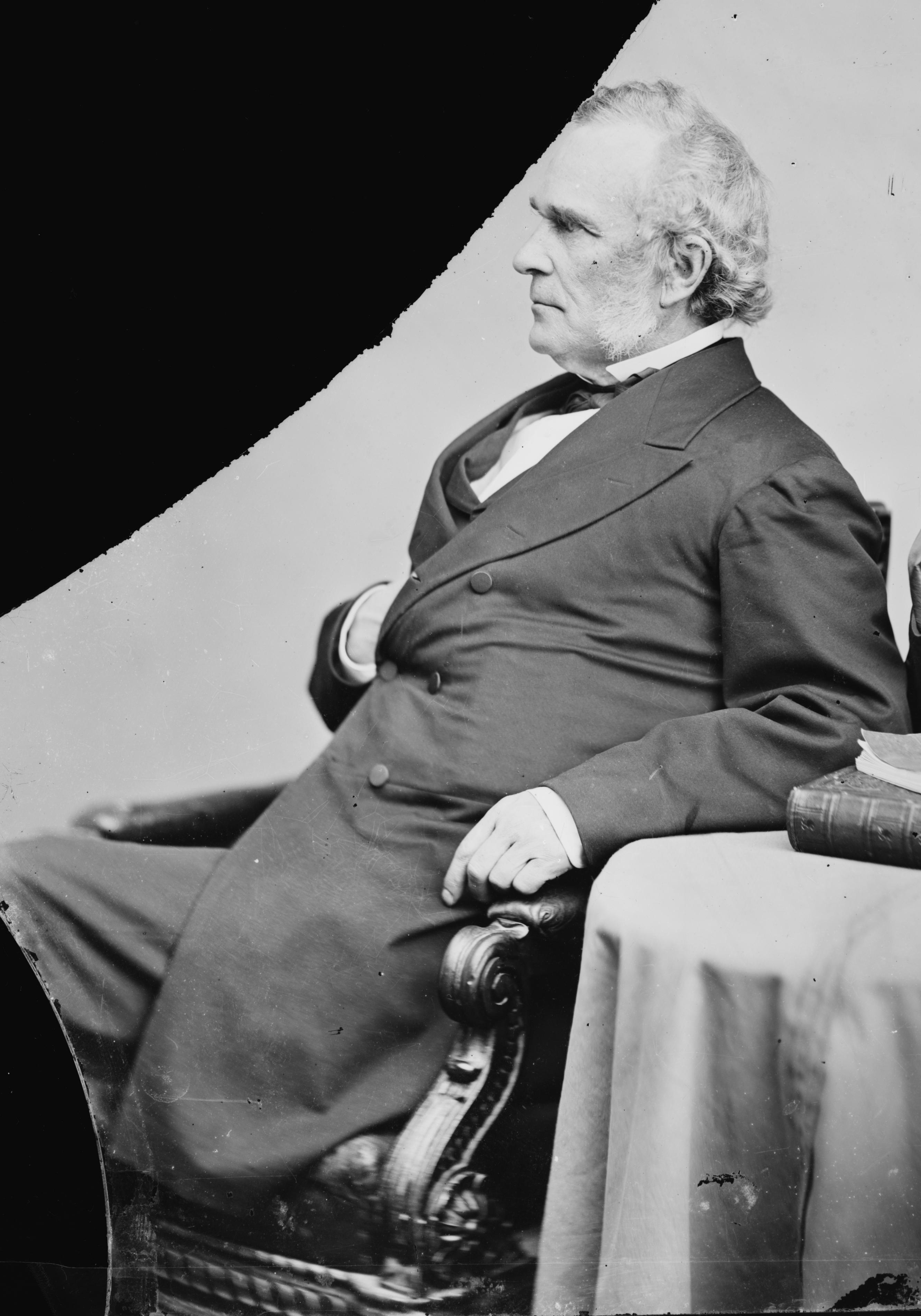
Damaged negative of Brady-Handy photo of Buckingham, probably as a U.S. Senator, circa 1869.

The outbreak of the Civil War was the major reason for Buckingham's long tenure as Connecticut's governor. A strong supporter of Abraham Lincoln, he hosted Lincoln when Lincoln campaigned in Connecticut, and a personal friendship formed between them. When the President called on the Northern governors to assist him in prosecuting the war, Buckingham worked seven days a week, twelve hours a day. The state's major correspondent with the Federal government, he read and answered letters from troops in the field and visited troops at war as well as at home. Concerned for the welfare of Connecticut troops, he oversaw much of the procurement of men and materials for the war, and he is quoted as saying to an official in Washington: "Don't let any Connecticut man suffer for want of anything that can be done for him. If it costs money, draw on me for it." It is estimated that Connecticut sent 54,882 soldiers to fight in the Civil War.(3) In 1862, the United States Congress passed an act allowing for the enlistment of colored soldiers, and in November 1863, Buckingham persuaded the Connecticut General Assembly to authorize a state regiment of black soldiers, the first of which was to be the Twenty-Ninth. Buckingham is known as a "War Governor" for his work.

Buckingham declined renomination in 1866, and after leaving office, was elected to the U.S. Senate on March 4, 1869, and served until his death on February 5, 1875. While in the Senate, Buckingham served as chairman of the U.S. Senate Committee on Engrossed Bills, the U.S. Senate Committee on Investigation and Retrenchment, and the U.S. Senate Committee on Indian Affairs.

== Death and legacy ==
Buckingham died in Norwich on February 5, 1875. He is interred at Yantic Cemetery, Norwich, Connecticut.

The ship USS Governor Buckingham (1863) is named after him. Buckingham was a benefactor of Yale College and served as president of the Board of Trustees of Norwich Free Academy and as president of the Connecticut State Temperance Union. His house in Norwich is owned by the city and is listed on the National Register of Historical Places. A street and school are named in his honor in Norwich, and a statue of him is inside the State Capitol Building in Hartford.

Buckingham's house in Norwich is listed on the National Register of Historic Places.

== See also ==
- List of members of the United States Congress who died in office (1790–1899)

Party political offices
Preceded by Alexander H. Holley	Republican nominee for Governor of Connecticut; 1858, 1859, 1860, 1861, 1862, 1863, 1864, 1865	Succeeded by Joseph Roswell Hawley
Political offices
Preceded by Alexander H. Holley	Governor of Connecticut; 1858–1866	Succeeded by Joseph R. Hawley
U.S. Senate
Preceded by James Dixon	U.S. senator (Class 1) from Connecticut; 1869–1875; Served alongside: Orris S. Ferry	Succeeded by William W. Eaton
