= 1860 Connecticut gubernatorial election =

- April 2, 1860
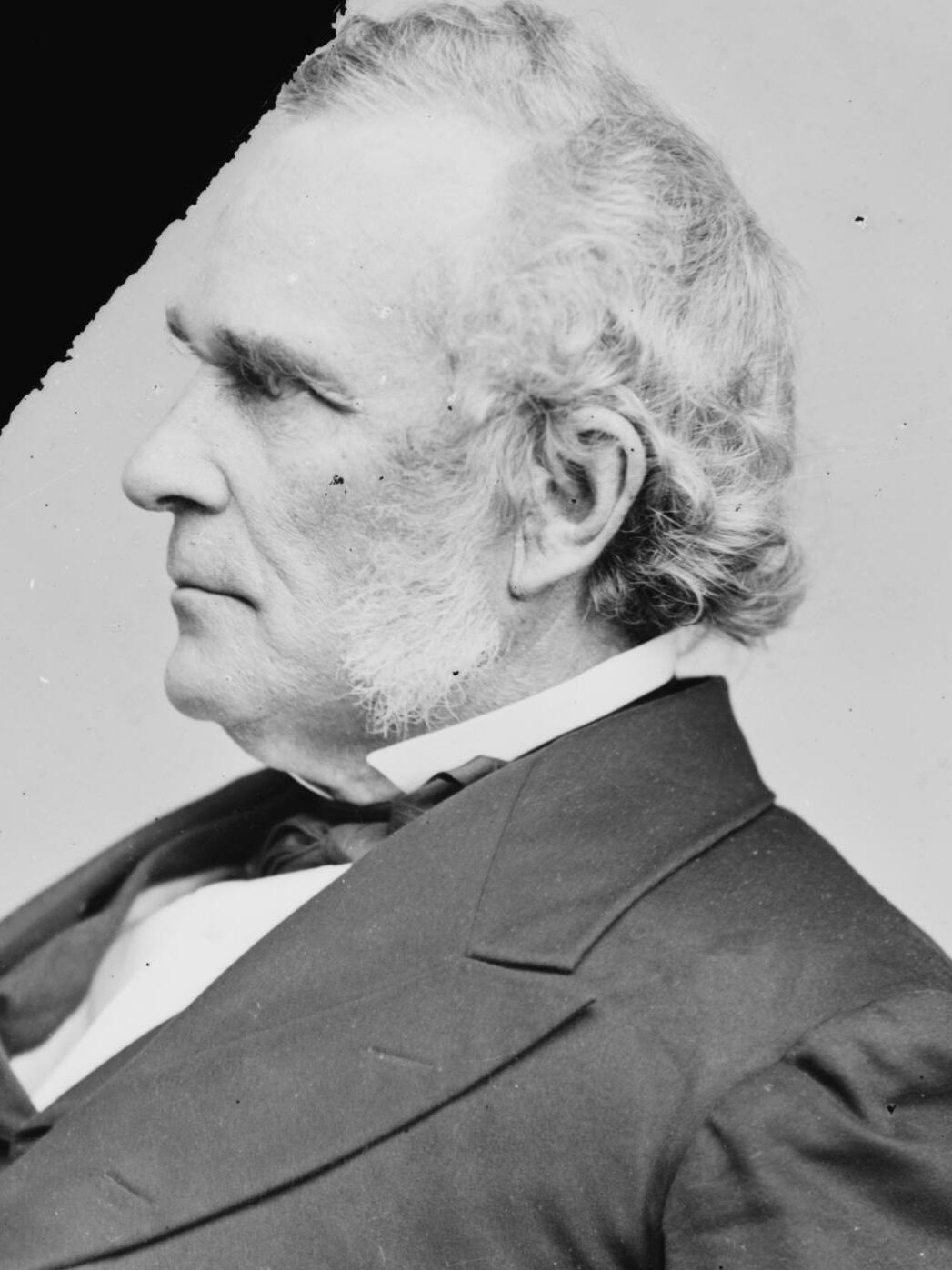

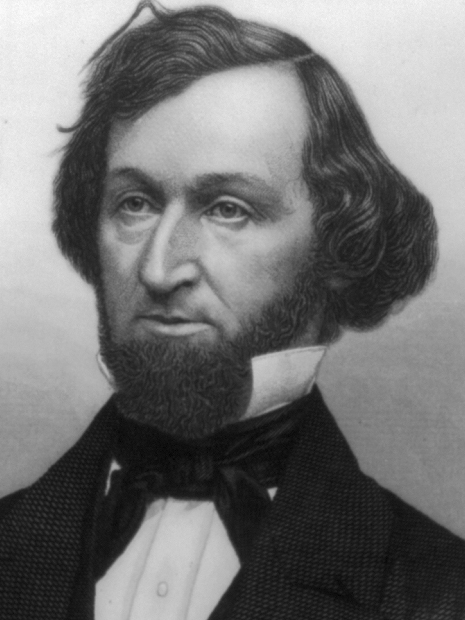
Nominee	William Alfred Buckingham	Thomas H. Seymour
Party	Republican	Democratic
Popular vote	44,458	43,920
Percentage	50.30%	49.70%
- Buckingham: 50–60% 60–70% 70–80% Seymour: 50–60% 60–70% 70–80% Tie
Governor before election
William Alfred Buckingham
Republican
Elected Governor
William Alfred Buckingham
Republican

The 1860 Connecticut gubernatorial election was held on April 2, 1860. Incumbent governor and Republican nominee William Alfred Buckingham defeated former governor and Democratic nominee Thomas H. Seymour with 50.30% of the vote.

== General election ==
=== Candidates ===
Major party candidates

- William Alfred Buckingham, Republican
- Thomas H. Seymour, Democratic

=== Results ===
1860 Connecticut gubernatorial election
Party	Candidate	Votes	%	±%
Republican	William Alfred Buckingham (incumbent)	44,458	50.30%	
Democratic	Thomas H. Seymour	43,920	49.70%	
Majority		538		
Turnout				
Republican hold		Swing		
