= George Shelton =

George Shelton may refer to:

- George Henry Shelton (1871–1920), U.S. Army soldier
- George M. Shelton (1877–1949), U.S. Army soldier and Medal of Honor recipient
- George Shelton (footballer, born 1894) (1894–1960), English footballer
- George Shelton (footballer, born 1899) (1899–1934), English footballer
- George P. Shelton (1820–1902), Adjutant General for the State of Connecticut
- George Shelton (actor) (1884–1971), American actor and comedian
