= General Shelton =

General Shelton may refer to:

- George Henry Shelton (1871–1920), U.S. Army brigadier general
- Hugh Shelton (born 1942), U.S. Army four-star general
- William L. Shelton (born 1954), U.S. Air Force four-star general
