= John Hollister =

John Hollister may refer to:

- John B. Hollister (1890–1979), U.S. Representative from Ohio
- John C. Hollister (1818–?), Adjutant General of Connecticut
- John J. Hollister Jr. (1901–1961), agriculturalist, banker, and California state senator
- John W. Hollister (1869–1950), American football player and coach
