= Mission Delta 31 =

US Space Force unit

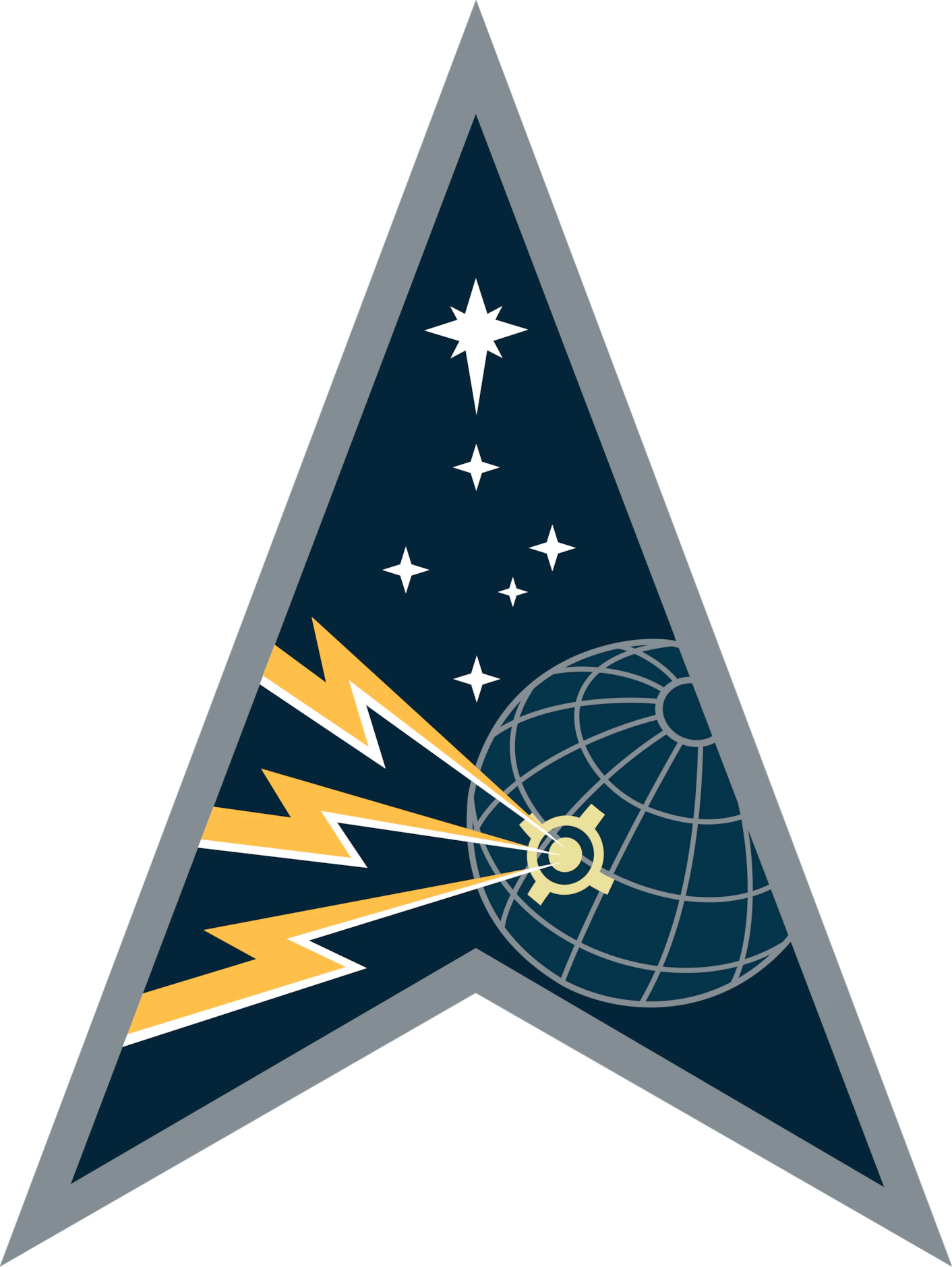
- Mission Delta 31 emblem
- Founded: 15 October 2024; 23 months ago
- Country: United States
- Branch: United States Space Force
- Type: Delta
- Role: Navigation warfare
- Part of: United States Space Force Combat Forces Command
- Headquarters: Peterson Space Force Base, Colorado
- Website: Official website

Commanders
- Commander: Col Stephen A. Hobbs
- Deputy Director: Col Justin B. Spring
- Senior Enlisted Leader: CMSgt Joshua I. Griffin

Insignia
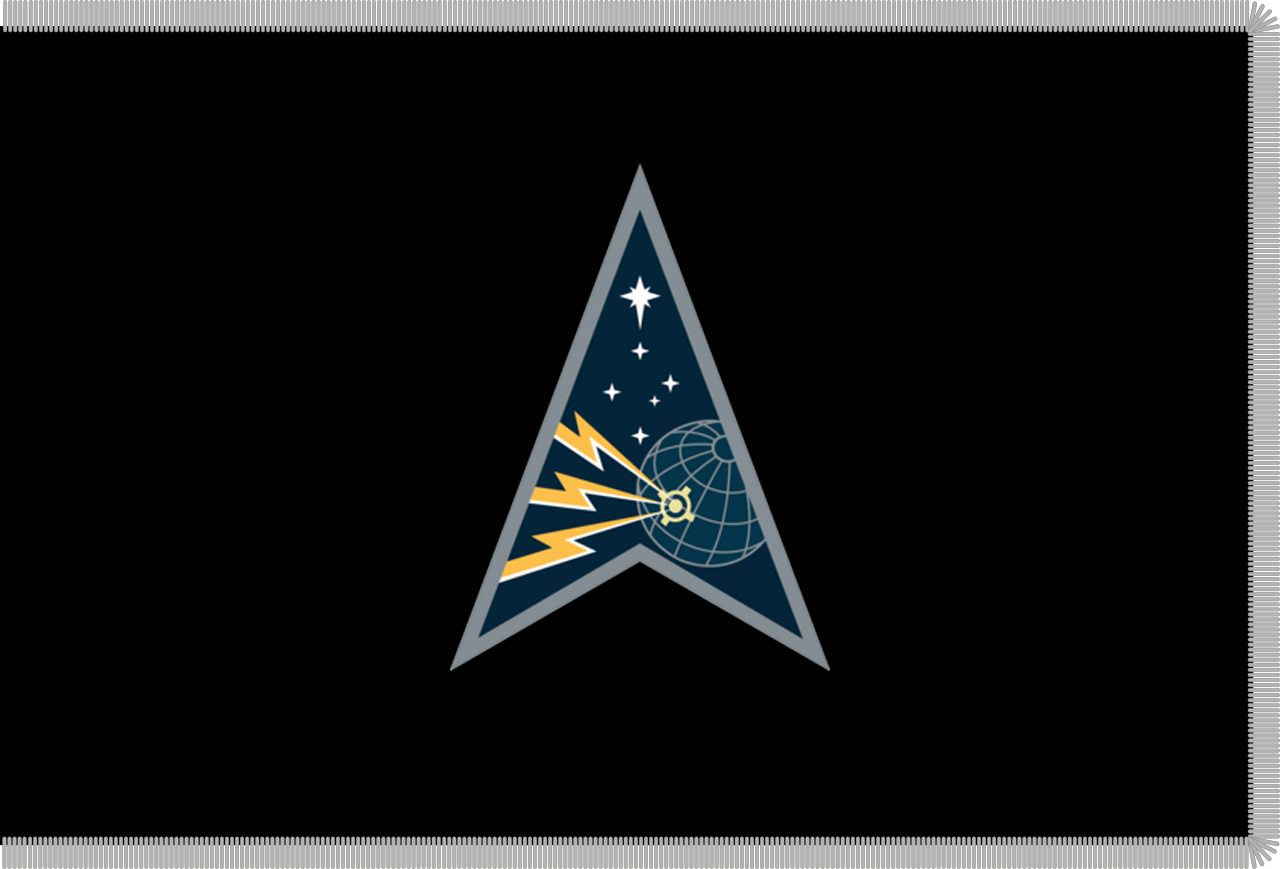
- MISSION DELTA 31 FLAG

Mission Delta 31 (MD31) is a United States Space Force unit responsible for navigation warfare. It was activated on 15 October 2024.

== History ==
In September 2023, General B. Chance Saltzman introduced the Integrated Mission Delta (IMD) construct which combines functions, like operations, acquisitions, intelligence, and cyber effects, into specific mission areas, including positioning, navigation, and timing (PNT). Mission Delta 31 (formerly PNT IMD (Provisional)) was one of two initial units announced to test the construct. These IMDs mission generation, intelligence support, and cyber defense.

On 13 October 2023, PNT IMD (Provisional) was established at Peterson Space Force Base, Colorado, with Colonel Andrew S. Menschner as its first commander. On 16 October 2023, the Logistics and Operations Support Squadron (Provisional) was activated to provide operations support services and modifications to all GPS satellite constellation fielded ground and satellite systems. On 15 October 2024, Mission Delta 31 was activated at Peterson Space Force Base, Colorado.

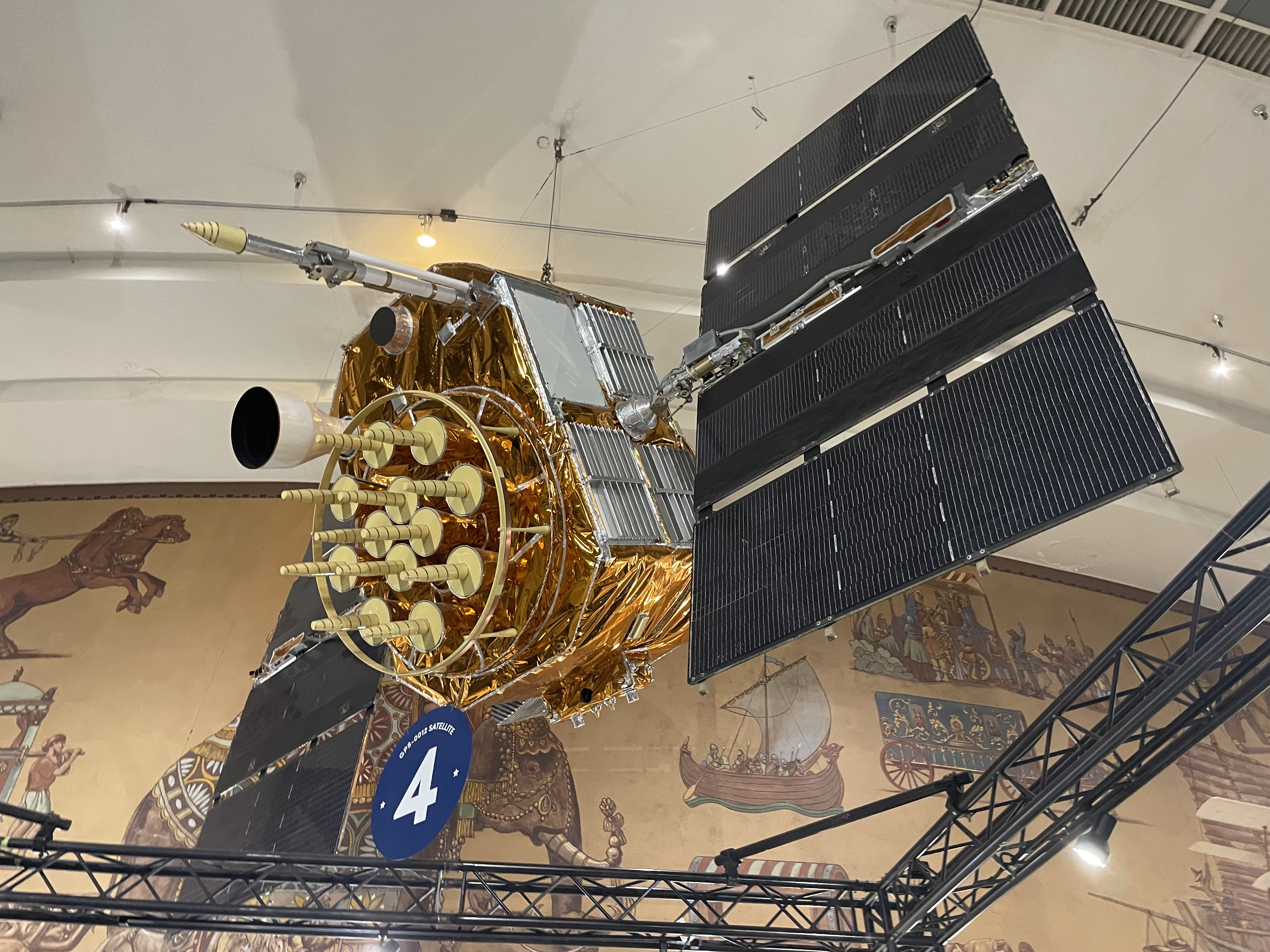
Unflown example of a GPS Block II operated by Mission Delta 31

On 15 October the PNT Delta (Provisional) was redesignated Mission Delta 31.

== Structure ==
Emblem	Name	Function	Headquarters	Equipment
	2nd Navigation Warfare Squadron (2 NWS)	Navigation warfare	Schriever Space Force Base, Colorado	Navstar Global Positioning System (GPS)
	31st Capabilities Development Squadron	Software Engineering and Ground Equipment	Los Angeles Air Force Base, California	Next Generation Operational Control Segment (OCX)
	31st Sustainment Squadron, Detachment 1	Spacecraft Transport Logistics, Launch, and Early Orbit Checkout	Los Angeles Air Force Base, California	
	31st Sustainment Squadron	Logistics and Product Support	Peterson Space Force Base, Colorado	

== List of commanders ==
No.	Commander		Term			Ref
No.	Portrait	Name	Took office	Left office	Duration	Ref
1	Andrew S. Menschner	Colonel; Andrew S. Menschner	13 October 2023	27 June 2025	1 year, 257 days	
2	Stephen A. Hobbs	Colonel; Stephen A. Hobbs	27 June 2025	Incumbent	1 year, 95 days	
