= Elihu W. N. Starr =

General Elihu W. N. Starr
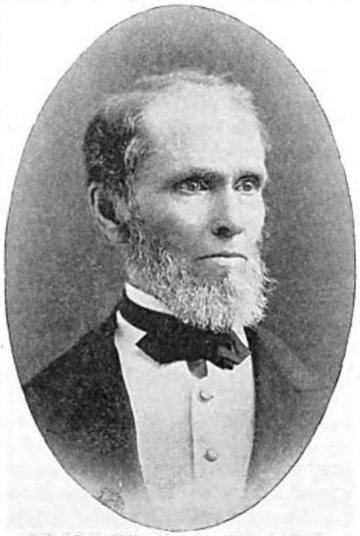
- Born: Elihu William Nathan Starr; August 10, 1812; New Haven, CT, US
- Died: June 14, 1891 (aged 78); Middletown, CT, US
- Spouse: Harriet Wetmore Bush (m. 1840)
- Military career
- Allegiance: United States
- Branch: United States Army
- Rank: Major General
- Commands: Connecticut State Militia; Second Brigade, Connecticut Militia
- Website: www.ct.gov/mil

Elihu William Nathan Starr (August 10, 1812 – June 14, 1891) was the ninth Adjutant General of the State of Connecticut. He was later elected to the position of town clerk for the City of Middletown. He also served as treasurer and Judge of Probate.

== Military career ==
At the age of 18, Starr was appointed sergeant major into the Second Artillery Regiment in the Connecticut militia. He was later appointed to quartermaster and then as adjutant. In 1836 he was elected captain of the First Rifle Company, Sixth Infantry Regiment. In 1839 he was promoted to the rank of lieutenant colonel and then elected as brigadier general of the Second Brigade, Connecticut Militia. In 1852, Starr was appointed to the position of Connecticut Adjutant General by Governor Thomas H. Seymour.

== Personal life ==
Elihu was born in New Haven, Connecticut on August 10, 1812, the eldest son of Nathan and Grace Starr. The family moved from New Haven to Middletown shortly after Elihu's birth. On May 27, 1840, he married Harriet Wetmore Bush of Ogdensburg, New York, and had seven children; William, Henry, Frank, Grace, Julia, Margaret and Mary. Elihu died June 14, 1891, in Middletown. His wife died in 1904.

Military offices
Preceded by George P. Shelton	Connecticut Adjutant General; 1852–1853	Succeeded by John C. Hollister
