= Jennifer L. Grant =

U.S. Air Force general

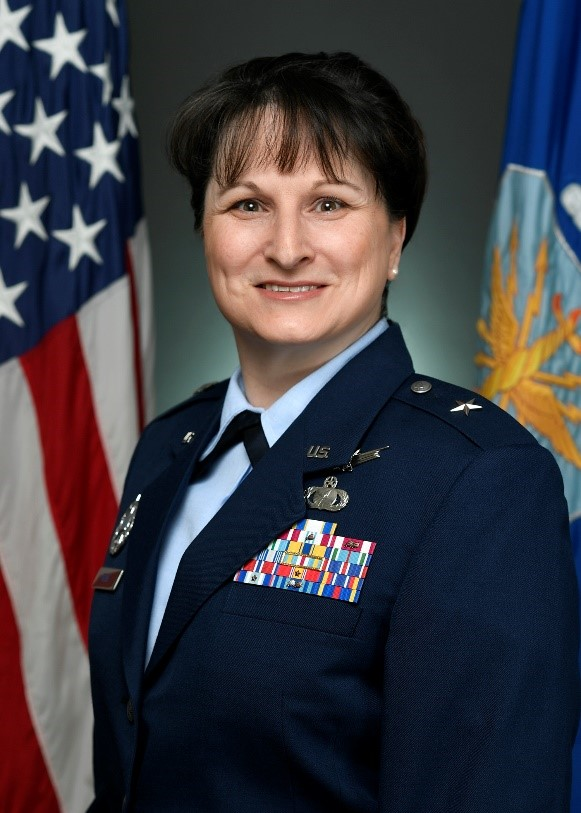
- Official portrait, 2023
- Born: c. 1973 (age 52–53); Derry, New Hampshire, U.S.
- Military career
- Allegiance: United States
- Branch: United States Air Force
- Service years: 1995–2023
- Rank: Brigadier General
- Commands: 50th Space Wing; 30th Operations Group; 2nd Space Operations Squadron
- Awards: Air Force Distinguished Service Medal; Legion of Merit (2)

Jennifer Lee Grant (born c. 1973) is a retired United States Air Force brigadier general who last served as the first director of plans and programs of the United States Space Force from 2020 to 2023.

An Air Force Inspector General report on Grant's time leading the 50th Space Wing from June 2017 to June 2019 was released in October 2019. Among other criticisms, the report "determined the conditions Col. Grant created were the worst the IG team had seen in 20 years.” Inspectors identified three significant incidents for further examination, including one airman, whom Grant bullied, who died by suicide in 2019. Grant was nominated to become a brigadier general on Nov. 26, 2018. The Senate approved her nomination in December 2018, about 10 months before the report on her leadership deficiencies was released. She put on the rank of brigadier general in July 2020.

Grant retired from active duty on March 1, 2023.

Military offices
Preceded by DeAnna Burt	Commander of the 2nd Space Operations Squadron; 2010–2012	Succeeded by Thomas Ste. Marie
Preceded by Marcelino E. Del Rosario Jr.	Commander of the 30th Operations Group; 2015–2017	Succeeded by Curtis Hernandez
Preceded by DeAnna Burt	Commander of the 50th Space Wing; 2017–2019	Succeeded by James E. Smith
Preceded by Lorenzo Bradley	Chief of the Space Superiority Division of the United States Air Force; 2019–2020	Division transferred
New title	Director of Plans and Programs of the United States Space Force; 2020–2022	Succeeded by Robert Hutt
