= George P. Shelton =

American adjutant general

General George P. Shelton
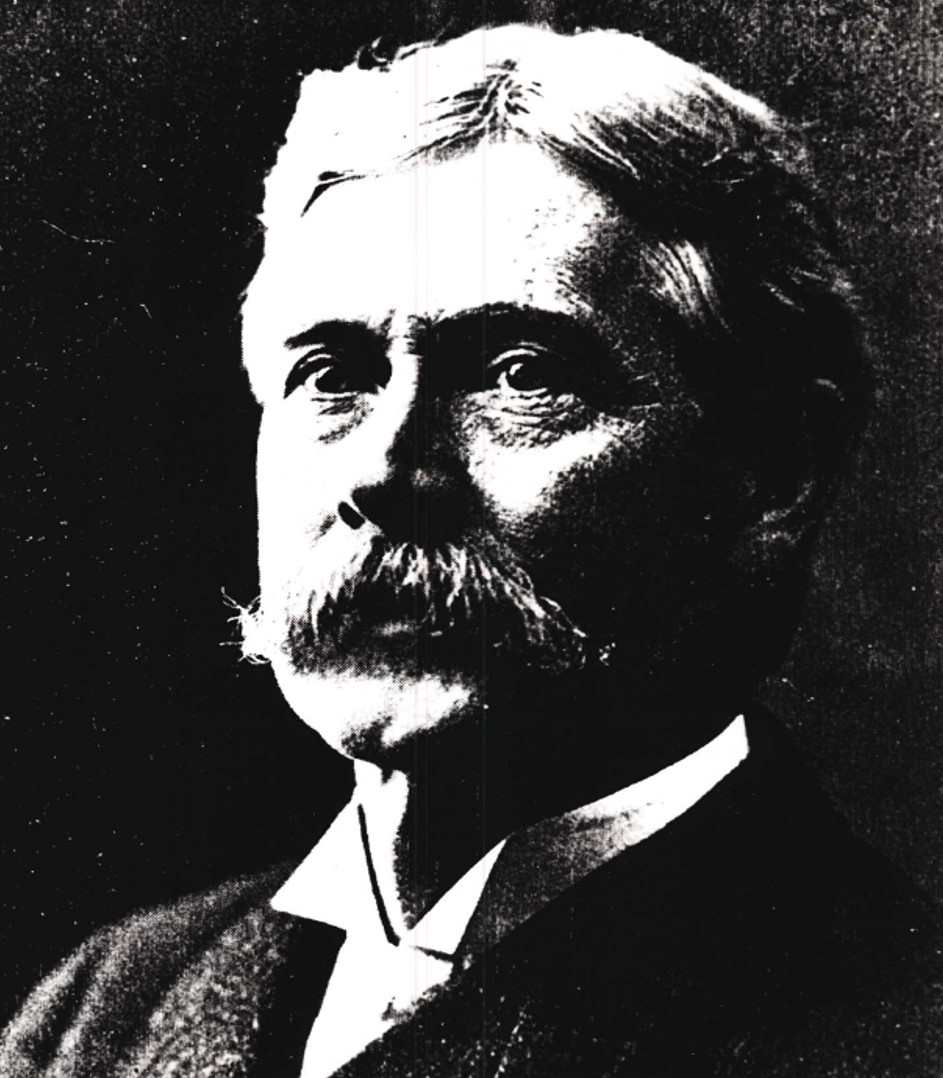
- George P. Shelton
- Born: September 7, 1820; Southbury, Connecticut, U.S.
- Died: October 16, 1902 (aged 82); Seymour, Connecticut, U.S.
- Burial place: Trinity Cemetery
- Spouse: Mary Lambert Webster
- Relatives: George Henry Shelton (son)
- Military career
- Allegiance: United States
- Branch: United States Army
- Rank: Major General
- Commands: Connecticut State Militia

George Pierce Shelton, born in Southbury, Connecticut, on September 7, 1820, was the Adjutant General for the State of Connecticut from 1848 to 1851. In addition to serving as the Adjutant General, he served in the Connecticut State Legislature and as the Town Clerk for the city of Seymour, Connecticut

== Career ==
George P. Shelton was elected as Major General of the Connecticut 3rd Division of Militia in 1845.

George P. Shelton was appointed to the position of Adjutant General of the State of Connecticut in 1848 at the age of 28 under Governor Clark Bissell. He served in this position until 1851.

In 1852, he and several others were incorporated as the Seymour Savings Bank, in which he was the director. In 1855, George was appointed as President of the Eagle Manufacturing Company, a company that was organized on June 27, 1850, with a stock value of $50,000.00 for the manufacture of silk good, wool and cotton.

== Personal life ==
George married Mary Lambert Webster in 1862 and had two children by her; Isabel Shelton born in Seymour who married Albert James Middlebrook and George Henry Shelton, who would also attain the military rank of brigadier general.

== Death and legacy ==
George Pierce Shelton died on October 16, 1902, and is buried at the Trinity Cemetery in Seymour.

Military offices
Preceded by James T. Pratt	Connecticut Adjutant General; 1848-1851	Succeeded by Elihu W.N. Starr
