= 2nd Navigation Warfare Squadron =

Space Force unit managing GPS constellation

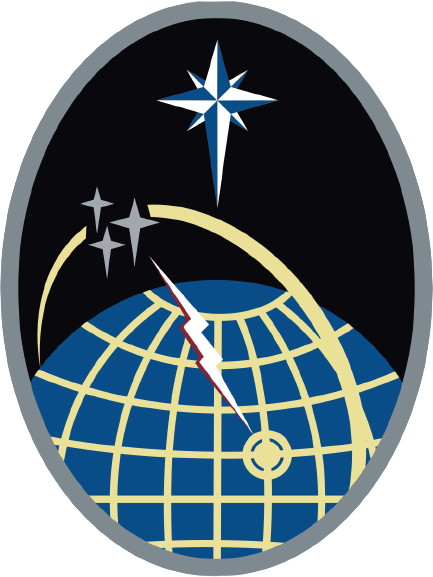
- Squadron emblem
- Active: 1962–1967; 1985–present
- Country: United States
- Branch: United States Space Force
- Role: Global Positioning System Command and Control
- Part of: Mission Delta 31
- Garrison/HQ: Schriever Space Force Base, Colorado
- Motto: Pathways for Peace (1988–present)
- Engagements: Global war on terrorism

- Decorations: Air Force Outstanding Unit Award

Commanders
- Current commander: Lt Col Lauren Shipp
- Notable commanders: DeAnna Burt

Insignia
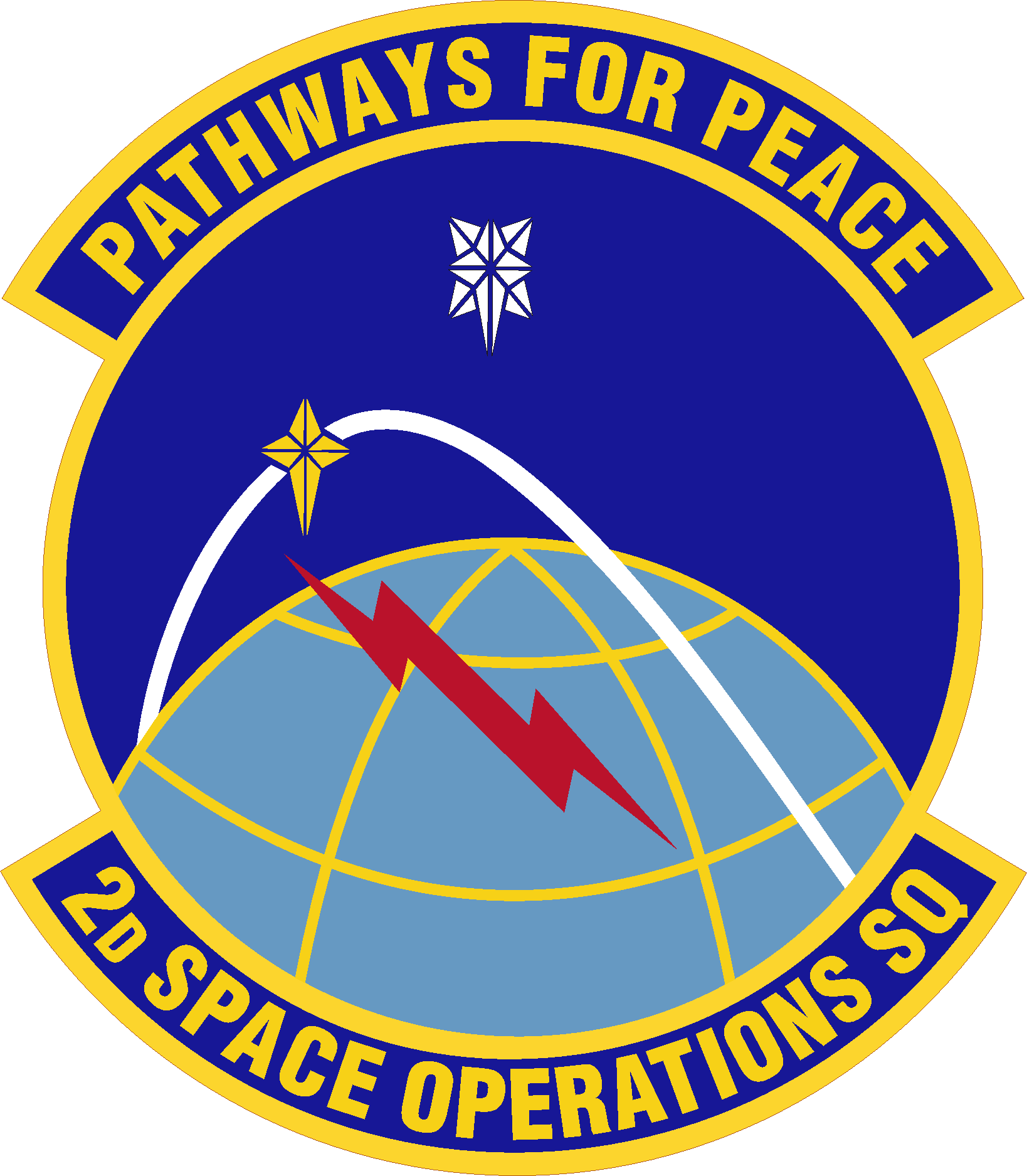
- Former 2nd Space Operations Squadron emblem

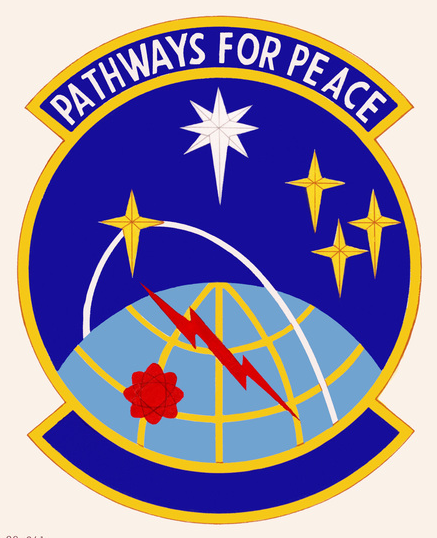
- 2d Satellite Control Squadron emblem (approved 6 May 1988)

The 2nd Navigation Warfare Squadron (2 NWS) is a United States Space Force unit responsible for operating the Global Positioning System (GPS) satellite constellation, which provides global navigation, time transfer, and nuclear detonation detection. It is a component of Space Operations Command's Mission Delta 31 and headquartered at Schriever Space Force Base, Colorado.

The squadron is augmented by reserve personnel from the 19th Space Operations Squadron, part of the 310th Space Wing.

== Mission ==
The squadron performs the command and control mission for the Global Positioning System satellite constellation. GPS is the U.S. space-based position, velocity and timing system, capable of providing Precision Navigation and Timing capability simultaneously to an unlimited number of properly equipped users. Continuous GPS availability and unprecedented signal accuracy has resulted in widespread integration of the technology; numerous military, commercial and international users have embraced GPS.

== History ==
The squadron was originally constituted as the 2d Surveillance Squadron and activated on 16 January 1962 under North American Air Defense Command. It was then organized on 1 February 1962 at Ent Air Force Base under the 9th Aerospace Defense Division, under which it operated SPACETRACK, the USAF globe-spanning space surveillance network, from 1962 through 1967. The squadron was inactivated on 1 January 1967.

It was redesignated the 2d Satellite Control Squadron as the first operational squadron of the 2d Space Wing. It was activated at Falcon Air Force Station on 1 October 1985.

The squadron has controlled the NAVSTAR Global Positioning System satellite constellation and managed the Nuclear Detonation System in support of the Nuclear Test Ban Treaty since 1987.

On 30 January 1992, as part of an Air Force reorganization, 2 SCS was redesignated the 2d Space Operations Squadron.

On June 18, 2004, a 24/7 user focal point, the GPSOC, was established.

In late 2005, several National Geospatial-Intelligence Agency monitor stations were integrated into the network to improve navigation accuracy and signal monitoring.

The unit had one geographically separated unit, Detachment 1, at Cape Canaveral Air Force Station, Florida. It was responsible for maintenance of a GPS Ground Antenna, Monitor Station, and various operational test assets. It is now discontinued, though contractors remained to perform the mission.

On 15 October 2024, 2 SOPS was redesignated as the 2nd Navigation Warfare Squadron when the PNT Delta (Provisional) was redesignated as Mission Delta 31.

== Lineage ==
- Constituted as the 2d Surveillance Squadron (Sensor) and activated, on 16 January 1962 (not organized)

Organized on 1 February 1962
Discontinued and inactivated on 1 January 1967

- Redesignated 2d Satellite Control Squadron on 16 Jul 1985

Activated on 1 October 1985
Redesignated 2d Space Operations Squadron on 30 Jan 1992

=== Assignments ===
- Air Defense Command, 16 January 1962 (not organized)
- 9th Aerospace Defense Division, 1 February 1962 – 1 January 1967
- 2d Space Wing, 1 October 1985 – 30 January 1992
- 50th Operations Group, 30 January 1992 – 24 July 2020
- Space Delta 8, July 2020 – 13 October 2023
- Positioning, Navigation, and Timing Integrated Mission Delta (Provisional), 13 October 2023 – present

=== Stations ===
- Ent Air Force Base, Colorado, 1 February 1962 – 1 January 1967
- Falcon Air Force Station (later Falcon Air Force Base, Schriever Space Force Base), Colorado, 1 October 1985 – present

=== Decorations ===
Air Force Outstanding Unit Award

- 1 June 1964 – 31 May 1966
- 1 December 1987 – 30 November 1989
- 1 September 1990 – 31 August 1991

== List of commanders ==
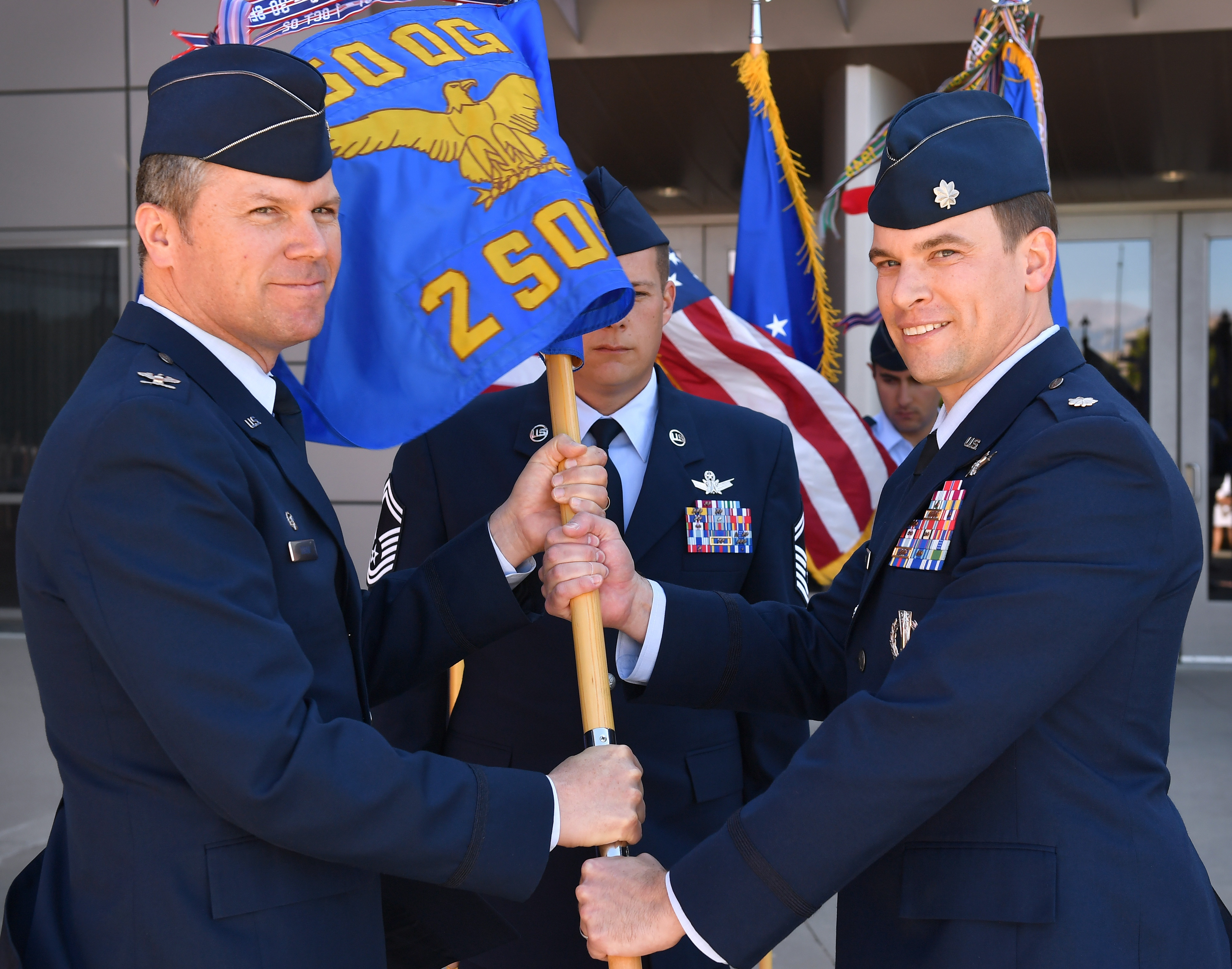
Squadron change of command June 1, 2018

- Lt Col Steven C. Stadler, October 1985 – April 1988
- Lt Col Barry R. Springer, April 1988 – April 1989
- Lt Col Michael E. Shaw, April 1989 – August 1990
- Lt Col William L. Shelton, August 1990 – June 1992
- Lt Col Harrison C. Freer, June 1992 – June 1994
- Lt Col Frank M. DeArmond, June 1994 – January 1995
- Maj Thomas A. Shircliff, January 1995 – March 1995
- Lt Col Roger C. Hunter, March 1995 – October 1996
- Lt Col Joseph P. Squatrito, October 1996 – July 1998
- Lt Col James K. McLaughlin, July 1998 – June 2000
- Lt Col Daniel P. Jordan, June 2000 – July 2002
- Lt Col Scott A. Henderson, July 2002 – July 2004
- Lt Col Stephen T. Hamilton, July 2004 – uly 2006
- Lt Col Kurt W. Kuntzleman, July 2006 – August 2008
- Lt Col DeAnna M. Burt, August 2008 – August 2010
- Lt Col Jennifer L. Grant, August 2010 – June 2012
- Lt Col Thomas Ste. Marie, June 2012 – July 2014
- Lt Col Todd Benson, July 2014 – June 2016
- Lt Col Peter C. Norsky, June 2016 – 1 June 2018
- Lt Col Stephen A. Toth, 1 June 2018 – June 2020
- Lt Col Michael K. Schriever, June 2020 – 6 July 2022
- Lt Col Robert O. Wray, 6 July 2022 – 21 June 2024
- Lt Col Jeremy Parr, 21 June 2024 - present

== See also ==
- 19th Space Operations Squadron
