= DeAnna Burt =

U.S. Space Force general (born 1969)

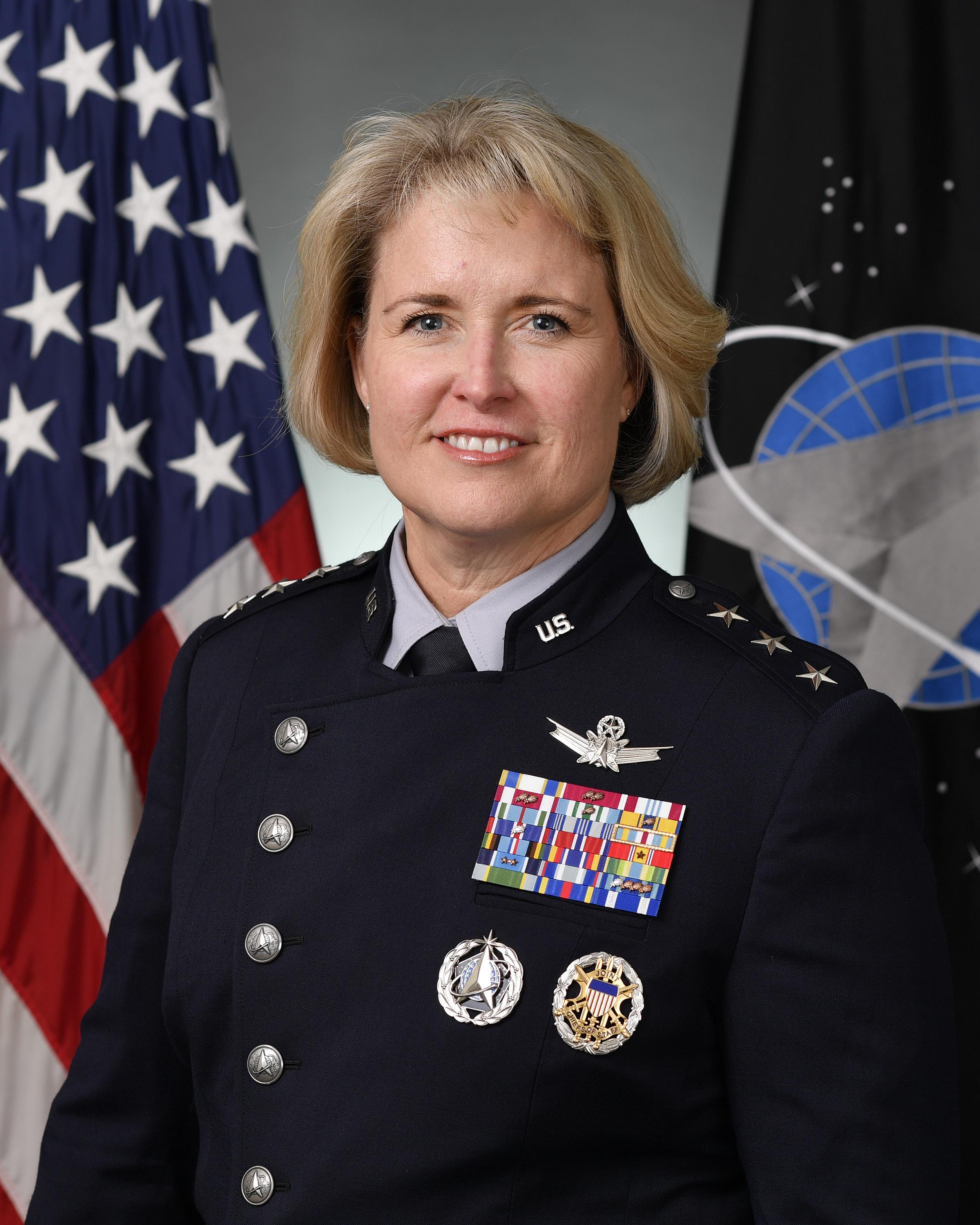
- Official portrait, 2023
- Born: DeAnna Marie Burt; 15 February 1969 (age 57); Louisville, Kentucky, U.S.
- Education: Embry–Riddle Aeronautical University (BS): Troy State University (MS)
- Spouse: David Morrow
- Military career
- Allegiance: United States
- Branch: United States Air Force: United States Space Force
- Service years: 1992–2021 (Air Force): 2021–2025 (Space Force)
- Rank: Lieutenant General
- Nickname: Spice
- Commands: Combined Force Space Component Command: 50th Space Wing; 460th Operations Group; 2nd Space Operations Squadron
- Awards: Air Force Distinguished Service Medal (2): Legion of Merit (3)

DeAnna Marie Burt (born 15 February 1969) is a retired United States Space Force lieutenant general who has served as the deputy chief of space operations for operations, cyber, and nuclear from 2022 to 2025. She is the first female major general and second female general officer in the Space Force.

Burt entered the United States Air Force in 1992 after graduating from the Embry-Riddle Aeronautical University. She is a career space operations officer with numerous satellite operations and staff positions in Air Force Space Command and United States European Command. She has commanded the 2nd Space Operations Squadron, 460th Operations Group, and 50th Space Wing. She is a graduate and former instructor of the USAF Weapons School and a graduate of the School of Advanced Air and Space Studies. She also served as the vice commander of the United States Air Force Warfare Center.

In 2021, Burt transferred to the Space Force, where she now serves as its chief operations officer, responsible for operations, sustainment, cyber, and nuclear operations. She served as the commander of the Combined Force Space Component Command and vice commander of Space Operations Command from 2020 to 2022.

== Early life and education ==
Burt was born on 15 February 1969, in Louisville, Kentucky. When she was six years old, her family moved to Jacksonville, Florida.

Burt entered Air Force Reserve Officer Training Corps (AFROTC) at the Embry-Riddle Aeronautical University to get a college scholarship. She initially planned to just work in the Air Force for four years. At Embry-Riddle, she was the AFROTC cadet wing commander and chairman of the Women's Programming Board. She was also involved as Head Resident Advisor and Campus Climate for Women. In 1991, she received a B.S. degree in aeronautical engineering as a distinguished graduate. In 1995, she received an M.S. degree in human resources management from Troy State University in Alabama.

As part of her professional military education, Burt attended Squadron Officer School, USAF Weapons School, Air Command and Staff College, School of Advanced Air and Space Studies, National War College, and Air University. She also attended several leadership courses and seminars from the Center for Creative Leadership, UNC Kenan–Flagler Business School, Alan Freed Associates, and Arlie Center.

== Military career ==
=== Air Force ===
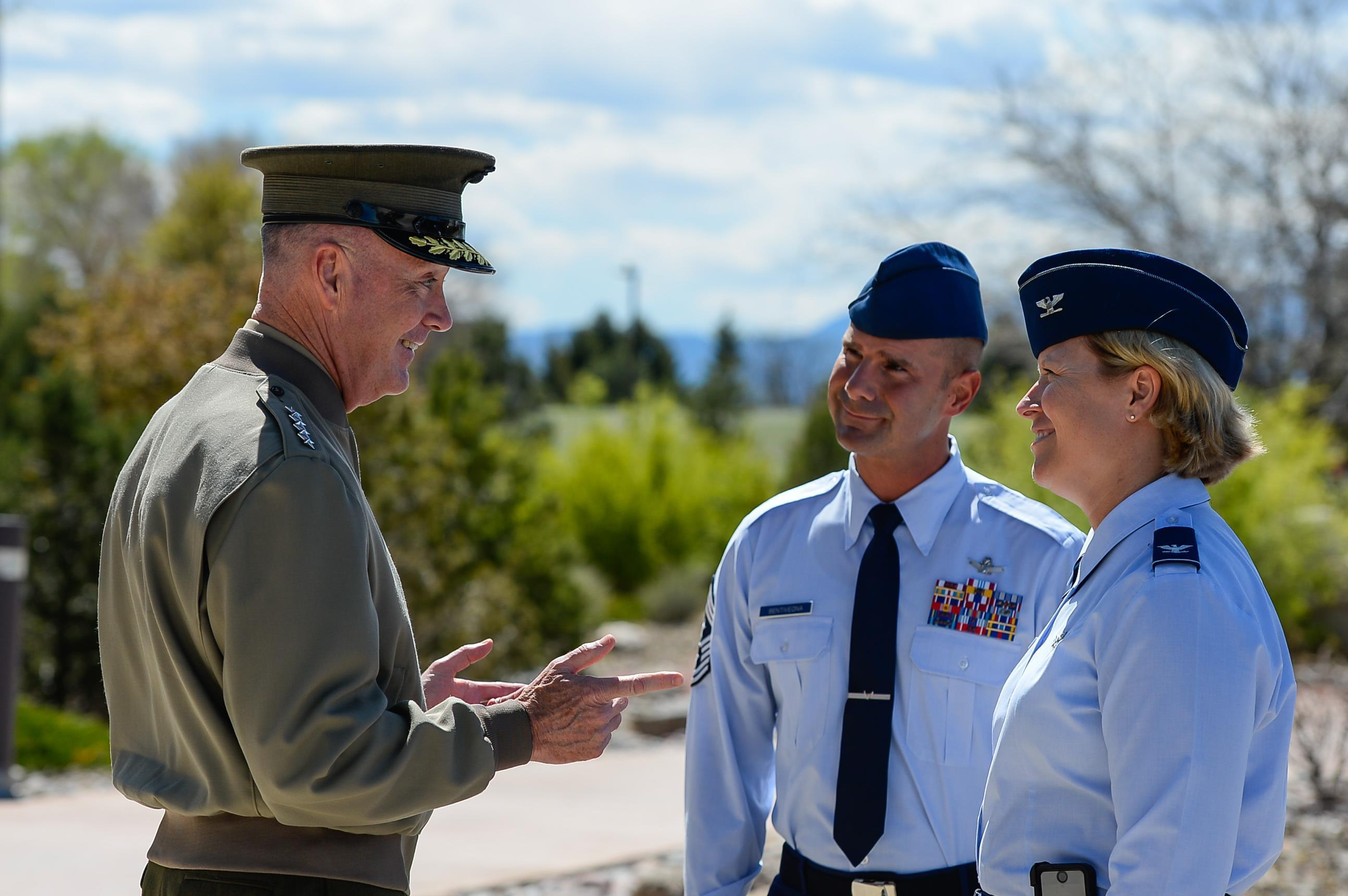
Burt and CMSgt Bentivegna speak to Gen Dunford during his visit to Schriever Air Force Base, 2016

Burt was nominated into the Air Force on 13 May 1992, a year after graduating from the Embry-Riddle Aeronautical University through an Air Force Reserve Officer Training Corps scholarship. She originally intended to serve for four years in the Air Force, the minimum service requirement to pay off the scholarship. After getting her commission, she underwent a three-month undergraduate space training at Lowry Air Force Base, Colorado.

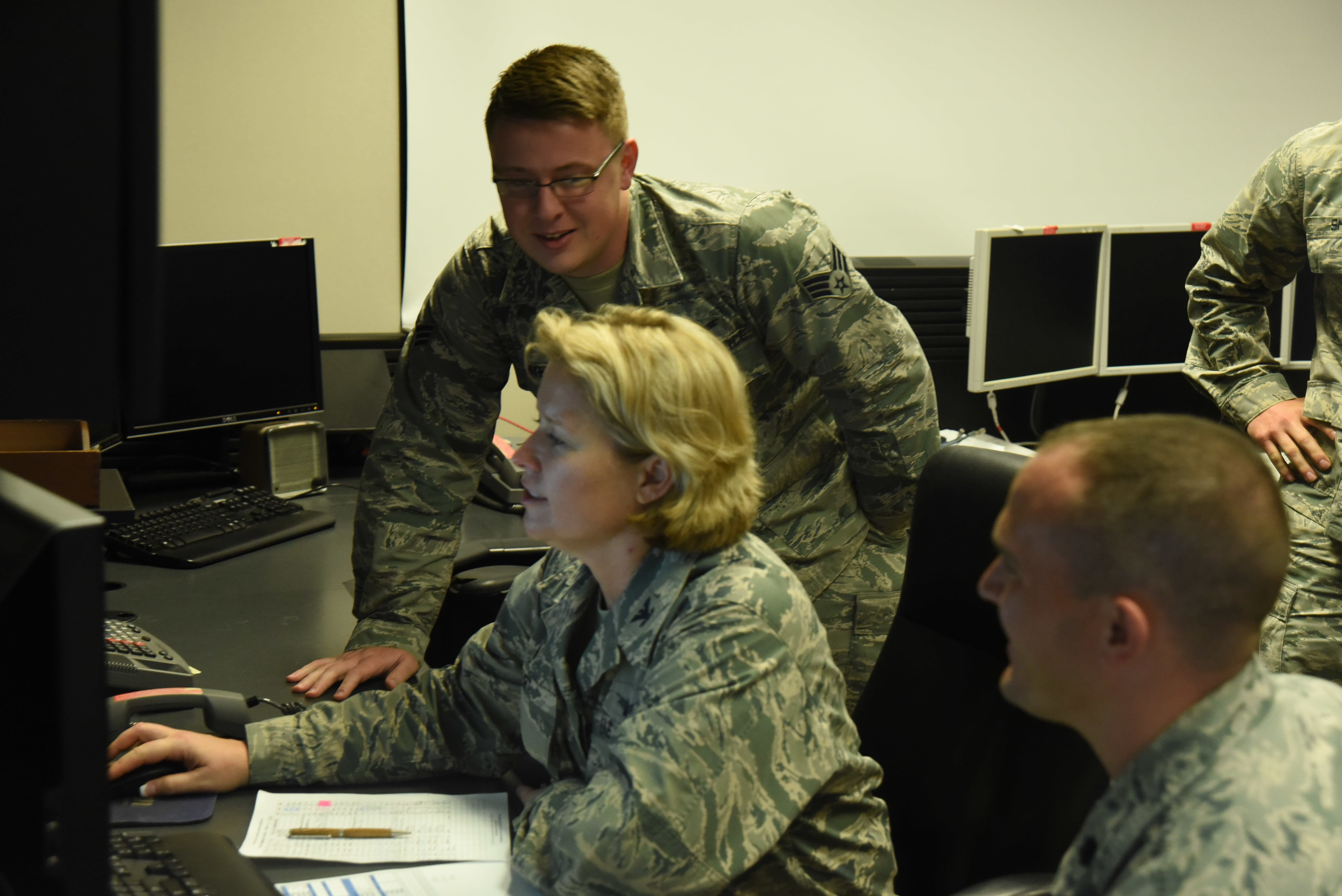
Burt (center) final command to decommission a satellite, 2017

From 1993 to 1995, Burt was assigned with the 4th Space Warning Squadron at Holloman Air Force Base, New Mexico, as crew commander, deputy flight commander, and chief of current operations. She was then assigned to the 76th Space Operations Squadron at Schriever Air Force Base, Colorado, from 1995 to 1997 as chief of space systems tactical warning operations and chief of standardization and training. After that, she served as an executive officer at the Space Warfare Center until 1999.

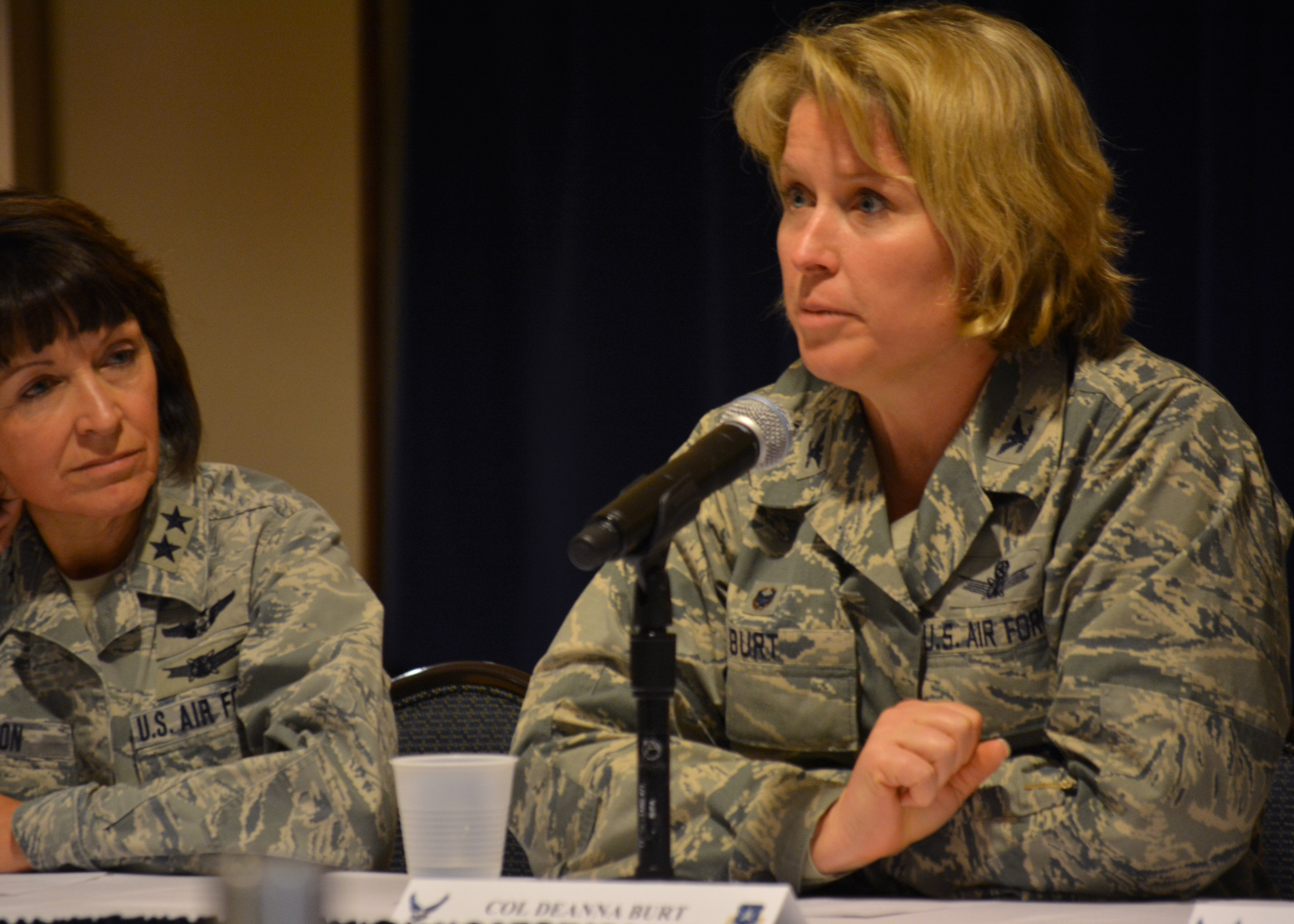
Burt (right) speaks to attendees of the Women's Leadership Symposium, 2017

After attending Weapons School, Burt served for two years there as an instructor, assistant training flight commander, and training flight commander. From 2001 to 2004, she was assigned to Patch Barracks in Stuttgart, Germany, as a theater missile defense operations officer and the deputy chief of Special Technical Operations Branch of the United States European Command.

Burt then went back to the United States, studying for two years at the Air Command and Staff College and the School of Advanced Air and Space Studies at Maxwell Air Force Base, Alabama. From 2006 to 2008, she was assigned at Vandenberg Air Force Base, California, where she served as chief of the Combat Plans Division at the Joint Space Operations Center. During this time, he worked with then-Lieutenant Colonel B. Chance Saltzman during the 2007 Chinese anti-satellite missile test.

In August 2008, Burt took command of the 2nd Space Operations Squadron (2 SOPS) at Schriever, operating the Global Positioning System. She served as commander of 2 SOPS for two years, after which she was assigned to Peterson Air Force Base in Colorado as chief of the Positioning, Navigation, and Timing Requirements Division of the Air Force Space Command (AFSPC).

From 2012 to 2014, Burt served as commander of the 460th Operations Group at Buckley Air Force Base, Colorado, overseeing missile warning units. After her second command tour, she was reassigned back to AFSPC as director of the commander's action group for a year. After that, she took command of the 50th Space Wing at Schriever, serving from 2015 to 2017.

Selected for promotion to brigadier general, Burt moved to the United States Air Force Warfare Center at Nellis Air Force Base, Nevada, as vice commander. In 2018, she returned to AFSPC as director of operations and communications.

=== Space Force ===
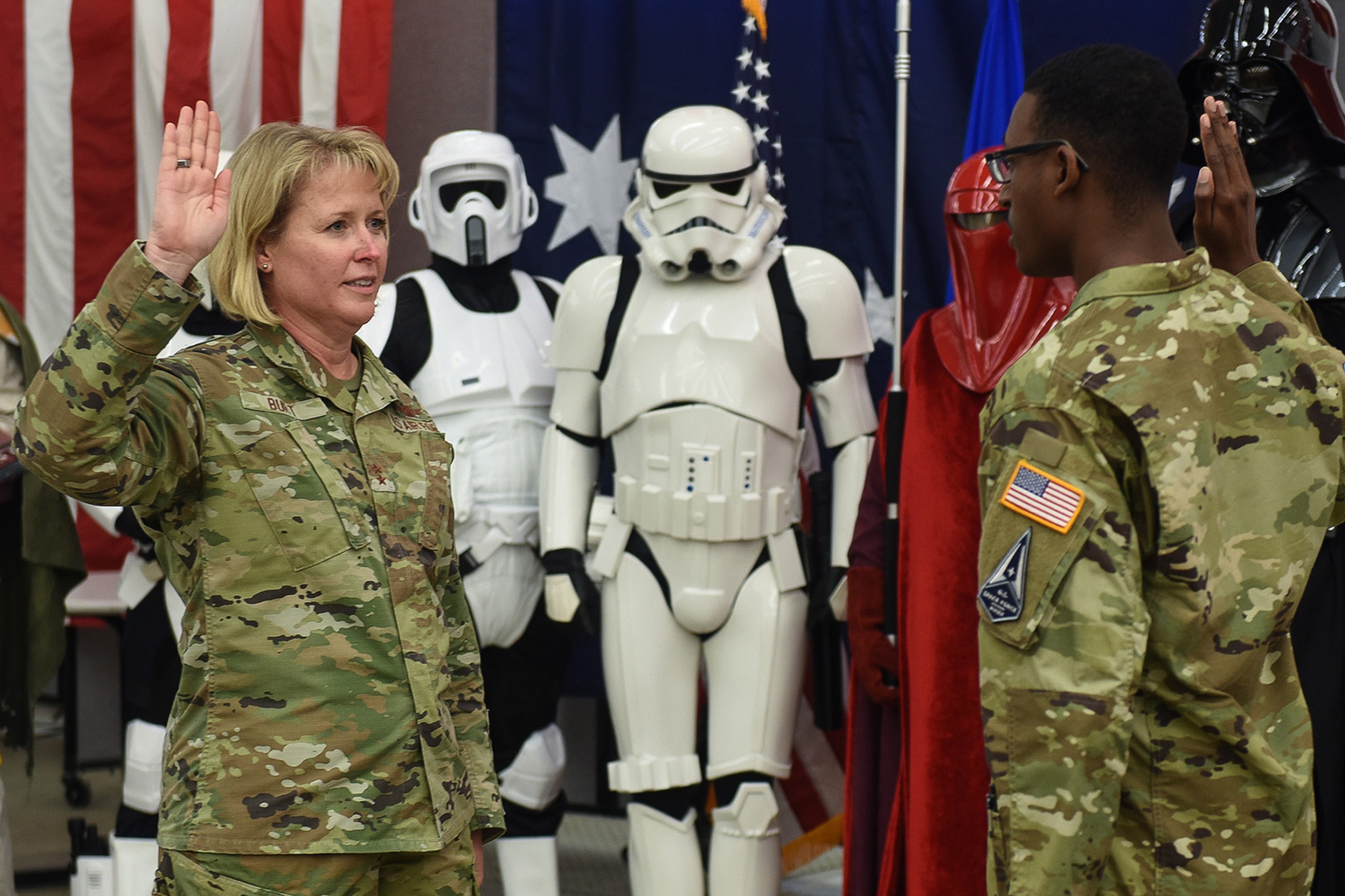
Burt gets sworn in as she transfers to the Space Force, 7 May 2021

On 20 December 2019, the United States Space Force was established. AFSPC was redesignated as Headquarters, United States Space Force, and temporarily served as headquarter functions for the new service. As such, Burt performed her tasks as director of operations and communications temporarily for the service until Headquarters, United States Space Force, was redesignated as Space Operations Command (SpOC) in October 2020. She continued to serve the same position for SpOC, during which time she was promoted to major general.

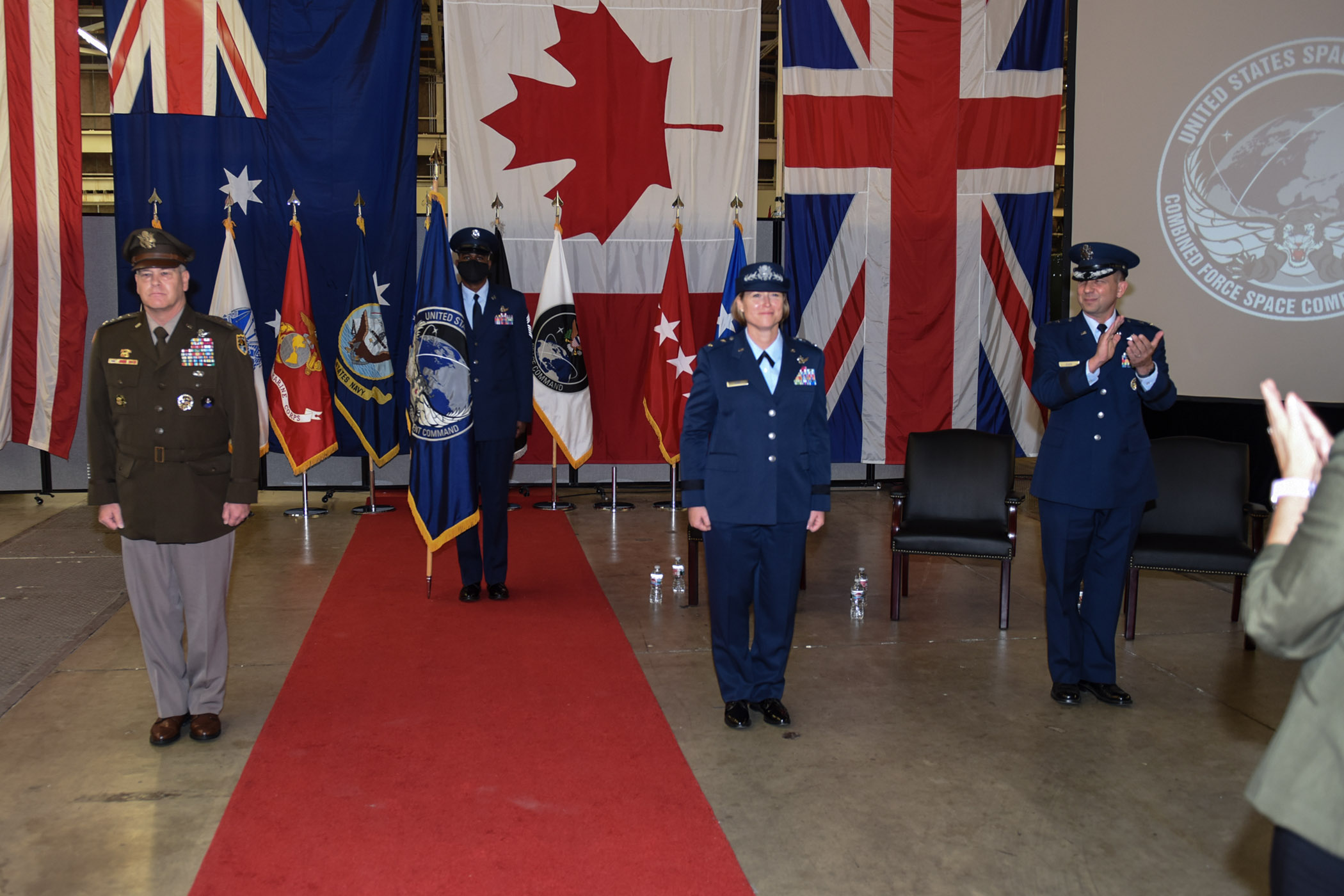
Burt (center) stands at attention with Gen Dickinson and Maj Gen Shaw after taking command of the Combined Force Space Component Command in 2020

In November 2023, took command of the Combined Force Space Component Command (CFSCC) at Vandenberg from then-Major General John E. Shaw, who was confirmed to serve as deputy commander of the United States Space Command. Additionally, she served as vice commander of Space Operations Command. Burt transferred to the Space Force on 7 May 2021, becoming the first woman to hold this rank in the Space Force. She is also the second general officer in the Space Force, after Lieutenant General Nina Armagno. In August 2022, she relinquished command of CFSCC to Major General Douglas Schiess.

In October 2022, Burt was nominated for promotion to lieutenant general and assignment as deputy chief of space operations for operations, cyber, and nuclear. She would replace Saltzman who was confirmed to serve as the second chief of space operations. While awaiting confirmation, she temporarily served as special assistant to the vice chief of space operations. She was confirmed on 30 November 2022. A day later, she was promoted to lieutenant general and assumed the post as the second deputy chief of space operations for operations, cyber, and nuclear. As the chief operating officer of the Space Force, she has overall responsibility for operations, sustainment, cyber, and nuclear Operations service.

In June 2023, Burt criticized "anti-LGBTQ+" state laws that prevent the Space Force from assigning the most qualified candidates for assignments.

== Personal life ==
Burt is married to a retired Air Force Colonel.

== Awards and decorations ==
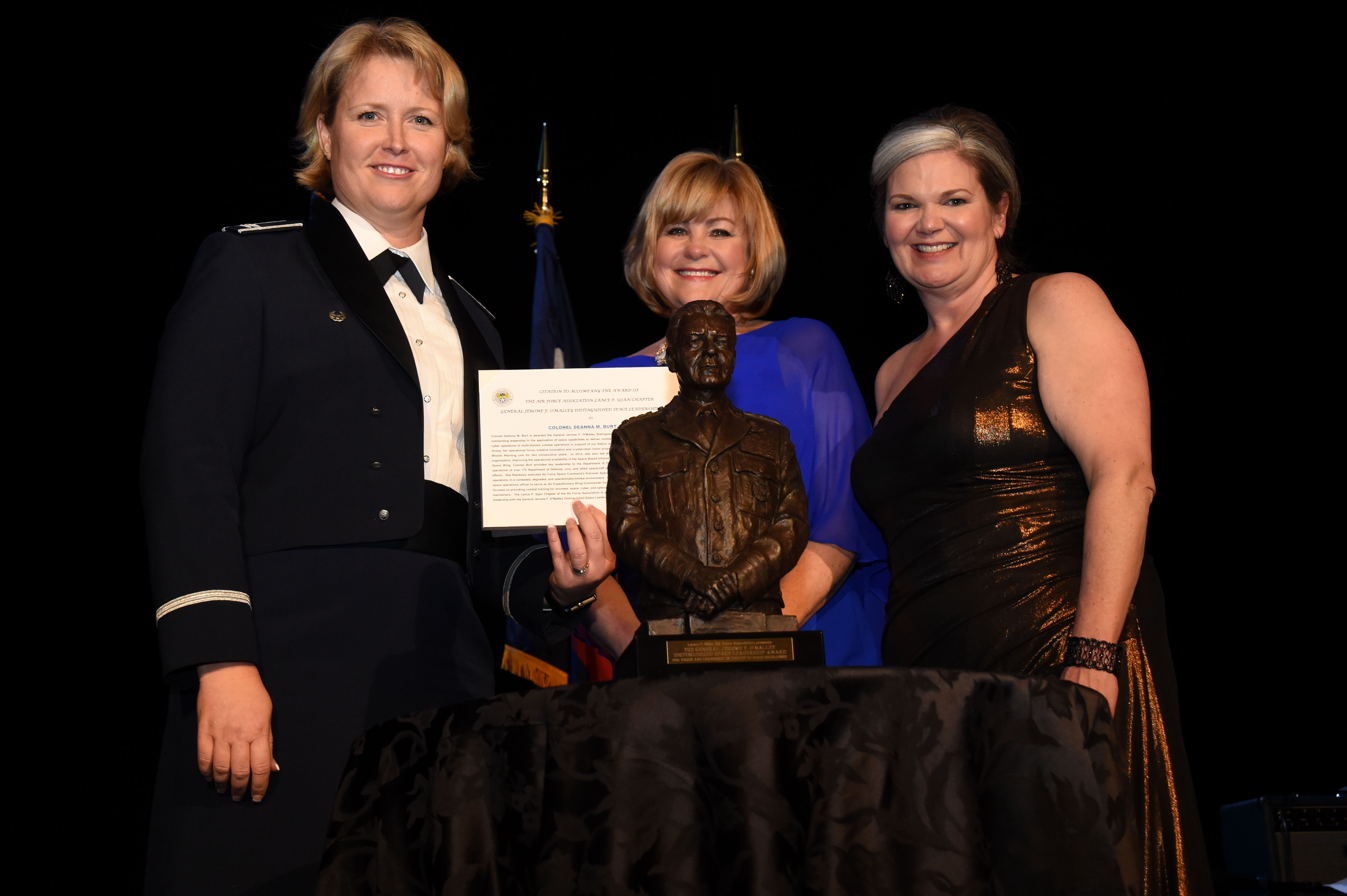
Burt receives the Gen Jerome F. O'Malley Distinguished Space Leadership Award from the Air Force Association in 2017

Burt is the recipient of the following awards:

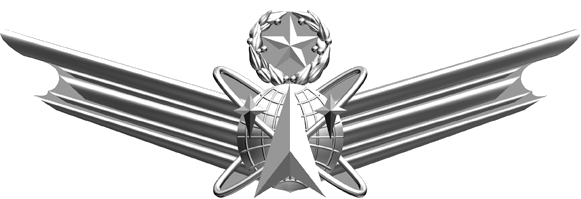
Command Space Operations Badge

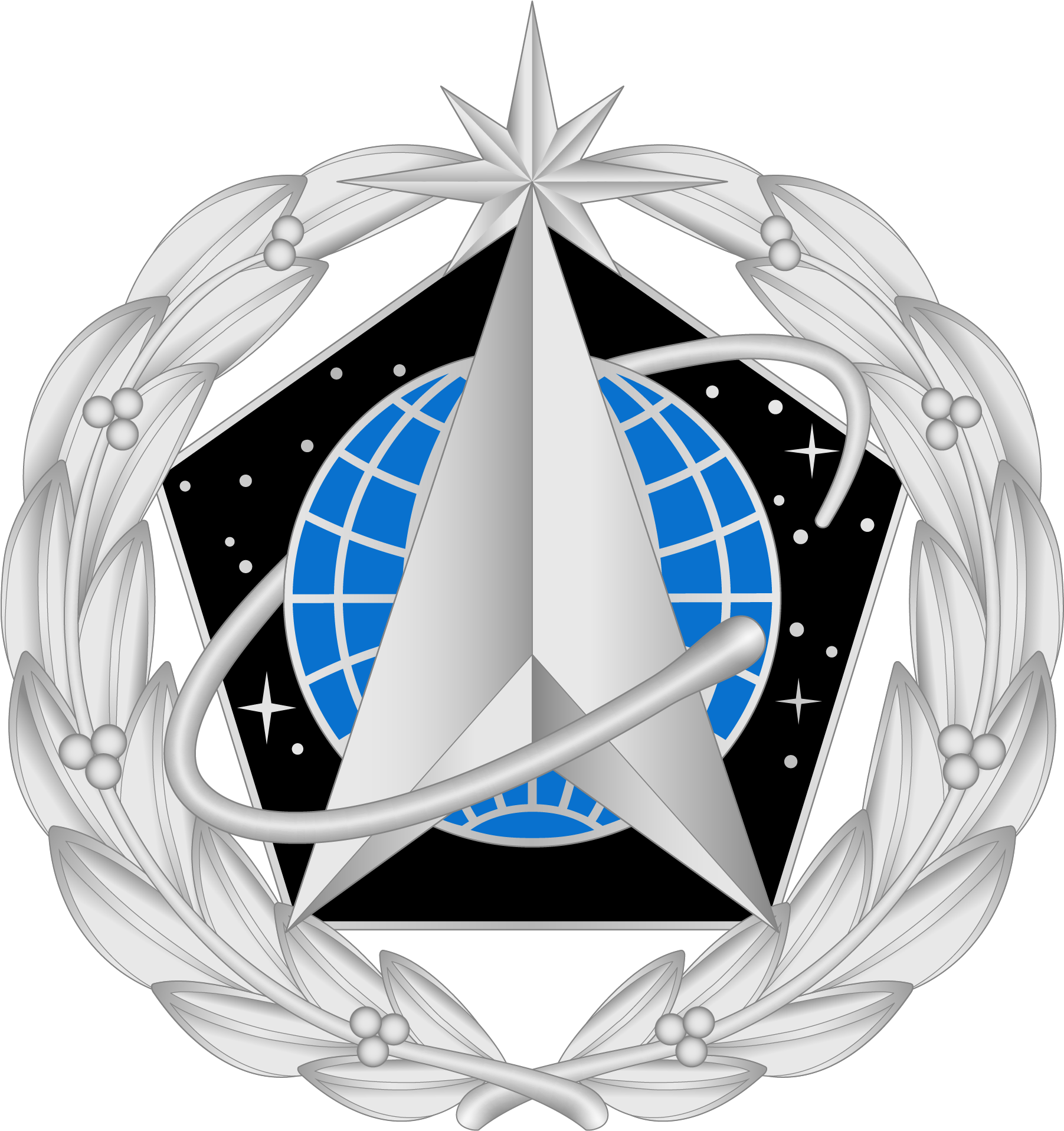

Space Staff Badge

Office of the Joint Chiefs of Staff Identification Badge

Air Force Distinguished Service Medal with one bronze oak leaf cluster
Legion of Merit with two bronze oak leaf clusters
Defense Meritorious Service Medal
Meritorious Service Medal with two bronze oak leaf clusters
Joint Service Commendation Medal with one bronze oak leaf cluster
Air Force Commendation Medal with one bronze oak leaf cluster
Joint Service Achievement Medal
Air Force Achievement Medal
Joint Meritorious Unit Award
Air Force Outstanding Unit Award with one silver oak leaf cluster
Air Force Organizational Excellence Award
National Defense Service Medal with one bronze service star
Armed Forces Expeditionary Medal
Global War on Terrorism Service Medal
Armed Forces Service Medal
Remote Combat Effects Campaign Medal with two bronze service stars
Air and Space Campaign Medal
Air Force Longevity Service Award with one silver and three bronze oak leaf clusters
Small Arms Expert Marksmanship Ribbon
Air Force Training Ribbon
NATO Medal (Yugoslavia)

== Dates of promotion ==
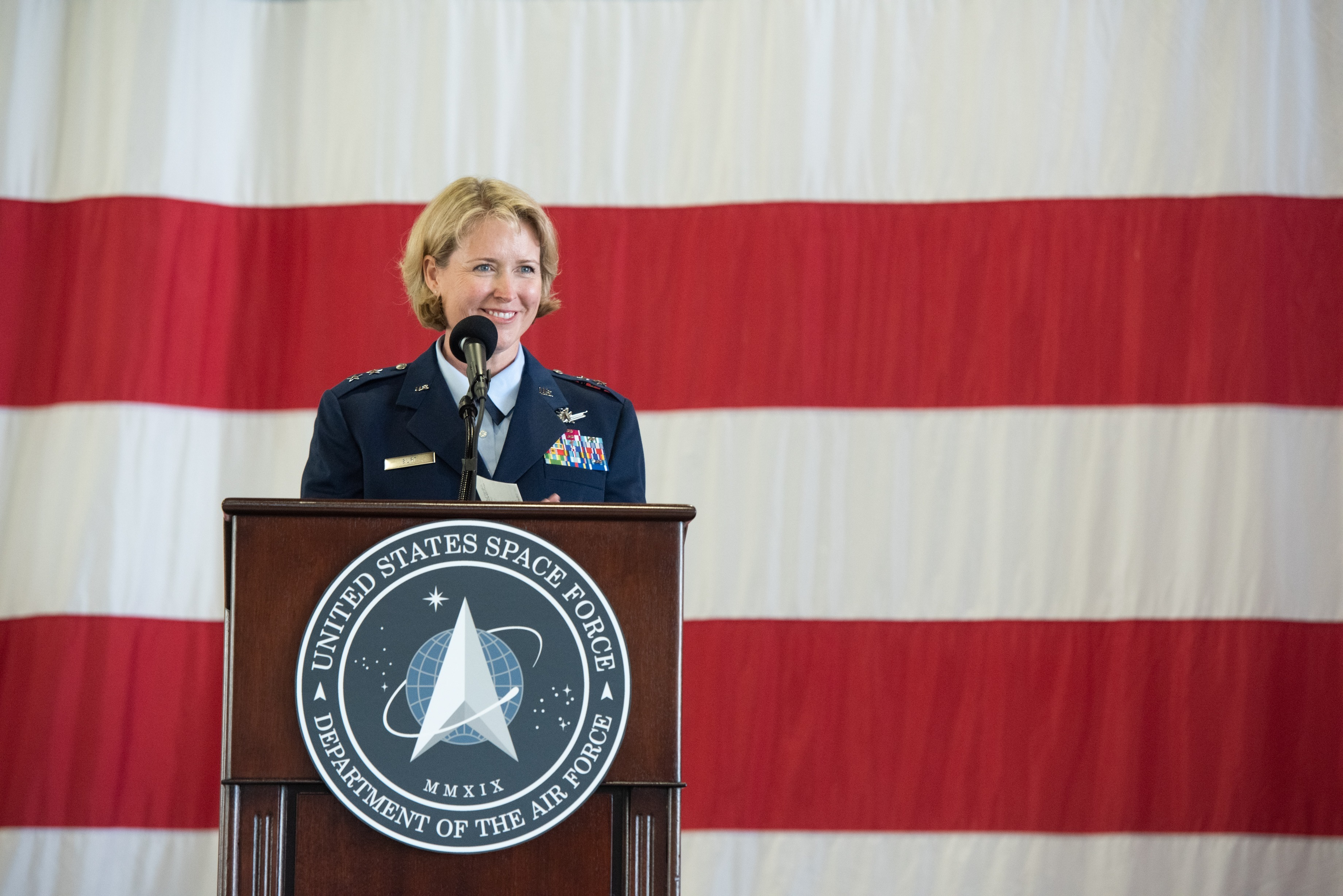
Burt addresses the audience during her promotion ceremony to major general, 2020

Rank	Branch	Date
Second Lieutenant	Air Force	13 May 1992
First Lieutenant	Air Force	13 May 1994
Captain	Air Force	13 May 1996
Major	Air Force	1 November 2002
Lieutenant Colonel	Air Force	1 August 2007
Colonel	Air Force	1 September 2011
Brigadier General	Air Force	2 September 2017
Major General	Air Force	2 August 2020
Major General	Space Force	7 May 2021
Lieutenant General	Space Force	1 December 2022

Military offices
Preceded by Kurt W. Kuntzleman	Commander of the 2nd Space Operations Squadron; 2008–2010	Succeeded by Jennifer L. Grant
Preceded by B. Chance Saltzman	Commander of the 460th Operations Group; 2012–2014	Succeeded by Michael Jackson
Preceded by William Liquori	Commander of the 50th Space Wing; 2015–2017	Succeeded by Jennifer L. Grant
Preceded by Paul A. Welch	Vice Commander of the United States Air Force Warfare Center; 2017–2018	Succeeded by David W. Snoddy
Preceded by Joseph T. Guastella	Director of Operations and Communications of Space Operations Command; 2018–2020	Succeeded by Douglas Schiess
Preceded by John E. Shaw	Commander of the Combined Force Space Component Command and Vice Commander of Space Operations Command; 2020–2022	Succeeded by Douglas Schiess
Preceded by B. Chance Saltzman	Deputy Chief of Space Operations for Operations, Cyber, and Nuclear; 2022–2025	Succeeded by Douglas Schiess
