= George Shelton (actor) =

American actor

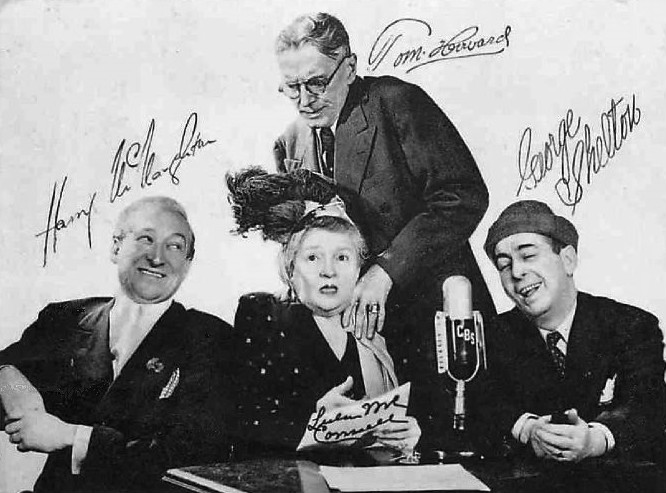
Cast of It Pays to Be Ignorant, George Shelton on right

George Shelton (March 4, 1884 - April 24, 1971) was an actor who did vaudeville shows, appeared in American comedy films, and was on the radio show It Pays to be Ignorant. He appeared in about 40 films between 1933 and 1947.

He performed with Tom Howard. WNYC has a photo on its website of Shelton and fellow It Pays to Be Ignorant radio personalities Tom Howard, Harry McNaughton, and Lulu McConnell captioned as reading the newspaper comics by invitation of New York City Fiorello La Guardia during a 17-day newspaper strike, but the accompanying audio is a woman recounting her travels to the U.S.S.R.

In 1961 he interviewed Maurice Barrett about Bobby Clark.

He was a hoofer.

== Filmography ==
- How Am I Doing! (1935)
- Tranatlantic Love (1936), as Charlie Dalton
- Meet the Bride (1937)
- That's the Spirit (1937)
- The House on 92nd Street (1945)
- Kiss of Death (1947)

(Tom) Howard & Shelton comedy shorts:

- Two A.M. (1931)
- Breaking Even (1932)
- The Vest with a Tale (1932)
- The Acid Test (1932)
- Aces Wild (1932)
- Static (1933)
- Divorce Sweets (1933)
- The Big Meow (1934)
- The Wrong Bottle (1934)
- Second Hand Husband (1934)
- An Ear for Music (1935)
- Grooms in Gloom (1935)
- Time Out (1935)
- The Magic Word (1935)
- Stylish Stouts (1935)
- He's a Prince (1935)
- Where Is Wall Street (1936)
- Rail Birds (1936)
