= Eagle Manufacturing Company =

Defunct farm equipment company in Appleton, Wisconsin

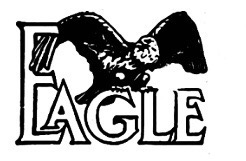
- Founded: 1906; 120 years ago
- Defunct: 1941; 85 years ago
- Headquarters: Appleton, Wisconsin
- Products: Tractors

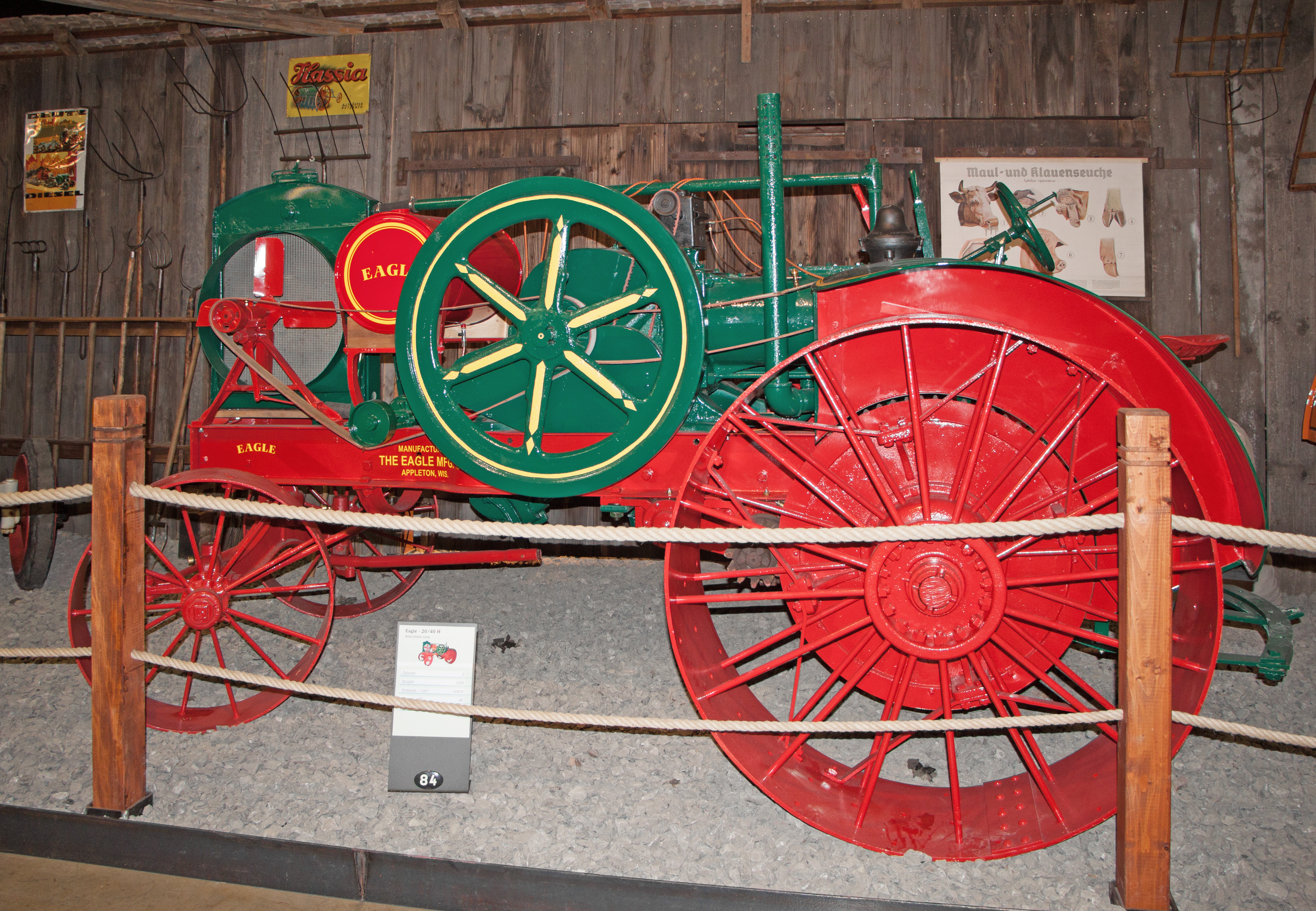
Eagle 20-40 H (1928)

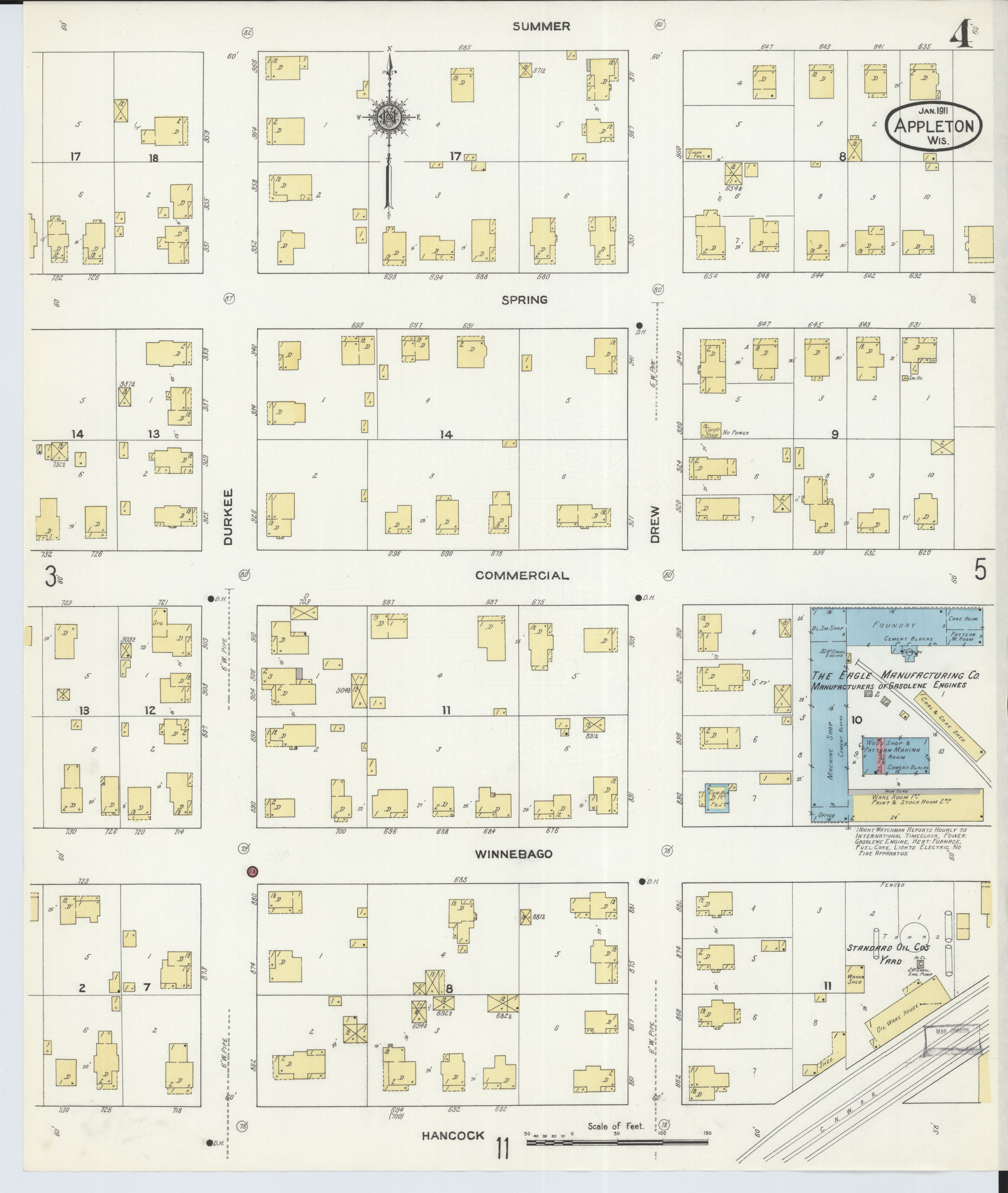
Eagle Manufacturing Company plant (1911)

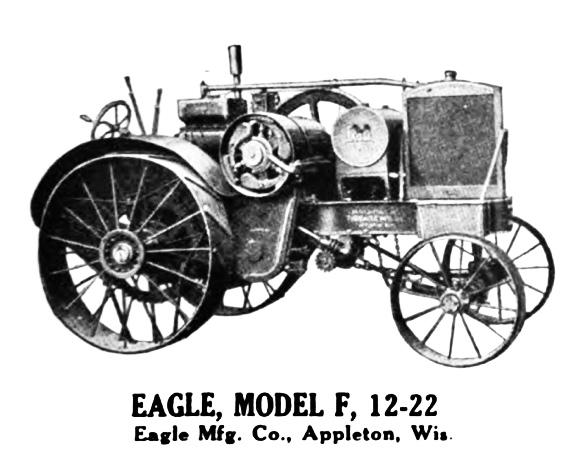
Eagle Model F 12-22 (1920)

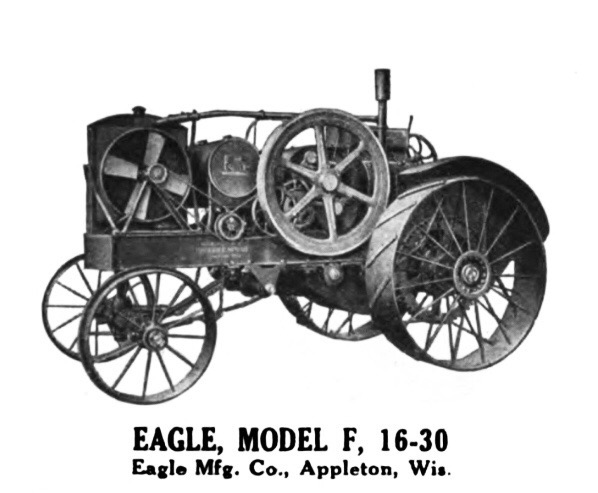
Eagle Model F 16-30 (1920)

The Eagle Manufacturing Company of Appleton, Wisconsin, United States, first entered the farm equipment market in 1906 with a 32-horsepower (24 kW) tractor. In 1899 the company was located at 671 Superior St in Appleton Wisconsin. In 1904 it built a production facility designed by architect Wallace W. De Long. It returned to the marketplace several years later, in 1929 offering a 20-35 Model E. Based on a two-cylinder traction engine design, the engine measured 8.00x9.00 inches in bore and stroke. A truly massive affair, it was rated at 20 drawbar horsepower and 35 belt-pulley horsepower. Eagle also built its Model H alongside the Model E from 1926 to 1930. With an identical 8.00-inch (203 mm) bore to the Model E, but a 1.00-inch (25 mm) longer stroke at 10.00 inches, the Model H created a brawny 40 horsepower (30 kW) at the drawbar. Eagle was one of the first tractor manufacturers to use a 6-cylinder engine. It switched from 2 cylinders to 6 cylinders in 1930. Eagle built tractors from 1906, but halted production during World War II never to start its assembly lines again.

== Products ==
- 6A
- E 20-35
- H 16-30
- H 20-40
- H 22-45
