= William L. Shelton =

US Air Force general

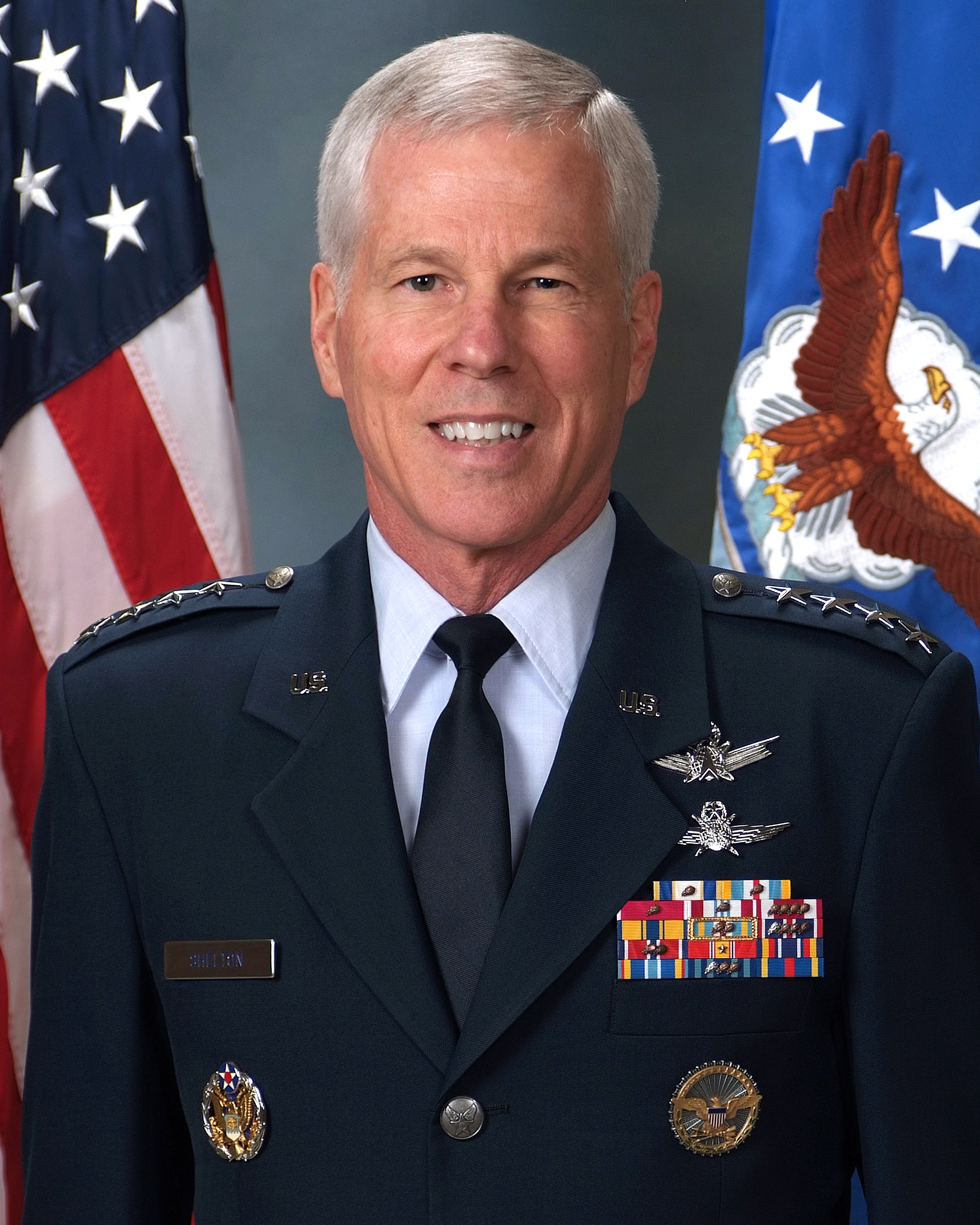
- General William L. Shelton, USAF; Commander, Air Force Space Command
- Born: February 25, 1954 (age 72); Tulsa, Oklahoma, U.S.
- Military career
- Allegiance: United States of America
- Branch: United States Air Force
- Service years: 1976–2014
- Rank: General
- Units: various USAF, DoD Joint
- Commands: 14th Air Force; Joint Functional Component Command for Space; Air Force Space Command
- Awards: Air Force Distinguished Service Medal (3); Defense Superior Service Medal (2); Legion of Merit (2)

William Lee Shelton (born February 25, 1954) is a former United States Air Force four-star general who last served as the commander of Air Force Space Command from January 5, 2011, to August 15, 2014. He had been the Assistant Vice Chief of Staff of the United States Air Force and Air Staff Director. He had served as chief of warfighting integration and chief information officer, Office of the Secretary of the Air Force. Shelton held numerous positions of leadership throughout the United States Air Force. He retired from the Air Force on September 1, 2014.

== Biography ==
=== Background and education ===
Shelton graduated from the United States Air Force Academy in Colorado Springs, Colorado, in 1976 with a Bachelor of Science in astronautical engineering. He earned a Master of Science degree in astronautical engineering in 1980 from the Air Force Institute of Technology.

=== US Air Force officer career ===
Upon graduation, Shelton was commissioned as a second lieutenant on June 2, 1976. His first assignment was as a launch facilities manager, launch director and technical assistant to the commander from August 1976 to May 1979 at the Space and Missile Test Center, Vandenberg AFB in California. While at Vandenberg, he was promoted to first lieutenant on June 2, 1978. Following his first assignment, Shelton reported to the US Air Force Institute of Technology at Wright-Patterson AFB, Ohio. He graduated with a Master of Science in astronautical engineering in December 1980.

After graduation, Shelton was assigned to the Johnson Space Center in Houston, Texas, where he worked as a space shuttle flight controller until July 1985. While in Texas he was promoted to the rank of captain on June 2, 1980, and to the rank of major on May 1, 1985. In July 1985, Shelton moved on to the Armed Forces Staff College in Norfolk, Virginia. Following staff college, he was assigned to work for the deputy chief of staff for operations at Air Force Space Command on Peterson AFB in Colorado Springs, Colorado. He moved on from Colorado Springs in August 1988 to Washington, D.C., to work for the Secretary of the Air Force in the office of Space Plans and Policy. Promoted to lieutenant colonel on March 1, 1990, he took command of the 2d Space Operations Squadron at Falcon AFB in Colorado in August of the same year.

After his first command tour, Shelton served as executive officer to the vice commander, Air Force Space Command, for a year beginning in June 1992. He moved on to assume command of the 50th Operations Group at Falcon AFB from June 1993 to July 1994. While in command he was promoted to colonel on February 1, 1994. Following his second command tour, Shelton returned to school at the National War College at Fort Lesley J. McNair in Washington, D.C. There he earned a Master of Science in national security strategy, graduating in May 1995.

Following his War College tour, Shelton served as the deputy program manager and executive assistant for the Cooperative Threat Reduction Program Office, which fell under the Office of the Assistant to the Secretary of Defense for Nuclear, Chemical, and Biological Defense Programs in Washington, D.C. In 1996, he attended the Program for Senior Officials in National Security at Syracuse University and Johns Hopkins University. In September 1997 he assumed command of the 90th Space Wing at Francis E. Warren AFB in Wyoming. From September 1999 to July 2000 he was again in Washington, D.C., this time as the chief of the Space Superiority Division in the Office of the deputy chief of staff for plans and programs. He followed this assignment by serving from July 2000 to November 2000 as director of manpower and organization in the same office.

=== Flag assignments ===
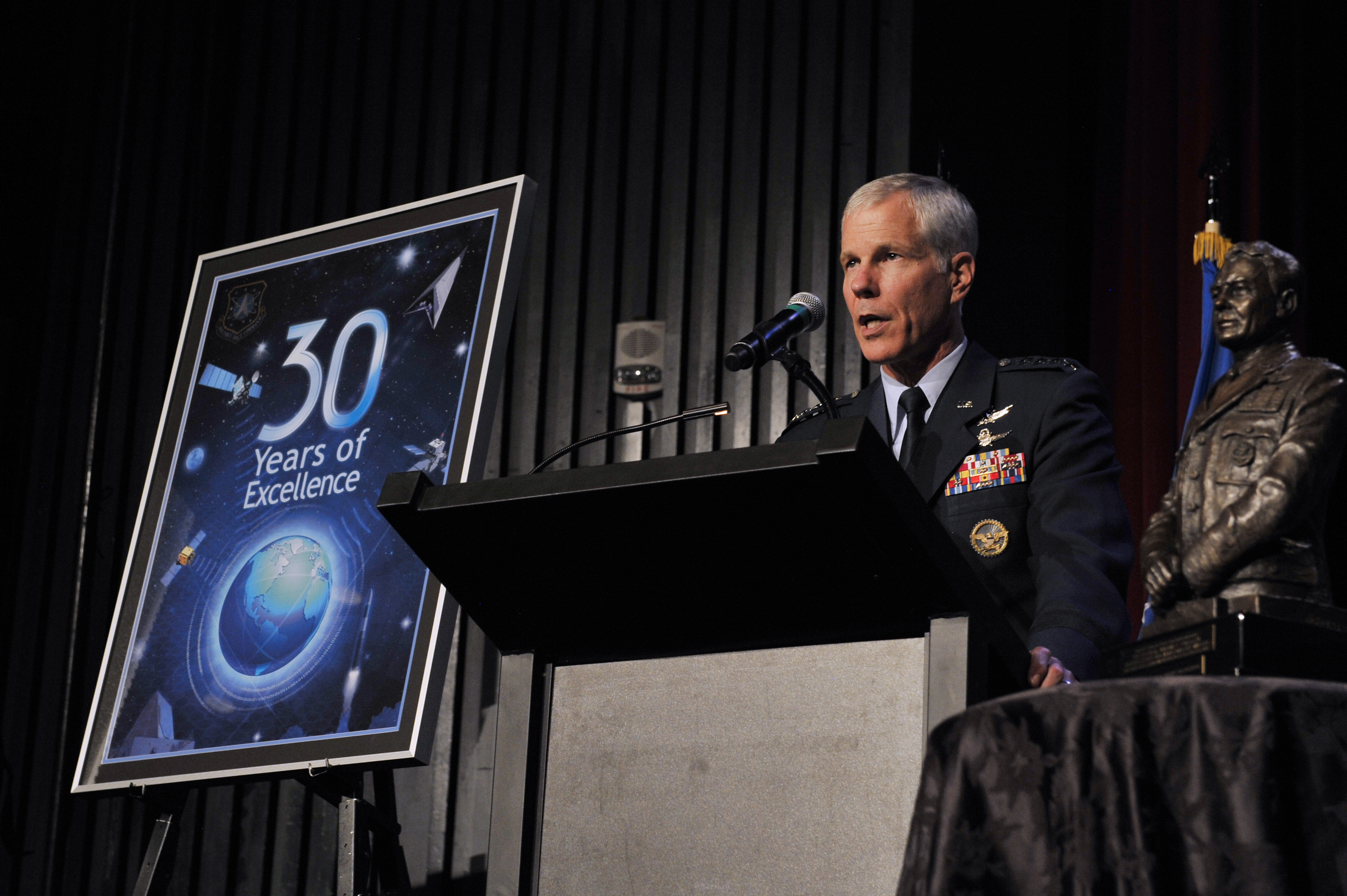
Shelton speaking at Air Force Space Command's 30th anniversary in 2012

In November 2000 Shelton moved to assume the role of director of requirements at the headquarters of Air Force Space Command in Colorado Springs, Colorado. There he was promoted to brigadier general on January 1, 2001. He stayed at Air Force Space Command until June 2003 holding various positions, including director of plans and programs and director of air and space operations.

Following his tour at Air Force Space Command, he moved on to the United States Strategic Command on Offutt AFB in Bellevue, Nebraska. There he served as director of capability and resource integration and director of plans and policy. He was also promoted to major general on July 1, 2004.

In May 2005, Shelton moved to assume command of the 14th Air Force from Vandenberg AFB. In July 2006, he also assumed command of the Joint Functional Component Command for Space, which is attached to the United States Strategic Command.

The president nominated Shelton for the appointment to lieutenant general with continued assignment as the 14 AF/CC and CDR JFCC SPACE (Ref: 8 November 2007 Senior Leader Announcement, AF/A1). After Senate confirmation, Lt Gen Shelton pinned on his new rank 8 January 2008. Gen Kevin P. Chilton, CDRUSSTRATCOM, presided; Gen C. Robert Kehler, AFSPC/CC, also spoke during the ceremony held at Vandenberg AFB, California.

In December 2008, Lt Gen Shelton was appointed chief of warfighting integration and chief information officer (CIO), Office of the Secretary of the Air Force.

On 5 January 2011, Lt General Shelton was promoted to the rank of general and became commander, Air Force Space Command.

=== Badges, awards and decorations ===
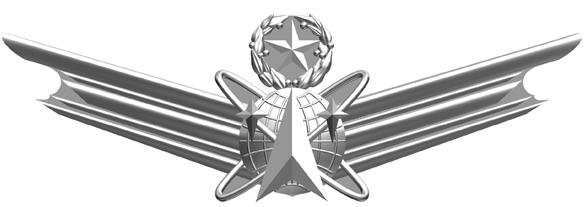
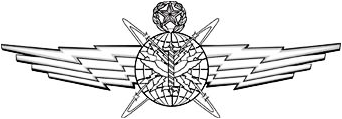
Master Space Operations Badge
Master Cyberspace Operator Badge
Basic Parachutist Badge
Office of the Secretary of Defense Identification Badge
Headquarters Air Force badge

Air Force Distinguished Service Medal with two oak leaf clusters
Defense Superior Service Medal with oak leaf cluster
Legion of Merit with oak leaf cluster
Defense Meritorious Service Medal with oak leaf cluster
Meritorious Service Medal with four oak leaf clusters
Air Force Commendation Medal
Joint Meritorious Unit Award with two oak leaf clusters
Air Force Outstanding Unit Award with one silver and three bronze oak leaf clusters
Air Force Organizational Excellence Award with two oak leaf clusters
National Defense Service Medal with bronze service star
Global War on Terrorism Service Medal
Air Force Expeditionary Service Ribbon
Air Force Longevity Service Award with silver and three bronze oak leaf clusters
Air Force Training Ribbon

=== Effective dates of promotion ===
Insignia	Rank	Date
	General	January 5, 2011
	Lieutenant general	December 20, 2007
	Major general	July 1, 2004
	Brigadier general	January 1, 2001
	Colonel	February 1, 1994
	Lieutenant colonel	March 1, 1990
	Major	May 1, 1985
	Captain	June 2, 1980
	First lieutenant	June 2, 1978
	Second lieutenant	June 2, 1976
