= John C. Hollister =

General John C. Hollister
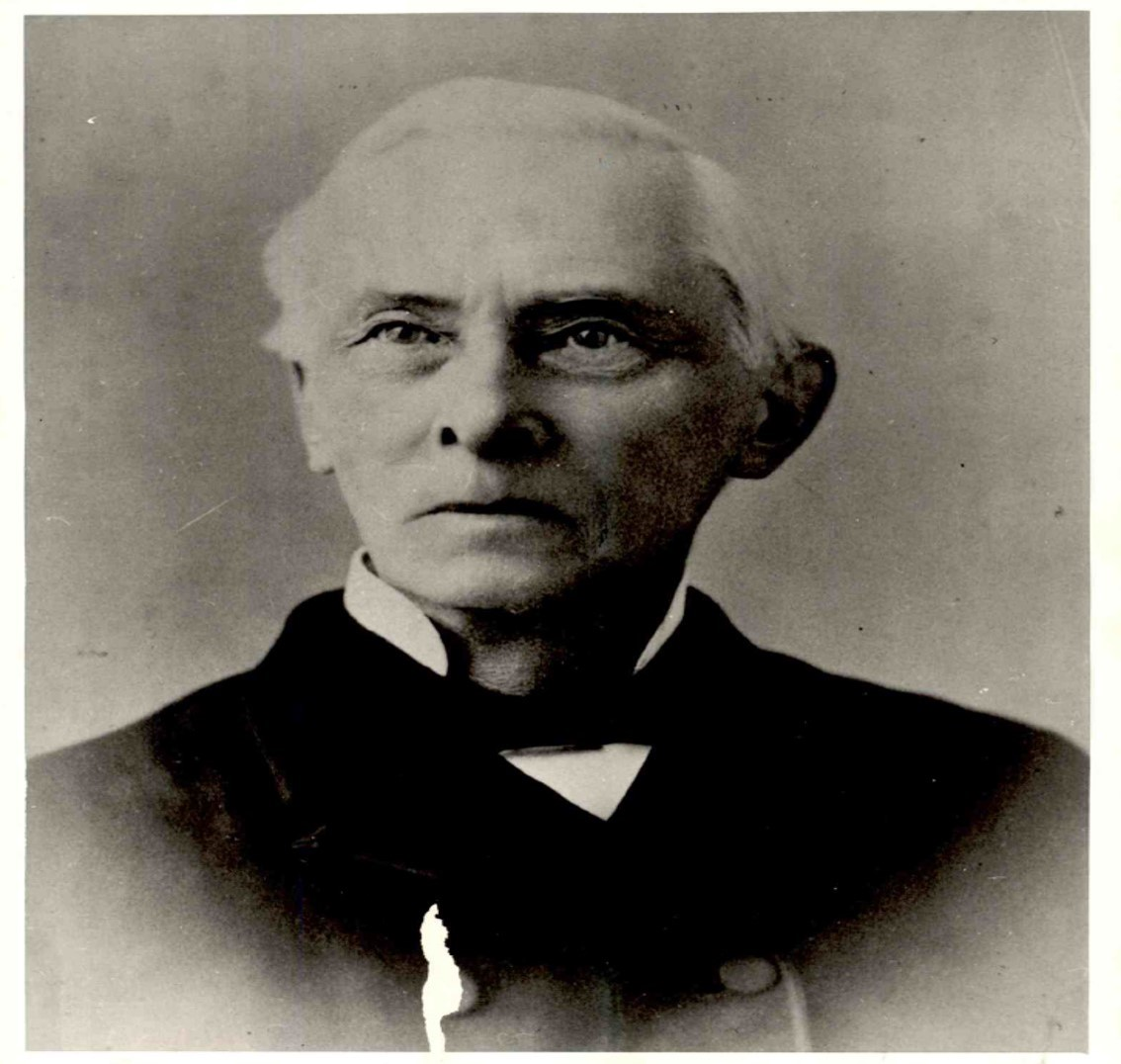
- John C. Hollister
- Born: June 2, 1818; Manchester, VT
- Died: August 29, 1903 (aged 85); New Haven, CT
- Spouse: Martha L. Bradley (1841–1949) Sarah S. Shipman (1850-1903, his death)
- Military career
- Allegiance: United States
- Branch: United States Army
- Rank: Major General
- Commands: Connecticut State Militia
- Website: www.ct.gov/mil

John C. Hollister, born in Manchester, Vermont on June 2, 1818, was the tenth Adjutant General of the State of Connecticut. From 1850 to 1865 he was Justice of the Peace and as such Acting Judge of the City Court of New Haven, and served as clerk of the state senate in 1848. He was a superintendent of the Sunday School of St. Paul's Episcopal Church in New Haven, as well as treasurer of the parish.

== Military career ==
In his early manhood Hollister took a deep interest in military affairs. He was appointed Captain of the New Haven "Blues" militia, for ten years. In 1855 Hollister was elected as Connecticut Adjutant General by Governor W. T Minor. Hollister for two years was an instructor in General Russell's military school.

== Personal life ==
John Clark Hollister was the son of Marinus and Hannah Burton Hollister. He prepped for college at the Burr Seminary in Manchester, and graduated from Yale College in the class of 1840, followed by the study of law at Yale Law School and with the firm of Bates and Huntington in Northampton, Mass. In 1842 he was admitted to the Connecticut bar. He moved from Manchester, Vermont to New Haven. On February 17, 1841, he married Martha L. Bradley of New Haven, Connecticut. He married his second wife, Sarah S. Shipman, October 31, 1850. He had three children one boy and two girls; Herbet H. Hollister, Mary I. Hollister, and Caroline S. Hollister. Hollister died of paralysis on August 29, 1903, in New Haven.

Military offices
Preceded by Elihu W.N. Starr	Connecticut Adjutant General; 1854–1855	Succeeded by Justin Hodge
