= George Shelton (footballer, born 1899) =

English footballer

Personal information
- Full name: George Shelton
- Date of birth: 25 September 1899
- Place of birth: Sheffield, England
- Date of death: 23 February 1934 (aged 34)
- Place of death: Exeter, England
- Position: Winger

Senior career*
Years	Team	Apps	(Gls)
1918–1919	Attercliffe		
1919–1920	Star Inn Club		
1920–1922	The Wednesday	17	(0)
1922–1926	Exeter City	75	(8)
1926–1927	New Brighton	24	(3)
1927	Okehampton		
Total		116	(11)
- * Club domestic league appearances and goals

George Shelton (25 September 1899 – 23 February 1934) was an English footballer who played in the Football League for Exeter City, New Brighton and The Wednesday.

After retiring from football, he became the landlord of the Bull Hotel in Exeter.

Shelton was born on 25 September 1899 in Sheffield. He died on 23 February 1934 in Exeter at the age of 34.
