= George Henry Shelton =

United States Army general

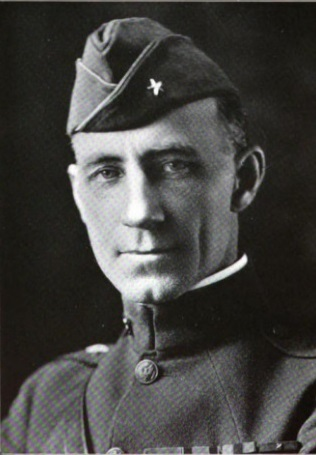
- From the 1921 annual report of the Association of Graduates of the United States Military Academy
- Born: June 16, 1871; Seymour, Connecticut
- Died: November 2, 1920 (aged 49); Washington, D.C.
- Burial place: Arlington National Cemetery
- Relatives: George P. Shelton (father)
- Military career
- Allegiance: United States
- Branch: United States Army
- Service years: 1896–1920
- Rank: Brigadier general
- Service number: O-14504
- Commands: 104th Infantry Regiment; 51st Brigade, 26th Division; 52nd Brigade, 26th Division
- Conflicts: Spanish–American War; Philippine–American War; World War I
- Awards: Army Distinguished Service Medal

George Henry Shelton (June 16, 1871 – November 2, 1920) was an American brigadier general during World War I.

== Early life and education ==
George Shelton was born on June 16, 1871, in Seymour, Connecticut. He was educated in Seymour and obtained an appointment to the United States Military Academy from Representative Washington F. Willcox in 1890, after attaining the highest score on a competitive examination, but was unable to attend because he did not score well on the school's entrance exam. He obtained another appointment in 1892, was admitted, and successfully completed the program of instruction. Shelton graduated number 36 of 73 in the class of 1896 and his classmates included Fox Conner and Malin Craig.

== Start of career ==
After graduating, Shelton was commissioned as a second lieutenant in the 11th Infantry Regiment. he served with his regiment in the Southwestern United States and was promoted to first lieutenant in 1898. During the Spanish–American War, Shelton served with the 11th Infantry in Puerto Rico. In 1901, Shelton was promoted to captain in the 25th Infantry Regiment. In 1902, he was reassigned to the 11th Infantry and he participated in combat during the Philippine–American War.

== World War I ==
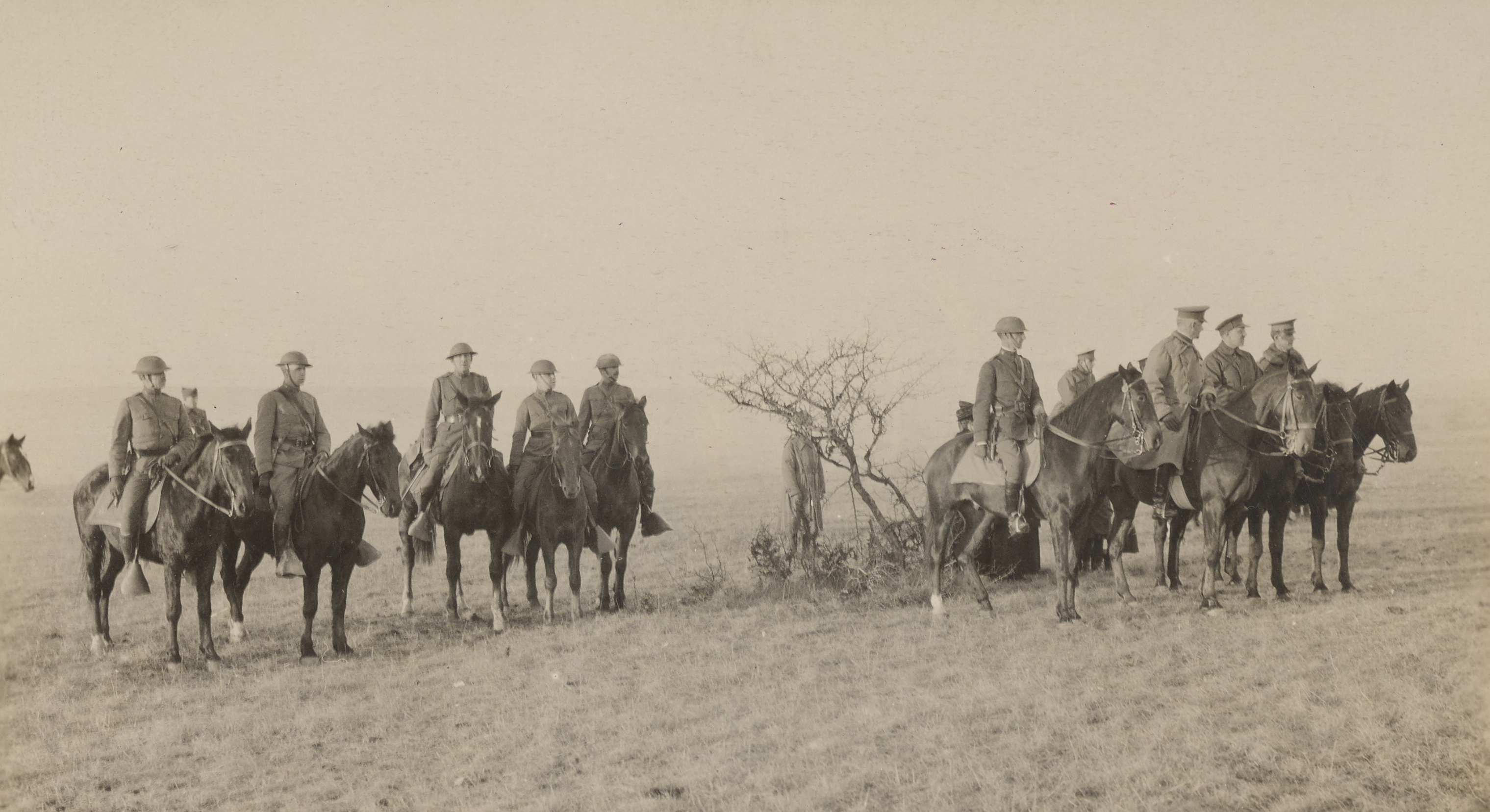
Major General Edwards and Colonel Shelton inspecting the 104th Infantry at Harreville, France, January 1918.

For several years beginning in 1908, Shelton served as a major on the staff of the Bureau of Insular Affairs, which was headed by Clarence Ransom Edwards. When Edwards was appointed commander of the 26th Division after the American entry into World War I in April 1917, he selected Shelton as his chief of staff. Shelton later commanded the 104th Infantry Regiment, which performed successfully in combat during the summer of 1918, and resulted in the government of France awarding the entire regiment the Croix de guerre. On June 16, Shelton was wounded during fighting near Royaumeix. On June 26, 1918, he was promoted to brigadier general as commander of the division's 51st Brigade. He later commanded the 26th Division's 52nd Brigade before being transferred back to command of the 51st.

== Post-World War I ==
After the war, Shelton returned to his permanent rank of colonel. He graduated from the United States Army Command and General Staff College in 1919 and was also a student at the United States Army War College.

== Awards ==
He received the Army Distinguished Service Medal posthumously in recognition of his World War I service. The citation for the medal reads:

The President of the United States of America, authorized by Act of Congress, July 9, 1918, takes pride in presenting the Army Distinguished Service Medal (Posthumously) to Brigadier General George Henry Shelton, United States Army, for exceptionally meritorious and distinguished services to the Government of the United States, in a duty of great responsibility during World War I, while Commanding the 51st Infantry Brigade, 26th Division, during the St. Mihiel and Meuse-Argonne offensives.

In addition, he was a recipient of the French Croix de guerre.

== Death and burial ==
Shelton was attending the War College when he died of blood poisoning at Walter Reed Hospital in Washington, D.C., on November 2, 1920. Shelton was buried at Arlington National Cemetery, Section 3, Site 1557-K. In 1930, Congress passed legislation restoring World War I general officers to the highest rank they had held, and Shelton's rank was posthumously upgraded.

== Family ==
Shelton was the son of Mary Lambert (Webster) Shelton and George P. Shelton, who served in the Connecticut legislature and was adjutant general of the state's National Guard. In 1905, Shelton married Bernice Vivian Barrett (1876-1942). They were the parents of a son, George William Shelton (1912-2000), a Daughter Elizabeth Sarah Shelton 2000 -2012 a son George Henry Shelton Jr a son Joseph Jason Shelton
