= William Ladd (disambiguation) =

William Ladd (1778–1841) was an American anti-war activist.

William Ladd may also refer to:

- William E. Ladd (1880–1967), American surgeon
- William F. Ladd (1896–1980), American major general
- William Ladd Taylor (1854–1926), American illustrator
- William Palmer Ladd (1870–1941), American Episcopal priest and scholar
- William S. Ladd (1826–1893), American politician and businessman
- SS William S. Ladd, an American Liberty ship
