= James S. Carson =

James S. Carson (December 9, 1874 - August 8, 1960) was chairman of Colonial Trust Company, corporate executive and Spanish–American War veteran.

James Carson started his career as a college professor but eventually became a reporter with the San Francisco Chronicle then joined the Associated Press and established its first Latin American bureau. It was headquartered in Mexico City, where he and his family lived for 11 years.

He also ran for State Senator of California at one point

After a successful career in the newspaper and reporting business, Carson used his international experience to become a success in business. He was an executive of the American and Foreign Power Company prior to joining the Colonial Trust Company. He was a supporter and advocate for open trade between the US and Latin American countries. Carson was one of the three US executives who organized the World Two-Way Trade Fair in 1937. He was one of the originators of World Trade Week in New York City and served as its chairman for many years. While a vice president at American and Foreign Power (then a subsidiary of General Electric), Carson was also the chairman of the Foreign Trade Education Committee of the National Foreign Trade Council.

Additionally, Carson was very involved with creating and running organizations that would help countries and their immigrants do business in the United States. He was one of the founding member and on the board of directors of the Venezuelan American Association, in 1936. In 1939, Carson, along with John L. Merrill, president, Central & South American Telegraph Company predecessor to the Atlantic Cable and Undersea Communications, Robert De F. Boomer from the Authority on Latin America and Herman G. Brock, VP Guaranty Trust Company all who established the VAA, founded the Peruvian-American Association and Carson served on its board of directors. Carson also served was the president of the Ecuadorian American Association from 1954 to 1955.

Carson was a writer of position papers on doing business with Latin America. His work and reports have been cited in several books including Uneven Encounters: Making Race and Nation in Brazil and the United States, by Micol Seigel. and Beyond National Identity: Pictorial Indigenism as a Modernist Strategy in Andean art by Michele Greet.

For the 1939 New York World's Fair, Carson pitched Grover Whalen on the idea of having a "Pan America" exhibit.

He was the father of long time Ladies' Home Journal executive editor, Mary Bass and the father-in-law of New York Post editor Joseph Cookman.
