= Frances Winwar =

American novelist

Frances Winwar

Frances Winwar (née Francesca Vinciguerra; 3 May 1900 – 24 July 1985), was a Sicilian-born American biographer, translator, and fiction writer.

== Early life ==
Winwar was born Francesca Vinciguerra in Taormina, Sicily and came to the United States through Ellis Island in June 1907. Her pseudonym Winwar is an calque of her birth name; she was required to change her name as a condition of publishing her first book. She was the daughter of Domenico Vinciguerra and the singer Giovanna Sciglio and after emigrating to the United States the family settled in New York. Winwar studied at Hunter College and Columbia University.

== Career ==
Winwar started her career at The Masses magazine at the age of 18. Following the publication of an essay in The Freeman in 1923 she worked for the magazine and did further work for the New York Times, New Republic and the Saturday Review of Literature.

Winwar is best known for her series of romanticized biographies of nineteenth century English writers. She was also a frequent translator of classic Italian works into English and published several romantic novels set during historical events.

In the 1930s and 1940s, Winwar was an outspoken opponent of Italian Fascism.

Winwar died in New York in 1985.

The Frances Winwar collection of manuscripts and correspondence is held at the Howard Gotlieb Archival Research Center at Boston University.

== Selected published works ==
- 1927: The Ardent Flame, New York: Century; OCLC 335475032
- 1928: The Golden Round, New York: Century; OCLC 3039718
- 1929: Pagan Interval, Indianapolis: Bobbs-Merrill
- 1930: (translation) The Decameron by Giovanni Boccaccio, New York: Limited Editions Club
- 1931: (translation) Simon Boccanegra, New York: Fred Rullman
- 1933: Poor Splendid Wings: The Rossettis and Their Circle, Boston: Little, Brown
- 1935: The Romantic Rebels, Boston: Little, Brown
- 1937: Gallows Hill, New York: Holt
- 1938: Farewell the Banner, ..."Three Persons and One Soul"...: Coleridge, Wordsworth and Dorothy, New York: Doubleday, Doran
- 1938: Puritan City: The Story of Salem, New York: Robert M. McBride
- 1940: Oscar Wilde and the Yellow Nineties, New York: Harper
- 1941: American Giant: Walt Whitman and His Times, New York: Harper
- 1943: The Sentimentalist: A Novel, New York: Harper
- 1947: George Sand and Her Times: The Life of the Heart, A Biography, Garden City: Garden City Publishing
- 1948: The Saint and the Devil: Joan of Arc and Gilles de Rais—A Biographical Study in Good and Evil, New York: Harper
- 1948: Joan of Arc; OCLC 300010555
- 1949: (edited) Ruotolo, Man and Artist, New York: Liveright
- 1950: (translation) Joseph Méry and Camille du Locle, Don Carlo (opera in four acts), New York: Fred Rullman; OCLC 421454687
- 1951: The Immortal Lovers: Elizabeth Barrett and Robert Browning, A Biography, New York: Harper
- 1952: The Land of the Italian People: Illustrated from Photos, Philadelphia: Lippincott
- 1953: The Eagle and the Rock, New York: Harper
- 1953: Napoleon and the Battle of Waterloo [reprinted in 1967 as All about Napoleon], New York: Random House
- 1954: The Last Love of Camille: A Novel, New York: Harper
- 1954: Queen Elizabeth and the Spanish Armada, New York: Random House
- 1956: Wingless Victory: A Biography of Gabriele d'Annunzio and Eleanore Duse [reprinted in 1957 as Wings of Fire: A Biography of Gabriele d'Annunzio and Eleonore Duse], New York: Harper
- 1957: Elizabeth: The Romantic Story of Elizabeth Barrett Browning, World Publishing OCLC 993216534
- 1957: Elizabeth: A Biography (of Elizabeth Barrett Browning)
- 1959: The Haunted Palace: A Life of Edgar Allan Poe, New York: Harper
- 1959: Cupid, the God of Love, New York: Random House
- 1961: Jean-Jacques Rousseau: The Conscience of an Era, New York: Random House

== Family ==
Her husbands were:

1. V.J. Jerome (né Jerome Isaac Romaine; 1896–1965), writer, communist propagandist (married 1919);
2. Bernard David N. Brebanier (1903–1977), educator (married 1925; divorced 1942);
3. Richard Wilson Webb (1901–1966), mystery novelist (married 1943);
4. Francis duPont Lazenby, Ph.D. (1916–2003) (married 1949; divorced 1953); after divorcing; Lazenby, in 1955, joined the faculty at the University of Notre Dame; in 1971, after 25 years at Notre Dame, while Associate Professor of Modern and Classical Languages, Notre Dame named him Professor Emeritus.
