= USS Alabaster =

US navy vessel

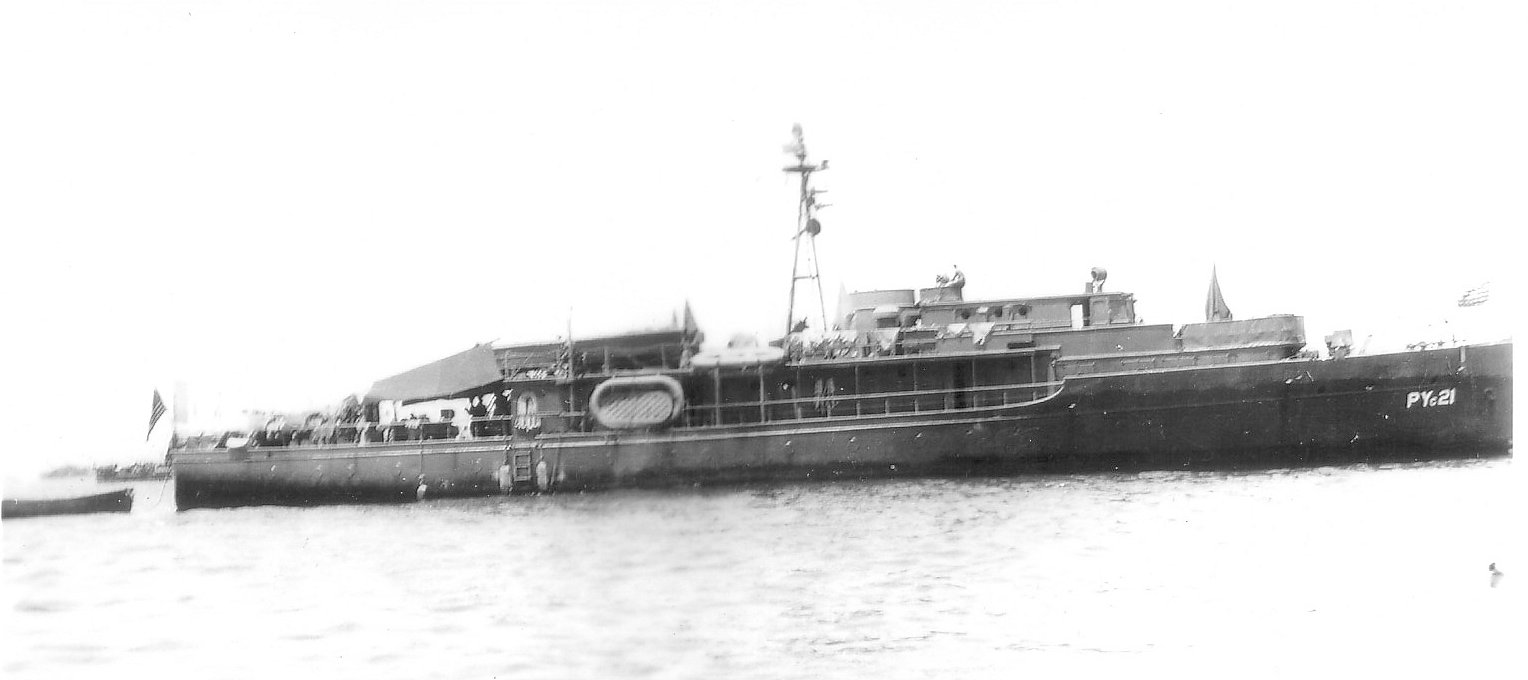
- USS Alabaster (PYc-21) at anchor in San Pedro Bay, Philippine Islands while at Navy Yard for modification. c. July 1945

History

United States
- Name: Alamo
- Owner: William F. Ladd
- Builder: Mathis Yacht Building Company, Camden, New Jersey
- Launched: 1932
- Fate: Sold in 1934 to Lucius B. Manning, President of the Cord Automobile Corp

United States
- Name: Ronaele
- Owner: Lucius B. Manning
- Acquired: 1934
- Fate: Sold back to William F. Ladd in 1936

United States
- Name: Rellimpa, Ranley and Ronaele
- Owner: William F. Ladd
- Acquired: 1936
- Fate: Sold to the Navy 3 January 1942

United States
- Name: Alabaster
- Namesake: Alabaster
- Builder: Philadelphia Navy Yard
- Acquired: 3 January 1942
- Commissioned: 31 January 1942
- Decommissioned: 17 December 1945
- Stricken: 21 January 1946
- Fate: Sold into private ownership, 9 April 1947; Destroyed by fire, 1982

General characteristics
- Type: Patrol boat
- Displacement: 230 long tons (234 t)
- Length: 143 ft (44 m)
- Beam: 23 ft 5 in (7.14 m)
- Draft: 12 ft 5 in (3.78 m)
- Speed: 14.5 knots (26.9 km/h; 16.7 mph)
- Complement: 48
- Armament: 1 × 3 in (76 mm) gun; 2 × .50 cal (12.7 mm) machine guns; 2 × Depth charge tracks

The USS Alabaster (PYc-21) was a coastal patrol yacht of the United States Navy during World War II.

The ship was built in 1932 by the Mathis Yacht Building Co. of Camden, New Jersey, as the yacht Alamo as confirmed by the oval shipbuilder's plate affixed in the upper access portion of its engine room. Alamo was designed by Tams, Incorporated for William F. Ladd with a cruising radius of 4,000 mi (6,400 km) and a fresh water capacity of 5,500 US gal (21,000 L; 4,600 imp gal). A pair of Winton diesel engines of 375 horsepower each and two 15 kW Winton diesel generators provided propulsive and electrical power. A speed of 14.5 knots (16.7 mph; 26.9 km/h) was achieved in trials. The hull construction made extensive use of welding. Before Navy acquisition the yacht, Mathis hull #214, official number 231388, had been named Rellimpa, Ranley, and Ronaele.

The yacht was donated to the U.S. Navy on 3 January 1942, by Eleanor Widener Dixon. It was renamed Alabaster on 13 January 1942 and simultaneously classified a coastal patrol yacht and designated PYc-21. Converted by the Philadelphia Navy Yard for naval service, it was commissioned on 31 January 1942.

== Service history ==
=== World War II, 1942–1945 ===
Assigned to the Inshore Patrol and based at the section base at Cape May, New Jersey, Alabaster began patrolling the coast of the United States from Delaware Bay to Chesapeake Bay early in February and continued that assignment through the remainder of 1942 and most of 1943. In September 1943, the Navy decided to convert the vessel to an anti-submarine warfare (ASW) training platform. She spent the next two months in the Philadelphia Navy Yard receiving the modifications needed to prepare her to carry out her new mission, On 30 November, she stood out of Philadelphia, bound for the Naval Air Station Quonset Point, Rhode Island. The following day, the patrol yacht reported for duty with the Commander, Anti-submarine Development, Atlantic Fleet, at Quonset Point and began a month of training to ready her crew for the new assignment.

On 5 January 1944, she completed her training and received orders to report to the Commander, Eastern Sea Frontier for routing to the Canal Zone. Alabaster departed Cape May on 10 January and steamed – via Charleston, Miami, and Guantánamo Bay – to Balboa, Canal Zone, where she arrived on the 25th. The ship reported for duty with the 7th Fleet and got underway on 1 February with an oil tanker bound for Australia. The patrol yacht entered port at Cairns, Australia, on St. Patrick's Day, but put to sea again on 25 March. The little warship arrived in Naval Base Milne Bay at Milne Bay, New Guinea, where she remained for about three months instructing Navy men in the use of various ASW devices. In mid-June, she moved to Seeadler Harbor at Manus in the Admiralty Islands where she resumed ASW training duties. On 19 October, she departed Manus to return to New Guinea and dropped anchor at Hollandia on the 21st. She remained at that base until the end of January 1945, providing ASW training services and making emergency repairs to radar and sonar equipment, On 31 January 1945, she weighed anchor and shaped a course for the Philippines. Alabaster arrived in San Pedro Bay, Leyte, on 6 February and resumed her previous training and repair missions.

The end of the war in mid-August 1945 found her still at Leyte, and she was then declared surplus to the needs of the Navy. The yacht cleared San Pedro Bay to return to the United States. Steaming via Eniwetok and Pearl Harbor, Alabaster entered port at San Pedro, California, on 25 October. She remained anchored in the bay at San Pedro until decommissioned on 17 December 1945. Her name was struck from the Navy List on 21 January 1946, and she was transferred to the Maritime Commission for disposal.

=== In private ownership, 1947–1982 ===
Alabaster was initially sold on 9 April 1947 to Lyman A. Whitney, of San Diego, California, however this purchase was never completed, and she was finally purchased by Col. C. S. Smith, USAR, Ret., who restored her as a private cruising yacht and renamed her Alamo.

In 1959–1960 she was the setting (called Fortuna II) for the CBS television series Mr. Lucky, starring John Vivyan, Ross Martin and Pippa Scott.

Alamo was sold in 1960 to Enrique Braun of Acapulco, renamed Fiesta II, and served as a harbor cruise vessel until 1982. In that year it was sold and towed to Puerto Vallarta to be converted to a floating restaurant. It caught fire and sank during conversion and its wreckage is now a popular scuba diving venue.
