= Reincke (surname) =

Reincke is a German language surname. Notable people with the name include:

- Frederick G. Reincke (1899–1980), United States Army general
- Heinz Reincke (1925–2011), German-born actor
