= Joseph Cookman =

American journalist (1899–1944)

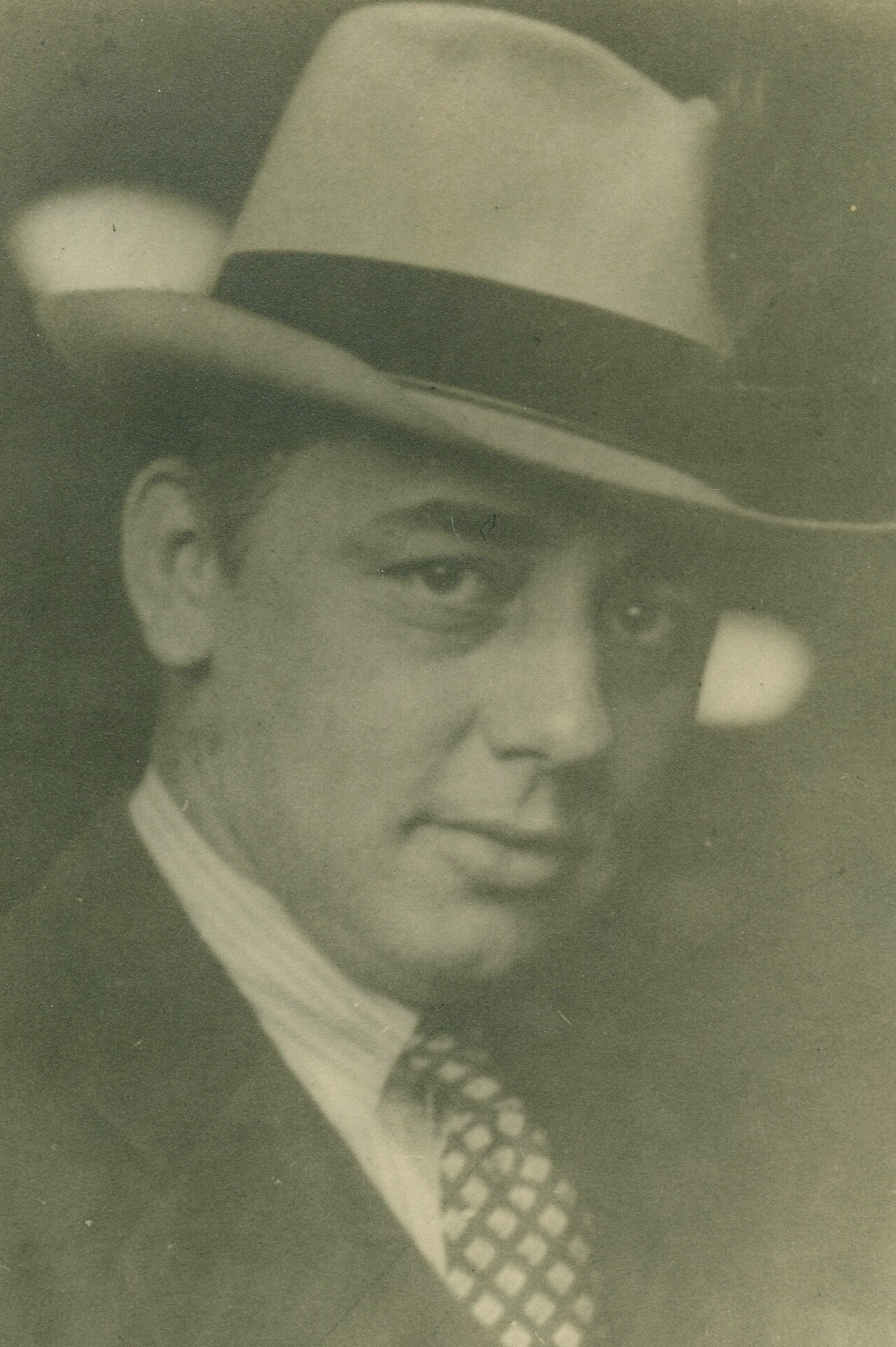
- Joe Cookman about 1942
- Born: February 6, 1899; Batley, Yorkshire, England
- Died: August 12, 1944 (aged 45); New York City, United States

Joseph Cookman (February 6, 1899 – August 12, 1944) was an American journalist, critic and a founder of The Newspaper Guild.

== Life and career ==
=== Early life ===
Born in 1899, in Batley, England, Joseph was the oldest of three children born to John and Ada (née Pattison) Cookman.

In 1907, John, the son of a Methodist minister, was sent to Canada with his young wife Ada and two of his three young kids (the youngest child Hannah, was too sick to make the journey at the time) and became a remittance man. Shortly after they arrived, John died of appendicitis.

With no money nor means to support herself, Ada put her son Joe in an orphanage at the age of 8. Subsequently, his mother got a job keeping house for a Walter Bowen and moved to his farm on Bowen-Eldridge Road in Fillmore, New York. Joe Cookman was retrieved from the orphanage and went to live with his mother and sister Grace in New York. Ada and Walter eventually would marry. Cookman graduated from a one-room school house in rural Fillmore.

He went on to study at Houghton College before joining the Army, going through officer training school at Smoky Hill Flats, Kansas, and serving in World War I as a Lieutenant in the infantry.

After the war, a friend's father who owned a steel mill, offered Cookman a job paying $75 per week. However, Joe did not want to be a steel salesman but a writer instead and moved to New York City settling on the upper west side. He shared an apartment with his sister Grace who had become a nurse.

=== Married life ===
On November 26, 1928, Cookman married Mary Carter Carson, daughter of James Carson a former chairman of the Colonial Trust Company. She was known professionally as Mary Bass for most of her career. They had an episcopal wedding and a reception at the Englewood Golf Club. Ushers at the wedding were newspaper men Lindsay Perrott, Ted Dibbell (NY Post), Joy Lilly and John Collins. Bass's brother was also an usher. As newly-weds, they first lived at 750 Riverside Drive in Manhattan. They later moved to the Lower East Side around 14th street, with Cookman working at the New York Post and Bass working as an advertising assistant at a department store.

Through his work at the Sun and the Post, Cookman and Bass became close friends with Bruce Gould and Beatrice Blackmar Gould. When Bruce and Beatrix moved from the New York Post to the Ladies Home Journal in 1935, they brought Mary there the next year as an editorial assistant. She eventually was named executive editor and worked with the Goulds at Ladies Home Journal for nearly 30 years before retiring in 1963.

Cookman and Bass socialized with much of the New York city literary crowd and counted Bruce Gould and Beatrice Blackmar Gould, Martha Ostenso, Ruth McKenney, Ted Dibbell, Lindsey Perrott, Bernard Grebanier, Hayward Broun among their numerous friends. This crowd used to frequent Harlem night clubs the Cotton Club and The Nest during Prohibition.

Cookman and Bass moved to the Emery Roth designed building at 570 Park Avenue in May 1941. They had no children. Cookman and Bass were married for 16 years.

=== Career ===
Cookman's professional career began in 1922 in New York City where he convinced the City Editor of the New York Telegram (later known as the New York World-Telegram) to give him a job as a reporter. He also worked briefly at The New York Sun. Cookman was offered a job as the drama critic for the Bronx Home News. He joined the New York Evening Post in 1925 as a reporter and later as assistant city editor. He eventually became the paper's Chief Editorial Writer and worked at the Post until his death in 1944.

In 1933, Cookman, along with Heywood Broun and several others, founded The Newspaper Guild with Cookman elected as its original Second Vice President.

Cookman's work was listed in The Mammoth Book of Journalism: 101 Masterpieces from the Finest Writers and Reporters. He was considered the best reporter at the paper by the senior executives such as Owner/Publisher J. David Stern, and editors Walter Lister Sr. and Harry Saylor. As such, he was typically tapped to cover the largest stories of the time.

=== Story coverage ===
Throughout his career, Cookman covered some of the most important stories around the country including:

- The funeral of Huey Long
- The inquest into Long's assassination
- Dutch Schultz's invasion of the Harlem numbers racket
- The 1932 Lindbergh kidnapping of Charles Lindbergh's infant son
- The Rev. Charles Coughlin rallies
- The 1934 burning of the SS Morro Castle.
- The 1936 murder investigation of novelist Nancy Titterton, the wife of Lewis Titterton, the then President of NBC
- The Judiciary Reorganization Bill of 1937, aka Roosevelt packing of the Supreme Court.
- The Ford Motor Company strike of 1941
- The Pan American World Airways plane Pacific Clipper's circumnavigation of the globe in December 1941 - January 1942.

Cookman was also present, witnessed and reported on the 1935 execution of murderer Eva Coo at Sing Sing Prison.

During his investigation of gangster Dutch Schultz, he was mugged and severely beaten. While never proven, it was widely suspected that Dutch ordered the beating as a warning to Cookman and other reporters to cease their investigations of his crime and racketeering organization.

=== Death ===
Cookman died in his home August 12, 1944 of a heart ailment. Upon his death, The Post received a significant outpouring of mail from readers, friends and admirers of Cookman and his years of contributions to the paper. The Post paid its own tribute then additionally selected and published a memorial by Cookman's good friend and drama historian Bernard Grebanier.
