= Hartford County Sheriff's Department Connecticut =

The Hartford County Sheriff's Department (also known as the Hartford County Sheriff's Office) was a 300-person law enforcement agency that served the twenty-nine towns of Hartford County, Connecticut in North Central Connecticut. Hartford County was constituted in 1666. The Code of 1650 of the General Court of Connecticut allowed "the marshall" to collect fees for the service of executions and attachments and fines for breaches of law. In 1698, marshals became "sheriffs." In 1722, sheriffs were given the duty of conserving the peace and could command people to help them. Two years later, each sheriff became responsible for the jail in his county, with the right to appoint people as "keepers." In 1766, limits were placed on the number of deputies a high sheriff could appoint, although on special occasions other people could be used as well.

Until the early 1800s, sheriffs were appointed, jointly or solely by the governor and the General Assembly, depending on the year. A constitutional amendment adopted in October 1838 established elections as the process for selecting high sheriffs. In 1984, Ronald Reagan addressed the National Sheriffs Association Convention in Hartford hosted by High Sheriff Patrick Hogan.

In 2000, Article 4, Section 25 of the Connecticut Constitution was amended to abolish the office of sheriff and the primary duties were transferred to the Connecticut Judicial Marshal employed by the Judicial Branch and Connecticut State Marshal appointed by the State Marshal Commission. Except for the high sheriff, every member of the department became a state or judicial marshal in 2000 depending on their previous status. Judicial marshals became state employees, members of the union IBPO Local 731, and the General Assembly created an advisory board under the control of the State Marshals that has considerable influence over their work conditions as independent contractors.

== Personnel ==
The personnel of Hartford County Sheriff's Department included:

- The High Sheriff – Elected by the voters of the county every four years, the sheriff appointed all the members of the department upon taking office. In 1999, the sheriff received an annual salary of $37,000 from the state, but supplemented his salary through fees generated by serving civil process.
- The Chief Deputy Sheriff -Appointed by the high sheriff, the Chief Deputy Sheriff acted as the high sheriff in his absence. In 1999, he received an annual salary of $11,000, $100 per diem for attending court and collected fees for serving civil process.
- Deputy Sheriffs -Limited by statute to 72, deputy sheriffs served civil process including: evictions, foreclosures, civil complaints, wage garnishments and subpoenas. Deputy Sheriffs did not have a salary but could collect as much as $1million in fees during a year.
- Special Deputy Sheriffs – The uniformed members of the department, approximately 230 "specials" were responsible for protecting 13 courthouse sites, transporting prisoners, guarding detention facilities and enforcing the criminal law as required. The command structure for the "specials" included a Chief Supervisor, Captains, Lieutenants and Sergeants. They were paid a per diem in 1999 ranging from $105 to $145 based on function and rank.

== Duties ==
As a law enforcement officer enshrined in the state constitution, the elected sheriff had broad statutory powers to enforce the law and maintain order in Hartford County. As a practical matter, the sheriff's office focused on duties closely connected to supporting the state court system including:

=== Detention ===
Until 1968, the Hartford County Sheriff's Department ran the Hartford County Jail located on Seyms Street in Hartford, the High Sheriff and his family lived in the jail until the newly formed Connecticut Department of Correction took over responsibility for the facility. In 1986, the Hartford County Sheriff's Department became responsible for prisoners held prior to arraignment at the detention facility located in the basement of the new criminal courthouse at 101 Lafayette Street in Hartford. The facility has 48 double cells and two large gang cells. The mix of prisoners held in the Lafayette street facility included those recently arrested, immigrants in the process of being deported by federal authorities, prisoners in court for trial and convicted felons (including death row inmates) appearing in court on appeal. In 1989 the sheriff's department became responsible for assisting the Hartford Police Department with booking and detaining all arrestees at the city booking facility, formerly at 155 Morgan Street in Hartford.

=== Courthouse Security ===
The Hartford County Sheriff's Department was responsible for protecting the public and maintaining order at the Supreme Court in Hartford, the Appellate Court in Hartford and all the Superior Courthouses in the county. The courthouses were located in the towns of Hartford, West Hartford, New Britain, Bristol, Enfield and Manchester. In carrying out their courthouse duties, Hartford County Sheriff's Department personnel had to deescalate violent confrontations and arrest perpetrators, seize weapons and drugs brought into courthouses, and provide security for high-profile death penalty and gang trials. The department also managed high-profile court appearances by semi-celebrities including Oksana Baiul charged with DUI in 1997 at the West Hartford Courthouse.

=== Prisoner Transportation ===
The Hartford County Sheriff's Department was responsible for the transportation of all arrestees of the Hartford Police Department and prisoners on trial between court and the Hartford Community Correctional Center, Whiting Forensic Institute and other state correctional facilities.

=== Civil Process ===
Hartford County Deputy Sheriffs were responsible for the service of civil process in Hartford County. Also known as "paper sheriffs," deputy sheriffs had the same powers as a high sheriff with respect to serving legal process. Each appointee was responsible for his or her own performance The major types of work performed by deputy sheriffs were service of process, executions against wages, bank accounts, and property, and the collection of delinquent taxes. Service of process includes writs, summonses, subpoenas, evictions, and capias (writs that require taking a person into custody). Deputies receive most of their work directly from law firms, governmental entities, and individuals who need papers served. The duties of deputy sheriffs required them to divide their time between office activities and work on the road. A considerable amount of record keeping was involved, both before and after a document is served

=== Child Support Enforcement ===
In 1996, in coordination with then Connecticut Attorney General Richard Blumenthal, the High Sheriff at the time created a special unit to help clear the backlog of thousands of outstanding civil warrants held by state agencies for parents who owed back child support and failed to appear in court to explain non-payment, During its four-year existence the unit recovered over $1million in back child support.

=== Community Policing ===
In the late 1990s the Hartford County Sheriff's Department engaged in a number of community orientated policing efforts including: providing free cellphones for block watches to groups such as Hartford Areas Rally Together (H.A.R.T) to better communicate with police and working with the community, police and prosecutors to seize "nuisance properties" that were the focus of reoccurring prostitution complaints.

== Hartford County High Sheriffs ==
- Walter J. Kupchunos Jr. (D) 1994-2000
- Alfred J. Rioux (D) 1986-1994
- Patrick J. Hogan (D) 1960-1986 Former President of the National Sheriffs' Association
- Donald H. Potter (D) 1950-1960
- Frederick G. Reincke 1947-1948
