= Mary Bass =

American journalist, author, and executive editor

Mary Cookman Bass (July 13, 1905 – August 26, 1996) was an American journalist, writer, and executive editor of the Ladies' Home Journal from 1936 to 1963.

== Childhood and early years ==
Mary Carter Carson was born in Chicago in 1905. Both her parents were from California. Her father was a college professor but wanted to be in the newspaper business and eventually got a job with the Associated Press and was posted to Mexico. Mary lived in Mexico for 11 years.

She got into Barnard College after only 3 years of high school. She met her husband at a party while she was still at Barnard. He was 6 years older than she was and working as a newspaper reporter.

== Career ==
Bass, then known as Mary Cookman (At the time she was the wife of New York Evening Post executive editor Joseph Cookman), joined the Ladies' Home Journal in 1936 as an editorial assistant but soon thereafter was named executive editor by the editors Bruce Gould and Beatrice Blackmar Gould. (Joseph Cookman died in 1944, Mary Cookman married New York lawyer Basil Bass in 1945, and she thereafter was known professionally as Mary Bass.)

Bass was responsible for day-to-day operations of the magazine while the Goulds engaged in longer range creative strategy and planning. Bass oversaw the creation of one of the most popular features of the Journal called How America Lives. This series of articles was supposed to run for one year. It ran for 20. With the Goulds, she also oversaw the launch in 1953 of "Can This Marriage Be Saved?" by journalist Dorothy Cameron Disney, who continued to research and write the column for 30 years.

The Goulds retired in 1962, and Bass left the Ladies' Home Journal the following year. Subsequently, she wrote a column for Family Circle called Careers at Home. She also published a book by the same name. Additionally, she worked at Seventeen.

A native of Chicago, Bass was the daughter of James S. Carson, who later was chairman of the Colonial Trust Company of New York. She graduated from Barnard College. She was a member of the Cosmopolitan Club, the Women's National Press Club, and the Overseas Press Club. She was married and widowed four times and had one son, Richardson C. Bass. Mary Bass Newlin died August 26, 1996, at her home in Amagansett, N.Y.

== Timeline ==
- 8/28 Marries Joseph Cookman, an editor
- 1936 Joins Ladies' Home Journal (LHJ)
- 5/41 Moves to 570 Park Ave, NYC
- 8/44 Husband Joseph Cookman dies of heart attack
- 1945 War correspondent for LHJ
- 12/45 Marries Basil Bass, a lawyer
- 10/46 Son is born; moves to 850 Park Ave, NYC
- 11/56 Husband Basil Bass dies
- 8/60 Father James S. Carson dies
- 5/64 Marries George R. Gibson an advertising executive
- 6/69 Husband George R. Gibson drowns
- 1976 Marries A. Chauncey Newlin, a lawyer and philanthropist
- 1983 Husband A. Chauncey Newlin dies
- 8/96 Mary Cookman Bass Newlin dies
