= George Haven =

General George Haven
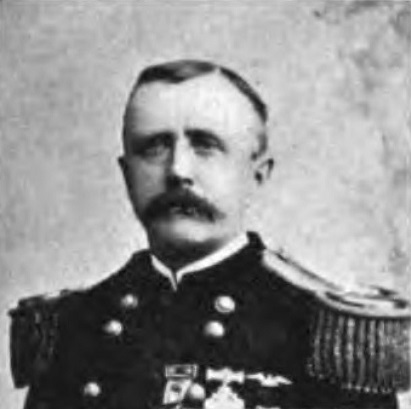
- George Haven
- Born: March 27, 1844; New London, Connecticut
- Died: August 21, 1933 (aged 89); New London, Connecticut
- Spouse: Ella A. Beckwith
- Military career
- Allegiance: United States
- Branch: United States Army
- Rank: Major General
- Commands: Connecticut State Militia
- Website: www.ct.gov/mil

George Haven, born in New London, Connecticut, on March 27, 1844, was the thirtieth Adjutant General of the State of Connecticut. He was the son of Urbane and Sarah (Rogers) Haven. Both were members of old Connecticut families. Haven acquired his education early in public schools of New Haven. He loved books, but with the rumors of war he joined the National Guard at the age of 17. After being discharged on November 19, 1864, Haven returned home to New London and worked for the Wilson Manufacturing Company, with which he was connected for 18 years. He left the employ of the Wilson Company at around 1886, and the next year went to work for the Quinnipiac Company. In 1888 he was appointed Chief of police of New London. Haven served at the City of New London for six years as Alderman and Councilman.

== Military career ==
George Haven enlisted in Company E, 2ND Infantry Regiment, Connecticut. He was mustered out of Company E, 2ND Infantry Regiment, Connecticut, on August 7, 1861. On November 25, 1861, he enlisted in Company C, 1st Cavalry Regiment, Connecticut, and was made corporal on February 11, 1864. His regiment was in more than 50 engagements and, although he participated in every battle, he was never wounded nor taken prisoner. In 1888 Haven was promoted through the ranks to the rank of brigadier general while working for the New London Police Department. On April 14, 1865, he became a member of Company D, Third Regiment of National Guards, and was made First Sergeant eight days later. His succeeding promotions were as follows: Second Lieutenant, July 6, 1865; First Lieutenant, December 1, 1865; Captain, August 10, 1865; Major of the Third Regiment, September 3, 1870; Lieutenant Colonel, April 20, 1872. After resigning on April 21, 1873, he rejoined the Guards and was made captain and adjutant on February 18, 1879; Major, March 20, 1882; Colonel, July 12, 1886; Brigadier-General, commanding the brigade, on May 28, 1892. On January 7, 1897, Haven was appointed Connecticut Adjutant General until 1899. He was an active member of the Grand Army; he founded of W.W. Perkins Post, No. 47, and filled its principles offices, serving as Commander for three terms. Haven was also a Master Mason.

== Personal life ==
Haven married Miss Ella A. Beckwith in October, 1870. She died in 1877. They had two children, a boy and a girl, who died very young. He remarried in October 1882, with Miss Mattie A. Comstock, of New London, a daughter of Captain Horace Comstock. They had one son, Morgan B., born in February 1893. George Haven died following an illness of two years on August 21, 1933, at the age 89.

Military offices
Preceded by Charles P. Graham	Connecticut Adjutant General; 1897-1899	Succeeded by Louis N. VanKeuren
