= New York Star (1800s newspaper) =

1868–1891 New York newspaper

- Type: Daily
- Founded: 1868
- Ceased publication: 1891
- Headquarters: Manhattan

The New York Star or the Daily Star (1868–1891) was a New York City newspaper.

The paper was founded around early 1868 by employees of The Sun, who feared that the recent purchase of the Sun by Charles Anderson Dana would turn the political bent of that paper Republican. Joe Howard, Jr. soon took control of the paper and remained on as editor, publisher and subsequently chief proprietor until the spring of 1875. A series of other editors and owners followed, each generally unsuccessful in their attempts to make the paper profitable. It went from daily publication to weekly, but then William Dorsheimer purchased the paper in 1885 and restarted daily publication, running the paper until his death in 1888. Finally, Frank Munsey, who would years later be known as a great consolidator of newspapers, took a six-month option from owner Collis Potter Huntington to buy the Star in 1891. Munsey turned the paper into a tabloid and renamed it the Daily Continent as of February 1, 1891. When it did not succeed after a few months, he returned the new paper to Huntington.

When Munsey's plan to take over the paper were announced, the Sun, still nursing the slight which led to the founding of the Star, published a piece on the "long, very remarkable, and altogether disastrous history" of the paper.

The gossip column Bab's Babble by Isabel Mallon got its start in the Star around 1888.

== Other Stars ==
The title New York Star has been used multiple times for unrelated newspapers, including the New York Morning Star (1810–13), a newspaper in the 1820s, the New York Evening Star founded by Major Noah in 1833 or 34, a theatrical weekly founded in 1908, and the 1948-49 successor to PM. It is also the title of the fictitious newspaper in the television show Sex and the City.
