= Reginald B. De Lacour =

United States Army general

- Born: November 8, 1886; Wichita, Kansas
- Died: March 21, 1948 (aged 61); Hartford, Connecticut
- Military career
- Allegiance: United States
- Branch: United States Army
- Rank: Major General
- Commands: Connecticut State Militia
- Website: www.ct.gov/mil

Reginald Beardsley De Lacour (November 8, 1886 – March 21, 1948) was the thirty-fourth Adjutant General of the State of Connecticut. From 1927 to 1935, he served as treasurer of the Veteran's Home commission and served on Governor Trumbull's advisory board on aviation from 1927 to 1931. He was a chairman of the Fairfield County board of County Commissioners during 1931 to 1935 and was a chairman of the Stratford Republican town committee for many years.

== Early life and education ==
He was born in Wichita, Kansas on November 8, 1886, to Margaret Starr Beardsley of Stratford, and J. Walter De Lacour, who was a Yale Law graduate of 1885. His parents moved to Stratford, Connecticut where Reginald attended the Stratford elementary. He graduated High School in 1904. Upon leaving school, he went to work in the Bridgeport Trust Company as a bookkeeper which position he held until 1906 when he decided he was ready for something else. From 1906 to 1908, he worked with engineering crews on tunnels under the American Bridge Company, Constructing bridges and steel buildings in New York and Florida from 1908 to 1910. He worked briefly in sales work, real estate, and insurance.

== Military career ==
Reginald B. De Lacour enlisted in the First Illinois Cavalry, Illinois National Guard on November 8, 1915. De Lacour served as a sergeant with the troops on the Mexican border from May to December 1916.

In 1917, he was commissioned First Lieutenant Infantry from the Plattsburgh Officers Training Camp and was ordered overseas. De Lacour went to France and was assigned to Machine Gun Company, 165 Infantry, 42nd Rainbow Division. He was wounded in action on July 15, 1918, near the Suippe river. He later rejoined his unit before the Battle of Saint-Mihiel and it was here he distinguished himself, that he was promoted to captain in the Argonne forest, in November 1918, for bravery under fire.

After the war ended, he went with the Army of Occupation into Germany until April 1, 1919. He returned to the United States at the end of the operations. He was mustered out of the Federal Service Camp Upton, New York, in May 1919. He was commissioned in the U.S. Army Reserve Corps and promoted to major, then lieutenant colonel, and finally a full colonel of Infantry. He was also colonel of the 304th Infantry, 76th division with headquarters in Hartford.

De Lacour's most important post was Connecticut Adjutant General in 1939 until 1947.

== Awards and honors ==
He received the Distinguished Service Cross, Silver Star Citation, Order of the Purple Heart, Legion of Valor, and the Conspicuous Service Cross of the State of New York.

== Personal life ==
His club affiliations include Army Legion of Valor, member of the Sons of the American Revolution, Connecticut Society of Colonial Wars, The Huguenot Society, he was a member of the First Congregational Church of Stratford, and also he was vice president of the Bridgeport Real State Board and director and secretary of the Union Cemetery association. He was also a freemason.

== Death and legacy ==
Reginald B. De Lacour died in Hartford, Connecticut on March 21, 1948.

Military offices
Preceded by William F. Ladd	Connecticut Adjutant General; 1939-1947	Succeeded by Frederick G. Reincke
