= E. Donald Walsh =

United States Army general (1917–1997)

General E. Donald Walsh
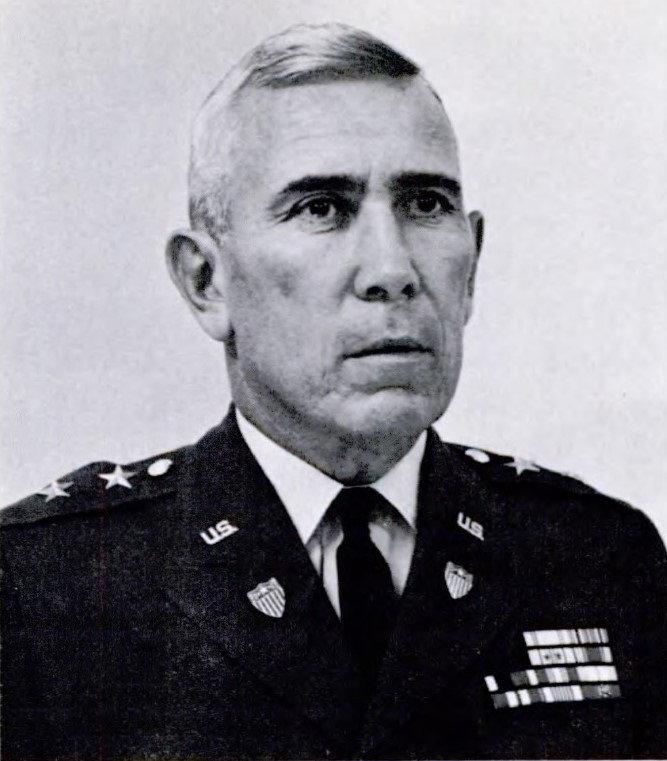
- Born: April 8, 1917; Waterbury, Connecticut, US
- Died: September 7, 1997 (aged 80); Viera, Florida, US
- Spouse: Jere Kerr
- Military career
- Allegiance: United States
- Branch: United States Army
- Rank: Major General
- Commands: Connecticut State Militia

Edward Donald Walsh born in Waterbury, Connecticut on April 8, 1917, was the thirty-sixth Adjutant General of the State of Connecticut.

== Early life and education ==
Walsh attended St. Peter and St. Paul School and graduated from Crosby High School in 1935. During his years at Trinity College in Hartford, he served as president of the student body, president of the college senate and president of his fraternity Alpha Chi Rho.

== Military career ==
Edward Donald Walsh had a distinguished military career. He was a senior at Trinity College when the National Guard unit of which he was a member was ordered to active duty. Walsh went with the 43rd division to the South Pacific as a Second Lieutenant. He served with the 102 Infantry at several stations in the South Pacific until his unit was attached to the Marine 3rd Amphibian Corp for the Okinawa invasion, one of the bloodiest battles of the whole Pacific operation. He was promoted to captain and after the Japanese surrendered, he took his unit to occupation duty in Korea. In 1950 another active duty came; Walsh commanded the Second Battalion of the 102nd Infantry in this country and in Germany after graduating from a course at the United States Army Command and General Staff College in 1951. He was promoted to United States Property and Fiscal Officer for Connecticut, a responsible, full-time Federal appointment, and remained in that position until he was appointed Connecticut Adjutant General by Governor Dempsey from 1963 to 1972. While in charge, the Connecticut National Guard soared to an outstanding efficient rating, because of his tough, but fair approach. He was able to bring the Connecticut National Guard and its personal to heights never seen before. Decorations include American Defense Medal, Asiatic-Pacific Campaign with two battle stars, American Campaign Medal, Army of Occupation Medal, World War II Victory Medal, Army Reserve Medal, State of Connecticut Long Service Medal, National Defense Medal, and Korean Emergency Medal. He was member of clubs like VFW, American Legion, National Guard Association of United States, Adjutant General's Association and Watertown Country Club.

== Personal life ==
Edward Donald Walsh married Emma ‘Jere’ Kerr of Allentown Pa. and they had two children.

Military offices
Preceded by Frederick G. Reincke	Connecticut Adjutant General; 1963-1972	Succeeded by John F. Freund
