= Andrew H. Embler =

General Andrew H. Embler
- Embler in 1914
- Born: June 29, 1834; Montgomery, New York, US
- Died: July 28, 1918 (aged 84); New Haven, Connecticut, US
- Spouse: Maria Elanora Dickerson
- Military career
- Allegiance: United States
- Branch: United States Army
- Rank: Major General
- Nickname: "The General"
- Units: Company H, 71st New York State Militia; Company E, 82nd New York Volunteer Infantry Regiment; Company D, 59th New York Volunteer Infantry Regiment
- Commands: Company E, 82nd New York Volunteer Infantry; Company D, 59th New York Volunteer Infantry
- American Civil War: Battle of Boydton Plank Road; Battle of First Bull Run; Battle of Antietam
- Awards: Medal of Honor
- Other work: Southern New England Telephone Company
- Website: www.ct.gov/mil

Andrew Henry Embler (June 29, 1834 – July 28, 1918) was an officer in the Union Army during the American Civil War. He received the country's highest award for bravery during combat, the Medal of Honor, for his action during the Battle of Boydton Plank Road in Virginia on October 27, 1864. He would later serve as the Connecticut Adjutant General for two years.

== Military career ==
Andrew H. Embler was born in Montgomery, New York, on June 29, 1834. He enlisted into the 71st New York State Militia eight days after the Battle of Fort Sumter. He was commissioned as a first lieutenant into Company H. He was wounded in the hip during the Battle of First Bull Run on July 21, 1861. After recovering from his injury, he was appointed as captain and commander of Company E, 82nd New York Volunteer Infantry on December 5, 1861. As the unit commander, he led the unit at the Battle of Antietam, being wounded again on September 17, 1862.

=== Battle of Boydton Plank Road ===
During the siege of Petersburg, Virginia, in October 1864, the Union Army sought to seize a critical supply line for the Confederate Army – Boydton Plank Road. Captain Embler was now commander of Company D of the 59th New York Volunteer Infantry, which was a key unit during the battle. Captain Embler led his unit as the spearhead of two regiments that attacked the Confederates' main body and allowed the Union to establish a barricade on the road. The Union Army, under Major General Winfield S. Hancock, would achieve a tactical victory over the Confederate Army before both sides would settle down for the winter. For these actions, Captain Embler would be awarded the Medal of Honor.

Captain Embler would continue to serve in the Union Army throughout the duration of the war and was present at Appomattox Court House in April 1865 to witness the surrender of the Confederate Army. For his service, he was brevetted to the rank of lieutenant colonel.

== Medal of Honor citation ==
The President of the United States of America, in the name of Congress, takes pleasure in presenting the Medal of Honor to Captain (Infantry) Andrew Henry Embler, United States Army, for extraordinary heroism on 27 October 1864, while serving with Company D, 59th New York Infantry, in action at Boydton Plank Road, Virginia. Captain Embler charged at the head of two regiments, which drove the enemy's main body, gained the crest of the hill near the Burgess house and forced a barricade on the Boydton road.

== After the War ==
Andrew returned to Montgomery, New York, after the war but would soon move to Connecticut to seek business opportunities. In 1878, he was one of the founders of the District Telephone Company of New Haven, which would become Southern New England Telephone. In 1877 he joined the First Company Governor's Foot Guard to which he served as the Major Commandant from February 28, 1881, to January 30, 1882. Now a respected businessman and war hero, Governor Morgan Bulkeley appointed him to the position of adjutant general on January 10, 1890, and the rank of major general.

== Personal life ==
Andrew married Maria Elanora Dickerson of Minisink Ford, New York. Around June 1918, General Embler attended a memorial service for members of the Old New Haven Blues who had fallen in France during World War I. It is suspected that he contracted pneumonia during this event and combined with weakening health, he died on July 28 at the age of 84.

Military offices
Preceded by Lucius A. Barbour	Connecticut Adjutant General; January 10, 1890 - 1892	Succeeded by Edward E. Bradley
