= Edward E. Bradley =

American politician in Connecticut (1845–1917)

General Edward E. Bradley
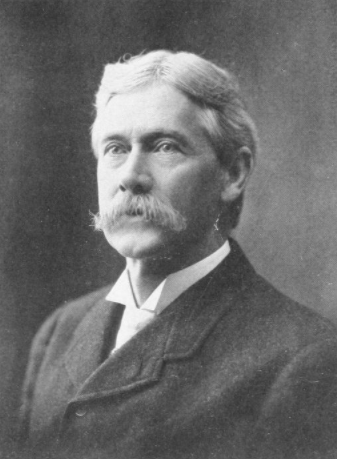
- Born: January 5, 1845; New Haven, CT
- Died: January 21, 1917 (aged 72); New Haven, CT
- Spouse: Mary E. Kimberly
- Military career
- Allegiance: United States
- Branch: United States Army
- Rank: Major General
- Commands: Connecticut State Militia
- Website: www.ct.gov/mil

Edward Elias Bradley (January 5, 1845 – January 21, 1917) was the twenty eighth Adjutant General of the State of Connecticut. Bradley served as president of the Boston Buckboard and Carriage Company. He also headed the News Publishing Company. Bradley during 1901 to 1903 was the president of the New Haven Chamber of Commerce. He was commissioner of the public parks of New Haven from 1888 to 1901, and in 1910 became the president of the parks commission. Bradley was president of the Governor’s staff Association of Connecticut from 1903 to 1911. Bradley was president of the Defender Monument Association, which raised funds for the defenders monument to commemorate the successful defense of the West River. He was also the president of the Young’s Men Institute. In 1883, Bradley represented the town of Orange, Connecticut in the general assembly. Bradley was a Democrat and introduced and advocated the constitutional amendment for biennial sessions of the Legislature, which was accepted. He was the director of New Haven National Bank and was the director of Quinnipiac Fire Insurance.

== Military career ==
Bradley enlisted in the New Haven Grays in 1861 for a term of 90 days and became corporal in 1862, lieutenant of Company F Second Regiment Connecticut National Guard in 1863, captain from 1865 to 1867, lieutenant colonel of the Second Regiment in 1868, and colonel of the same from 1869 to 1871. In 1877, he was appointed as Paymaster General by Governor Richard D. Hubbard and held the rank of brigadier general, and, in 1893, Governor Luzon B. Morris appointed him as Connecticut Adjutant General. His Civil War unit fought in nearly 20 battles and including the First Battle of Bull Run during which they helped turn back the Confederate forces during a what was largely a mismanaged Union retreat.

== Personal life ==
Edward E. Bradley was born in New Haven, Connecticut on January 5, 1845, to Isaac and Abigail Knowles Hervey Bradley. He traces his ancestry back to William Bradley, an officer in Oliver Cromwell's army who emigrated to this country and settled in New Haven in 1644. He was educated in the Lancasterian Public School in New Haven, Brown's Academy in West Haven, and the Robbins Commercial School in New Haven where he graduated in 186o. Starting on April 5, 1860, he worked at the Haven Wheel Company as a junior bookkeeper and shortly thereafter became the head bookkeeper. The Civil War called him into service and he enlisted in the New Haven Grays in 1861 for a term of 90 days. After the war, he was elected Secretary and Treasurer in the New Haven Wheel company where he remained in those positions until he was elected as president of the company on July 1, 1877. He was also held positions in the Boston Buckboard and Carriage Company, Charles W. Scranton Company of New Haven, the News Publishing Company of New Haven, Fort Bascom Cattle Raising Company of New Haven (had a large ranch in New Mexico as of 1884), the New Mexico Land and Irrigation Company, the New Haven County National Bank, the New Citizens Trust Company of New Haven, the Connecticut Local Board of the New York Life Insurance Company, the New Haven Chamber of Commerce, the Young Men's Institute of New Haven, the New Haven Colony Historical Society, the Board of Burgesses of the borough of West Haven, the Union School District Committee of the Town of Orange, served twice as a member of the House of Representatives in 1882 and 1883, one term as a member of the Senate, on the board of the New Haven public park commissioners and was a Democratic candidate for lieutenant governor.

He was a member of the Protestant Episcopal Church, St. Paul's Church, and served as Director of the Missionary Society of Connecticut and as a Trustee of the Episcopal Academy of Connecticut at Cheshire. He married Mary Elizabeth Kimberly of West Haven on April 26, 1871, with whom he had three daughters: Edith Mary, Bertha Kimberly, and Mabel Louise and Bradley.

Edward E. Bradley died from heart disease at his home in New Haven on January 21, 1917.

Military offices
Preceded by Andrew H. Embler	Connecticut Adjutant General; 1893–1894	Succeeded by Charles P. Graham
