= Lucius A. Barbour =

General Lucius A. Barbour
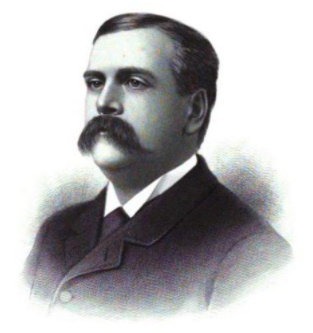
- Born: January 26, 1846; Madison, Indiana
- Died: November 6, 1922 (aged 76); Hartford, CT
- Spouse: Harriet E. Barnes (1849–1899, her death)
- Military career
- Allegiance: United States
- Branch: United States Army
- Rank: Major General
- Commands: Connecticut State Militia
- Website: www.ct.gov/mil

Signature
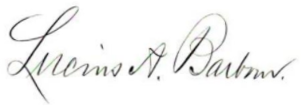

Lucius Albert Barbour (January 26, 1846, in Madison, Indiana – November 6, 1922) was the twenty-six Adjutant General of the State of Connecticut. Barbour was a teller in the Charter Oak Bank. Barbour political affiliations were with the Republican Party. He was a member of the House of Representatives in 1879; he served as the colleague of the late Hon. Henry C. Robinson. In 1884 Barbour became treasurer and president of the Willimantic Linen Co. He was part of the first Congregational Church of Hartford. He was a member of the Hartford Club, Acorn Club of Connecticut, and the automobile club of Hartford. Barbour was identified with Battle Flag Day, being a member of the legislative committee which had the arrangements in charge. Barbour was one of the prominent men of Connecticut. His descendants on both sides of the families have been conspicuous in the history of New England for over two and a half centuries.

== Military career ==
Barbour enlisted on September 9, 1865, becoming a private in the Hartford City Guard (Battery D), he was attached to the First Regiment of the National Guard. He rapidly rose from private because of his unusual aptitude and genuine patriotism. He was already a first-lieutenant when he resigned for a two-year tour of travel in Europe. On February 1, 1875, he became major. On December 29, 1876, he was commissioned lieutenant-colonel and on June 26, 1878, was placed in command of the regiment. He was colonel when the command took its memorable trip to Yorktown in 1881 to help celebrate the centennial of Cornwallis's surrender. Barbour won a national reputation by splendid efficiency and discipline. Barbour resigned on November 12, 1884, but did not end his military interest. On January 10, 1889, Barbour was appointed Connecticut Adjutant General to the staff of Governor Morgan G. Bulkeley. Barbour retired on May 9, 1911. Barbour belonged to the Military Order of Foreign Wars, the Society of Colonial Wars, and Sons of the American Revolution.

== Personal life ==
Barbour's parents were Lucius and Harriet Louise (Day) Barbour. When he was an infant they moved to Hartford, Connecticut. On February 8, 1877, Barbour married Harriet E. Barnes daughter of Alfred Smith Barnes, who is known for publishing house A.S. Barnes & Co. of New York City. Their children are Lucius Barnes and Harriet Burr. Mrs. Barbour died in Hartford Connecticut on November 8, 1899. General Barbour died from poor health on November 6, 1922, at his home at 130 Washington Street in Hartford, Connecticut.

Military offices
Preceded by Frederick E. Camp	Connecticut Adjutant General; 1889–1890	Succeeded by Andrew H. Embler
