= Charles P. Graham =

General Charles P. Graham
- Born: June 6, 1839; Utica, New York
- Died: November 1, 1904 (aged 65); Middletown, Connecticut
- Military career
- Allegiance: United States
- Branch: United States Army
- Rank: Major General
- Commands: Connecticut State Militia
- Website: www.ct.gov/mil

Charles P. Graham (June 6, 1839 – November 1, 1904) was born in Utica, New York, and was the twenty ninth Adjutant General of the State of Connecticut. Graham was one of the original dental commissioners of the state being first appointed in 1893. In 1896 he served as president of the State Dental Society. Graham was a prominent member of the Universalist Church. He practiced dentistry for 36 years.

== Military career ==
In December 8, 1871, Graham joined the Middletown company, H, of the Second Regiment, as a private. A month later he was first sergeant. Graham was elected first lieutenant and eight months later on April 21, 1873, became captain. On September 3, 1875, he was appointed to second regiment and then on July 5, 1878, succeeded Stephen R. Smith a colonel. On January 28, 1885, he became brigadier-general. In 1895 Charles P. Graham became Connecticut Adjutant General until 1896.

== Personal life ==
Charles P. Graham was the son of George W. Graham. He moved to Middletown, Connecticut, in 1857. Graham got married and a daughter who was killed in the Park Central disaster in Hartford. On November 1, 1904, General Charles P. Graham killed himself. He was survived by his wife; a daughter, Mrs. Eugene P. Pelton of Essex. He had a brother, George T. Graham of Hartford, and three sisters, Mrs. Edwin A. Sawyer of Hartford, Mrs. A.O. Carter of Niantic and Mrs. Charles Barlett of New Haven.

Military offices
Preceded by Edward E. Bradley	Connecticut Adjutant General; 1895–1896	Succeeded by George Haven
