= Louis N. Van Keuren =

General Louis Nelson Van Keuren
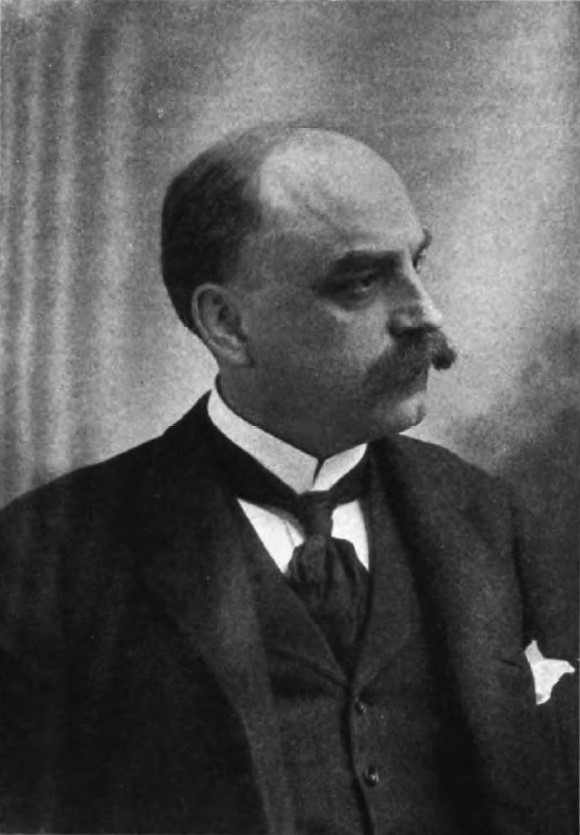
- Louis Nelson Van Keuren
- Born: April 17, 1850; Wurtsborough, NY
- Died: September 22, 1914 (aged 64); Bridgeport, CT
- Spouse: Mary T. Dunham
- Military career
- Allegiance: United States
- Branch: United States Army
- Rank: Major General
- Commands: Connecticut State Militia
- Website: www.ct.gov/mil

Louis Nelson Van Keuren, born in Wurtsborough, New York on April 17, 1850, was the thirty-first Adjutant General of the State of Connecticut. Van Keuren worked as a clerk in a book store in Bridgeport, Connecticut. Before Van Keuren was 20 years old he became a Cashier and Head Accountant in Pacific Iron Works, Bridgeport. He was also a secretary and treasurer for seven years for Bridgeport Gas Light Company. Keuren for ten years was a general manager of the banking house of T.L. Watson & Co of Bridgeport. Van Keuren was president of the board of Appointment and Taxation of Bridgeport. In 1899 he was offered the position of secretary and treasurer by The Colonial Trust Company.

== Military career ==
Louis Nelson Van Keuren was captain and adjutant of the old Fourth Regiment from 1885 to 1890. He then became lieutenant colonel and assistant brigade adjutant from 1890-1892. From 1897-1898 Van Keuren was brigade general and quartermaster general. Van Keuren became Connecticut Adjutant General from 1899 to 1900. He was also Quartermaster during the Spanish–American War.

== Personal life ==
Louis Nelson Van Keuren parents were John A. and Laura Van Keuren. Louis Nelson Van Keuren was educated at the common schools, finishing his studies at the High School, Bridgeport, Connecticut. Van Keuren married Mary T. Dunham the daughter of Hon. James E. Dunham of Bridgeport. Mary and Louis had one child, a son, Harold How Van Keuren. Louis Nelson Van Keuren was involved in a case that took him to court; but there were no further complications. Van Keuren was a member and was a former president of the Seaside Club. He was a thirty two second degree mason. He was a member of the Army and Navy Club, and the New York Athletic Club. On September 22, 1914 Louis Nelson Van Keuren died of uremic poisoning, following a sicknesses of several weeks of rheumatism.

Military offices
Preceded by George Haven	Connecticut Adjutant General; 1899–1900	Succeeded by George M. Cole
