= Isabel Mallon =

American writer

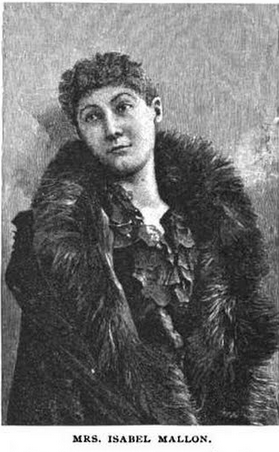
Isabel Mallon, from an 1891 publication.

Isabel Allerdice Mallon (July 13, 1857 – December 27, 1898) was an American writer, best known for columns written in the 1890s as "Ruth Ashmore" for the Ladies' Home Journal, and her syndicated newspaper column as "Bab's Babble".

== Biography ==
Mallon, as Isabel Sloan, was born in Baltimore, Maryland in 1857. When her husband William Mallon became ill (and later died), she pursued journalism for income, starting by writing about fashion. She started the "Bab's Babble" gossip column for newspaper syndication, starting with the New York Star, in 1888.

The "Ruth Ashmore" column was conceived of by Edward W. Bok, who after taking over the Journal in 1889, sought a motherly columnist who could provide advice to young girls. Unable to find one, he penned a sample column of "Side Talk with Girls" as "Ruth Ashmead" to show a female writer a demonstration of what he was looking for. Bok mislaid the draft copy, and his staff found it and urged that it be run in the magazine, as the "best stuff for girls they have ever read." After the first column appeared in print (with Ashmead changed to Ashmore) in January 1890, hundreds of letters poured in, and Bok convinced Mallon to take the reins of the column.

The Ruth Ashmore advice book Side Talks With Girls was published in 1895, and The Business Girl was published in 1898.

Mallon died from pneumonia in New York City on December 27, 1898. Although Bok recalled in his autobiography that Mallon wrote as Ashmore for 16 years, it appears to have been closer to nine.
