= George M. Cole =

United States Army general

General George M. Cole
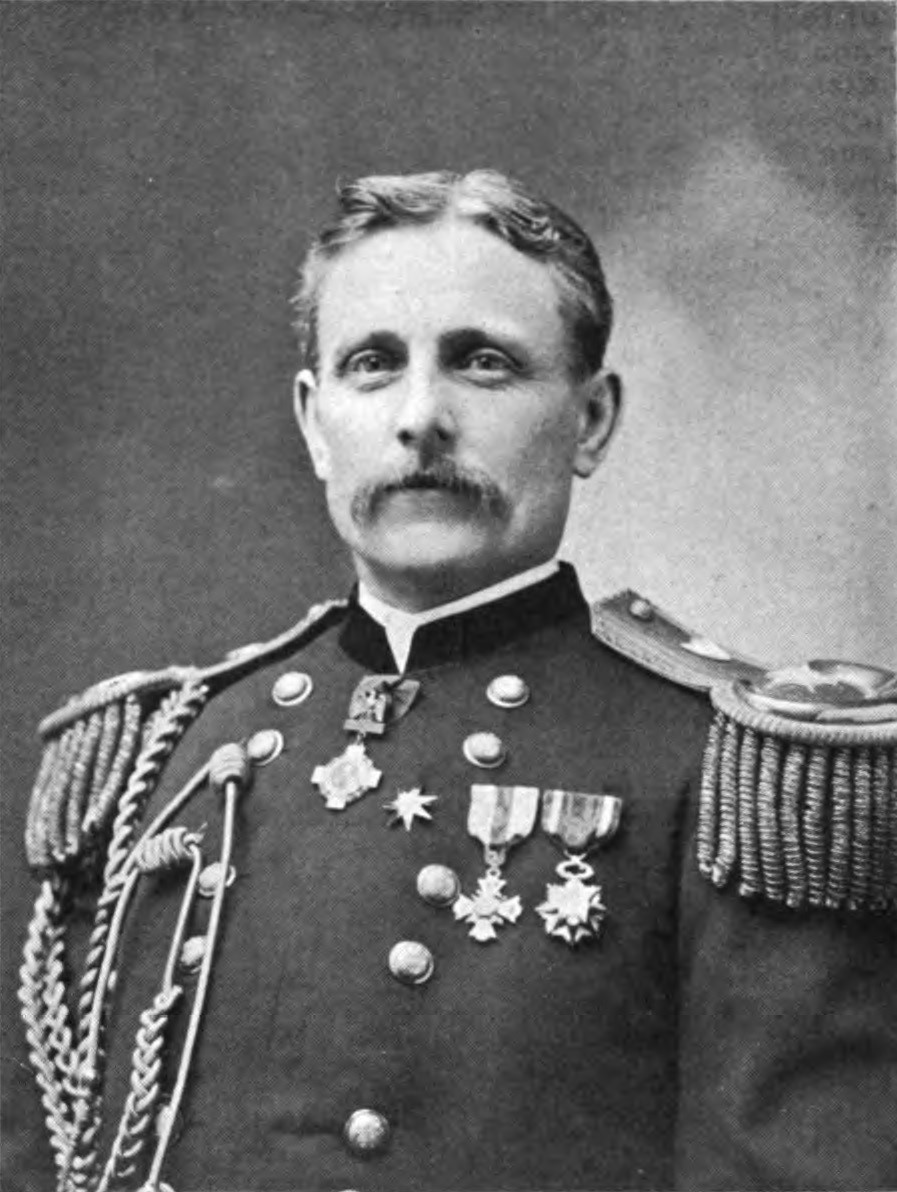
- George M. Cole
- Born: August 20, 1853; Portsmouth, England
- Died: November 23, 1933 (aged 80); West Hartford, Connecticut
- Spouse: Emily Judson Beckwith
- Military career
- Allegiance: United States
- Branch: United States Army
- Rank: Major General
- Commands: Connecticut State Militia
- Website: www.ct.gov/mil

George Malpas Cole (August 20, 1853 – November 23, 1933), was the thirty-second Adjutant General of the State of Connecticut. He was the son of George Cole and Jane A. Malpas. Born in Portsmouth, England, his family moved to Massachusetts where his father was a civil engineer. Cole was educated in public and private schools. Cole was also tutored by his father, where he became an assistant to his father. Cole would later become associated with a wholesale and a grain business in New London.

== Military career ==
Cole enlisted in the Massachusetts National Guard in 1875 and the Indiana National Guard in 1882. On November 10, 1884, George enlisted in the Connecticut National Guard. Cole started off his military career in Connecticut in the Third Machine Gun Platoon of the Third Infantry Regiment of the Connecticut National Guard. On April 29, 1885, Cole became a sergeant and then commissary sergeant of the Third Infantry on August 6, 1886. Cole was made first lieutenant. Then paymaster on January 7, 1887, and was promoted to captain, in command of Company 1 Third Infantry on May 8, 1888. On January 20, 1891, he resigned from that commission. On August 15, 1891, he again became captain and adjutant of the Third Infantry. On May 30, 1892, he became lieutenant colonel and brigade adjutant. He was commissioned lieutenant colonel of the Third Infantry on August 25, 1893. On July 21, 1898, was placed on the retired list, to enable him to accept appointment as lieutenant colonel of the Fourth United States Volunteer Infantry during the Spanish–American War. George M. Cole became Connecticut Adjutant General on January 9, 1901, by Governor George P. McLean. George Cole served for 28 years, where he saw service on the Mexican border and on the battlefields of France during World War I. During World War I, he directed the operation of the selective service laws in Connecticut and directed the district and local division draft boards acting in the name of the governor. On May 24, 1917, General Cole again went into Federal Service when he was named Disbursing Agent and Officer of the United States. He severed this capacity until May 19, 1919. George Cole’s responsibilities involved the mobilization and mustering into Federal service of State troops and the operation of the draft. Cole was also active in recruiting campaigns to bring the guard units up to strength and he was a member of the State Department of Historical Records. The General Assembly of 1929 passed a special act authorizing the retirement of Brigadier General George M. Cole with the grade of major general. During Cole’s time many significant developments took place in Connecticut National Guard including the addition of an air wing, tremendous war time expansion and mechanization. General Cole was associated with many military organizations. General Cole was a companion and a former commander of Connecticut Commandery Military Order at Foreign Wars. He was formerly a commander of Connecticut Commandery, Naval and Military Order of the Spanish–American War, and was the organizer and commander of the first camp of United States Spanish War Veterans in Connecticut. He was first Department Commander. Cole was a member of the Military Order of The World War, The Army and Navy Club of Washington. General Cole was a member of Brainard Lodge.

== Personal life ==
Cole married Miss Emily Judson Beckwith of New London in November, 1877. They had four children; Lieutenant Colonel George E. Cole, Connecticut National Guard of West Hartford, Major Donald M. Cole, and Coast Artillery Corps stationed at Fort H.O Wright, Fishers Island N.Y; Miss Clara B. Cole of West Hartford and Mrs. Emily Beckwith Nye of Hartford. On November 23, 1933, Major General Cole died at the age of 80 in his home in West Hartford of arteriosclerosis. General Cole was associated with many military organizations. General Cole was a companion and a former commander of Connecticut Commandery Military Order at Foreign Wars. He was formerly a commander of Connecticut Commandery, Naval and Military Order of the Spanish–American War, and was the organizer and commander of the first camp of United States Spanish War Veterans in Connecticut. He was first Department Commander.

Military offices
| Preceded by Louis N. VanKeuren | Connecticut Adjutant General; 1901–1929 | Succeeded by William F. Ladd |
