= William Ladd Taylor =

American illustrator (1854–1926)

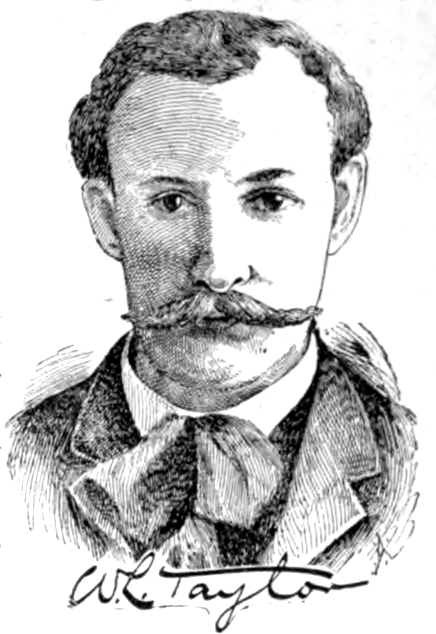
- Born: December 10, 1854; Grafton, Massachusetts
- Died: 1926 (aged 71–72)
- Occupation: Illustrator
- Spouse: Mary Alice Fitz (m. 1888)

William Ladd Taylor (1854-1926) was an American illustrator.

== Biography ==
William Ladd Taylor was born at Grafton, Massachusetts on December 10, 1854. He studied art in Boston and New York, and in Paris under Boulanger and Lefebvre in 1884–85. His drawings, many of which first appeared in magazines, are essentially narrative in type and show keen understanding of human nature, with careful, historical accuracy. He published several volumes of his work which contained illustrations of the nineteenth century in New England, the pioneer West, Longfellow, the Psalms, old songs, American life, American literature, and the Old Testament.

He married Mary Alice Fitz in 1888.

His work was featured in the magazine the Ladies Home Journal, from 1895; the office also exhibited his oils and water-colours and sold reproductions of these.

== Gallery ==
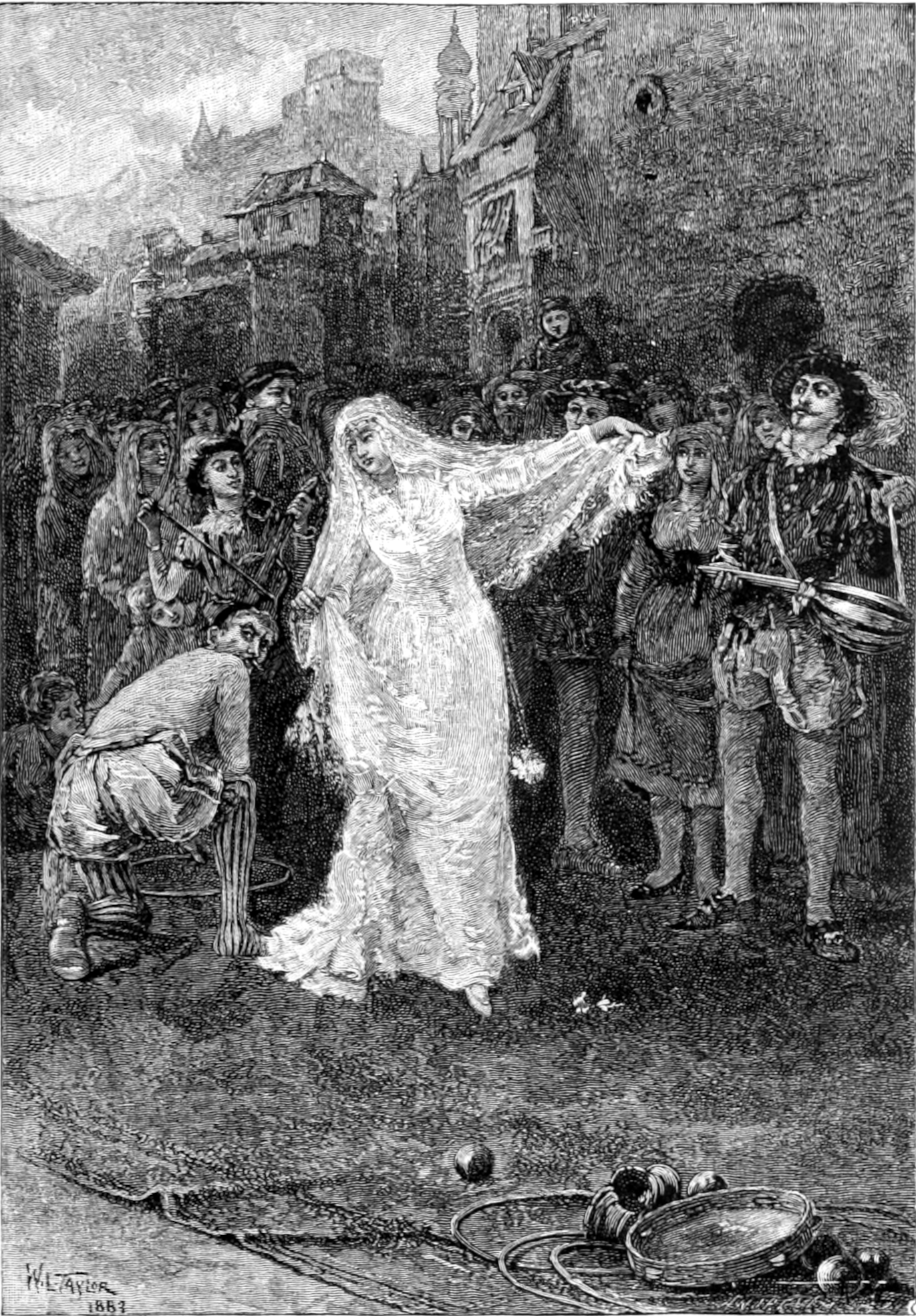
Illustration from the poems of George Eliot

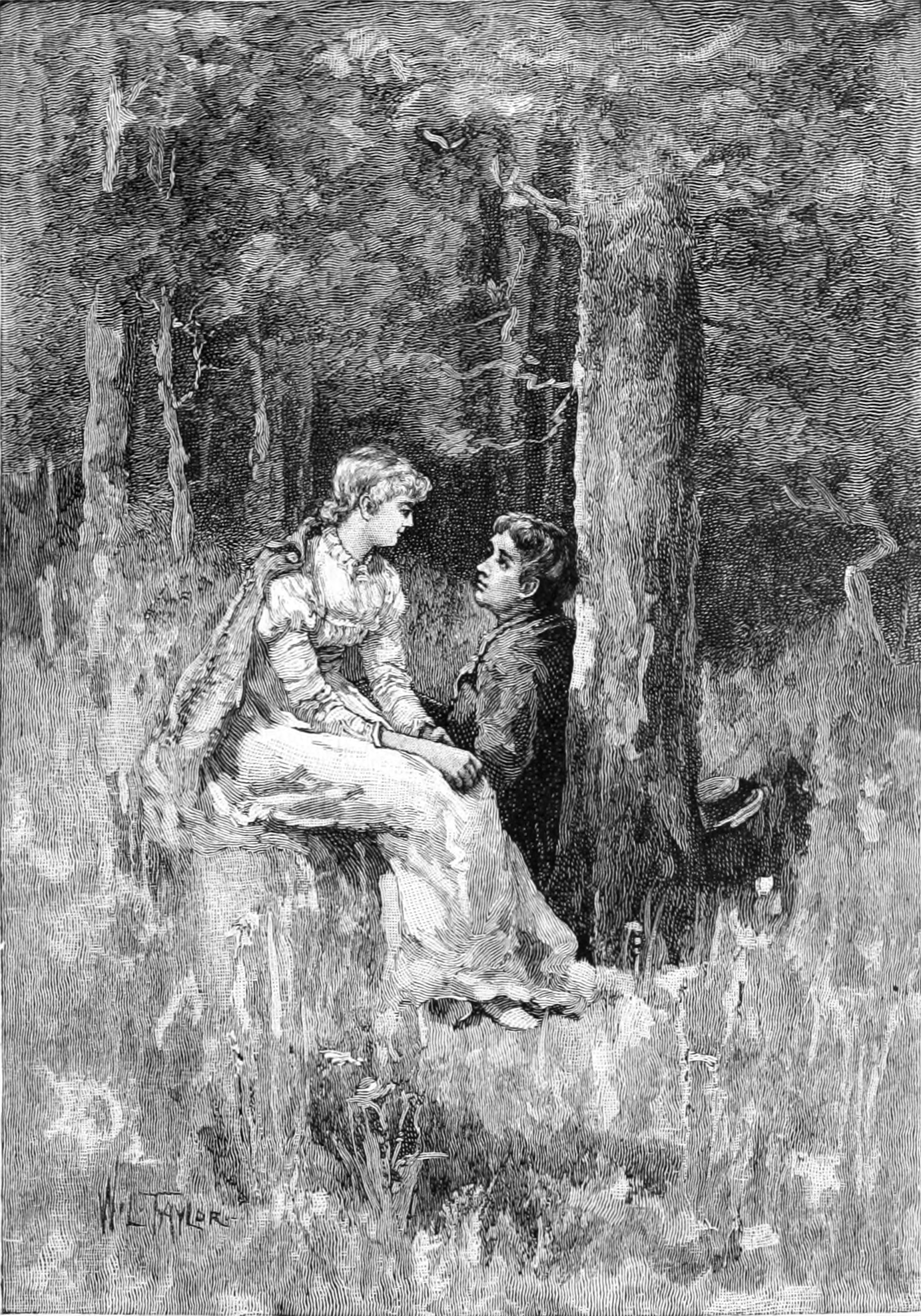
An illustration from a collection of poetry

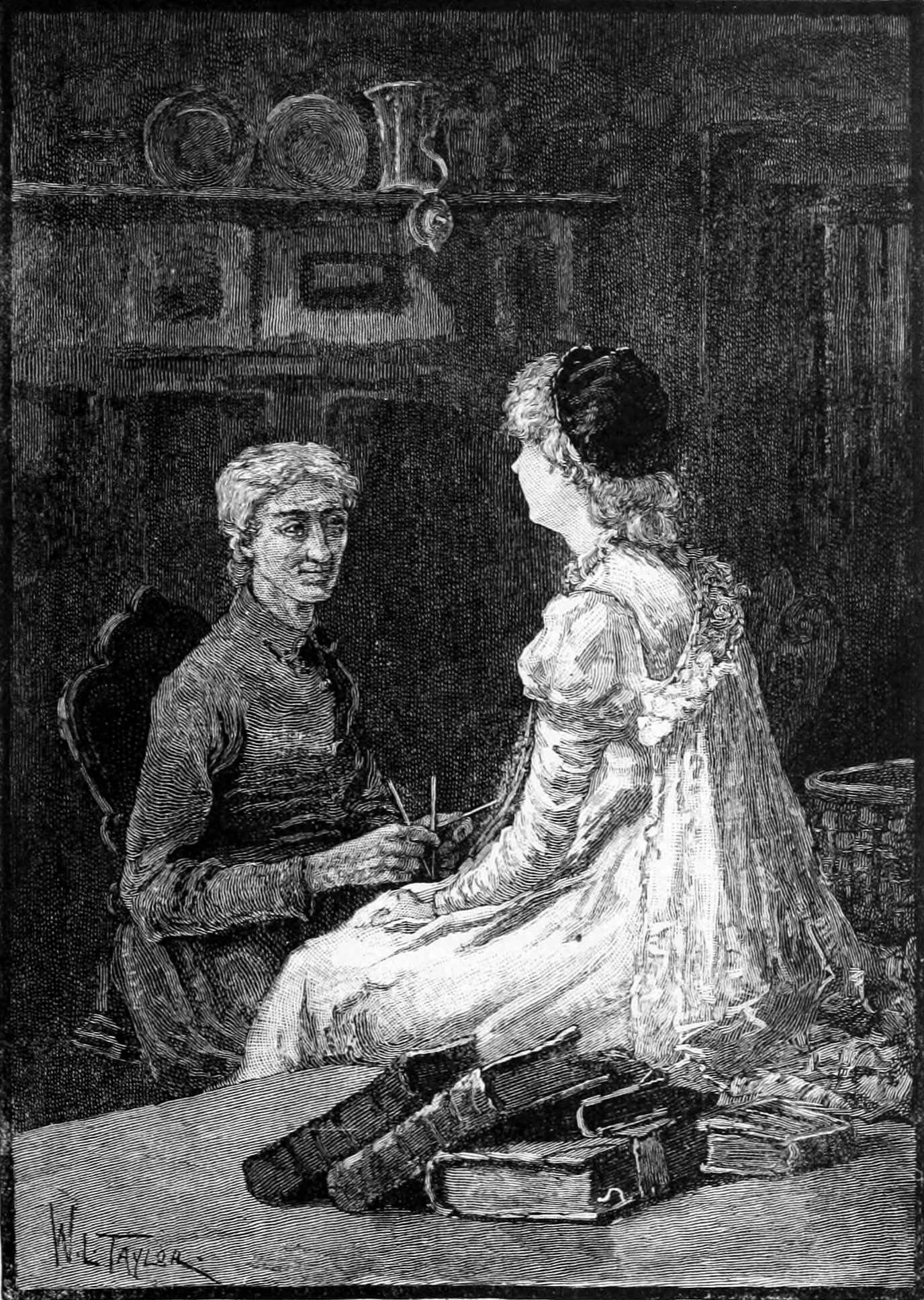
Illustration, 1884

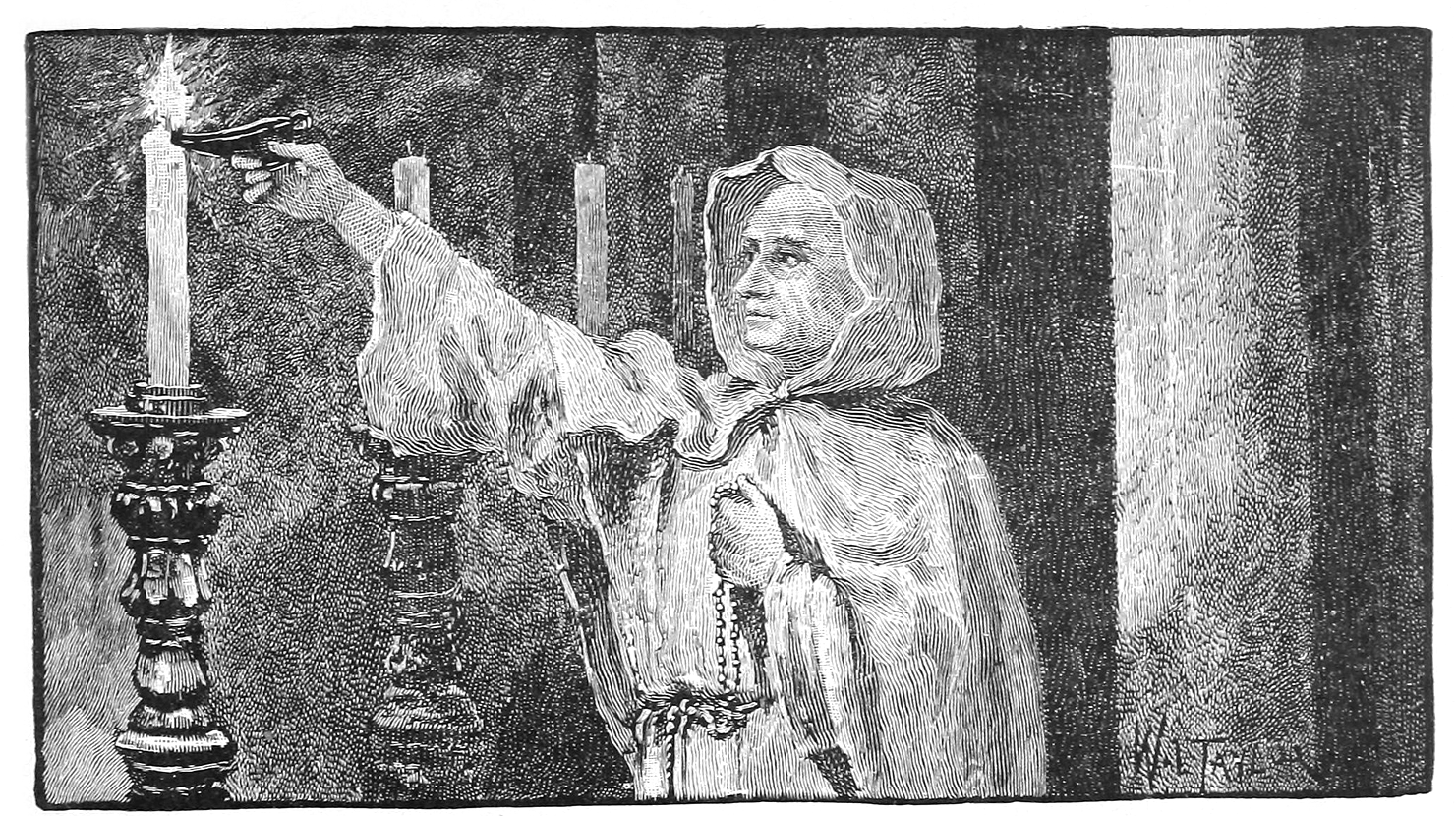
The Taper by W. L. Taylor
