= Frederick G. Reincke =

United States Army general

General Frederick G. Reincke
- Born: November 1, 1899; Winsted, Connecticut, US
- Died: September 5, 1981 (aged 81); St. Petersburg, Florida, US
- Spouse: Marjorie C. Reincke
- Military career
- Allegiance: United States
- Branch: US Army
- Rank: Lieutenant General (CT); Major General (USAR)
- Commands: Connecticut State Militia
- Website: www.ct.gov/mil

Frederick Gates Reincke (born in Winsted, Connecticut, on November 1, 1899) was the thirty-fifth Adjutant General of the State of Connecticut. He went to public schools in Winsted. Reincke was appointed Wethersfield prison warder in 1963. That same year he supervised all the transferred inmates from the Wethersfield prison to the new prison in Somers. His decorations were Legion of Merit, Bronze Star Medal, commendation ribbon, American Defense Service Medal, American Campaign, Asiatic Pacific Campaign and Combat Infantryman badge.

== Military career ==
Reincke's military career began in 1917 when he enlisted as an electrician in the Navy. He was a Navy veteran of World War I and an Army veteran of World War II. Reincke left the Naval Reserve Force in 1921 and joined the Connecticut National Guard. He was commissioned as a second lieutenant of infantry on March 18, 1922 and called to active duty as a lieutenant colonel on February 24, 1941. Reincke commanded troops in many battles in the South Pacific during World War II before contracting malaria and returning to the United States. He left the Army with the rank of colonel and was awarded the Legion of Merit for his service as an Army battalion commander with the 169th Infantry. After World War II, Reincke became commanding general of the 169th Connecticut National Guard Infantry and served in 1947 as Hartford County Sheriff. In 1956, Reincke directed the National Guard troops who put down a riot at the Old State in Wethersfield. Reincke was Connecticut Adjutant General for 15 years from 1948 to 1962. He was confirmed as a United States Army Reserve brigadier general on March 10, 1949 and as a major general on August 18, 1954. He was promoted to lieutenant general by the state of Connecticut upon retirement.

== Personal life ==
Reincke married Marjorie E. Coughlin and they had a daughter Gloria Sparaco. In December 1968, Reincke and his wife were assaulted and kidnapped by a convicted murderer that had been taken into the Reinckes' home as a trustee. They both survived the attack. Reincke died at the age of 81 in his home in St. Petersburg, Florida on September 5, 1981. Reincke and his wife were buried at Rose Hill Memorial Park in Rocky Hill, Connecticut.

Military offices
Preceded by Reginald B. DeLacour	Connecticut Adjutant General; 1948–1962	Succeeded by E. Donald Walsh
