= Ladies' Home Journal =

American magazine (1883–2016)

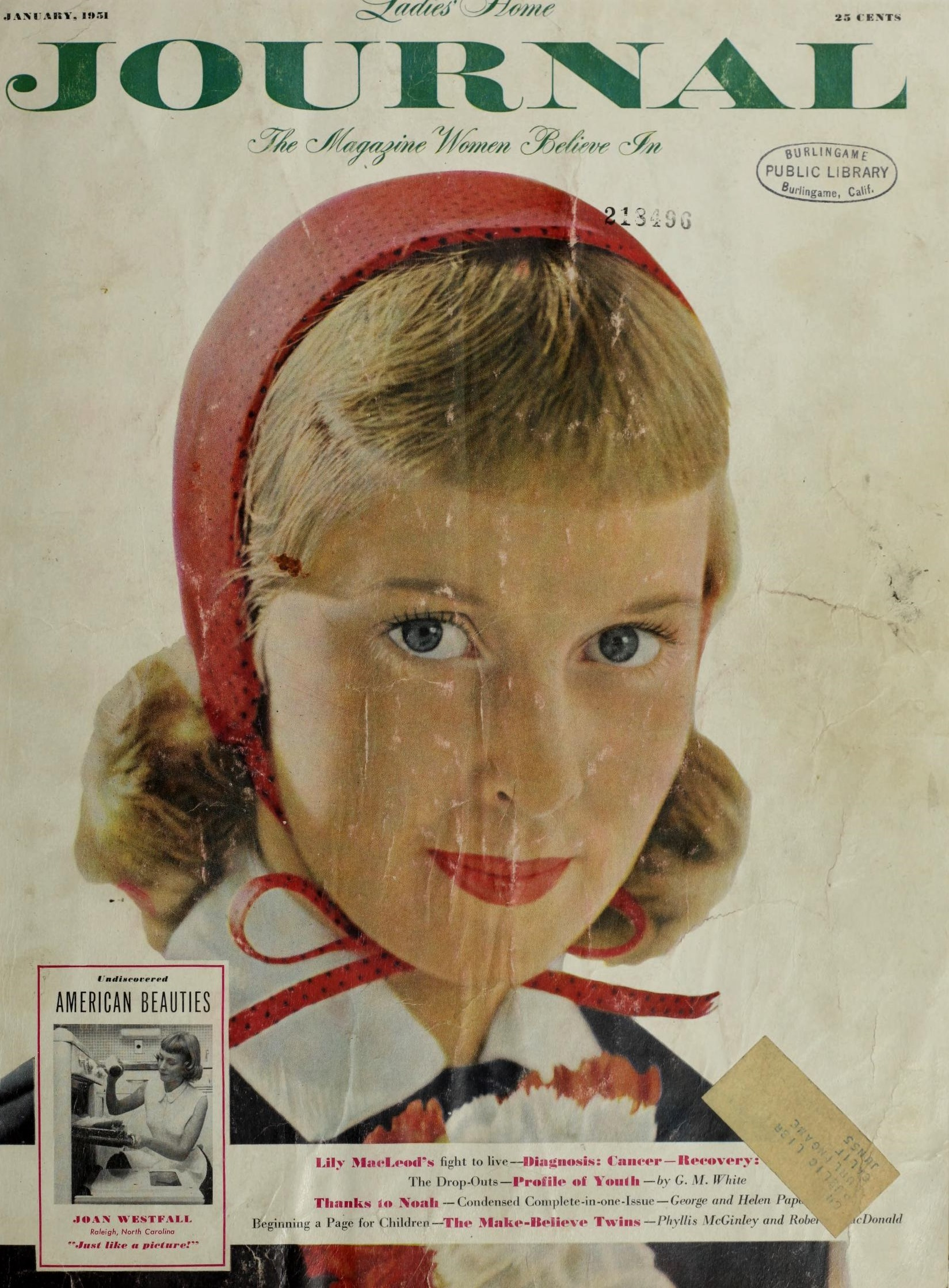
- January 1951 cover
- Editor-in-chief: Sally Lee
- Categories: Women's interest, lifestyle
- Frequency: 11 issues/year (1883–1910; 1911–2014); 24 issues a year (c. 1910–1911); Quarterly (2014–2016)
- Publisher: Meredith Corporation
- Total circulation: 3,267,239 (2011)
- Founded: 1883; 143 years ago
- Final issue: 2016; 10 years ago
- Country: US
- Based in: Des Moines, Iowa
- Language: English
- ISSN: 0023-7124

Ladies' Home Journal was an American magazine that ran until 2016 and was last published by the Meredith Corporation. It was first published on February 16, 1883, and eventually became one of the leading women's magazines of the 20th century in the United States. In 1891, it was published in Philadelphia by the Curtis Publishing Company. In 1903, it was the first American magazine to reach one million subscribers.

In the late 20th century, the rise of television caused sales of the magazine to decline as the publishing company struggled. On April 24, 2014, Meredith announced it would stop publishing the magazine as a monthly with the July issue, stating it was "transitioning Ladies' Home Journal to a special interest publication". It became available quarterly on newsstands only, though its website remained in operation. The last issue was published in 2016.

Ladies' Home Journal was one of the Seven Sisters. The name was derived from the Greek myth of the "seven sisters", also known as the Pleiades.

== Early history ==
1891 edition of Ladies' Home Journal

The Ladies' Home Journal was developed from a double-page supplement in the American newspaper Tribune and Farmer titled Women at Home. Women at Home, first added as an afterthought to fill up space, it was written by the owner Mr. C. Curtis. When Louisa Knapp Curtis, wife of the paper's publisher, Cyrus H. K. Curtis, was shown this first feature in 1883 she told her husband she could do better. He handed over the supplement to his wife to manage. After a year, it became an independent publication, with Knapp as editor for the first six years. Its original name was The Ladies' Home Journal and Practical Housekeeper, but Knapp dropped the last three words in 1886.

=== Edward William Bok ===
Knapp was succeeded by Edward William Bok as LHJ editor in late 1889. Knapp remained involved with the magazine's management, and she also wrote a column for each issue. In 1892, LHJ became the first magazine to refuse patent medicine advertisements. In 1896, Bok became Louisa Knapp's son-in-law when he married her daughter, Mary Louise Curtis. LHJ reached a subscribed circulation of more than one million copies by 1903, the first American magazine to do so. Bok served until 1919. The feature he introduced was the "Ruth Ashmore advice column", written by Isabel Mallon. In the 20th century, the magazine published the work of muckrakers and social reformers such as Jane Addams. In 1901, it published two articles about the early architectural designs of Frank Lloyd Wright. The December 1909 issue included a comic strip which was the first appearance of Kewpie, created by Rose O'Neill.

Bok introduced business practices of low subscription rates and inclusion of advertising to offset costs. Some argue that women's magazines, like the Ladies' Home Journal, pioneered the strategies "magazine revolution".

Edward Bok authored more than twenty articles opposed to women's suffrage which threatened his "vision of the woman at home, living the simple life". He opposed the concept of women working outside the home, women's clubs, and education for women. He wrote that feminism would lead women to divorce, ill health, and even death. Bok solicited articles against women's rights from former presidents Grover Cleveland and Theodore Roosevelt (though Roosevelt would later become a supporter of women's suffrage). Bok viewed suffragists as traitors to their sex, saying that "there is no greater enemy of woman than woman herself."

== Later history ==
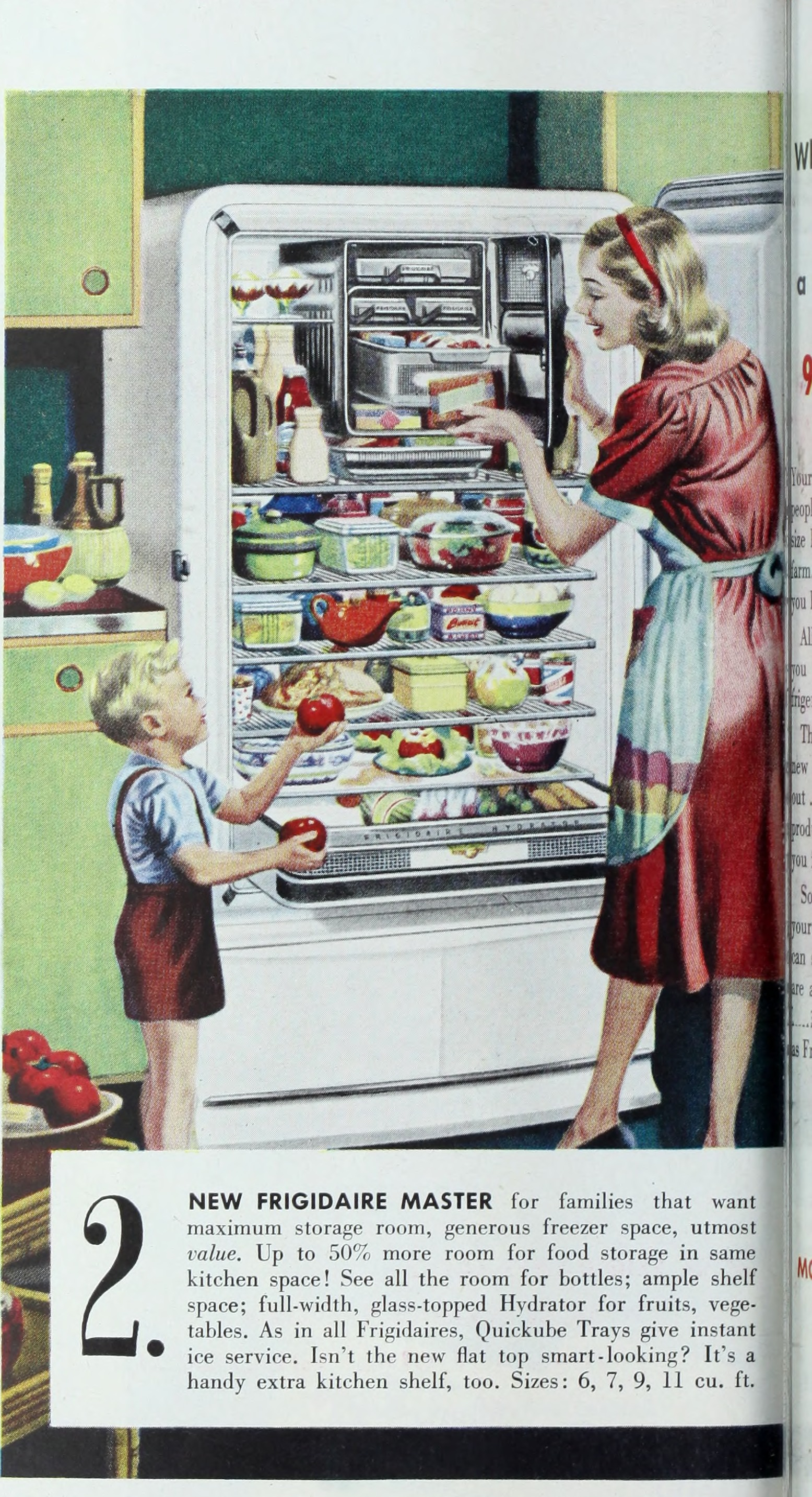
A refrigerator advertisement, 1948

During World War II, the Ladies' Home Journal was a venue for the government to place articles intended for homemakers. The annual subscription price paid for the production of the magazine and its mailing. The profits came from heavy advertising, pitched to families with above-average incomes of $1,000 to $3,000 in 1900. In the 1910s, it carried about a third of the advertising in all women's magazines. By 1929, it had nearly twice as much advertising as any other publication except for the Saturday Evening Post, which was also published by the Curtis family. The Ladies' Home Journal was sold to 2 million subscribers in the mid-1920s, grew a little during the depression years, and surged again during post-World War II. In 1955, each issue sold 4.6 million copies, and there were approximately 11 million readers.

=== Seven Sisters ===
The Journal, along with its major rivals, Better Homes and Gardens, Family Circle, Good Housekeeping, McCall's, Redbook and Woman's Day, were known as the Seven Sisters, after the women's colleges in the Northeast. For decades, the Journal had the most circulation of the Seven Sisters, but it fell behind McCall's in 1961. In 1968, its circulation was 6.8 million, compared to McCall's 8.5 million. That year, Curtis Publishing sold the Ladies' Home Journal and the magazine The American Home to Downe Communications for $5.4 million in stock. Between 1969 and 1974, Downe was acquired by Charter Company. In 1982, it sold the magazine to Family Media Inc., publishers of Health magazine.

=== Protest ===
In March 1970, feminists including Susan Brownmiller held an 11-hour sit-in at the Ladies' Home Journal's office, with some of them sitting on the desk of editor John Mack Carter and asking him to resign and be replaced by a woman editor. Carter declined to resign; he was allowed to produce a section of the magazine that August. Other activists continued the protests.

=== Redesign and circulations ===
In 1986, the Meredith Corporation acquired the magazine from Family Media for $96 million. In 1998, the Journal's circulation had dropped to 4.5 million. The magazine debuted an extensive visual and editorial redesign in its March 2012 issue. Photographer Brigitte Lacombe was hired to shoot cover photos, with Kate Winslet appearing on the first revamped issue. The Journal announced that portions of its editorial content would be crowdsourced from readers, who would be fairly compensated for their work.

In 2014, the magazine made the decision to end monthly publication and relaunch it quarterly. At the same time, the headquarters of the magazine moved from New York City to Des Moines, Iowa. Meredith offered its subscribers the chance to transfer their subscriptions to Meredith's sister publications. The magazine had a readership of 3.2 million in 2016. Also in 2016, Meredith partnered with Grand Editorial to produce Ladies' Home Journal. Only one issue was created.

== Features ==
Ladies' Home Journal issue from January 1889

The American cooking teacher Sarah Tyson Rorer served as LHJ's first food editor from 1897 to 1911, when she moved to Good Housekeeping. In 1936, Mary Cookman, wife of New York Post editor Joseph Cookman, began working at the Ladies' Home Journal. In time, she was named its Executive Editor, and she remained with LHJ until 1963.

In 1946, the Journal adopted the slogan "Never underestimate the power of a woman", which it continues to use today.

The magazine's trademark feature is "Can This Marriage Be Saved?" In this popular column, each person of a couple in a troubled marriage explains their view of the problem, a marriage counselor explains the solutions offered in counseling, and the outcome is published. It was written for 30 years, starting in 1953, by Dorothy D. MacKaye under the name of Dorothy Cameron Disney. MacKaye co-founded this column with Paul Popenoe, a founding practitioner of marriage counseling in the U.S. The two jointly wrote a book of the same title in 1960. Both the book and the column drew their material from the extensive case files of the American Institute of Family Relations in Los Angeles, California. MacKaye died in 1992 at the age of 88. Subsequent writers for the feature have included Lois Duncan and Margery D. Rosen.

The illustrations of William Ladd Taylor were featured between 1895 and 1926; the magazine also sold reproductions of his works in oil and watercolor.

== Editors ==
- Louisa Knapp Curtis (1883–1889)
- Edward William Bok (1890–1919)
- H. O. Davis (1919–1920)
- Barton W. Currie (1920–1928)
- Loring A. Schuler (1928–1935)
- Bruce Gould and Beatrice Gould (1935–1962)
- Curtiss Anderson (1962–1964)
- Davis Thomas (1964–1965)
- John Mack Carter (1965–1973)
- Lenore Hershey (1973–1981)
- Myrna Blyth (1981–2002)
- Diane Salvatore (2002–2008)
- Sally Lee (2008–2014)

== Other notable staff ==
- Cynthia May Alden
- Mary Bass
- Eleanor Hoyt Brainerd
- Kathryn Casey
- Christine Frederick
- Florence Morse Kingsley
- Julia Magruder
- Isabel Mallon
- Helen Reimensnyder Martin
- Jane Nickerson
- Sylvia Porter
- Eben E. Rexford
- Gene Shalit
- Mark Sullivan
- Gladys Taber
- Dorothy Thompson

== Cover gallery ==
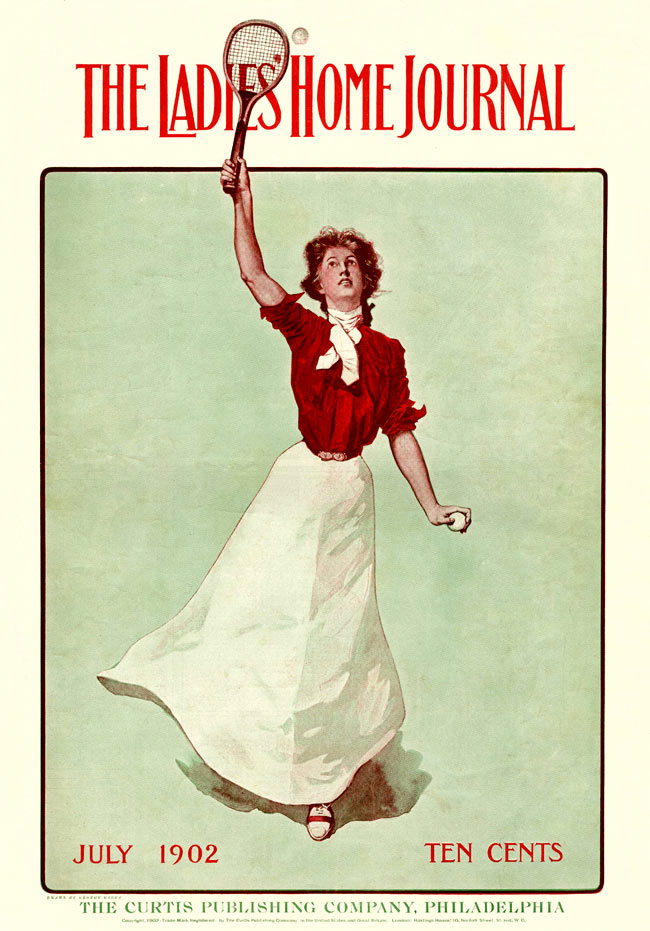
July 1902 cover by George Gibbs

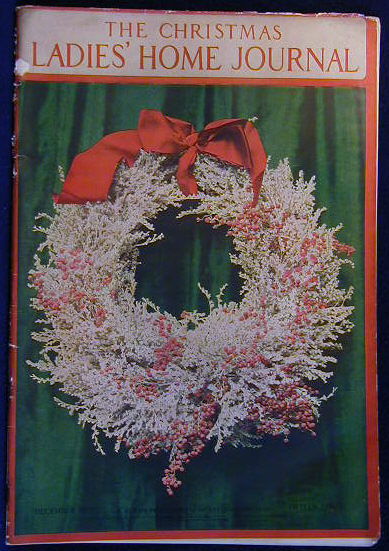
1906 Christmas cover

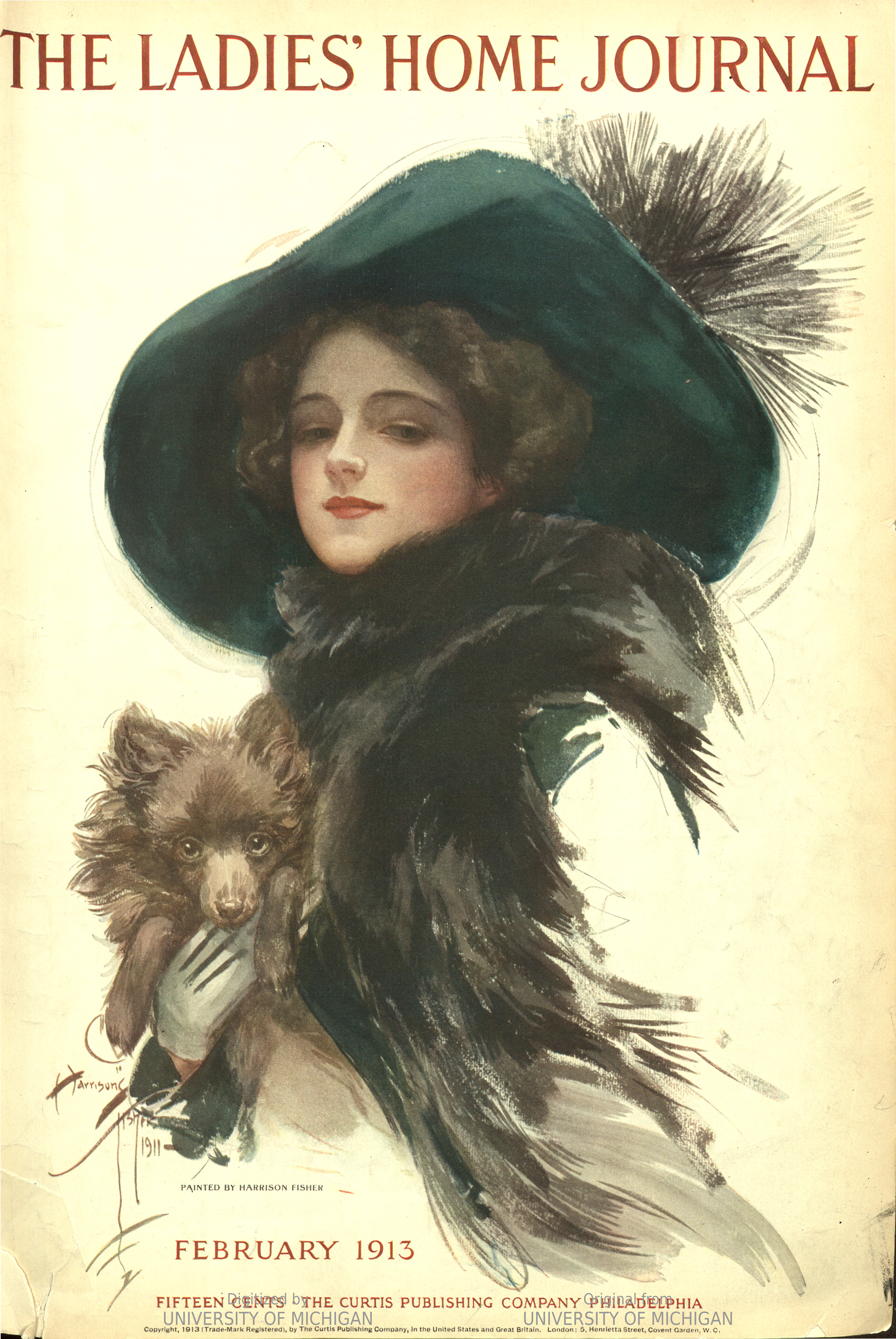
February 1913 cover

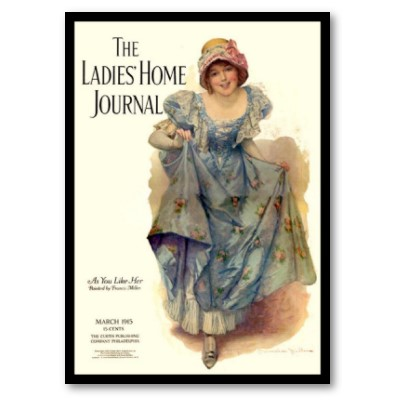
March 1915 cover

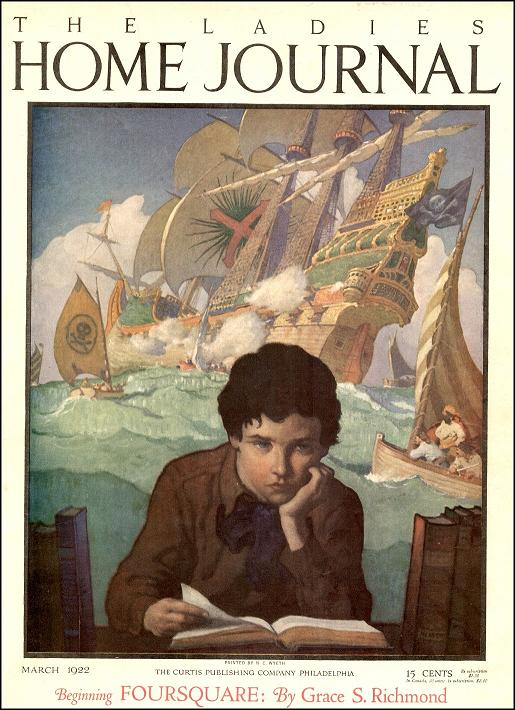
March 1922 issue illustrated by N. C. Wyeth
