= Murder of Nancy Titterton =

1936 murder in New York City

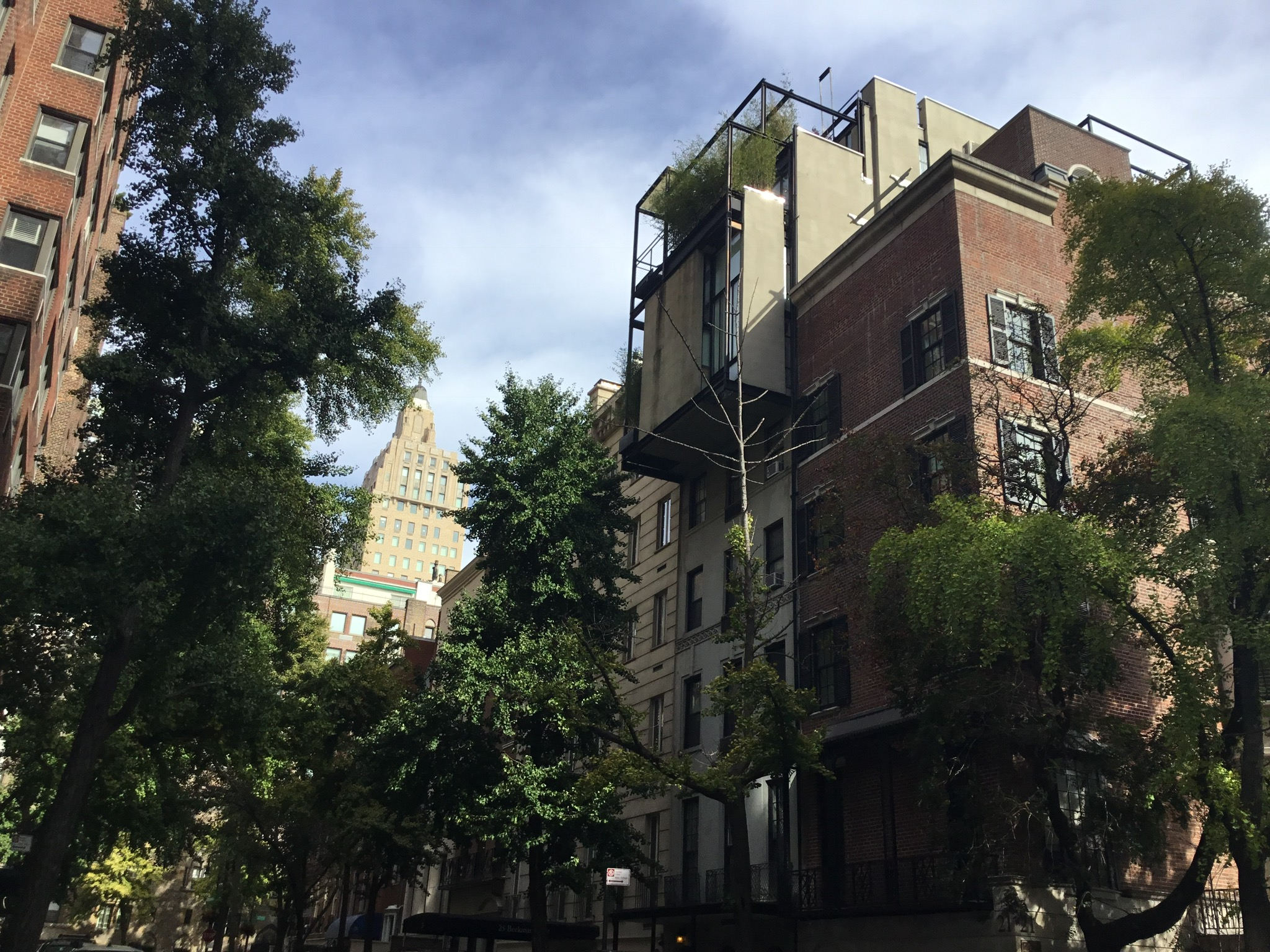
- Beekman Place
- Location: 40.7535°N 73.9649°W; Beekman Place, Midtown Manhattan, New York, US
- Date: April 10, 1936
- Attack type: Murder
- Weapon: Cord
- Deaths: 1
- Victim: Nancy Evans Titterton
- Perpetrator: John Fiorenza

Nancy Violet Evans Titterton (1903 – April 10, 1936) was an American aspiring novelist and a wife of an NBC executive who was murdered in New York City in 1936. She was found strangled in her Manhattan apartment and the only clues were a single horse hair and a piece of cord. It was an early case solved due to forensic science.

== Background ==
In the late 1920s, Ohio-born Nancy Evans worked for the New York Post where she met her husband, Englishman Lewis Henry Titterton. After the couple married in 1929, and her husband was promoted as an executive of the National Broadcasting Company, the couple moved to Manhattan near the East River. Her husband was described as a man who "thought the future of radio depended on the vision of the writer".

One of her works, I Shall Decline My Head, was on the cover of the August 1935 issue of Story Magazine. In 1935, she was offered a book deal following the publication of one of her short stories, and in 1936, she was preparing to write her first novel.

== Crime ==
On the morning of April 10, 1936, 34-year-old Nancy Titterton was killed at her apartment at 22 Beekman Place. Her body was discovered that afternoon by Theodore Kruger and John Fiorenza, two furniture repairmen who were delivering a repaired couch. She was found in a bathtub and had been raped and strangled to death.

There was little evidence at the crime scene apart from a 13-inch (33 cm) piece of cord and a single hair found on the bed. On initial inspection, the hair was dismissed as belonging to the victim. However following further investigation, it was revealed to be a piece of horsehair, which was used as stuffing in the apartment's upholstery.

When news broke of the crime, the Beekman Place "Bathtub Murder" gained notoriety due to extensive media coverage. The case was solved after Alexander Gettler, a scientist at the Office of Chief Medical Examiner of the City of New York, traced the hair to a local upholstery shop recently visited by Titterton. The upholstery shop in question was owned by Kruger, with Fiorenza being an assistant at his shop. The location of the horsehair had already led police to suspect Fiorenza of the crime. Fiorenza, an ex-convict, confessed to the crime.

Fiorenza faced trial for the murder which concluded on May 28, 1936. The jury took 19 hours to reach a guilty verdict. Fiorenza was sentenced to death. Fiorenza was held at Sing Sing prison. He was executed on January 22, 1937, in the electric chair.
