= Bernard Grebanier =

Bernard Grebanier (March 8, 1903 – March 10, 1977) was an American drama historian, critic, writer, theater director and poet, most notable for his studies of the works of William Shakespeare. He wrote music and 28 books.

== Career ==
Grebanier was a professor of English at Brooklyn College from 1926 until 1964. He was a prolific critic during and after his academic career.

Grebanier was friendly with other drama critics in the greater New York City but perhaps none was a better friend than New York Evening Post editor and chief drama critic Joseph Cookman. When Cookman died in 1944, the Post selected Grebanier's tribute to run in the paper among the dozens of tributes sent in.

Grebanier's classes "were the most popular at Brooklyn" between the end of World War II and his retirement in 1965. His Shakespeare classes enrolled hundreds of students every semester. His method of teaching involved a line-by-line reading of Shakespeare's plays, interspersed with commentary on art, politics, and human psychology.

The most influential of his books are The Heart of Hamlet, The Truth About Shylock, and Playwriting: How to Write for the Theatre. In these books he respectively 1) characterizes Hamlet as misunderstood by critics, as the hero is neither passive, delaying, crazy, nor acting crazy, but rather a Renaissance man who tackles the difficult task of proving Claudius guilty and then proceeds to exact revenge; 2) maintains that Shakespeare does not pursue the question of anti-Semitism in The Merchant of Venice but rather uses the stereotype of the Jewish moneylender to ask critical questions about cold-hearted bankers and human compassion; and 3) in a comprehensive textbook, discovers principles regarding the structure of drama that are still taught in creative writing courses across the country.

Grebanier was briefly a member of the Communist Party but soon became embittered and disillusioned about it. In 1941 he was quoted in evidence presented to the Supreme Court of the United States denouncing a former associate professor as a Communist during the professor's appeal against dismissal from his position.

== Selected works ==
- The Uninhibited Byron (1970)
- Barron's Simplified Approach to Chaucer
- "An Introduction to Imaginative Literature" (with Seynour Reiter) (1960)
- The Heart of Hamlet (1960)
- Playwriting: How to Write for the Theatre (1961)
- The Truth About Shylock (1962)
- "The Great Shakespeare Forgery" (1965)
- Then Came Each Actor (1975)
- Last Harvest: Poems of Bernard Grebanier (1980)

== Sources ==
- Author and Bookinfo.com
