= William F. Ladd =

United States Army general

General William F. Ladd
- Born: William Ferson Ladd; February 14, 1896; Spencer, Massachusetts
- Died: February 26, 1980 (aged 84); Sacramento, California
- Spouse: Jane H. Wilson
- Military career
- Allegiance: United States
- Branch: United States Army
- Rank: Major General
- Commands: Connecticut State Militia
- Website: www.ct.gov/mil

William Ferson Ladd (February 14, 1896 – February 26, 1980), born in Spencer, Massachusetts on 14, February 1896, was the thirty-third Adjutant General of the State of Connecticut. During World War I, Ladd was an Army pilot.

== Military career ==
William Ladd attempted to join the aviation service, but was unable to strike a recruiting office when enlistments for aviation were open. Ladd enlisted in the Headquarters Troop, 76th Division. After six months of service, Ladd transferred to Cornell University of military aeronautics. He graduated in 1918 from Cornell and then transferred to Camp Dick, Dallas, Texas. Then he went to Fort Worth, Texas for more training. In November 1918 he graduated and became an expert pilot. Ladd was discharged from the service in December 1918 as a second lieutenant.

In 1925 Ladd was appointed major and commander of the 118th Observation Squadron 43rd Division Aviation. Ladd for several years occupied a position as deputy tax commissioner. William Ladd was Connecticut Adjutant General from 1930 to 1939. Ladd was first air officer in the country to be adjutant general. Ladd memberships were National Aeronautic Association, Hartford Lodge No. 88 A.F. & A.M., National Guard Association, American Legion and Reserve Officers Association, Washington Commandery, No. 1 K.T., A.A.S.R., No.19, B.P.O.E., and Adjutant General Association.

== Personal life ==
William F. Ladd was born in Spencer, Massachusetts in 1896. He married Jane Wilson, who was the niece of Mrs. E. L. Cushman. William Ladd and Mary Wilson had two daughters.

He died in Sacramento, California on February 26, 1980.

Military offices
Preceded by George M. Cole	Connecticut Adjutant General; 1930–1939	Succeeded by Reginald B. DeLacour
