= Merrimack Warriors =

- University: Merrimack College
- Nickname: Warriors
- NCAA: NCAA Division I
- Conference: MAAC; Independent (football); Hockey East (men's and women's ice hockey); Northeast Conference (field hockey)
- Athletic director: Joe Foley
- Location: North Andover, Massachusetts
- Varsity teams: 22
- Football stadium: Duane Stadium
- Basketball arena: Hammel Court/Lawler Arena
- Ice hockey arena: Lawler Arena
- Baseball stadium: Warrior Baseball Diamond
- Softball stadium: Martone-Mejail Field
- Soccer stadium: Martone-Mejail Field
- Lacrosse stadium: Duane Stadium
- Colors: Blue and gold
- Fight song: Down in the Valley of Victory
- Website: merrimackathletics.com
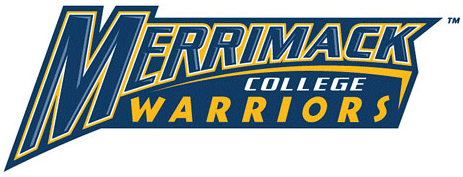

Team NCAA championships
- 4

The Merrimack Warriors are the intercollegiate athletic teams that represent Merrimack College, located in North Andover, Massachusetts, United States, in National Collegiate Athletic Association (NCAA) sporting competitions. All of the Warrior athletic teams compete at the Division I level. Men's and women's ice hockey compete in the Hockey East conference, and football competes as an FCS Independent, while the remaining teams are members of the Metro Atlantic Athletic Conference.

The college's combination of academic and athletic success has garnered Merrimack the #4 ranking in the country among NCAA Division II schools in the Top 100 Collegiate Power Rankings that are published by the National College Scouting Association. Merrimack finished 96th in the overall NCSA Power Rankings across all three NCAA divisions.

During the 2019–20 season Merrimack began their four-year transition from Division II to Division I and became a full Division I member in the 2023–24 season, making Merrimack eligible for all NCAA tournaments.

In 2024, the school announced it would join the MAAC, and the football team would become an FCS independent.

== History ==
Highlights of Merrimack athletic history include four national championships: the 1978 men's hockey team won the Division II men's ice hockey championship; the 1994 women's softball team won the Division II Women's College World Series; and men's lacrosse won the 2018 and 2019 National Title. In 2006, Merrimack football became Northeast-10 co-champions and received their first NCAA Division II playoff bid to go on to win their first NCAA playoff game. In 2012, Merrimack men's tennis became Northeast-10 champions, led by senior captains Max Eppley and Sean Pahler, and first-year head coach Sean Tully. This was Merrimack's first-ever men's tennis championship. In 2019 the college announced they would move up to Division I and join the NEC. The men's basketball team won the NEC regular season in just their first year along with the Men’s soccer team. Many of the other programs also had success in their first couple of seasons, showing the school could compete at the DI level. In 2024, the women's bowling team became the first non-hockey team to make the Division I tournament. Later that year it was announced the school would leave the NEC to join the MAAC.

== Varsity teams ==
Men's sports	Women's sports
Baseball	Basketball
Basketball	Bowling
Cross country	Cross country
Football	Dance
Golf	Field hockey
Ice hockey	Golf
Lacrosse	Ice hockey
Soccer	Lacrosse
Tennis	Rowing
Track & field^{1}	Soccer
Volleyball	Softball
	Swimming & diving
	Tennis
	Track & field^{1}
	Volleyball
^{1} – includes both indoor and outdoor

Merrimack College participates in 25 varsity sports at the Division I level. The men's hockey team had been competing at the DI level since the mid-80s. In 2019, it was announced that the school would move all their programs to the Division I level and join the Northeast Conference. In 2023, the school added two new programs: men's volleyball and women's bowling. In 2024, the school announced they would join the MAAC. However, the field hockey program would stay in the NEC and the football team would become independent, due to the MAAC not sponsoring football.

=== Football ===
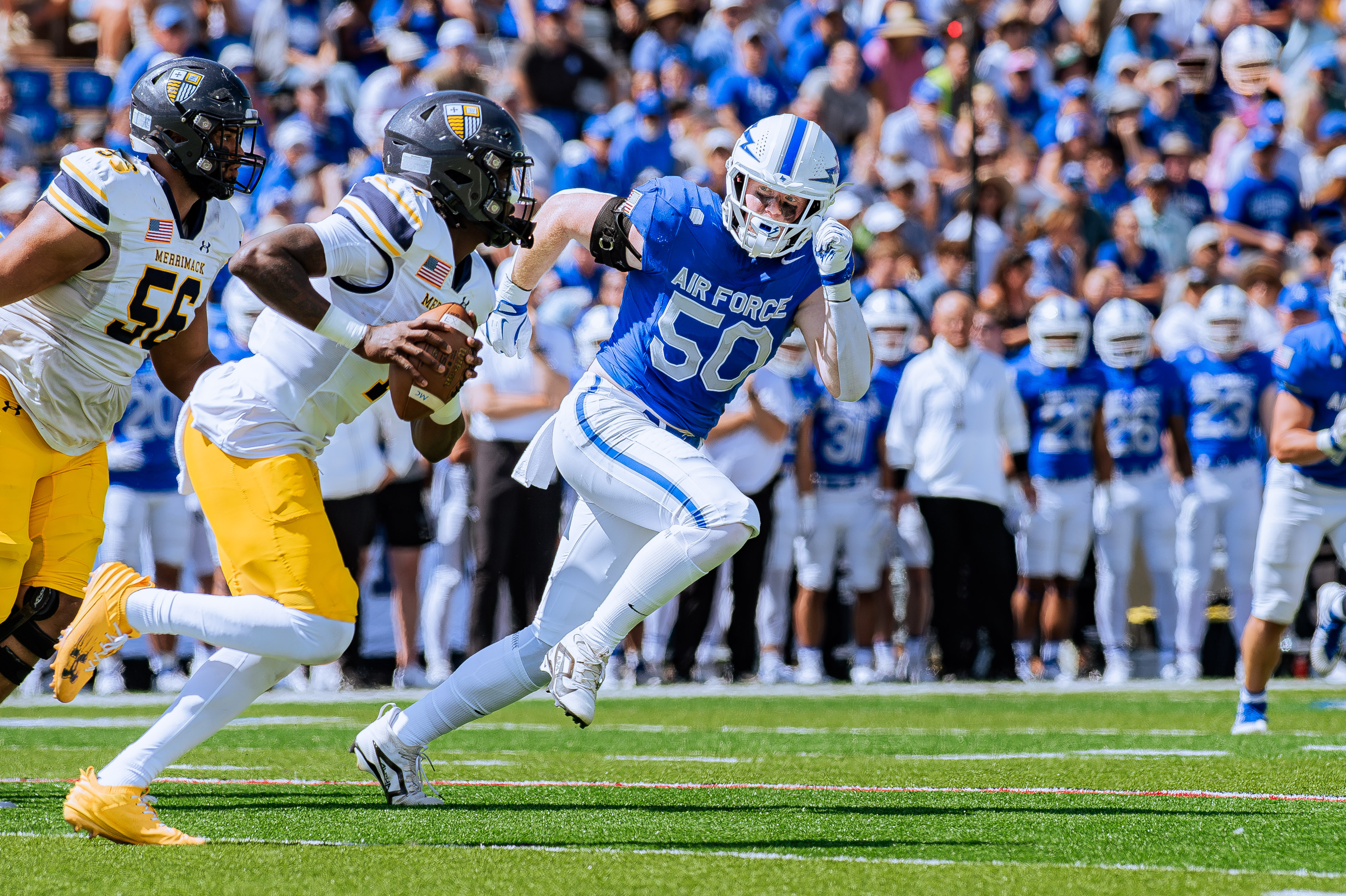
Merrimack (in white) v Air Force in 2024

Merrimack has made one appearance in the NCAA Division II football playoffs; their record is 1–1.

Year	Round	Opponent	Result
2006	First round Second round	Southern Connecticut; Shepherd	W, 28–26; L, 7–31
Playoff record			1–1

==== Conferences ====
- 1985–1995: Independent
- 1996: Eastern Collegiate Football Conference
- 1997–2000: Eastern Football Conference
- 2001–2018: Northeast-10 Conference
- 2019-2023: Northeast Conference
- 2024-present: FCS Independent

=== Men’s Basketball ===
The Merrimack college men’s basketball team has had a fair amount of success at the Division II level, making the NCAA tournament 11 times. They made an even bigger splash in 2019-2020, in their first Division I season. They went 14-4 in conference and 20-11 overall, to win the NEC regular season. This was the first time that a transitioning team had won a regular season title in their first year. The Warriors also won the NEC tournament in 2023, but could not go to the NCAA tournament because of the NCAA transition period.

=== Women’s Basketball ===
The Merrimack Warriors women’s basketball team had its inaugural season in 1972. They made the DII NCAA final four back to back seasons in 2004 and 2005 where they had a program best 31-4 record. In 2026 they made their first appearance in the WNIT.

=== Men’s Ice Hockey ===
The Merrimack college men's ice hockey program was one of the first sports to be recognized as a varsity program, in 1954. They were very successful at the D2 level, winning numerous ECAC 2 championships in the 1960s and 1970s. In 1978, they became the first team in school history to win a national championship, beating Lake Forest 12-2. In 1985, they became the first Merrimack program to move to DI. From 1987 to 1989, they won three straight ECAC East titles. They got an at-large bid to the NCAA tournament in 1988 after a 32-win campaign. They were the first team in school history to make a D1 NCAA tournament. During the 1989-90 season, they officially joined Hockey East, where they remain. In 2026 the team won their first Hockey East tournament championship, becoming the first #8 seed to accomplish the milestone.

=== Women’s Ice Hockey ===
The Merrimack women’s ice hockey team played its inaugural season in 2015–16, like the men’s program they compete in Hockey East.

=== Soccer ===
Merrimack College men's soccer team made school history in 2012, with the program's first-ever NCAA Division II national tournament berth. After finishing in first place in the Northeast-10 regular season, the team won the first round of the tournament against rivals Franklin Pierce University, but were knocked out the following round by Northeast-10 rivals Southern New Hampshire University. The 2012 men's soccer team was led by head coach Anthony Martone and assistant coaches Derek Valego, Michael Allen, Eric Ernst and Sam Nunes. The team was led on the field by captains Alejandro Fuchs of Caracas, Venezuela and Nelson da Graca of Gothenburg, Sweden. In their first year at the DI level, the team went 11-3-2 overall, and had a perfect 9-0 in NEC play.

=== Lacrosse ===
The Merrimack men's lacrosse team saw much success in the late 2010s, making five straight D2 tournament appearances from 2015 to 2019. They made the final four in 2015 and 2016, and were national runners up in 2017. In 2018, they beat Saint Leo 23-6 to win their first national championship. They then went back-to-back, beating Limestone 16-8 in 2019, closing out their time at the D2 level on top.

=== Softball ===
Merrimack college softball has had incredible success at the Division II level, especially in the 1990s, when they won six conference tournament titles and seven regular season titles. They went 45-4 and won the national championship. They had 15 total appearances in the NCAA tournament at the D2 level, including five regional championships.

== NCAA championships ==
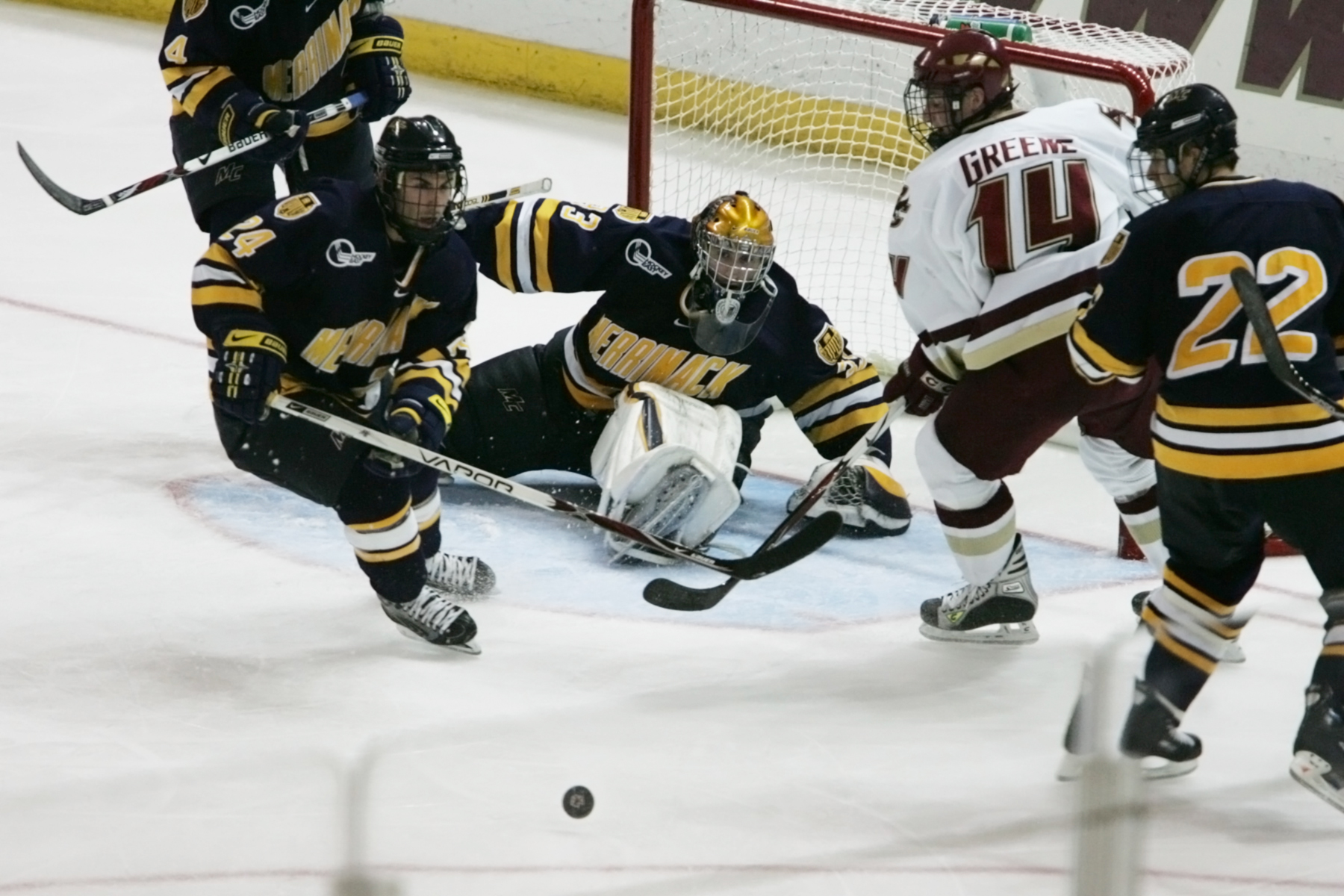
Merrimack versus Boston College (Andrew Braithwaite pictured)

=== National championships ===
- Men's ice hockey: 1978
- Softball: 1994
- Men's lacrosse: 2018, 2019

=== Individual national championships ===
Carly Muscaro (women's track & field)

- 2015-16 (400m indoors)
- 2016 (400m outdoors)
- 2016-17 (200m, 400m indoors)
- 2017 (200m, 400m outdoors)

=== National championship runner up ===
- Men's ice hockey: 1984
- Men's lacrosse: 2017

=== Regional championships ===
- Women's basketball: 2004, 2005
- Softball: 1994, 1995, 1998, 1999, 2000
- Women's soccer: 1996

=== Appearances ===
- Baseball (4): 1990, 1995, 1996, 2018
- Men's basketball (11): 1977, 1978, 1991, 1992, 2000, 2008, 2009, 2010, 2017, 2018, 2019
- Sweet 16 appearances (2): 1976, 1977
- Women's basketball (3): 2003, 2004, 2005
- Sweet 16 appearances (2): 2004, 2005
- Elite 8 appearances (2): 2004, 2005
- Final four appearances (2): 2004, 2005
- Football (1): 2006
- Men's ice hockey (7):
  - Division II: 1978, 1980, 1982, 1984
  - Division II runner up: 1984
  - Division II frozen four: 1978, 1980, 1982, 1984
  - Division I: 1988, 2011, 2023
- Men's lacrosse (7): 2009, 2015, 2016, 2017, 2018, 2019
- Runner up: 2017
- Final four 2009, 2015, 2016, 2017, 2018, 2019
- Women's soccer (11): 1996, 1999, 2001, 2002, 2003, 2004, 2005, 2007, 2008, 2009, 2011
- Softball (15): 1991, 1992, 1993, 1994, 1995, 1996, 1997, 1998, 1999, 2000, 2001, 2002, 2004, 2011, 2017, 2018
- World Series appearances: 1994, 1995, 1998, 1999, 2000
- Men's tennis (9): 2008, 2009, 2010, 2011, 2012, 2013, 2014, 2015, 2016
- Women's tennis (2): 2009, 2014
- Field hockey (5): 2011, 2012, 2013, 2015, 2018
- Women's volleyball (2): 2007, 2008
- Men's soccer (5): 2012, 2014, 2015, 2016, 2017
- Women's cross country (1): 2018
- Women's bowling (1): 2024

== Conference championships ==
=== MAAC ===
- Men’s basketball regular season (1): 2026

=== Northeast ===
- Men's basketball regular season (3): 2020,2023,2024
- Men's basketball tournament champions (1): 2023
- Men's soccer regular season (1): 2019
- Women's soccer regular season (1): 2023
- Women's bowling tournament (1): 2024

Other

- NEC Men's Commissioners Cup: 2023, 2024

=== Hockey East ===
- Men’s tournament champions (1): 2026

=== Northeast-10 ===
- Baseball tournament (4): 1990, 1995, 1996, 2018
- Baseball regular season (5): 1994, 1995, 1996, 1997, 1999
- Football (2): 2006, 2009
- Men's basketball tournament (3): 1992, 2000, 2019
- Men's basketball regular season (1): 2000
- Women's basketball tournament (1): 2004
- Women's basketball regular season (2): 2004, 2005
- Women's cross country (3): 1997, 1998, 1999
- Men's lacrosse tournament (3): 2000, 2010, 2018
- Men's lacrosse regular season (2): 2013, 2019
- Men's soccer tournament (4): 1995, 1996, 1997, 2017
- Men's soccer regular season (4): 1994, 1996, 1997, 2012
- Women's soccer tournament (9): 1986, 1987, 1988, 1989, 1990, 1993, 1995, 1996, 1999
- Women's soccer regular season (8): 1986, 1987, 1989, 1990, 1993, 1995, 1996, 1999
- Softball tournament (8): 1991, 1992, 1993, 1994, 1995, 1999, 2001, 2002
- Softball regular season (12): 1988, 1991, 1992, 1993, 1994, 1995, 1998, 1999, 2000, 2001, 2002, 2017
- Men's tennis tournament (3): 2012, 2013, 2015
- Men's tennis regular season (5): 2011, 2012, 2013, 2014, 2015
- Women's tennis regular season (1): 2014
- Field hockey regular season (2): 2011, 2012
- Women's volleyball regular season (1): 1999
- Women's golf (4): 2015, 2016, 2017, 2019

Other

- NE10 Presidents Cup: 2000, 2018

=== ECAC ===
- Mens ice hockey tournament: ECAC 2 (4): 1967, 1968, 1977, 1980, ECAC east (3): 1987, 1988, 1989
- Mens ice hockey regular season: ECAC 2 (5): 1968, 1969, 1975, 1976, 1977, ECAC east (3): 1987, 1988, 1989
- Men's soccer (1): 1997
- Women's soccer (2): 1988, 2000
- Men's lacrosse (2): 1999, 2000
- Men's basketball (3): 1989, 1998, 1999
- Baseball (3): 1988, 1989, 1995

== Spirit squads ==
Merrimack spirit squads

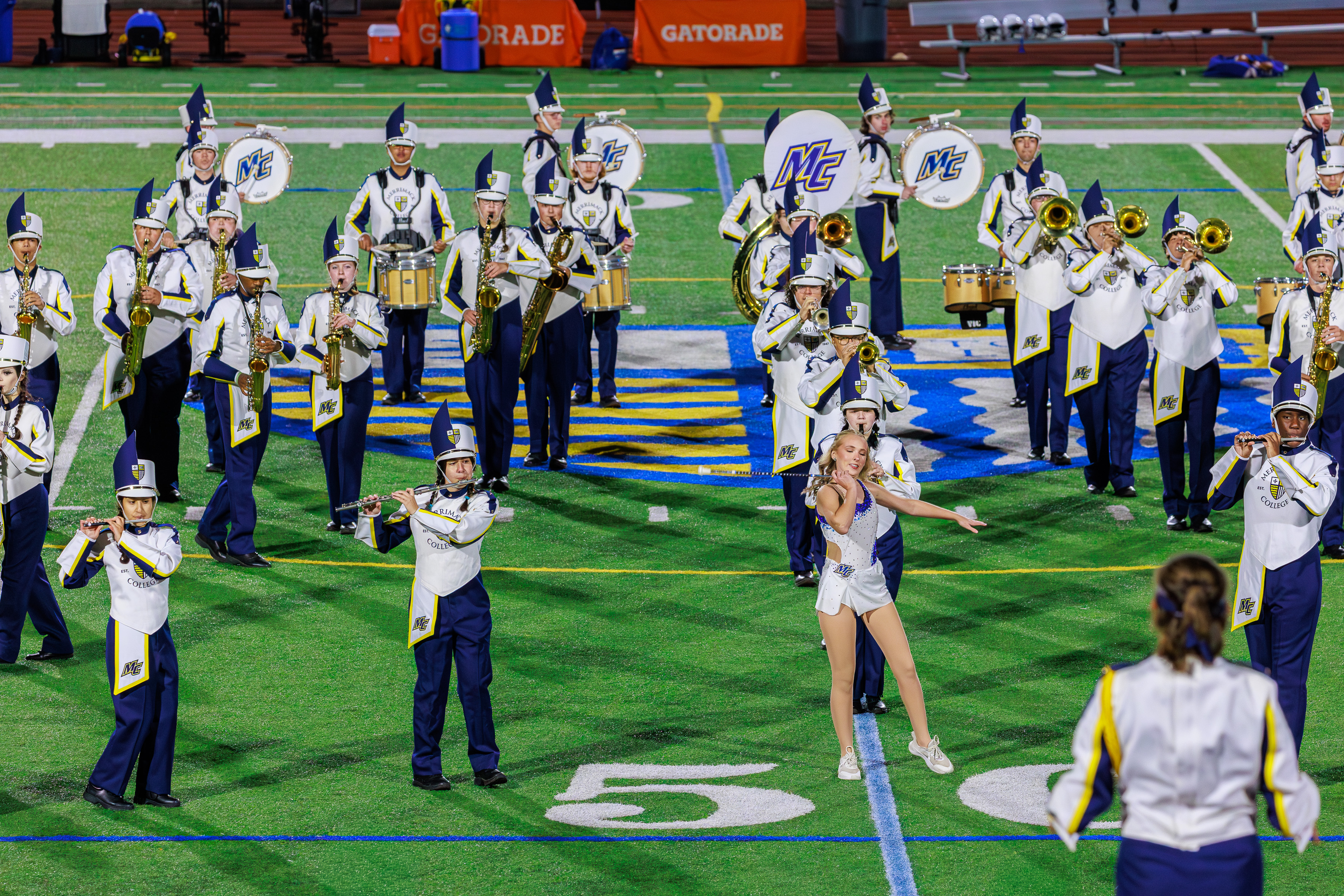
Marching Band

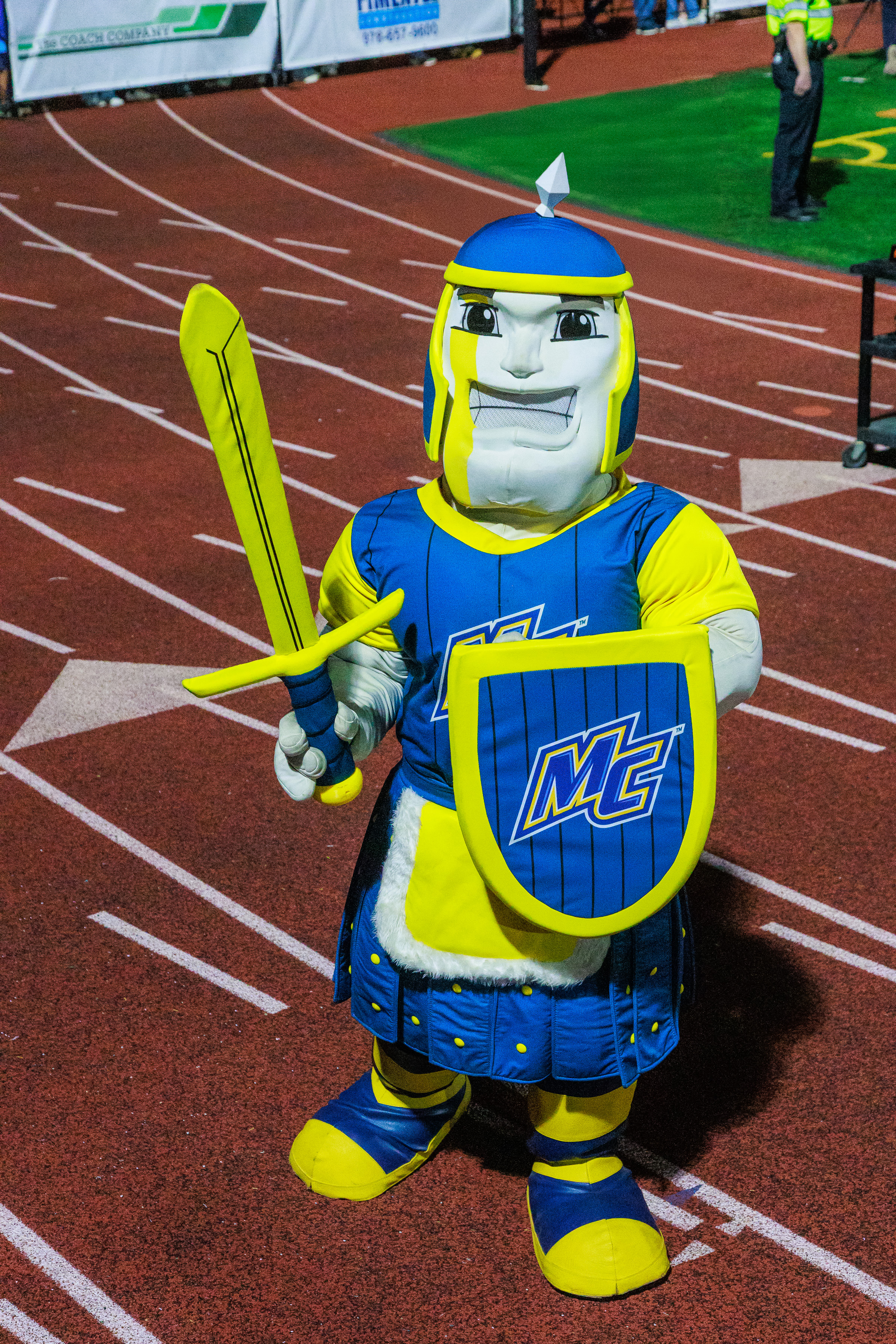
Mack the Warrior

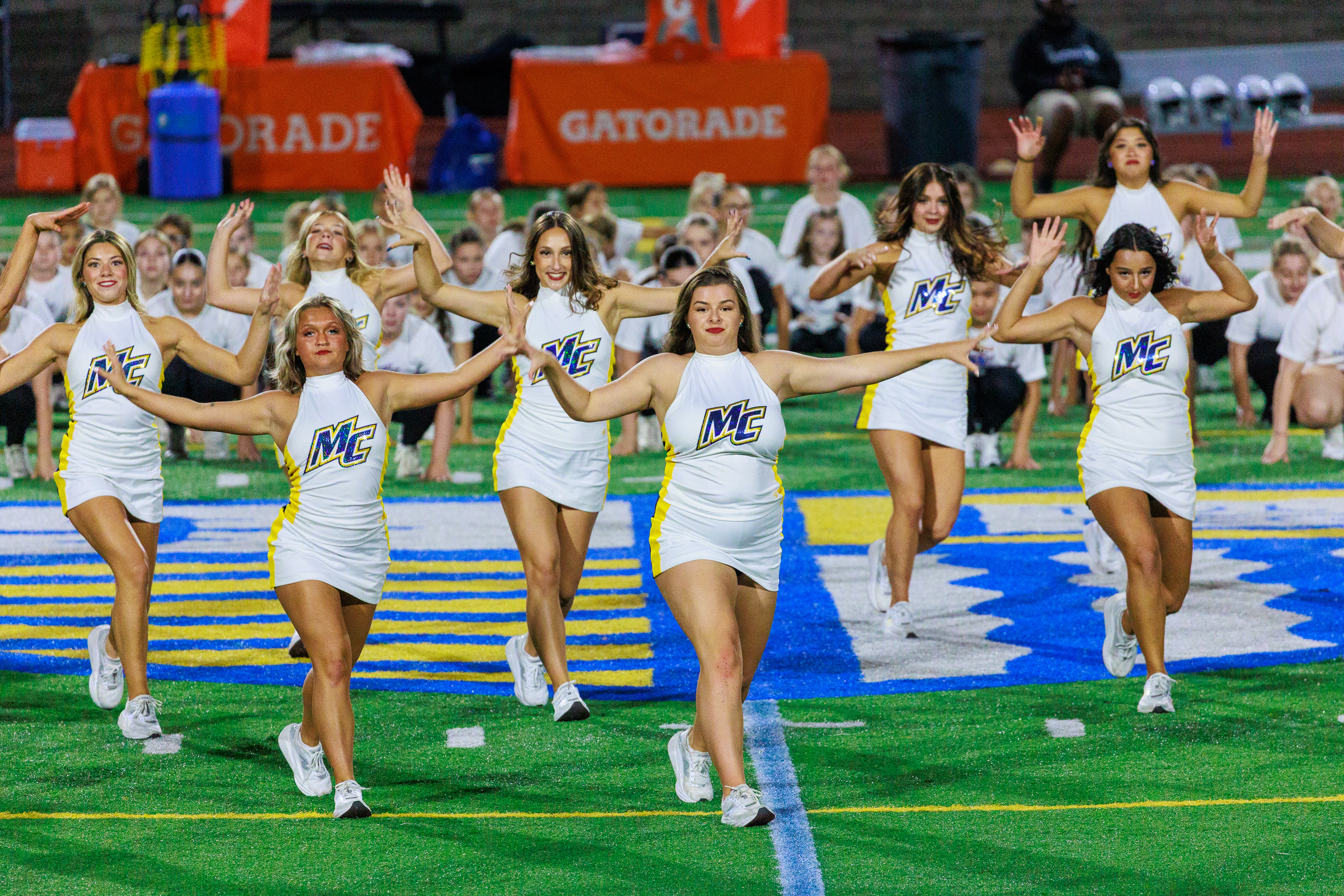
Dance Team

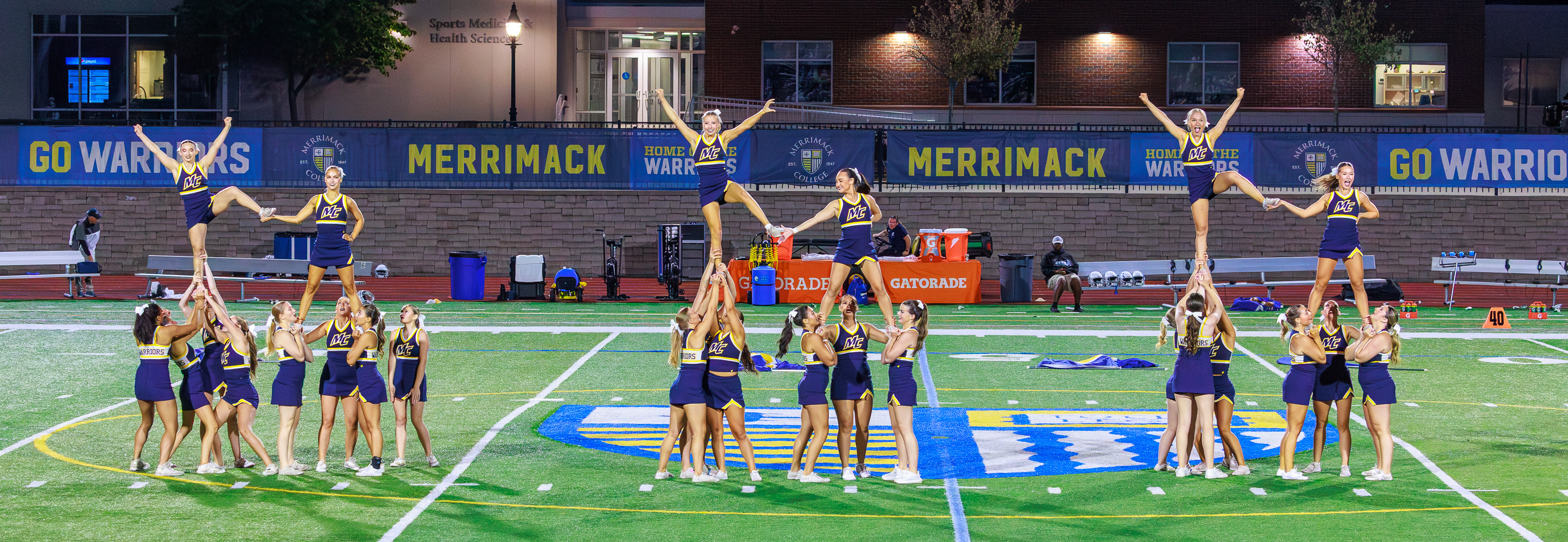
Cheer Team

The switch from Division II to Division I (starting in the 2019-2020 season) meant a corresponding expansion and support of Merrimack's spirit squads.

=== Dance Team ===
Merrimack's dance team placed third at the NDA College Nationals in 2022, and came in second in 2023. The team was elevated to varsity level status in spring 2023.

=== Mack the Warrior mascot ===
The warrior mascot first appeared as a Native American chief on the jerseys of the basketball team. In 1972, the warrior mascot became official.

In 2003, "Mack (short for Merrimack) the Warrior" was introduced as a new mascot for the school. Mack's look was redesigned in October 2023. He is depicted as a costumed knight figure in the school's yellow and blue colors, with sword, shield, cape, and helmet.

=== Marching band ===
Although Merrimack had a pep band, the school's first full marching band wasn't formed until 2021, as a result of the school's move to Division I athletics. In November 2021, shortly after forming, the band appeared in a cameo in a scene in the Whitney Houston biopic "I Wanna Dance with Somebody," which was filmed at Gillette Stadium in nearby Foxborough.

In 2024 the band traveled to Ireland to support the men’s hockey team at the Friendship Four tournament in Belfast.

== Facilities ==
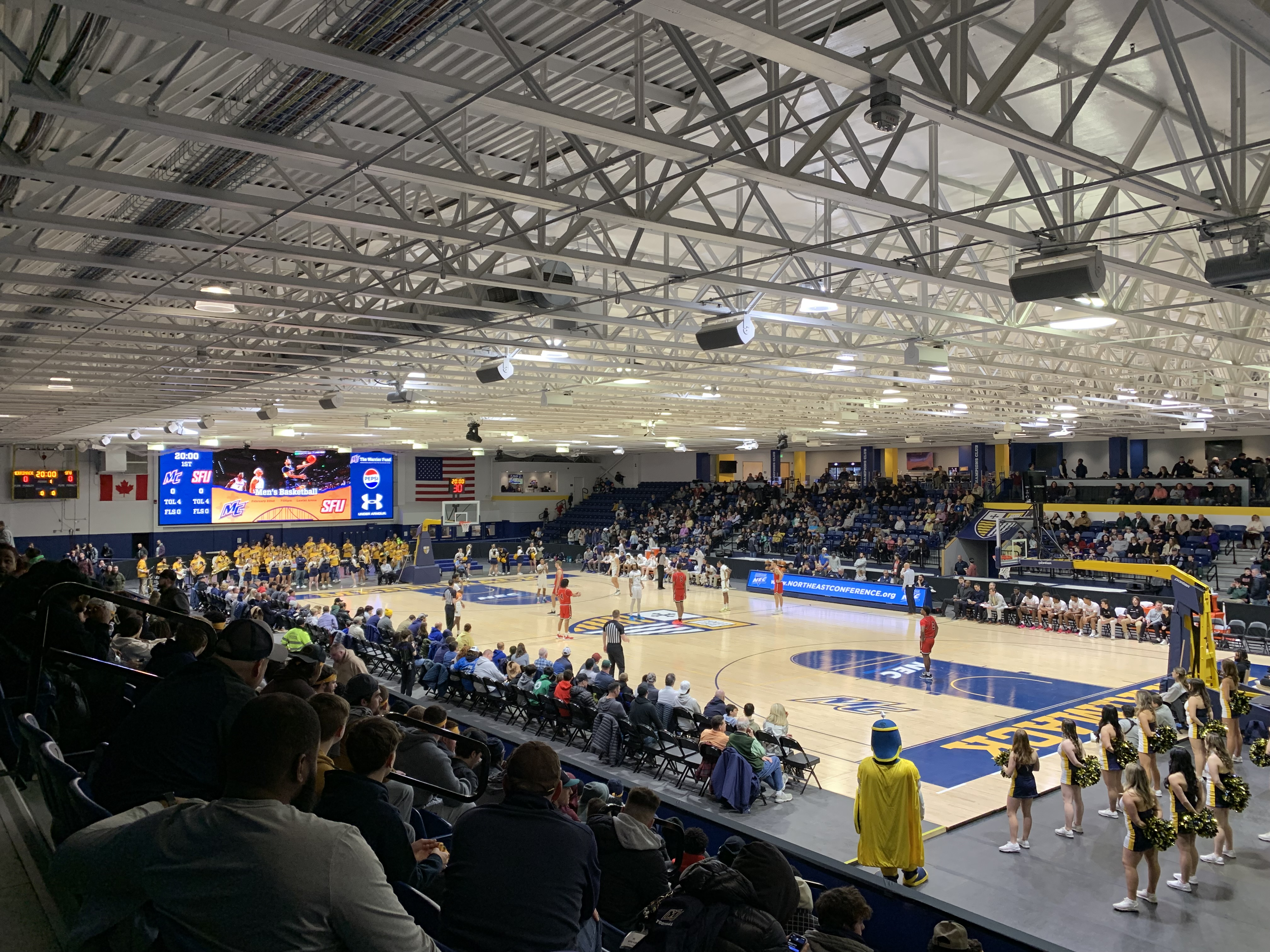
A basketball game at Lawler Arena in 2024

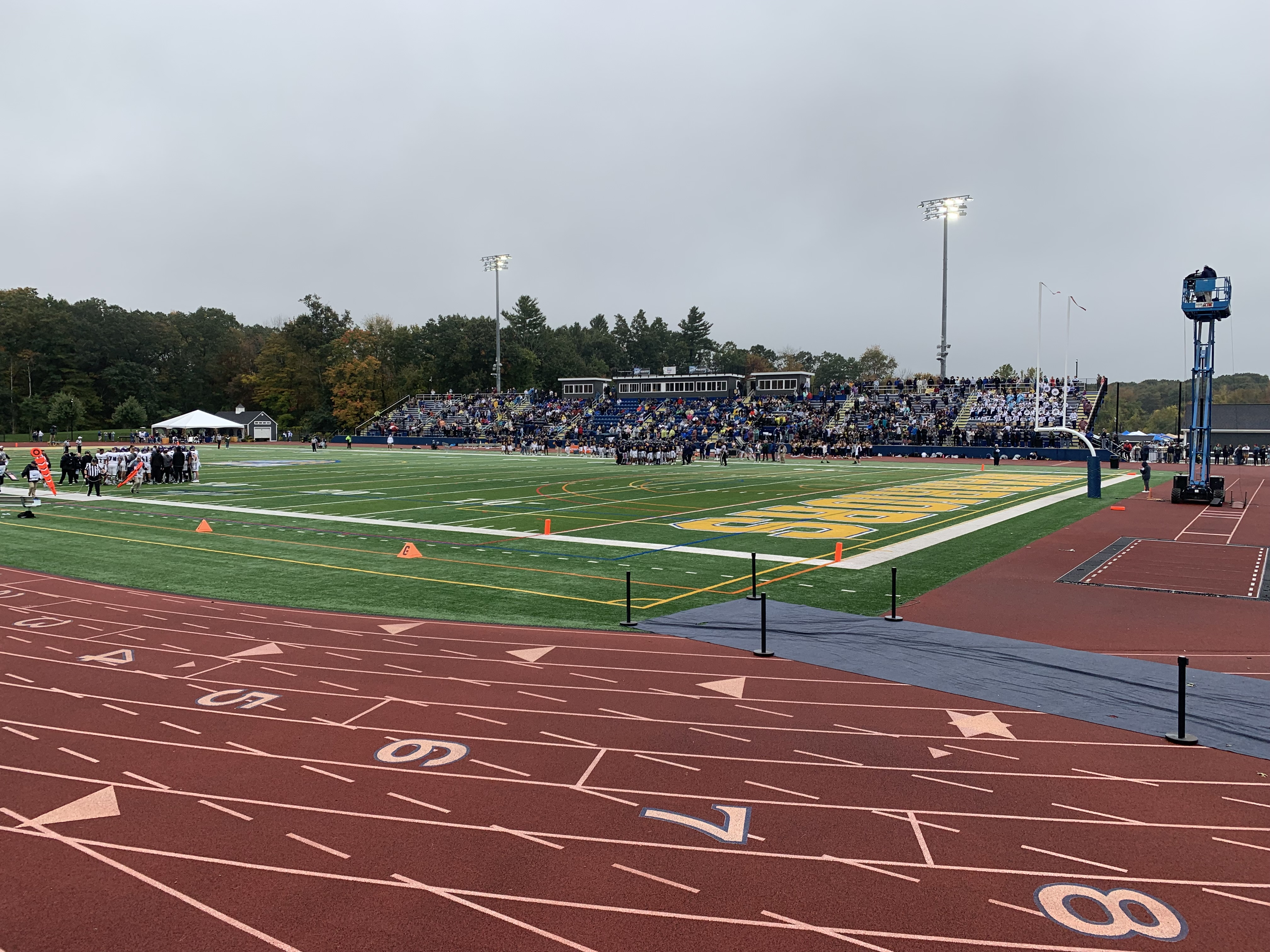
Duane Stadium in 2023

Venue	Sport	Capacity
Lawler Arena/Rink	Hockey/basketball	2,549/3,000
Martone Mejail Field	Soccer/softball	N/A
Hammel Court	Basketball/volleyball	1,200
Duane Stadium	Football	4,000
Duane Stadium	Lacrosse	4,000
Duane Stadium	Field hockey	4,000
Duane Stadium	Track & field	4,000
Greater Lawrence Tech	Baseball	N/A
