= NCAA Division II softball tournament =

Annual college softball tournament

- Association: NCAA
- Sport: College softball
- Founded: 1982; 44 years ago
- Division: Division II
- Country: United States; Canada
- Most recent champion: Saint Leo (1st)
- Most titles: Cal State Northridge (4)
- Broadcaster: ESPNU
- Tournament format: Double elimination
- Website: NCAA.com

The NCAA Division II softball tournament is the annual tournament hosted by the NCAA to determine the national champion of women's college softball among Division II members in the United States and Canada. The final rounds of the tournament are also referred to as the NCAA Division II Women's College World Series. The tournament has been held annually since 1982.

Cal State Northridge have been the most successful team in the history of the tournament, with four national titles. Of the active Division II members, there are six teams with two titles each.

Saint Leo are the reigning national champions, winning their first national title in 2026.

== History ==
Softball was one of twelve women's sports added to the National Collegiate Athletic Association (NCAA) championship program for the 1981-82 school year, as the NCAA engaged in battle with the Association for Intercollegiate Athletics for Women (AIAW) for sole governance of women's collegiate sports. The AIAW continued to conduct its established championship program in the same twelve (and other) sports; however, after a year of dual women's championships, the NCAA conquered the AIAW and usurped its authority and membership.

See Association for Intercollegiate Athletics for Women Champions for the AIAW Division II and III softball champions from 1980 to 1982 (in 1982, in all three divisions, there were both NCAA and AIAW champions).

== Results ==
NCAA Division II Softball Championship
Single Game Championship Format
Year	Host city	Stadium	Championship Results		
Year	Host city	Stadium	Champion	Score	Runner-up
1982	Stratford, Connecticut		Sam Houston State ^{(1)}	3–2	Cal State Northridge
1983	Orange, California		Cal State Northridge ^{(1)}	1–0	Sam Houston State
1984	Sioux Falls, South Dakota		Cal State Northridge ^{(2)}	1–0	Akron
1985	Northridge, California		Cal State Northridge ^{(3)}	2–1	Akron
1986	Akron, Ohio		Stephen F. Austin ^{(1)}	1–0	Cal State Northridge
1987	Quincy, Illinois		Cal State Northridge ^{(4)}	4–0	Florida Southern
1988	Sacramento, California		Cal State Bakersfield ^{(1)}	4–3	Lock Haven
1989	Sacramento, California		Cal State Bakersfield ^{(2)}	8–5	Sacramento State
1990	Midland, Michigan		Cal State Bakersfield ^{(3)}	6–2	Cal State Northridge
1991	Midland, Michigan		Augustana (SD) ^{(1)}	3–2 ^{(10 inn.)}	Bloomsburg
1992	Shawnee, Kansas		Missouri Southern State ^{(1)}	1–0	Cal State East Bay
1993	Shawnee, Kansas		Florida Southern ^{(1)}	11–5	Augustana (SD)
1994	Shawnee, Kansas		Merrimack ^{(1)}	6–2	Humboldt State
1995	Salem, Virginia	James I. Moyer Sports Complex	Kennesaw State ^{(1)}	3–2 ^{(5 inn.)}	Bloomsburg
1996	Emporia, Kansas	Trusler Sports Complex	Kennesaw State ^{(2)}	6–4	Nebraska–Omaha
1997	Salem, Virginia	James I. Moyer Sports Complex	California (PA) ^{(1)}	2–1	Wisconsin–Parkside
1998	Pensacola, Florida		California (PA) ^{(2)}	2–1	Barry
1999	Salem, Virginia	James I. Moyer Sports Complex	Humboldt State ^{(1)}	7–2	Nebraska–Kearney
2000	Columbus, Georgia	South Commons Softball Complex	North Dakota State ^{(1)}	3–1	Kennesaw State
2001	Salem, Virginia	James I. Moyer Sports Complex	Nebraska–Omaha ^{(1)}	4–0	Lewis
2002	Salem, Virginia	James I. Moyer Sports Complex	St. Mary's (TX) ^{(1)}	4–0	Grand Valley State
2003	Salem, Oregon		UC Davis ^{(1)}	7–0	Georgia College
2004	Altamonte Springs, Florida		Angelo State ^{(1)}	7–3	Florida Southern
2005	Salem, Virginia	James I. Moyer Sports Complex	Lynn*	5–3	Kennesaw State
2006	Salem, Virginia	James I. Moyer Sports Complex	Lock Haven ^{(1)}	3–0	Emporia State
2007	Akron, Ohio		SIU Edwardsville ^{(1)}	3–2 ^{(12 inn.)}	Lock Haven
2008	Houston, Texas		Humboldt State ^{(2)}	1–0	Emporia State
2009	Salem, Virginia	James I. Moyer Sports Complex	Lock Haven ^{(2)}	8–0	Alabama–Huntsville
2010	St. Joseph, Missouri		Hawaii Pacific ^{(1)}	4–3 ^{(5 inn.)}	Valdosta State
2011	Salem, Virginia	James I. Moyer Sports Complex	UC San Diego ^{(1)}	4–0	Alabama–Huntsville
2012	Louisville, Kentucky		Valdosta State ^{(1)}	4–1	UC San Diego
2013	Salem, Virginia	James I. Moyer Sports Complex	Central Oklahoma ^{(1)}	5–2	Kutztown
2014	Salem, Virginia	James I. Moyer Sports Complex	West Texas A&M ^{(1)}	3–2	Valdosta State
2015	Oklahoma City, Oklahoma	ASA Hall of Fame Stadium	North Georgia ^{(1)}	4–0	Dixie State
Championship Series Format
Year	Host city	Stadium	Champion	Series	Runner-up
2016	Denver, Colorado		North Alabama ^{(1)}	2–1	Humboldt State
2017	Salem, Virginia	James I. Moyer Sports Complex	Minnesota State ^{(1)}	2–0	Angelo State
2018	Salem, Virginia	James I. Moyer Sports Complex	Southern Indiana ^{(1)}	2–0	Saint Anselm
2019	Denver, Colorado		Augustana (SD) ^{(2)}	2–1	Texas A&M–Kingsville
2020	Chattanooga, Tennessee	Canceled due to COVID-19			
2021	Denver, Colorado		West Texas A&M ^{(2)}	2–1	Biola
2022	Denver, Colorado		Rogers State ^{(1)}	2–0	Cal State Dominguez Hills
2023	Chattanooga, Tennessee	Frost Stadium at Warner Park	North Georgia ^{(2)}	2–0	Grand Valley State
2024	Longwood, Florida	Boombah-Soldiers Creek Park	UT Tyler ^{(1)}	2–0	Western Washington
2025	Chattanooga, Tennessee	Frost Stadium at Warner Park	UT Tyler ^{(2)}	2–0	Tampa
2026	Chattanooga, Tennessee	Frost Stadium at Warner Park	Saint Leo ^{(1)}	2–0	McKendree
2027	Chattanooga, Tennessee	Frost Stadium at Warner Park			
2028	Chattanooga, Tennessee	Frost Stadium at Warner Park			

== Champions ==
=== Active programs ===
Team	Titles	Years
UT Tyler	2	2024, 2025
North Georgia	2	2015, 2023
West Texas A&M	2	2014, 2021
Augustana (SD)	2	1991, 2019
Lock Haven	2	2006, 2009
Cal Poly Humboldt	2	1999, 2008
California (PA)	2	1998, 1999
Saint Leo	1	2026
Rogers State	1	2022
Minnesota State	1	2017
Central Oklahoma	1	2013
Valdosta State	1	2012
Hawaii Pacific	1	2010
Angelo State	1	2004
St. Mary's (TX)	1	2002
Florida Southern	1	1993
Missouri Southern	1	1992

=== Former programs ===
Team	Titles	Years
Cal State Northridge	4	1983, 1984, 1985, 1987
Cal State Bakersfield	3	1988, 1989, 1990
Kennesaw State	2	1995, 1996
Southern Indiana	1	2018
North Alabama	1	2016
UC San Diego	1	2011
SIU Edwardsville	1	2007
UC Davis	1	2003
Omaha	1	2001
North Dakota State	1	2000
Merrimack	1	1994
Stephen F. Austin	1	1987
Sam Houston	1	1982

== See also ==
- College softball
- NCAA Division I softball tournament
- NCAA Division III softball tournament
- NAIA Softball Championship
- AIAW Intercollegiate Women's Softball Champions
- NCAA Division II baseball tournament
