= 1995 NCAA Division II softball tournament =

- Format: Double-elimination tournament
- Finals site: James I. Moyer Sports Complex; Salem, Virginia
- Champions: Kennesaw State (1st title)
- Runner-up: Bloomsburg (2nd title game)
- Winning coach: Scott Whitlock (1st title)
- Attendance: 4,997

The 1995 NCAA Division II softball tournament was the 14th annual postseason tournament hosted by the NCAA to determine the national champion of softball among its Division II members in the United States, held at the end of the 1995 NCAA Division II softball season.

The final, six-team double elimination tournament, also known as the Division II Women's College World Series, was played at the James I. Moyer Sports Complex in Salem, Virginia.

Emerging from the consolation bracket, Kennesaw State defeated Bloomsburg in both games of the double elimination championship series, 3–0 and 3–2 (after 8 innings), to capture the Owls' first Division II national title.

== Bracket ==
=== Finals ===
First rounds'
Merrimack | 5
Nebraska–Omaha | 1
Kennesaw State | 3
Wisconsin–Parkside | 4 ^{(8)}
First rounds'
Merrimack | 3
Kennesaw State | 4
Wisconsin–Parkside | 4
Nebraska–Omaha | 2

Second rounds
Humboldt State | 2
Merrimack | 1
Bloomsburg | 8
Wisconsin–Parkside | 2
Second rounds
Kennesaw State | 9^{(5)}
Wisconsin–Parkside | 1

Semifinals
Humboldt State | 1
Bloomsburg | 2
Semifinals
Humboldt State | 2
Kennesaw State | 4

Championship series
Bloomsburg | 0 | 2
Kennesaw State | 3 | 3^{(8)}

== All-tournament team ==
- Jennifer Fritz, 1B, Humboldt State
- Nada Hlohovsky, 2B, Kennesaw State
- Jen LeFever, SS, Bloomsburg
- Tonya Carlisle, 3B, Kennesaw State
- Shannon McDonough, OF, Kennesaw State
- Michelle LeFebvre, OF, Merrimack
- Emily Brown, OF, Bloomsburg
- April Paoli, P, Bloomsburg
- Kelly Rafter, P, Kennesaw State
- Colleen Thorburn, C, Kennesaw State
- Cara Dornstauder, DP, Kennesaw State
- Jackie Aiken, AL, Wisconsin–Parkside
- Paige Wofford, AL, Kennesaw State

== See also ==
- 1995 NCAA Division I softball tournament
- 1995 NCAA Division III softball tournament
- 1995 NAIA softball tournament
- 1995 NCAA Division II baseball tournament
