= 1995 NAIA World Series =

1995 NAIA baseball tournament
- 1995 NAIA World Series
- Teams: 8
- Format: Double elimination Page playoff
- Finals site: Lewis and Clark Park; Sioux City, Iowa
- Champions: Bellevue (NE) (1st title)
- Winning coach: Mike Evans
- MVP: Nic DeLuca (SS) (Bellevue (NE))

The 1995 NAIA World Series was the 39th annual tournament hosted by the National Association of Intercollegiate Athletics to determine the national champion of baseball among its member colleges and universities in the United States and Canada.

The tournament was played for at Lewis and Clark Park in Sioux City, Iowa. This was the first tournament played in Sioux City since 1961.

Emerging out of the consolation bracket, Bellevue (57–13) defeated Cumberland (TN) (49–19) in a single-game championship series, 8–5, to win the Bruins' first NAIA World Series.

Bellevue short-stop Nic DeLuca was named tournament MVP.

== Bracket ==
Upper round 1
Saint Francis (IL) | 7
Saint Mary's (TX) | 6
Cumberland (TN) | 3
SE Oklahoma State | 0
Lewis–Clark State (F/7) | 10
Wilmington (DE) | 0
Bellevue (NE) | 1
Birmingham–Southern | 2

Upper round 2
Saint Francis | 1
Cumberland | 5
Lewis–Clark State (F/12) | 11
Birmingham–Southern | 6
Lower round 1
Wilmington | 6
Bellevue | 9
Saint Mary's | 4
SE Oklahoma State | 5

Upper final
Cumberland | 4
Lewis–Clark State | 0
Lower round 2
Saint Francis | 9
Bellevue (11 inn.) | 11
Birmingham–Southern | 10
SE Oklahoma State | 3

Semifinals
Cumberland | 2
Birmingham–Southern | 3
Lewis–Clark State | 7
Bellevue | 8

Preliminary final
Birmingham–Southern | 5
Bellevue | 7

Final
Cumberland | 5
Bellevue | 8

== See also ==
- 1995 NCAA Division I baseball tournament
- 1995 NCAA Division II baseball tournament
- 1995 NCAA Division III baseball tournament
- 1995 NAIA Softball World Series
