= 1997 NCAA Division II softball tournament =

- Format: Double-elimination tournament
- Finals site: James I. Moyer Sports Complex; Salem, Virginia
- Champions: California (PA) (1st title)
- Runner-up: Wisconsin–Parkside (1st title game)
- Winning coach: Rick Bertagnolli (1st title)
- Attendance: 5,007

The 1997 NCAA Division II softball tournament was the 16th annual postseason tournament hosted by the NCAA to determine the national champion of softball among its Division II members in the United States, held at the end of the 1997 NCAA Division II softball season.

The final, eight-team double elimination tournament, also known as the Division II Women's College World Series, was played at the James I. Moyer Sports Complex in Salem, Virginia.

California (PA) won five consecutive games and defeated Wisconsin–Parkside in the only game of the championship series, 2–1, to capture the Vulcans' first Division II national title.

== Bracket ==
=== College World Series ===
First Round
Kennesaw State	1
Wisconsin–Parkside	7
California (PA)	5
Florida Southern	0
Nebraska–Kearney	1
Nebraska–Omaha	2
American International	0
UC Davis	1

Second Rounda
Wisconsin–Parkside	0
California	1
Nebraska–Omaha	1
UC Davis	3
Second Round
Kennesaw State	8 ^{(5)}
Florida Southern	0
Nebraska–Kearney	1
American International	5

Third Round
California	1
UC Davis	0
Third Round
Nebraska–Omaha	5
Kennesaw State	3
Wisconsin–Parkside	5
American International	4

Semifinals
California	2
Nebraska–Omaha	0
UC Davis	0
Wisconsin–Parkside	3

Third place final
California	2
Wisconsin–Parkside	1

== All-tournament team ==
- Holly Voss, 1B, Nebraska–Omaha
- Jill McCaslin, 2B, Nebraska–Kearney
- Stacy Squires, SS, American International
- Lith Webb, 3B, California (PA)
- Beth Clifford, OF, UC Davis
- Kathy Kilsdonk, OF, UC Davis
- Kerry Novak, OF, California (PA)
- Danielle Penner, P, California (PA)
- Wendy Wolff, P, Wisconsin–Parkside
- Kim O’Kelly, C, Kennesaw State
- Keri Weaver, DP, California (PA)
- Gena Weber, AL, UC Davis
- Jackie Aiken, AL, Wisconsin–Parkside

== See also ==
- 1997 NCAA Division I softball tournament
- 1997 NCAA Division III softball tournament
- 1997 NAIA softball tournament
- 1997 NCAA Division II baseball tournament
