= 1994 NCAA Division II softball tournament =

- Format: Double-elimination tournament
- Finals site: Shawnee, Kansas
- Champions: Merrimack (1st title)
- Runner-up: Humboldt State (1st title game)
- Winning coach: Michele Myslinski (1st title)
- Attendance: 3,843

The 1994 NCAA Division II softball tournament was the 13th annual postseason tournament hosted by the NCAA to determine the national champion of softball among its Division II members in the United States, held at the end of the 1994 NCAA Division II softball season.

The final, six-team double elimination tournament, also known as the Division II Women's College World Series, was played in Shawnee, Kansas.

Emerging from the winner's bracket, Merrimack defeated Humboldt State in the only game of the double elimination championship series, 6–2, to capture the Warriors' first Division II national title.

== Bracket ==
=== Finals ===
First rounds'
Barry	1
Merrimack	5
California (PA)	4
Central Missouri State	7
First rounds'
Central Missouri State	7
Barry	1
Humboldt State	4
California (PA)	2

Second rounds
Humboldt State	2
Merrimack	7
Nebraska–Omaha	8
Central Missouri State	5
Second rounds
Central Missouri State	1
Humboldt State	4

Semifinals
Merrimack	3
Nebraska–Omaha	1
Semifinals
Nebraska–Omaha	4
Humboldt State	7

Championship series
Merrimack	6
Humboldt State	2

== All-tournament team ==
- Deb Baetsle, 1B, Nebraska–Omaha
- Apple Gomez, 2B, Humboldt State
- Julie Hammer, SS, Central Missouri State
- Michala Lehotak, 3B, Nebraska–Omaha
- Raffaella Paparo, OF, Merrimack
- Stacie Lonquist, OF, Humboldt State
- Anetra Torres, OF, Humboldt State
- Kim Page, P, Merrimack
- Melanie Howard, P, Humboldt State
- Judy O’Connell, C, Merrimack
- Tracy Carey, AL, Nebraska–Omaha
- Jen Wagner, AL, California (PA)

== See also ==
- 1994 NCAA Division I softball tournament
- 1994 NCAA Division III softball tournament
- 1994 NAIA softball tournament
- 1994 NCAA Division II baseball tournament
