= 1998 NCAA Division II softball tournament =

- Format: Double-elimination tournament
- Finals site: Pensacola, Florida
- Champions: California (PA) (2nd title)
- Runner-up: Barry (1st title game)
- Winning coach: Rick Bertagnolli (2nd title)
- Attendance: 5,520

The 1998 NCAA Division II softball tournament was the 17th annual postseason tournament hosted by the NCAA to determine the national champion of softball among its Division II members in the United States, held at the end of the 1998 NCAA Division II softball season.

The final, eight-team double elimination tournament, also known as the Division II Women's College World Series, was played in Pensacola, Florida.

Defending champions California (PA) defeated Barry in the final elimination game of the championship series, 2–1, to capture the Vulcans' second consecutive and second overall Division II national title.

== Bracket ==
=== College World Series ===
First Round
Ferris State	4
Merrimack	0
Barry	5
Nebraska–Kearney	3
Augustana (SD)	1
California (PA)	3
Cal State Bakersfield	0
Coker	1

Second Rounda
Ferris State	2
Barry	4
California	2
Coker	1
Second Round
Merrimack	7
Nebraska–Kearney	3
Augustana	1
Cal State Bakersfield	2

Third Round
Barry	0
California	5
Third Round
Coker	1
Merrimack	9 ^{(6)}
Ferris State	5
Cal State Bakersfield	3

Semifinals
California	3
Ferris State	4
Barry	8
Merrimack	4

Third place final
Ferris State	5
Barry	6

Championship
California	2
Barry	1

== All-tournament team ==
- Ramona Romero, 1B, Cal State Bakersfield
- Darcie Berry, 2B, Nebraska–Kearney
- Cindy Perantoni, SS, Barry
- Lith Webb, 3B, California (PA)
- Jenny Bouchard, OF, Barry
- Michelle Tabarez, OF, Cal State Bakersfield
- Casey Munger, OF, Ferris State
- Danielle Penner, P, California (PA)
- Stephanie Caldwell, P, Barry
- Dana Boyer, C, California (PA)
- Julie Phipps, DP, Merrimack
- Nadine Crowl, AL, Ferris State
- Karen White, AL, Coker

== See also ==
- 1998 NCAA Division I softball tournament
- 1998 NCAA Division III softball tournament
- 1998 NAIA softball tournament
- 1998 NCAA Division II baseball tournament
