= 2018 UC Davis Aggies softball team =

American college softball season

2018 UC Davis Aggies softball
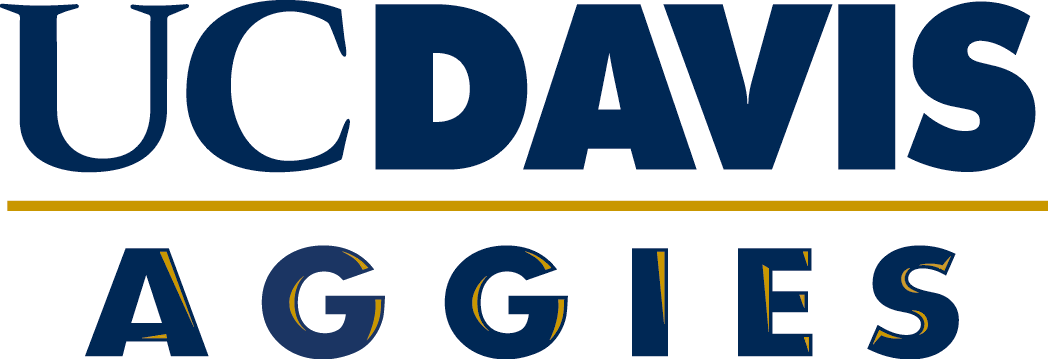
- Conference: Big West Conference
- Record: 27–24 (9–12 Big West)
- Head coach: Erin Thorpe (4th season)
- Home stadium: La Rue Field

2018 Big West Conference softball standings
| | Conf. | | | | Overall |
| Team | W | | L | PCT | W | | L | PCT |
|---|---|---|---|---|---|---|---|---|
| Cal State Fullerton ‍†‍‍^{y} | 18 | – | 3 | .857 | 37 | – | 23 | .617 |
| Long Beach State ‍‍‍ | 16 | – | 5 | .762 | 43 | – | 14 | .754 |
| UC Riverside ‍‍‍ | 10 | – | 11 | .476 | 40 | – | 22 | .645 |
| UC Davis ‍‍‍ | 9 | – | 12 | .429 | 27 | – | 24 | .529 |
| Cal Poly ‍‍‍ | 9 | – | 12 | .429 | 26 | – | 25 | .510 |
| Cal State Northridge ‍‍‍ | 8 | – | 13 | .381 | 23 | – | 36 | .390 |
| Hawaii ‍‍‍ | 7 | – | 14 | .333 | 22 | – | 27 | .449 |
| UC Santa Barbara ‍‍‍ | 7 | – | 14 | .333 | 20 | – | 34 | .370 |
† – Conference champion y – Invited to the NCAA tournament As of May 20, 2018; Rankings from NFCA

The 2018 UC Davis Aggies softball team represented the University of California, Davis in the 2018 NCAA Division I softball season. The Aggies were coached by Erin Thorpe in her fourth season, playing their home games at La Rue Field. They finished 27–24 overall and tied for fourth place in the Big West Conference with a 9–12 record.

Freshman pitcher Brooke Yanez was named the Big West Freshman Pitcher of the Year after she posted a 15–11 record, a 1.75 ERA and 190 strikeouts in 187.2 innings. She was profiled in a ESPNW.com feature on freshman starting pitchers in February, and both Yanez and freshman utility player Alyse Rojas earned first-team all-conference honors at the conclusion of the season.

The Aggies set numerous single-season Division I program records during the season. As a team, they established new records in wins (27), winning percentage (.529), and fielding percentage (.969). Individually, Yanez set a new mark in ERA while Rojas set a new record in batting average (.372).

It was the first winning season, and highest win total, since the program transitioned to the Division I level in 2008.

== Previous season ==
The Aggies finished the 2017 season 22–32 overall, 7–14 in Big West play to finish eighth in the conference.

== Preseason ==
=== Big West Conference coaches poll ===
The Big West Conference coaches poll was released on February 1, 2018. UC Davis was picked to finish eighth in the Big West Conference with 12 votes.

Coaches poll
| Predicted finish | Team | Votes (1st place) |
| 1 | Cal State Fullerton | 57 (4) |
| 2 | Long Beach State | 53 (3) |
| 3 | Cal State Northridge | 43 |
| 4 | Hawai'i | 32 |
| 5 | UC Riverside | 31 (1) |
| 6 | Cal Poly | 31 |
| 7 | UC Santa Barbara | 29 |
| 8 | UC Davis | 12 |

== Roster ==
2018 UC Davis Aggies roster
| Pitchers: 1 Katie Kibby – Sophomore; 18 Sara Cadona – Junior; 20 Brooke Yanez – Freshman; Outfielders: 6 Marisa Given – Sophomore; 29 Megan Salazar – (redshirt) Junior; 44 Caroline Figueroa – Junior; 48 Marissa Jauregui – Sophomore | Catchers: 12 Katie Steffen-Brune – Freshman; 14 Riley Siegel – Freshman; Infielders: 4 Kiana Lee – Freshman; 7 Alex Sotomayor – (redshirt) Junior; 11 Shelby Soares – Freshman; 13 Aly Gomonet – Freshman; 21 Ashley Lotoszynski – Senior; 24 Meghan Bradbury – Junior; 33 Lulu Gargicevich-Almeida – Sophomore | Utility: 8 Maddie Rojas – Sophomore; 10 Frankie Mendoza – Sophomore; 16 Autumn Miller – Junior; 22 Alyse Rojas – Freshman; 27 Alexis Villalobos – Sophomore; 28 Isabella Leon – Sophomore |

== Schedule ==
Legend
| | UC Davis win |
| | UC Davis loss |
| * | Non-Conference game |

2018 UC Davis Aggies Softball Game Log
Regular season (27–24)

February (11–7)
| Date | Opponent | Site/stadium | Score | Win | Loss | Save | Attendance | Overall record | Big West Record |
|---|---|---|---|---|---|---|---|---|---|
| Feb 9 | South Dakota* | Tempe Sports Complex • Tempe, AZ | W 3–1 | Yanez (1–0) | Devers (0–2) | None | 350 | 1–0 | |
| Feb 10 | #12 Tennessee* | Tempe Sports Complex • Tempe, AZ | L 0–6 | Arnold (1–0) | Mendoza (0–1) | None | 45 | 1–1 | |
| Feb 10 | #7 Arizona* | Tempe Sports Complex • Tempe, AZ | L 1–6 | Denham (1–0) | Kibby (0–1) | None | 416 | 1–2 | |
| Feb 11 | UTEP* | Tempe Sports Complex • Tempe, AZ | W 12–4^{6} | Mendoza (1–1) | Cretz (0–2) | None | 124 | 2–2 | |
| Feb 11 | San Diego State* | Tempe Sports Complex • Tempe, AZ | W 3–2^{9} | Yanez (2–0) | Formby (0–3) | None | 350 | 3–2 | |
| Feb 14 | at #23 California* | Levine-Fricke Field • Berkeley, CA | L 0–1 | Conley (3–0) | Yanez (2–1) | None | 224 | 3–3 | |
| Feb 16 | Pacific* | Margie Wright Diamond • Fresno, CA | L 6–9 | Walters (2–1) | Cadona (0–1) | None | 151 | 3–4 | |
| Feb 16 | at Fresno State* | Margie Wright Diamond • Fresno, CA | W 2–0 | Yanez (3–1) | East (3–2) | None | 1,105 | 4–4 | |
| Feb 17 | Cal State Bakersfield* | Margie Wright Diamond • Fresno, CA | W 7–3 | Yanez (4–1) | Evans (0–6) | None | 130 | 5–4 | |
| Feb 17 | Saint Mary's* | Margie Wright Diamond • Fresno, CA | W 4–1 | Kibby (1–1) | Whitt (0–3) | None | 144 | 6–4 | |
| Feb 18 | Pacific* | Margie Wright Diamond • Fresno, CA | W 3–0 | Yanez (5–1) | Young (2–1) | None | 101 | 7–4 | |
| Feb 23 | #11 Tennessee* | Big League Dreams • Cathedral City, CA | L 0–7 | Moss (7–1) | Kibby (1–2) | None | 245 | 7–5 | |
| Feb 23 | Liberty* | Big League Dreams • Cathedral City, CA | L 1–4 | Dimartino (6–1) | Yanez (5–2) | None | 101 | 7–6 | |
| Feb 24 | #18 Oklahoma State* | Big League Dreams • Cathedral City, CA | W 3–1 | Yanez (6–2) | Robertson (4–3) | None | | 8–6 | |
| Feb 25 | St. John's* | Big League Dreams • Cathedral City, CA | W 4–3 | Yanez (7–2) | Murray (1–4) | None | 127 | 9–6 | |
| Feb 25 | San Diego State* | Big League Dreams • Cathedral City, CA | W 2–0 | Kibby (2–2) | Moreno (2–3) | None | 127 | 10–6 | |
| Feb 28 | at Saint Mary's* | Cottrell Field • Moraga, CA | L 5–7 | Whitt (3–4) | Mendoza (1–2) | None | 76 | 10–7 | |
| Feb 28 | at Saint Mary's* | Cottrell Field • Moraga, CA | W 8–0^{5} | Kibby (3–2) | Perez (1–5) | None | 70 | 11–7 | |

March (9–5)
| Date | Opponent | Site/stadium | Score | Win | Loss | Save | Attendance | Overall record | Big West Record |
|---|---|---|---|---|---|---|---|---|---|
| Mar 8 | vs Nevada* | La Rue Field • Davis, CA | W 9–4 | Yanez (8–2) | Jensen (6–5) | None | | 12–7 | |
| Mar 8 | vs Utah State* | La Rue Field • Davis, CA | L 0–2 | Hull (4–1) | Kibby (3–3) | None | 247 | 12–8 | |
| Mar 10 | vs Utah State* | La Rue Field • Davis, CA | W 3–1 | Yanez (9–2) | White (4–4) | None | | 13–8 | |
| Mar 10 | vs Valparaiso* | La Rue Field • Davis, CA | L 0–4 | Grossmann (8–2) | Kibby (3–4) | Richardson (2) | | 13–9 | |
| Mar 11 | vs Valparaiso* | La Rue Field • Davis, CA | W 5–1 | Yanez (10–2) | Montgomery (2–5) | None | 278 | 14–9 | |
| Mar 12 | vs Northern Colorado* | La Rue Field • Davis, CA | W 2–1^{9} | Kibby (4–4) | Paige (2–4) | None | | 15–9 | |
| Mar 12 | vs Northern Colorado* | La Rue Field • Davis, CA | L 0–1 | Vidal (9–4) | Yanez (10–3) | None | 85 | 15–10 | |
| Mar 16 | vs Fairleigh Dickinson* | La Rue Field • Davis, CA | W 3–1 | Kibby (5–4) | Johnson (1–5) | None | | 16–10 | |
| Mar 16 | vs Santa Clara | La Rue Field • Davis, CA | W 6–1 | Yanez (11–3) | Vierra (2–8) | None | 317 | 17–10 | |
| Mar 18 | vs Fairleigh Dickinson | La Rue Field • Davis, CA | L 1–2 | England (3–3) | Yanez (11–4) | Johnson (2) | | 17–11 | |
| Mar 18 | vs Santa Clara | La Rue Field • Davis, CA | W 7–0 | Kibby (6–4) | Portis (2–7) | None | | 18–11 | |
| Mar 30 | at Cal State Northridge | Matador Diamond • Los Angeles, CA | L 3–4 | James (7–11) | Kibby (6–5) | None | 122 | 18–12 | 0–1 |
| Mar 31 | at Cal State Northridge | Matador Diamond • Los Angeles, CA | W 6–3 | Yanez (12–4) | Troost (7–9) | None | 444 | 19–12 | 1–1 |
| Mar 31 | at Cal State Northridge | Matador Diamond • Los Angeles, CA | W 8–0^{5} | Kibby (7–5) | James (7–12) | None | 535 | 20–12 | 2–1 |

April (4–9)
| Date | Opponent | Site/stadium | Score | Win | Loss | Save | Attendance | Overall record | Big West Record |
|---|---|---|---|---|---|---|---|---|---|
| Apr 7 | vs UC Santa Barbara | La Rue Field • Davis, CA | W 2–0 | Kibby (8–5) | Schuttish (2–3) | None | 386 | 21–12 | 3–1 |
| Apr 8 | vs UC Santa Barbara | La Rue Field • Davis, CA | L 1–2 | Noriega (4–5) | Yanez (12–5) | None | | 21–13 | 3–2 |
| Apr 8 | vs UC Santa Barbara | La Rue Field • Davis, CA | L 0–4 | Schuttish (3–3) | Kibby (8–6) | None | 74 | 21–14 | 3–3 |
| Apr 14 | at Cal Poly | Bob Janssen Field • San Luis Obispo, CA | L 0–1 | Chalmers (13–7) | Yanez (12–6) | None | 257 | 21–15 | 3–4 |
| Apr 14 | at Cal Poly | Bob Janssen Field • San Luis Obispo, CA | W 1–0 | Kibby (9–6) | Casper (1–7) | None | 257 | 22–15 | 4–4 |
| Apr 15 | at Cal Poly | Bob Janssen Field • San Luis Obispo, CA | L 1–6 | Chalmers (14–7) | Yanez (12–7) | None | 417 | 22–16 | 4–5 |
| Apr 21 | vs UC Riverside | La Rue Field • Davis, CA | W 3–2^{8} | Yanez (13–7) | Dolcini (11–7) | None | | 23–16 | 5–5 |
| Apr 21 | vs UC Riverside | La Rue Field • Davis, CA | W 9–2 | Kibby (10–6) | Misfeldt (14–10) | None | 297 | 24–16 | 6–5 |
| Apr 22 | vs UC Riverside | La Rue Field • Davis, CA | L 2–3 | Yanez (13–8) | Dolcini (12–7) | None | 273 | 24–17 | 6–6 |
| Apr 25 | vs California* | La Rue Field • Davis, CA | L 2–3^{8} | Conley (13–10) | Kibby (10–7) | None | 192 | 24–18 | |
| Apr 28 | at Cal State Fullerton | Anderson Family Field • Fullerton, CA | L 2–4 | Frost (12–5) | Yanez (13–9) | None | | 24–19 | 6–7 |
| Apr 28 | at Cal State Fullerton | Anderson Family Field • Fullerton, CA | L 2–3 | Parks (7–2) | Kibby (10–8) | None | 232 | 24–20 | 6–8 |
| Apr 29 | at Cal State Fullerton | Anderson Family Field • Fullerton, CA | L 6–8 | Frost (13–5) | Kibby (10–9) | None | 365 | 24–21 | 6–9 |

May (3–3)
| Date | Opponent | Site/stadium | Score | Win | Loss | Save | Attendance | Overall record | Big West Record |
|---|---|---|---|---|---|---|---|---|---|
| May 5 | vs #17 Long Beach State | La Rue Field • Davis, CA | W 2–1^{12} | Yanez (14–9) | Flores (9–2) | None | | 25–21 | 7–9 |
| May 5 | vs #17 Long Beach State | La Rue Field • Davis, CA | L 0–8^{6} | Meza (21–4) | Kibby (10–10) | None | 102 | 25–22 | 7–10 |
| May 6 | vs #17 Long Beach State | La Rue Field • Davis, CA | L 0–4 | Magnett (10–5) | Yanez (14–10) | None | 281 | 25–23 | 7–11 |
| May 11 | vs Hawaii | La Rue Field • Davis, CA | L 0–6 | Thomsen (15–15) | Yanez (14–11) | None | 87 | 25–24 | 7–12 |
| May 12 | vs Hawaii | La Rue Field • Davis, CA | W 6–0 | Kibby (11–10) | Thomsen (15–16) | None | | 26–24 | 8–12 |
| May 12 | vs Hawaii | La Rue Field • Davis, CA | W 5–0 | Yanez (15–11) | Klee (2–2) | None | 179 | 27–24 | 9–12 |

== Awards and honors ==
Weekly Awards
| Player | Award | Date Awarded | Ref. |
|---|---|---|---|
| Brooke Yanez | Big West Pitcher of the Week | February 13, 2018 | |
| Brooke Yanez | Big West Pitcher of the Week | February 20, 2018 | |
| Alyse Rojas | Big West Player of the Week | April 3, 2018 | |
| Brooke Yanez | Big West Pitcher of the Week | May 8, 2018 | |

Individual Awards
| Player | Award | Ref. |
|---|---|---|
| Brooke Yanez | Big West Freshman Pitcher of the Year | |

All-Big West
| Player | Selection | Ref. |
|---|---|---|
| Alyse Rojas | First team | |
| Brooke Yanez | First team | |
| Katie Kibby | Honorable mention | |
| Isabella Leon | Honorable mention | |
| Alyse Rojas | All-Freshman | |
| Brooke Yanez | All-Freshman | |

NFCA All-Pacific Region
| Player | Selection | Ref. |
|---|---|---|
| Brooke Yanez | Second team | |
