= 1995 NCAA Division II baseball tournament =

- Season: 1995
- Finals site: Paterson Field; Montgomery, Alabama
- Champions: Florida Southern (8th title)
- Runner-up: Georgia College (1st CWS Appearance)
- Winning coach: Chuck Anderson (3rd title)
- MOP: Brett Tomko, P (Florida Southern)
- Attendance: 11,961

The 1995 NCAA Division II baseball tournament was the postseason tournament hosted by the NCAA to determine the national champion of baseball among its Division II members at the end of the 1995 NCAA Division II baseball season.

The final, eight-team double elimination tournament, also known as the College World Series, was again played at Paterson Field in Montgomery, Alabama.

Florida Southern defeated Georgia College, 15–0, in the championship game, claiming the Moccasins' eighth Division II national title.

== Bracket ==
=== College World Series ===
First Round
Bloomsburg	0
Florida Southern	7
Ashland	3
Valdosta State	9
New Haven	4
Central Missouri State	9
UC Davis	12
New Haven	9
Central Missouri State	3
Georgia College	19
Bloomsburg	9
Ashland	4

Second Round
Florida Southern	9
Valdosta State	5
UC Davis	8
Central Missouri State	15
UC Davis	4
Georgia College	10
Valdosta State	9
Bloomsburg	2

Semifinals
Florida Southern	9
Central Missouri State	7
Georgia College	9
Valdosta State	7

Championship
Florida Southern	15
Georgia College	0

== See also ==
- 1995 NCAA Division I baseball tournament
- 1995 NCAA Division III baseball tournament
- 1995 NAIA World Series
- 1995 NCAA Division II softball tournament
