= 1996 NAIA World Series =

1996 NAIA baseball tournament
- 1996 NAIA World Series
- Teams: 8
- Format: Double elimination Page playoff
- Finals site: Lewis and Clark Park; Sioux City, Iowa
- Champions: Lewis–Clark State (9th title)
- Winning coach: Ed Cheff
- MVP: Troy Silva (1B) (Lewis–Clark State)

The 1996 NAIA World Series was the 40th annual tournament hosted by the National Association of Intercollegiate Athletics to determine the national champion of baseball among its member colleges and universities in the United States and Canada.

The tournament was played for at Lewis and Clark Park in Sioux City, Iowa.

Lewis–Clark State (53–11) defeated Saint Ambrose (42–19) in a single-game championship series, 9–0, to win the Warriors' ninth NAIA World Series and first since 1992.

Lewis–Clark State first baseman Troy Silva was named tournament MVP.

== Bracket ==
=== Preliminary ===
First round Losers to Championship Bracket, Second Round
Cumberland (TN)	2
St. Thomas (FL)	1
Geneva	1
Lewis–Clark State	2
Ohio Dominican (7 inn.)	12
Oklahoma Baptist	2
Saint Ambrose	2
St. Mary's (TX)	0

Second round Losers to Championship Bracket, Third Round
Cumberland	4
Lewis–Clark State	9
Ohio Dominican	5
Saint Ambrose	16

Third round Both teams to Championship Bracket, Semifinals
Lewis–Clark State	3
Saint Ambrose	1

=== Championship ===
Second round Losers eliminated
St. Thomas	4
Geneva	3
Oklahoma Baptist	0
St. Mary's	7

Third round Losers eliminated
Ohio Dominican	4
St. Thomas	7
Cumberland	3
St. Mary's	1

Semifinals; Losers eliminated
Lewis–Clark State	4
St. Thomas	2
Saint Ambrose	9
Cumberland	8

Championship
Lewis–Clark State	9	–
Saint Ambrose	0	–

== See also ==
- 1996 NCAA Division I baseball tournament
- 1996 NCAA Division II baseball tournament
- 1996 NCAA Division III baseball tournament
- 1996 NAIA Softball World Series
