= Hamer Hall (California University of Pennsylvania) =

Arena in California, Pennsylvania

Coordinates: 40.06397°N 79.88241°W

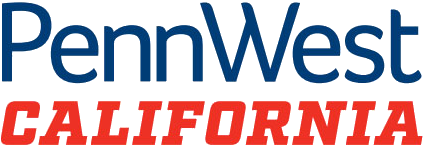

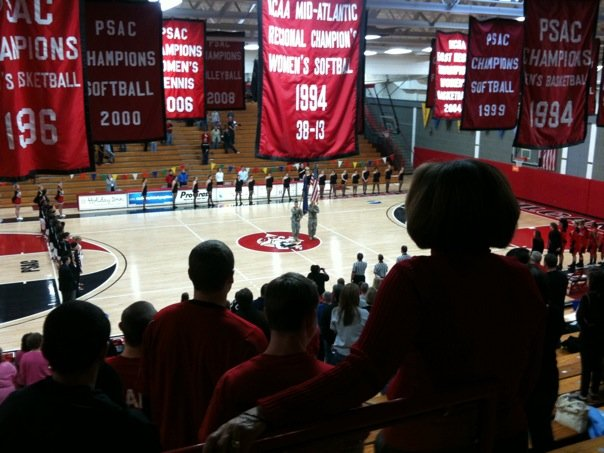
- The arena during a basketball game
- Interactive map of Hamer Hall
- Location: PennWest California, California, Pennsylvania
- Owner: Pennsylvania Western University
- Operator: PennWest California
- Capacity: 3,500
- Surface: Hardwood

Construction
- Built: 1965
- Renovated: 2000

Tenant
- California Vulcans

Website
- calvulcans.com/hamer-hall

Hamer Hall is a multi-purpose arena located on the campus of Pennsylvania Western University California (known before July 2022 as California University of Pennsylvania) in California, Pennsylvania. The 17,000 square foot building was named for James E. Hamer, a former trustee of the university. It opened in 1965 and underwent a $6.3 million renovation in 1999.

The building is the home to California's athletic offices, varsity arena, natatorium, weight room, training room, classrooms, and other facilities used by Vulcan student-athletes and the campus community. Hamer Hall's hardwood court is the current home of the California Vulcans men's and women's basketball and volleyball teams, while adjacent to the main arena, the first floor includes 10 locker rooms and the main athletic equipment room.

Cal's six-lane, 25-yard competition pool, also used for classes and recreation, has several locker rooms, new scoreboards and record boards, as well as the head coach's office and gallery seating for 250. The second floor features the main athletic office and space for all the varsity programs. In addition, the University's sports management program office is located in Hamer Hall.

In the past, the building was the default location for commencement ceremonies; however, Hamer Hall ceased to host most sporting events and commencement ceremonies when the Convocation Center opened in fall 2011, ending Hamer Hall's 46-year tenure as Cal U's home court. Hamer Hall was rededicated in 2000, with the renovation and construction of a new "Alumni Room".
