= Convocation Center =

Convocation Center may refer to:

- California University of Pennsylvania Convocation Center, arena on the campus of Pennsylvania Western University
- Convocation Center (Eastern Michigan University), arena on the campus of Eastern Michigan University
- Convocation Center (Northern Illinois University), arena on the campus of Northern Illinois University
- Convocation Center (Ohio University), arena on the campus of Ohio University
- Convocation Center (University of Texas at San Antonio), arena on the campus of University of Texas at San Antonio
- James Madison University Convocation Center, arena on the campus of James Madison University
- Memorial Athletic and Convocation Center, arena on the campus of Kent State University
- Ted Constant Convocation Center, arena on the campus of Old Dominion University

== Former names ==
- Athletic & Convocation Center, former name of the arena at Notre Dame University, now known as the Edmund P. Joyce Center
- CSU Convocation Center, former name of the arena at Cleveland State University, now known as the Wolstein Center
- UCF Convocation Center, former name of the arena at University of Central Florida, now known as Addition Financial Arena
- University of Miami Convocation Center, former name of the arena at the University of Miami, now known as the Watsco Center
- Youngstown Convocation Center, former name of the arena in Youngstown, Ohio, now known as the Covelli Centre
- Convocation Center, former name of the arena at Arkansas State University, now known as First National Bank Arena
