= Carly Muscaro =

American middle-distance runner (born 1995)

Personal information
- Born: May 18, 1995 (age 31)
- Education: Ashland High School (Massachusetts); Merrimack College
- Height: 164 cm (5 ft 5 in)
- Weight: 54 kg (119 lb)

Sport
- Country: United States
- Sport: Sport of athletics
- Event(s): 400 metres 800 metres
- College team: Merrimack Warriors

Achievements and titles
- National finals: 2014 USA U20s; • 400m, 7th
- Personal bests: 400m: 51.17 (2016); 800m: 2:02.44 (2018)
Medal record
Women's athletics
Representing the United States
NACAC U23 Championships
Gold medal – first place	2016 San Salvador	4 × 400 m relay
- Updated on August 2024

Carly Muscaro (born May 18, 1995) is an American former sprinter and middle-distance runner specializing in the 400 metres. She is a multiple-time NCAA Division II Track and Field Championships winner and competed at the 2016 United States Olympic trials.

== Career ==
Muscaro competed in soccer and track for Ashland High School. She earned Massachusetts Interscholastic Athletic Association all-state status, but did not win any state championship titles. Her high school best time in the 400 metres was just 58.16 seconds.

She committed to the Merrimack Warriors track and field team, then an NCAA Division II program. In her first year with them, she qualified for the 2014 NCAA Division II Women's Indoor Track and Field Championships and placed 2nd at the NCAA Division II Women's Outdoor Track and Field Championships in the 400 metres. At the 2014 USATF U20 Outdoor Championships, Muscaro placed 7th in the 400 m.

Muscaro qualified for and competed at the 2015 USA Indoor Track and Field Championships in the rarely-run 300 metres event. She ran 39.12 seconds to finish 3rd in her heat without advancing to the finals. After a pair of 2nd-place 400 m finishes at the NCAA DII indoor and outdoor nationals, she competed at the 2015 USA Outdoor Track and Field Championships and again failed to make the finals.

Muscaro won her first indoor title at the 2016 NCAA DII indoor championships. In May 2016, Muscaro ran 51.17 for 400 m at the New England Championships. The time ranked her 16th in the world that year. She followed that up by winning the outdoor DII championships, attributing her improvement to coaching, lifting weights, eating better, and having more confidence.

At the 2016 United States Olympic trials, Muscaro qualified for the semifinals with a 52.11-second run. She finished 8th in her semi-final and did not make the 2016 U.S. team. As a consolation, she was selected to represent the U.S. at the 2016 NACAC U23 Championships in Athletics where she won the gold medal in the women's 4 × 400 m relay. She again made the semifinals at the 2017 USA Outdoor Track and Field Championships and finished 7th, not advancing.

In 2018, Muscaro began to focus on the 800 metres, placing 6th with a 2:03.50 at the New Balance Indoor Grand Prix. At the 2018 USA Indoor Track and Field Championships, Muscaro ran 52.68 for 400 m and just failed to qualify for the finals. In her last professional race at the 2018 USA Outdoor Track and Field Championships, Muscaro ran 2:08 in the 800 m first round and failed to advance.

== Personal life ==
Muscaro is from Ashland, Massachusetts where she attended Ashland High School. She is openly lesbian, and has had the same girlfriend since high school supporting her. Muscaro told The Eagle Tribune of it, "Now everybody knows and nobody cares". She hoped to become a state trooper after her running career.

Muscaro studied criminal justice at Merrimack.

== Statistics ==
=== Personal best progression ===
400m progression
#	Mark	Pl.	Competition	Venue	Date	Ref.
1	55.03	3rd place, bronze medalist(s)	NEICAAA Indoor Track & Field Championships	Boston, MA	February 28, 2014	
2	54.29	1st place, gold medalist(s)	Coach P	Bethlehem, PA	April 10, 2014	
3	53.95	1st place, gold medalist(s)	NEICAAA Outdoor Track & Field Championships	Westfield, MA	May 9, 2014	
4	53.93	(silver) (Heat 2)	NCAA Division II Outdoor Championships	Allendale, MI	May 21, 2014	
5	53.43	2nd place, silver medalist(s)	NCAA Division II Outdoor Championships	Allendale, MI	May 23, 2014	
6	52.69	1st place, gold medalist(s)	Outdoor Track & Field Championships	New Haven, CT	May 1, 2015	
7	51.83	1st place, gold medalist(s)	NEICAAA Track and Field Outdoor Championships	Cambridge, MA	May 8, 2015	
8	51.17	1st place, gold medalist(s)	NEICAAA Outdoor Track & Field Championships	New Haven, CT	May 13, 2016	
