= 1996 NCAA Division II softball tournament =

- Format: Double-elimination tournament
- Finals site: Trusler Sports Complex; Emporia, Kansas
- Champions: Kennesaw State (2nd title)
- Runner-up: Nebraska–Omaha (1st title game)
- Winning coach: Scott Whitlock (2nd title)
- Attendance: 2,558

The 1996 NCAA Division II softball tournament was the 15th annual postseason tournament hosted by the NCAA to determine the national champion of softball among its Division II members in the United States, held at the end of the 1996 NCAA Division II softball season.

The final, eight-team double elimination tournament, also known as the Division II Women's College World Series, was played at the Trusler Sports Complex in Emporia, Kansas.

Defending champions Kennesaw State defeated Nebraska–Omaha in the final game of the championship series, 6–4, to capture the Owls' second Division II national title.

== Bracket ==
=== College World Series ===
First Round
Nebraska–Kearney	1 ^{(8)}
UC Davis	0
Florida Southern	1
Kennesaw State	2 ^{(8)}
California (PA)	1 ^{(9)}
Wisconsin–Parkside	0
American International	2
Nebraska–Omaha	3

Second Round
Nebraska–Kearney	0
Kennesaw State	3
California (PA)	1
Nebraska–Omaha	2 ^{(13)}
Second Round
Wisconsin–Parkside	1
American International	2
UC Davis	2
Florida Southern	0

Third Round
Kennesaw State	7
Nebraska–Omaha	1
Third Round
Nebraska–Kearney	1 ^{(8)}
American International	0
California (PA)	0
UC Davis	7

Semifinals
Kennesaw State	1
UC Davis	5
Nebraska–Omaha	2 ^{(8)}
Nebraska–Kearney	1

Third place final
UC Davis	0
Nebraska–Omaha	4

Championship final
Kennesaw State	6
Nebraska–Omaha	4

== All-tournament team ==
- Trisha Reinhardt, 1B, UC Davis
- Jill McCaslin, 2B, Nebraska–Kearney
- Kathy Morgan, SS, Kennesaw State
- Mindy Hahne, 3B, Nebraska–Omaha
- Beth Clifford, OF, UC Davis
- Kristine MacLean, OF, American International
- Jenni Upenieks, OF, Nebraska–Omaha
- Kelly Rafter, P, Kennesaw State
- Denise Peterson, P, Nebraska–Omaha
- Nada Hlohovsky, C, Kennesaw State
- Dana Boyer, AL, California (PA)
- Danielle Penner, AL, California (PA)
- Gena Weber, AL, UC Davis

== See also ==
- 1996 NCAA Division I softball tournament
- 1996 NCAA Division III softball tournament
- 1996 NAIA softball tournament
- 1996 NCAA Division II baseball tournament
