= 1996 NCAA Division III baseball tournament =

- Season: 1996
- Teams: 32
- Finals site: Salem Memorial Ballpark; Salem, Virginia
- Champions: William Paterson (2nd title)
- Runner-up: Cal Lutheran
- MOP: Mark DeMenna (William Paterson)

The 1996 NCAA Division III baseball tournament was played at the end of the 1996 NCAA Division III baseball season to determine the 21st national champion of college baseball at the NCAA Division III level. The tournament concluded with eight teams competing at a new location at Salem Memorial Ballpark in Salem, Virginia, for the championship. Eight regional tournaments were held to determine the participants in the World Series. Regional tournaments were contested in double-elimination format, with one region consisting of six teams, six regions consisting of four teams, and one region consisting of two teams, which was played as best-of-five, for a total of 32 teams participating in the tournament. The tournament champion was William Paterson, who defeated Cal Lutheran for the championship.

== See also ==
- 1996 NCAA Division I baseball tournament
- 1996 NCAA Division II baseball tournament
- 1996 NAIA World Series
