= 1994 NCAA Division II baseball tournament =

- Season: 1994
- Finals site: Paterson Field; Montgomery, Alabama
- Champions: Central Missouri State (1st title)
- Runner-up: Florida Southern (11th CWS Appearance)
- Winning coach: Dave Van Horn (1st title)
- MOP: James Vida, 1B (Florida Southern)
- Attendance: 11,436

The 1994 NCAA Division II baseball tournament was the postseason tournament hosted by the NCAA to determine the national champion of baseball among its Division II colleges and universities at the end of the 1994 NCAA Division II baseball season.

The final, eight-team double elimination tournament, also known as the College World Series, was played at Paterson Field in Montgomery, Alabama.

Central Missouri State defeated Florida Southern, 14–9, in the championship game, the Mules' first Division II national title.

== Bracket ==
=== College World Series ===
First Round
Florida Southern	8^{11}
Springfield	7
Mansfield	4
Delta State	3
UC Riverside	0
Lewis (IL)	5
Central Missouri State	9
UC Riverside	6
Armstrong State	9
Lewis (IL)	5
Springfield	11
Delta State	12^{10}

Second Round
Florida Southern	9
Mansfield	6
Lewis (IL)	4
Armstrong State	3
Central Missouri State	8
Armstrong State	7
Delta State	6
Mansfield	1

Semifinals
Florida Southern	3	8
Lewis (IL)	4	0
Central Missouri State	3	8
Delta State	10	2

Championship
Florida Southern	9
Central Missouri State	14

== See also ==
- 1994 NCAA Division I baseball tournament
- 1994 NCAA Division III baseball tournament
- 1994 NAIA World Series
- 1994 NCAA Division II softball tournament
