= 1994 NAIA World Series =

1994 NAIA baseball tournament
- 1994 NAIA World Series
- Teams: 8
- Format: Double elimination Page playoff
- Finals site: Sec Taylor Stadium; Des Moines, Iowa
- Champions: Kennesaw State (1st title)
- Winning coach: Mike Sansing
- MVP: Todd Kirby (P) (Kennesaw State)

The 1994 NAIA World Series was the 38th annual tournament hosted by the National Association of Intercollegiate Athletics to determine the national champion of baseball among its member colleges and universities in the United States and Canada.

The tournament was played for a third and final time at Sec Taylor Stadium in Des Moines, Iowa.

Kennesaw State (48–14) defeated Southeastern Oklahoma State (50–15) in a single-game championship series, 2–0, to win the Owls' first NAIA World Series. It was also Southeastern's second consecutive loss in the NAIA World Series finals.

Kennesaw State pitcher Todd Kirby was named tournament MVP.

== Bracket ==
=== Preliminary ===
First round Losers to Championship Bracket, Second Round
Kennesaw State	4
Point Loma Nazarene	2
Dallas Baptist	11
Siena Heights	0
SE Oklahoma State	18^{7}
Wilmington (DE)	2
Coker	3
Saint Ambrose	5

Second round Losers to Championship Bracket, Third Round
Kennesaw State	6
Dallas Baptist	4
SE Oklahoma State	10
Saint Ambrose	1

Third round Both teams to Championship Bracket, Semifinals
Kennesaw State	6
SE Oklahoma State	5

=== Championship ===
Second round
Point Loma Nazarene	5
Siena Heights	3
Wilmington (DE)	0
Coker	5

Third round
Saint Ambrose	3
Point Loma Nazarene	2
Dallas Baptist	6
Coker	2

Semifinals
Kennesaw State	6
Saint Ambrose	2
SE Oklahoma State	10
Dallas Baptist	9

Championship
Kennesaw State	2	–
SE Oklahoma State	0

== See also ==
- 1994 NCAA Division I baseball tournament
- 1994 NCAA Division II baseball tournament
- 1994 NCAA Division III baseball tournament
- 1994 NAIA Softball World Series
