= 1996 NCAA Division II baseball tournament =

- Season: 1996
- Finals site: Paterson Field; Montgomery, Alabama
- Champions: Kennesaw State (1st title)
- Runner-up: Saint Joseph's (IN) (1st CWS Appearance)
- Winning coach: Mike Sansing (1st title)
- MOP: Chris Halliday, C (Kennesaw State)
- Attendance: 19,941

The 1996 NCAA Division II baseball tournament was the postseason tournament hosted by the NCAA to determine the national champion of baseball among its Division II members at the end of the 1996 NCAA Division II baseball season.

The final, eight-team double elimination tournament, also known as the College World Series, was again played at Paterson Field in Montgomery, Alabama.

Kennesaw State defeated Saint Joseph's (IN), 4–0, in the championship game, claiming the Owls' first Division II national title.

== Bracket ==
=== College World Series ===
First Round
Kennesaw State	9
Southern Colorado	3
Adelphi	4
Shippensburg	3
UMSL	7
Tampa	9
Saint Joseph's (IN)	20
UMSL	5
Delta State	8
Tampa	4
Southern Colorado	10
Shippensburg	2

Second Round
Kennesaw State	8^{10}
Adelphi	7
Delta State	11
Tampa	10
Saint Joseph's (IN)	7
Delta State	6
Adelphi	5^{10}
Southern Colorado	4

Semifinals
Kennesaw State	3
Delta State	1
Saint Joseph's (IN)	2	8
Adelphi	4	3

Championship
Kennesaw State	4
Saint Joseph's (IN)	0

== See also ==
- 1996 NCAA Division I baseball tournament
- 1996 NCAA Division III baseball tournament
- 1996 NAIA World Series
- 1996 NCAA Division II softball tournament
