= 1994 NCAA Division III baseball tournament =

- Season: 1994
- Teams: 32
- Finals site: C. O. Brown Stadium; Battle Creek, Michigan
- Champions: Wisconsin-Oshkosh (2nd title)
- Runner-up: Wesleyan
- MOP: Tim Jorgensen (Wisconsin-Oshkosh)

The 1994 NCAA Division III baseball tournament was played at the end of the 1994 NCAA Division III baseball season to determine the 19th national champion of college baseball at the NCAA Division III level. The tournament concluded with eight teams competing at C. O. Brown Stadium in Battle Creek, Michigan, for the championship. Eight regional tournaments were held to determine the participants in the World Series. Regional tournaments were contested in double-elimination format, with one region consisting of six teams, six regions consisting of four teams, and one region consisting of two teams, which was played as best-of-five, for a total of 32 teams participating in the tournament. The tournament champion was Wisconsin-Oshkosh, who defeated Wesleyan for the championship.

== See also ==
- 1994 NCAA Division I baseball tournament
- 1994 NCAA Division II baseball tournament
- 1994 NCAA Division I softball tournament
- 1994 NAIA World Series
