= Convocation Center at PennWest California =

Arena in Pennsylvania, United States

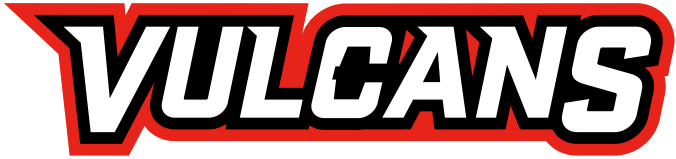

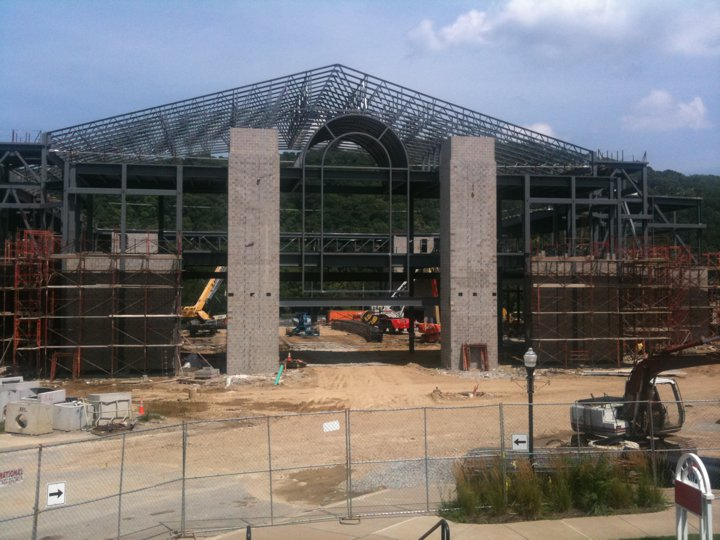
- The Convocation Center under construction, July 2010
- Interactive map of Convocation Center at PennWest California
- Address: California, PA; United States
- Coordinates: 40.0631452°N 79.8817635°W
- Owner: Pennsylvania Western University
- Operator: Pennsylvania Western University California
- Capacity: 4,000
- Type: Arena
- Surface: Hardwood
- Scoreboard: Daktronics
- Field size: 142,000 square feet (13,200 m^{2})
- Current use: Basketball

Construction
- Groundbreaking: August 5, 2009
- Opened: December 3, 2011; 14 years ago
- Cost: USD $ 59 Million
- Architects: L. Robert Kimball & Associates
- General contractor: The Whiting-Turner Contracting Company
- Main contractors: WG Tomko, Inc., A-1 Electric Service, Inc., Ryco, Inc., Wayne Crouse, Inc.,

Tenant
- California Vulcans basketball

Website
- pennwest.edu/convocation-center

The Convocation Center at PennWest California (formerly the California University of Pennsylvania Convocation Center) is a multi-purpose arena at PennWest California in California, Pennsylvania, United States. The arena is the home of the California Vulcans men and women's basketball and volleyball teams, as well as the host of graduation commencement. The Convocation Center is able to host other sporting events, concerts, and trade shows, featuring a removable hardwood surface. The building, covering over 142,000 sq. feet, is the largest indoor venue between Morgantown, West Virginia, and Pittsburgh, Pennsylvania. The Cal U Convocation Center is also home to the "Rivers Bend Conference Center," which features executive-level conferencing facilities. Also included in the venue are "smart" classrooms, configurable for large or small-group presentations, high-tech audio and visual systems, wireless Internet access, webcams, videoconferencing equipment, and interactive response systems. The building replaces the Vulcans previous basketball and volleyball arena, Hamer Hall, which opened its doors in 1965.

== Construction and opening ==
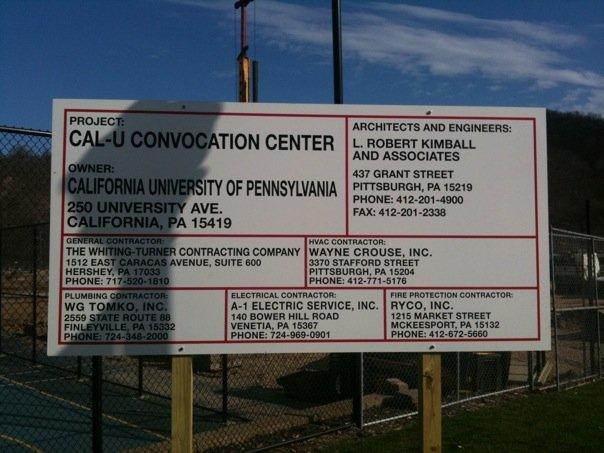
The construction sign for the Convocation Center

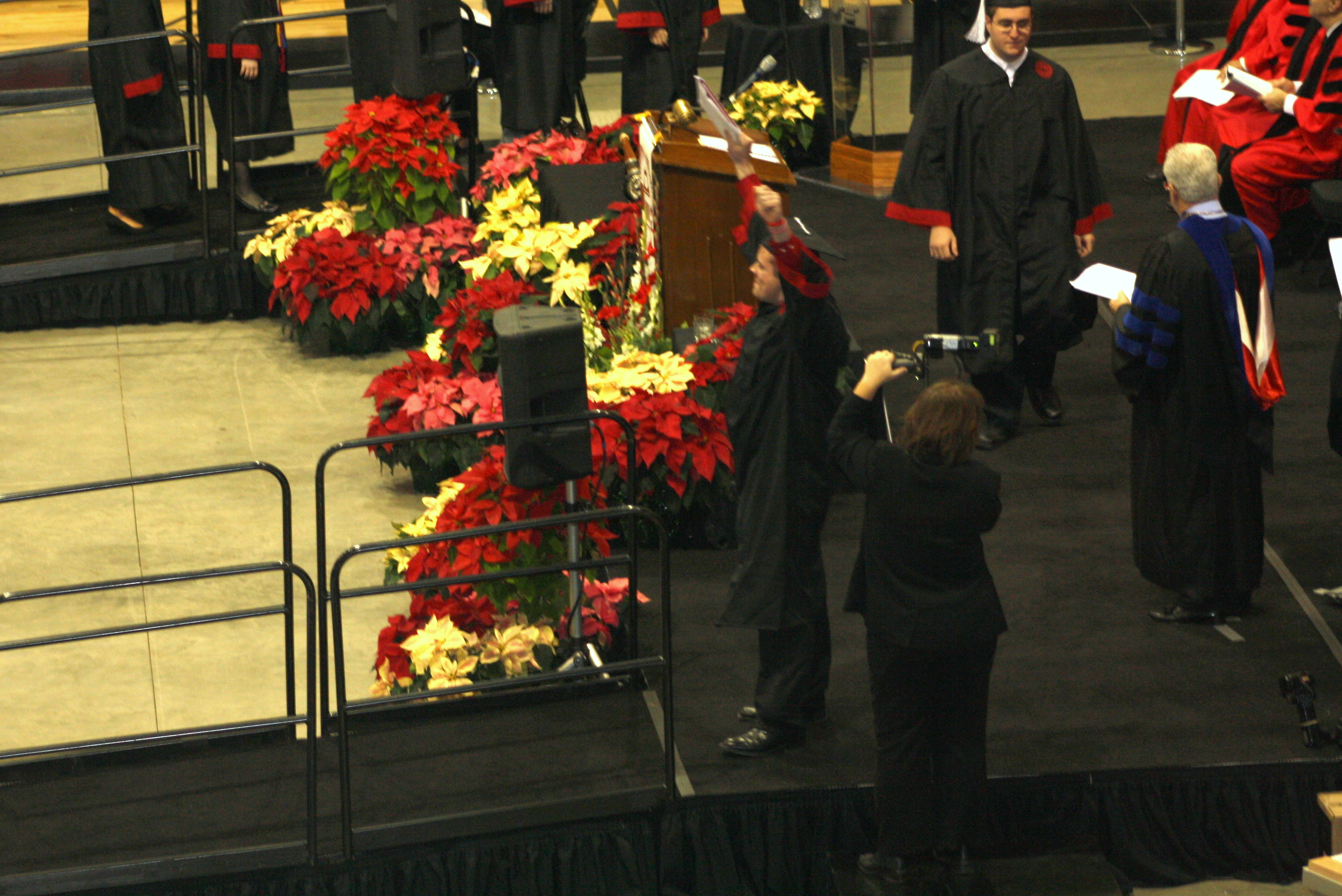
The first Undergraduate Commencement ceremony in the Convocation Center was held on December 17, 2011

A ceremonial ground-breaking ceremony was held on August 5, 2009. The convocation center was constructed across from Hamer Hall in the area which previously served as the Hamer Parking Lot. While the university is looking for a sponsor for naming rights, the building has been officially deemed the "California University Convocation Center." Dr. Angelo Armenti, President of Cal U, stated in the groundbreaking ceremony that the center "will be a landmark building for our campus,”and “Besides meeting the University’s needs, it will serve as a cultural resource and contribute to the economic vitality of Southwestern Pennsylvania.”

On August 3, 2010, a topping-off ceremony was held at the construction site to mark the placement of the final of the forty-six steel trusses on the building's frame.

Construction of the building took approximately two years and three months to complete. Construction has forced the closure of multiple streets, lots, and intersections, including the Hamer Parking Lot, Hamer Way, the intersection of Hamer and Third Street, the Third Street entrance to the river parking lot, as well as a two-year-old recreational basketball court. The Convocation Center's location had created a parking quagmire on campus, as construction of a new parking garage located behind the Manderino Library did not open until Fall of 2010, leaving a full year of school without enough parking on campus.

L. Robert Kimball & Associates served as the architects and engineers for the project, while General Contracting was under the direction of The Whiting-Turner Contracting Company of Hershey, Pennsylvania. Wayne Crouse, Inc. served as the HVAC Contractor, while WG Tomko, Inc. also served as the Plumbing Contractor. In addition, California University contracted A-1 Electrical Service of Venetia, PA and Ryco, Inc., as Electrical and Fire Protection Contractors, respectively.

The tight space the Convocation Center lies in between Hamer Hall, Gallagher Hall, and the railroad track forced construction equipment and staging areas to be moved behind the Morgan Learning Resource Center in the current "University Loop Road" area.

The Convocation Center officially opened for basketball action on December 3, 2011, with both the men's and women's teams defeating Mansfield University. The women won the opening game 79–52, while the men defeated the Mounties 91–65 in the second game of the doubleheader.

== Controversy ==
The project's large size had been questioned before construction began, including by a university consultant who recommended building the arena with 3,500 seats. By April 2011 the university was reporting that construction costs on the center were $5.5 million over the original budget. A "grand opening" concert by Kenny Rogers in April 2012 attracted only a half-capacity audience, leading to renewed questions about the scale and cost of the project. In May 2012, university president Angelo Armenti was fired by the Pennsylvania State System of Higher Education Board of Governors; among the issues cited in reports of this action were concerns about the financing and financial impact of the convocation center.
