= 1995 NCAA Division III baseball tournament =

- Season: 1995
- Teams: 32
- Finals site: Kiwanis Field; Salem, Virginia
- Champions: La Verne (1st title)
- Runner-up: Methodist
- Winning coach: Owen Wright
- MOP: Jeff Polinsky (La Verne)

The 1995 NCAA Division III baseball tournament was played at the end of the 1995 NCAA Division III baseball season to determine the 20th national champion of college baseball at the NCAA Division III level. The tournament concluded with eight teams competing at a new location at Kiwanis Field in Salem, Virginia, for the championship. Eight regional tournaments were held to determine the participants in the World Series. Regional tournaments were contested in double-elimination format, with one region consisting of six teams, six regions consisting of four teams, and one region consisting of two teams, which was played as best-of-five, for a total of 32 teams participating in the tournament. The tournament champion was La Verne, who defeated Methodist for the championship. LaVerne was the first West Coast team to win the Division III title since Cal State Stanislaus in 1977.

== World Series ==
Kiwanis Field-Salem, VA (Host: )

== See also ==
- 1995 NCAA Division I baseball tournament
- 1995 NAIA World Series
