= Saint Leo Lions =

- University: Saint Leo University
- Nickname: Lions
- NCAA: Division II
- Conference: Sunshine State (primary)
- Athletic director: Marcal Lazenby Jr.
- Location: St. Leo, Florida
- Varsity teams: 15 (6 men's, 9 women's)
- Basketball arena: Marion Bowman Activities Center
- Baseball stadium: Thomas B. Southard Stadium
- Softball stadium: University Softball Stadium
- Soccer stadium: Saint Leo Soccer Field
- Aquatics center: Marion Bowman Aquatics Center
- Lacrosse stadium: University Turf Stadium
- Tennis venue: Saint Leo Tennis Center
- Colors: Green and gold
- Website: saintleolions.com

Team NCAA championships
- 2

Individual and relay NCAA champions
- 3

The Saint Leo Lions are the athletic teams that represent Saint Leo University, located in St. Leo, Florida, in intercollegiate sports at the Division II level of the National Collegiate Athletic Association (NCAA). The Lions have primarily competed in the Sunshine State Conference since its founding in the 1975–76 academic year.

== History ==
The Saint Leo Lions have won 30 Sunshine State Conference Championships and have had 123 NCAA Championship Appearances as of April 2023. Saint Leo has finished inside the top-80 out of 307 NCAA Division II institutions in the Learfield Directors' Cup in six straight years with two top-five finishes including second overall in 2015–16. The Lions have been the top SSC institution in three years, 2014–15, 2015–16, and 2017–18. The Learfield Directors' Cup reflects the overall depth and strength of a university's athletics program based on NCAA Championship participation and advancement.

== National champions ==
Saint Leo Lions National Championships
Team and/or Individual		Year	Sport
Team		2016	Men's Golf
Team		2026	Softball
Individual	Hugo Bernard	2016	Men's Golf
Individual	Marie Coors	2017	Women's Golf
Individual	Henrik Dahrendorff	2019	Men's Swimming

Hugo Bernard became the first-ever national champion in the history of the university, team or individual, on May 19, 2016 when he won at the Green Valley Ranch Golf Club in Denver, Colorado.
The Saint Leo Men's Golf team became the first-ever team national champions when they claimed the team title on May 21, 2016 in Denver, Colorado.

Marie Coors became the first-ever female to win a national title in school history on May 20, 2017 at the Findlay Country Club in Findlay, Ohio.

Henrik Dahrendorff became the first national champion in swimming program history on March 16, 2019 in Indianapolis, Indiana.

On June 3rd, 2026, the Saint Leo Lions Softball team won the NCAA Division 2 championship, beating McKendree University 5-2, clinching the series 2-0 in Chattanooga, Tennessee.

== Varsity teams ==
Men's sports	Women's sports
Baseball	Acrobatics & tumbling
Basketball	Basketball
Golf	Beach volleyball
Lacrosse	Golf
Soccer	Lacrosse
Tennis	Soccer
	Softball
	Tennis
	Volleyball

== Facilities ==
=== Marion Bowman Activities Center ===
The Bowman Center arena has two full basketball and volleyball courts and can seat as many as 1,500 spectators for an event in cushioned, seat-back chairs. During the summer of 2012 the floor was completely replaced, resurfaced, and repainted. A new energy efficient lighting system was installed before the 2009-10 school year. The Activities Center houses four classrooms, eight locker rooms and the athletic department offices. In addition, the fitness center was refurbished over the summer of 2012 featuring the latest in work out equipment for both weight training and aerobics. This impressive and spacious training/weight facility is located in the former bowling alley in the lower level of the Activities Center.

=== Thomas B. Southard Stadium ===
Replacing Dade City Park in the 1970s as the Home of the Lions and named after the college's fifth president, the oldest outdoor facility on the Saint Leo campus is complemented by a major-league caliber lighting system installed in 1987, automatic sprinklers, drainage system, press box, and a wireless scoreboard with LED videoboard. The stadium was fitted with OAI-produced windscreens in 2009, and is widely accepted as one of the premier baseball complexes in the Sunshine State Conference.
