= NCAA Division II Track and Field Championships =

NCAA Division II Track and Field Championships may refer to:

- NCAA Division II women's outdoor track and field championships
- NCAA Division II men's indoor track and field championships
- NCAA Division II men's outdoor track and field championships
- NCAA Division II women's indoor track and field championships
