= UC Davis Aggies softball =

UC Davis Aggies
- Founded: 1969
- University: University of California, Davis
- Head coach: Amy Klyse (1st year 2027 season)
- Conference: Mountain West
- Location: Davis, California, US
- Home stadium: La Rue Field (capacity: 500)
- Nickname: Aggies
- Colors: Yale blue and gold

NCAA Tournament champions
- 2003 (Division II)

NCAA Tournament appearances
- Div. I: 2010; Div. II: 1986, 1987, 1993, 1994, 1995, 1996, 1997, 1998, 1999, 2000, 2001, 2002, 2003

Regular-season conference championships
- 1973, NCAC (Div. II):1986, 1987, 1995,1997; CCAA(Div. II):1999, 2001, 2002, 2003; Big West: 2010

For information on all UC Davis sports, see UC Davis Aggies

The UC Davis Aggies softball team represents the University of California, Davis in NCAA Division I college softball. The team participates in the Mountain West Conference (MW). The Aggies are currently led by head coach Amy Klyse. The team plays its home games at La Rue Field located on the university's campus.

== Head coaches ==
Name	Years	Won	Lost	Tied	Pct.
Deanna Sciraffa	1972,1973	7	0*		1.000
* Incomplete record for 1972
Carol Benedetti	1974,1975	11	7	0	.611
Barbara Luick Jahn	1976,1977	10	17	0	.370
Kristi Conklin	1978	12	10	0	.545
Kathy DeYoung	1979–2004	777	402	2	.659
Karen Yoder	2005–2014	217	326	1	.400
Erin Thorpe	2015–2026	119	135	0	.468
Amy Klyse	2026-Present				

== Year-by-year results ==
Season	Coach	Record		Notes
Season	Coach	Overall	Conference	Notes
1969	Judy Meyer Brame	–	–	
1970	Judy Meyer Brame	–	–	
1971	Judy Meyer Brame	–	–	
1972	Deanna Sciraffa	–	–	
1973	Deanna Sciraffa	7–0	6–0	1st
Golden State Conference
1974	Carol Benedetti	8–4	4–2	3rd
1975	Carol Benedetti	3–3	3–3	5th
1976	Barbara Luick Jahn	4–7	3–3	4th
1977	Barbara Luick Jahn	6–10	4–4	4th
1978	Kristi Conklin	12–10	8–6	4th
1979	Kathy DeYoung	8–16	6–8	4th
1980	Kathy DeYoung	9–16	5–9	5th
1981	Kathy DeYoung	7–17	5–9	6th
1982	Kathy DeYoung	9–15	7–7	4th
Northern California Athletic Conference
1983	Kathy DeYoung	2–21	2–12	7th
1984	Kathy DeYoung	19–17	7–5	3rd
1985	Kathy DeYoung	23–13	15–5	2nd
1986	Kathy DeYoung	30–12	17–3	1st, NCAA Div. II Regional
1987	Kathy DeYoung	34–14–1	17–3	1st, NCAA Div. II Regional
1988	Kathy DeYoung	33–23	12–8	3rd
1989	Kathy DeYoung	24–28	15–9	2nd
1990	Kathy DeYoung	33–15	18–10	3rd
1991	Kathy DeYoung	26–17	18–10	T2nd
1992	Kathy DeYoung	30–13	17–7	T2nd
1993	Kathy DeYoung	36–13	19–5	2nd, Div. II Regional Champion; 3rd, Div. II Women's College World Series
1994	Kathy DeYoung	33–11	16–6	2nd, NCAA Div. II Regional
1995	Kathy DeYoung	43–12	20–4	1st, NCAA Div. II Regional
1996	Kathy DeYoung	51–12	20–4	2nd, Div. II Regional Champion; 3rd, Div. II Women's College World Series
1997	Kathy DeYoung	52–7–1	22–2	1st, Div. II Regional Champion semifinals, Div. II Women's College World Series
1998	Kathy DeYoung	30–13	17–7	2nd, NCAA Div. II Regional
California Collegiate Athletic Association
1999	Kathy DeYoung	41–12	27–5	T1st, NCAA Div. II Regional
2000	Kathy DeYoung	40–17	22–10	T2nd, NCAA Div. II Regional Champion; Semifinals, Div. II Women's College World Series
2001	Kathy DeYoung	44–14	23–9	1st, NCAA Div. II Regional
2002	Kathy DeYoung	41–13	24–8	1st, NCAA Div. II Regional
2003	Kathy DeYoung	53–15	25–7	1st Div. II National Champions
2004	Kathy DeYoung	26–26	14–10	4th
Division I Independent
2005	Karen Yoder	7–47	–	
2006	Karen Yoder	15–39	–	
2007	Karen Yoder	31–27	–	
Big West Conference
2008	Karen Yoder	24–36	9–12	6th
2009	Karen Yoder	22–32	6–15	7th
2010	Karen Yoder	26–29	15–6	1st, NCAA Div. I Regional
2011	Karen Yoder	22–28	7–14	6th
2012	Karen Yoder	24–28	14–7	3rd
2013	Karen Yoder	25–27	11–13	T6th
2014	Karen Yoder	21–33	9–12	5th
2015	Erin Thorpe	18–31	6–15	T6th
2016	Erin Thorpe	15–35	4–17	8th
2017	Erin Thorpe	22–32	7–14	8th
2018	Erin Thorpe	27–24	9–12	4th
2019	Erin Thorpe	39–14	13–8	3rd
2020	Erin Thorpe	16-12	0-0	3rd
2021	Erin Thorpe	19-24	13-11	3rd
2022	Erin Thorpe	23-29	10-14	8th
2023	Erin Thorpe	29-22	15-12	4th
2024	Erin Thorpe	21-29	12-15	7th
2025	Erin Thorpe	15-36	9-18	8th
2026	Erin Thorpe	29-25	17-10	4th
Mountain West Conference
2027	Amy Klyse			
Totals	1973–present	1307–1073–3	624–425	

== Notable players ==
=== Conference awards ===
Big West Pitcher of the Year

- Alex Holmes (2010)
- Justine Vela (2012)
- Brooke Yanez (2019)

Big West Freshman Player of the Year

- Kelly Harman (2009)
- Elizabeth Santana (2010)

Big West Freshman Pitcher of the Year

- Justine Vela (2012)
- Brooke Yanez (2018)

Big West Coach of the Year

- Karen Yoder (2010)

== See also ==
- List of NCAA Division I softball programs
