= Lewis and Clark Park =

Baseball stadium in Sioux City, Iowa, United States

- Location within Iowa Location within the United States
- Interactive map of Lewis and Clark Park
- Full name: Security National Bank Field at Lewis and Clark Park
- Former names: Lewis and Clark Park {1993–2016); MercyOne Field at Lewis and Clark Park (2016–2026)
- Address: 3400 Line Drive; Sioux City, Iowa
- Coordinates: 42.443047°N 96.364217°W
- Owner: City of Sioux City
- Capacity: 3,800
- Field size: Left field: 300 ft (91 m); Center field: 400 ft (120 m); Right field: 300 ft (91 m)

Construction
- Opened: 1993

Tenants
- Sioux City Explorers (AA) 1993–present Morningside Mustangs baseball (NAIA – GPAC) ?–2024

Website
- mercyone-field

Lewis and Clark Park, officially known as Security National Bank Field at Lewis and Clark Park, is a stadium in Sioux City, Iowa. It is primarily used for baseball and is the home field of the Sioux City Explorers minor league baseball team and also served as the Morningside University baseball team until 2025. The ballpark opened in 1993 and has a capacity of 3,800 people.

The park is named for Meriwether Lewis and William Clark, leaders of the Lewis and Clark Expedition of the American West who journeyed across the western frontier of early America from 1804 to 1806. The expedition's only casualty, Charles Floyd, was lost near present-day Sioux City.

In May 2026, the city and Security National Bank of Sioux City reached a seven-year agreement for naming rights to the ballpark's playing surface. Under a previous contract with MercyOne, it had been known since 2016 as MercyOne Field at Lewis and Clark Park.

Some of the amenities at the park include a concession stand, handicap accessible elevators, a team shop stocked with Explorers merchandise, a press box, and 4 VIP air conditioned suites.

Events and tenants
Preceded by Midway Stadium	Host of the NoL All-Star Game; Lewis and Clark Park; 1998	Succeeded by Newman Outdoor Field
