= James I. Moyer Sports Complex =

Sports facility in Salem, Virginia

- Interactive map of James I. Moyer Sports Complex
- Address: 1000 Union Street, Salem, VA 24153
- Location: Salem, Virginia
- Coordinates: 37.2780407°N 80.055814°W
- Owner: City of Salem, Virginia
- Operator: City of Salem, Virginia

Construction
- Opened: April 1992

Tenants
- Roanoke College; Salem High School

James I. Moyer Sports Complex is a sports facility located in Salem, Virginia. The complex consists of four softball fields and is home to the Roanoke College and Salem High School softball teams.

The complex is named for James Irvine Moyer, who served as the mayor of Salem from 1948 to 1964.

The complex has hosted both the NCAA Division II and Division III softball tournaments.
