= Merrimack Warriors softball =

College softball team

Merrimack Warriors
- University: Merrimack College
- Head coach: Jill Gagnon (1st season)
- Conference: MAAC
- Location: North Andover, Massachusetts, US
- Home stadium: Martone-Mejail Field
- Nickname: Warriors
- Colors: Blue and gold

NCAA Tournament champions
- 1994*

NCAA WCWS appearances
- 1994* 1995* 1998* 1999* 2000*

NCAA Tournament appearances
- 1991*, 1993*, 1994*, 1995*, 1996*, 1997*, 1998*, 1999*, 2000*, 2001*, 2002*, 2004*, 2011*, 2017*, 2018*

Conference tournament championships
- 1991*, 1992*, 1993*, 1994*, 1995*, 1999*, 2001*, 2002*

Regular-season conference championships
- 1988*, 1991*, 1992*, 1993*, 1994*, 1995*, 1998*, 1999*, 2000*, 2001*, 2002*, 2017* *at Division II level

The Merrimack Warriors softball team represents Merrimack College in NCAA Division I college softball. The team participates in the Metro Atlantic Athletic Conference (MAAC), having joined following the 2023–2024 academic school year. From 1985 until 2019, the team was a member of the Northeast-10 Conference (NE–10), playing at the Division II level before transitioning to Division I in 2020. From 2020 until 2024, the team was a member of the Northeast Conference (NEC). In 2024 they joined the Metro athletic conference (MAAC). The Warriors are currently led by head coach Jill Gagnon. The team plays its home games at Martone-Mejail Field located on the college's campus.

== History ==
During their time as an NCAA Division II program, Merrimack found significant success as a member of the Northeast-10 Conference, They had 19 straight winning seasons from 1986-2004. Including winning the 1994 NCAA Division II softball championship over Humboldt State going 45-4 overall that year, In addition to a national title, the Warriors won 12 regular season championships, eight conference tournament championships, 5 regional championships from 1994-2000. Qualifying for the NCAA tournament 15 times. Since transitioning to Division I in 2020, The team has yet to finish a season with a winning record. However they were runners up in the NEC championship during the 2023 season. In 2025 they moved to the MAAC.

Merrimack won several awards during their time in the Northeast-10 Conference. The program won eight NE-10 Player of the Year awards, doing so in 1988 with Jenny Jenkins, 1993 and 1994 with Kim Page, 1996 with Daniela Paparo, 1996 with Raffaela Paparo, 1998 and 1999 with Stacey Dell'Anno, and 2002 with Katie Morgis. The team has also won six NE-10 Coach of the Year awards, winning in 1986, 1988, and 1992 with Bob DeGregorio, 1993 with Michelle Myslinski, and in 2009 and 2017 with Elaine Schwager. The 1994 team was inducted into the Northeast-10 conference hall of fame as well as the Merrimack athletics hall of fame.

=== Coaching history ===
Years	Coach	Record	%
1985–1992	Bob DeGregorio	209–122–2	.631
1993–2004	Michelle Myslinski	434–127	.774
2005	Stacey Sullivan	23–35	.397
2006–2011, 2015–present	Elaine Schwager	308–378	.449
2012	Jill Karwoski	19–23	.452
2013–2014	Jim Cardello	42–44–1	.489

== Roster ==
2024 Merrimack Warriors roster
Pitchers: 21 – Madie Fornwalt – Graduate Student; 31 – Anna Gedacht – Freshman; 12 – Cecelia Imbimbo – Freshman; 16 – Brandi Neil – Sophomore; 44 – Sofia Palyan – Junior; 00 – Sydney Samuel – Sophomore; Catchers: 22 – Madi Gibeault – Freshman; 28 – Gabby Kaduson – Freshman; 20 – Caity Lemay – Sophomore; 7 – Madison Metcalf – Sophomore; 17 – Jordan Theriault – Freshman	Infielders: 23 – Madeline Arvai – Freshman; 15 – Thiana Brito – Sophomore; 24 – Ellen Hubbard – Junior; 27 – Bailey McDermott – Sophomore; 2 – Alex Miller – Sophomore; 9 – Sam Russalesi – Sophomore; 18 – Sydney Shinopulos – Junior; Outfielders: 42 – Madison Cerpa – Senior; 3 – Abby Choquette – Freshman; 26 – Hannah Scarano – Senior; Utility: 13 – Courtney Lanpher – Graduate Student

== Individual awards ==
=== Player awards ===
NE10 player of the year

- Jenny Jenkins (1988)
- Kim Page x2 (1993, 1994)
- Daniela Paparo (1995)
- Raffaela Paparo (1996)
- Katie Morgis (2002)

NE10 Rookie of the year

- Jenny Jenkins (1986)
- Sue Foulds (1989)
- Kim Page (1991)
- Judy O’Connell (1992)
- Raffaela Paparo (1993)
- Katie Morgis (1999)
- Meghan Condon (2001)

NE10 Pitcher of the year

- Kelli Jo Deardorff (2011)
- Megan Cook (2018)

=== Coaches awards ===
NE10 Coach of the year

- Bob Degregorio x3 (1986, 1988, 1992)
- Michele Mylinski (1993)
- Elaine Schwager x2 (2009, 2017)

=== All Americans ===
- Daniela Paparo (1995)
- Keri Bianchini (1995)
- Michelle Lefebvre (1995)
- Raffaella Paparo (1995)
- Stacey Dell'Anno (1988, 1999)
- Sheryl Marshall (1999)
- Jennifer Connolly (1999, 2000)
- Heather Faria (2000)
- Katie Morgis (2001, 2002)
- Jill Gagnon (2009)
- Kelsey Ellis (2009)
- Tawny Palmieri (2013)
- Megan Cook (2018)

=== Merrimack Athletics hall of fame ===
- Kim Ducharme (2003)
- Stephen McAuliffe (2017)
- Judy O'Connell (2018)
- Stacey (Dell'Anno) Laganas (2018)

== Season-by-season results ==
Record table
Season	Coach	Overall	Conference	Standing	Postseason
Merrimack Warriors (Northeast-10 Conference) (1985–2019)
1985	Bob DeGregorio	7–16	4–10	T–6th	
1986	Bob DeGregorio	20–11	9–5	2nd	
1987	Bob DeGregorio	18–14	7–7	5th	
1988	Bob DeGregorio	37–10	12–4	T–1st	
1989	Bob DeGregorio	30–20	11–5	T–3rd	
1990	Bob DeGregorio	27–22–1	16–2	2nd	
1991	Bob DeGregorio	34–18–1	15–3	T–1st	NCAA Tournament
1992	Bob DeGregorio	34–12	17–1	1st	
1993	Michelle Myslinski	41–6	18–0	1st	NCAA Tournament
1994	Michelle Myslinski	45–4	16–2	T–1st	NCAA Champions
1995	Michelle Myslinski	40–11	16–2	T–1st	NCAA Tournament
1996	Michelle Myslinski	33–9	11–3	2nd	NCAA Tournament
1997	Michelle Myslinski	23–14	12–4	2nd	NCAA Tournament
1998	Michelle Myslinski	40–6	19–1	1st	NCAA Tournament
1999	Michelle Myslinski	42–6	17–1	1st	NCAA Tournament
2000	Michelle Myslinski	39–13	16–2	1st	NCAA Tournament
2001	Michelle Myslinski	40–8	25–3	1st	NCAA Tournament
2002	Michelle Myslinski	35–16	23–5	1st	NCAA Tournament
2003	Michelle Myslinski	23–16	17–9	4th	
2004	Michelle Myslinski	35–18	20–8	T–3rd	NCAA Tournament
2005	Stacey Sullivan	20–22	16–12	5th	
2006	Elaine Schwager	17–27	13–13	9th	
2007	Elaine Schwager	23–20	17–11	6th	
2008	Elaine Schwager	9–27	9–19	13th	
2009	Elaine Schwager	26–19	18–10	4th	
2010	Elaine Schwager	17–26	13–17	10th	
2011	Elaine Schwager	31–23	20–10	T–2nd	NCAA Tournament
2012	Jill Karwoski	19–23	13–17	T–10th	
2013	Jim Cardello	21–22–1	13–11–1	5th (Northeast)	
2014	Jim Cardello	21–20	13–7	3rd (Northeast)	
2015	Elaine Schwager	19–24	12–13	5th (Northeast)	
2016	Elaine Schwager	24–26	14–13	4th (Northeast)	
2017	Elaine Schwager	35–15	19–5	1st (Northeast)	NCAA Tournament
2018	Elaine Schwager	33–16	17–10	3rd (Northeast)	NCAA Tournament
2019	Elaine Schwager	25–23	15–12	3rd (Northeast)	
Merrimack Warriors (Northeast Conference) (2020–2024)
2020	Elaine Schwager	2–12	0–0	N/A	Season cut short due to COVID-19 pandemic
2021	Elaine Schwager	4–12	4–12	8th	
2022	Elaine Schwager	14–28	10–14	7th	
2023	Elaine Schwager	18–30	11–10	4th	
2024	Elaine Schwager	19–34	12–12	5th	
Merrimack Warriors (Metro Atlantic Athletic Conference) (2025–present)
2025	Elaine Schwager	12–31	9–14	9th	
2026	Jill Gagnon	12–29	10–16	10th	
Total:		1,059–789–3 (.573)			
National champion Postseason invitational champion Conference regular season champion Conference regular season and conference tournament champion Division regular season champion Division regular season and conference tournament champion Conference tournament champion

== See also ==
- List of NCAA Division I softball programs
