= California Vulcans =

- University: Pennsylvania Western University, California
- Conference: PSAC
- NCAA: Division II
- Athletic director: Dr. Karen Hjerpe
- Location: California, Pennsylvania
- Varsity teams: 16 (7 men's, 9 women's)
- Football stadium: Adamson Stadium
- Basketball arena: Convocation Center
- Ice hockey arena: Rostraver Ice Garden
- Baseball stadium: Wild Things Park
- Mascot: Blaze the Vulcan
- Nickname: Vulcans
- Fight song: Chariots of Fire
- Colors: Red and black
- Website: calvulcans.com
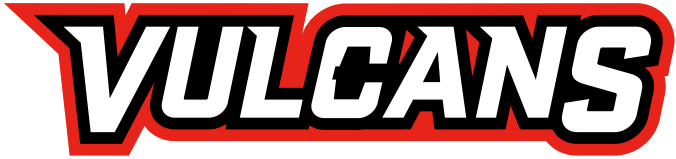

Team NCAA championships
- 4

The California Vulcans are the intercollegiate sports teams and players that represent Pennsylvania Western University California (PennWest California; known before July 2022 as California University of Pennsylvania), located in California, Pennsylvania. The Vulcans participate in the NCAA Division II in all sports and the Pennsylvania State Athletic Conference (PSAC) in most sports. The school colors are Red and Black. The mascot of California is Blaze the Vulcan.

The Vulcans football team won the Division II PSAC West Championship in 2005, 2006, 2007 and 2008. In 2008 California won the recently resurrected PSAC Championship game, claiming the conference title. California won back-to-back Northeast Regional Championships in 2007 and 2008. In 2007, under Head Coach John Luckhardt, California achieved a 13–1 record, including a 6–0 record in-conference.

California's Women's Volleyball Team has also encountered recent success, going 34–4 overall and 10–0 in-conference play in 2007 before falling in the Elite Eight round of the NCAA Division II Volleyball Championship Tournament.

The school's Men's & Women's basketball teams have been a high point as well, with both teams advancing to the PSAC Final Four on March 6, 2008.

In 2009, both Cal U's Women's Volleyball and Women's Soccer teams advanced to the NCAA-DII Elite Eight round of the playoffs before being eliminated from contention. California's football team stumbled early in the season, dropping three games early in the season before marching into the PSAC Championship game vs. Eastern Division representative Shippensburg University. Shippensburg defeated the Vulcans for the title of PSAC Champions. Despite the loss, the Vulcans earned a playoff berth. The Vulcans defeated Fayetteville State University, returned to avenge the PSAC Championship loss against Shippensburg, and defeated the first ranked offense of West Liberty University. However, the Vulcans' improbable run ended for the third straight season in the semi-final round, as the Vulcans were shut down by Northwest Missouri State University, 56–24.

Many of California's athletic events are covered by the university's television and radio stations, CUTV and WCAL 91.9 FM. In some instances, CUTV has provided video for CBS College Sports Network and PCN. Vulcan football games used to be broadcast by Fox Sports Net Pittsburgh. CUTV now covers all Vulcan Football and Basketball games home and away. The National Semifinal rounds were broadcast worldwide in 2007 on ESPNU and ESPN Classic on December 6, 2008. Cal U appeared again on national television in 2009 for the National Semifinal round of the football playoffs on CBS College Sports Network.

== Varsity athletic teams ==
Men's s	Women's s
Baseball	Basketball
Basketball	Cross country
Cross country	Golf
Football	Soccer
Golf	Softball
Soccer	Swimming
Track and field	Tennis
	Track and field
	Volleyball

=== Baseball ===
California has had 8 Major League Baseball draft selections since the draft began in 1965.

Vulcans in the Major League Baseball Draft

Year	Player	Round	Team
1965	Gilbert Barnett	17	Phillies
1968	Keith Haney	10	Giants
1985	Brian Schaum	30	Pirates
1987	Randal Wadsworth	24	Dodgers
1991	Rick Krivda	23	Orioles
1994	Richard Venezia	32	Pirates
1995	Steve Flanigan	21	Pirates
2013	Kyle Petty	23	Mariners
2016	Mick Fennell	22	Cardinals

=== Football ===
==== The Kevin Donley Era ====
Kevin Donley has been one of the most successful coaches in NAIA football. However, his record while leading the NCAA Division II Vulcans did not attain the success he has shown elsewhere. In 4 seasons at California University of Pennsylvania, Donley compiled an uncharacteristic record of 11–33 (.250) overall. After the 1996 season, Donley left Cal U to set up the football program and become the first head coach at the University of Saint Francis (IN).

Following is a game-by-game recap of the Kevin Donley era:

===== 1993 =====
(4–7 overall, 2–4 conference)

Date	Opponent	Site	Result
September 4	at West Liberty*	West Liberty, WV	W 43–32
September 11	West Virginia Wesleyan*	California, PA	L 23–31
September 18	Fairmont State*	California, PA	W 31–16
September 25	at Kutztown*	Kutztown, PA	L 28–31
October 2	East Stroudsburg*	California, PA	L 6–9
October 9	at Slippery Rock	Slippery Rock, PA	L 30–40
October 16	Indiana (PA)	California, PA	L 13–52
October 23	at Edinboro	Edinboro, PA	L 7–32
October 30	Clarion	California, PA	W 26–14
November 6	at Lock Haven	Lock Haven, PA	W 56–14
November 13	Shippensburg	California, PA	L 6–7
*Non-conference game

===== 1994 =====
(2–9 overall, 1–5 conference)

Date	Opponent	Site	Result
September 3	at Fairmont State*	Fairmont, WV	W 53–37
September 10	Glenville State*	California, PA	L 28–53
September 17	at Bloomsburg*	Bloomsburg, PA	L 22–23
September 24	Kutztown*	California, PA	L 21–46
October 1	Slippery Rock	California, PA	L 33–37
October 8	at Indiana (PA)	Indiana, PA	L 33–62
October 15	Edinboro	California, PA	L 6–67
October 22	at Clarion	Clarion, PA	W 41–31
October 29	Lock Haven	California, PA	L 44–53
November 5	at Shippensburg	Shippensburg, PA	L 47–63
November 12	West Chester*	California, PA	L 14–60
*Non-conference game

===== 1995 =====
(2–9 overall, 1–5 conference)

Date	Opponent	Site	Result
August 31	Fairmont State*	California, PA	W 28–26
September 9	at Glenville State*	Glenville, WV	L 29–31
September 16	Bloomsburg*	California, PA	L 20–24
September 23	at Kutztown*	Kutztown, PA	L 0–34
September 30	at Slippery Rock	Slippery Rock, PA	L 14–42
October 7	Indiana (PA)	California, PA	L 20–44
October 14	at Edinboro	Edinboro, PA	L 7–31
October 21	Clarion	California, PA	L 10–20
October 28	at Lock Haven	Lock Haven, PA	W 19–14
November 4	Shippensburg	California, PA	L 15–26
November 11	at West Chester*	West Chester, PA	L 24–25
*Non-conference game

===== 1996 =====
(3–8 overall, 0–6 conference)

Date	Opponent	Site	Result
September 5	Tusculum*	California, PA	W 31–14
September 14	at Fairmont State*	Fairmont, WV	W 28–26
September 21	West Virginia Wesleyan*	California, PA	W 10–24 (vacated)
September 28	at Saint Joseph’s*	Rensselaer, IN	L 7–37
October 5	at Indiana (PA)	Indiana, PA	L 6–42
October 12	Edinboro	California, PA	L 13–14
October 19	at Clarion	Clarion, PA	L 14–45
October 26	Lock Haven	California, PA	L 14–21
November 2	at Shippensburg	Shippensburg, PA	L 7–16
November 9	Kutztown*	California, PA	L 14–21
November 16	Slippery Rock	California, PA	L 28–55
*Non-conference game

== Club sports ==
- Cheerleading
- Fencing
- Equestrian Team
- Men's and Women's Ice Hockey
- Inline Hockey
- Dance Team
- Men's and Women's Rugby
- Men's and Women's Lacrosse

== Facilities ==
=== Adamson Stadium ===
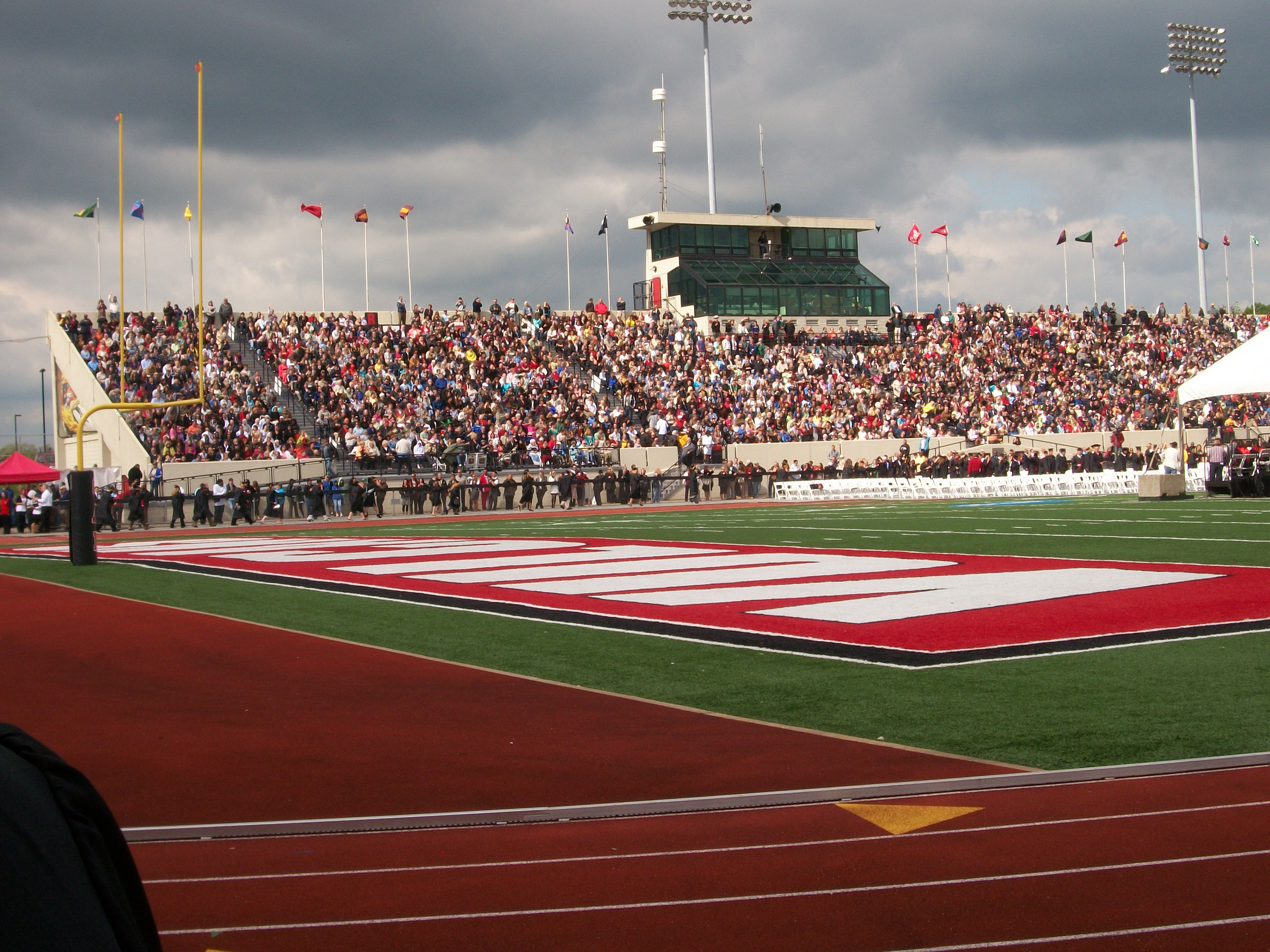
Adamson Stadium, football venue

Adamson Stadium is the university's home for the football and track & field teams. The stadium, which was renovated in the 1990s and has an eight-lane, all-weather track & field facilities that was renovated in 2002 (including runways), a two-level press box that can accommodate radio and television broadcasts, two large varsity locker rooms, two sets of public restrooms, concession stand, scoreboard with message board capabilities, ticket booths, training room and an equipment room. Just outside Adamson Stadium is the area for track & field throwing events (javelin, discus, shot put and hammer).

=== Wild Things Park ===
Wild Things Park, where Cal U plays its home baseball games, is a professional baseball stadium in nearby Washington, Pa. Wild Things Park boasts seating for 3,500, team dugouts, locker rooms, full press box, bullpens, concession stands, restrooms, abundant parking and a family play area with arcade games and rides. The baseball team also has a field at Roadman Park that is used for practice but has seating for 500 and can be used for games when needed.

=== Convocation Center ===
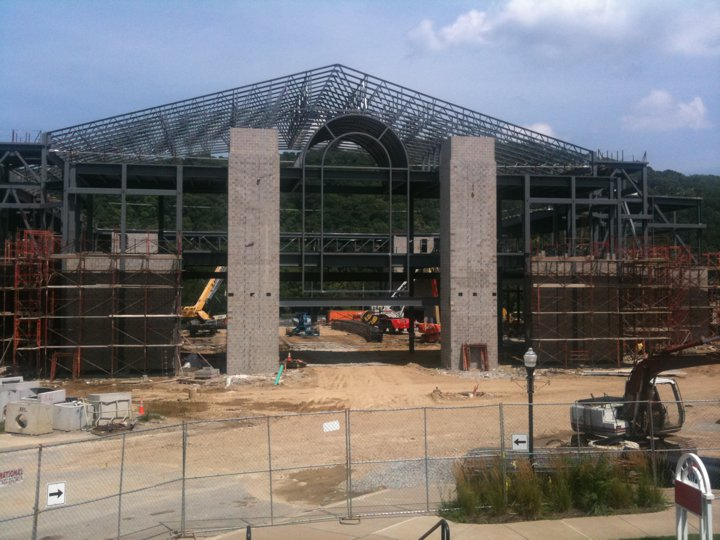
The Convocation Center under construction in 2010

The Convocation Center is a multi-purpose arena in California, Pennsylvania. The arena is the home of the California Vulcans men and women's basketball and volleyball teams, as well as the host of graduation commencement. The Convocation Center is able to host other sporting events, concerts, and trade shows, featuring a removable hardwood surface. The building, covering over 142,000 sq. feet, is the largest indoor venue between Morgantown, West Virginia and Pittsburgh, Pennsylvania.

The Cal U Convocation Center is also home to the "Rivers Bend Conference Center," which features executive-level conferencing facilities. Also included in the venue are "smart" classrooms, configurable for large or small-group presentations, high-tech audio and visual systems, wireless Internet access, webcams, videoconferencing equipment, and interactive response systems. Upon installation, the arena will be the first in the area to house a Wavecam unit, suspended above the arena floor for aerial views during television productions. The building replaces the Vulcans previous basketball and volleyball arena, Hamer Hall, which opened its doors in 1965.

=== Roadman Park ===
Roadman Park is an all-purpose complex that includes 15 fields that can be used for soccer, lacrosse football, band practice, etc., as well as seven tennis courts for varsity, intramural and recreational use. The university is in the process of upgrading the varsity soccer field to include bleacher seating, scoring area/press box and permanent scoreboard among other amenities. The university, along with the Professional Golfer's Association (PGA), is also in the development stages of building a golf practice facility at Roadman Park in conjunction with the addition of a golf management curriculum and varsity teams for both men and women.

=== Lilly Field ===
Lilly Field is the home to Cal U's softball team, which won back-to-back NCAA Division II Championships in 1997 and 1998. Lilly Field features a fully enclosed field, skinned infield, permanent and temporary seating for 300, team dugouts, warm-up bullpen areas and a concession stand. In case of inclement weather, California has a tarp to cover entire infield, allowing the team to restart play as quickly as possible.

== National championships ==
Sport	Titles	Winning years
Softball	2	1997, 1998
Women's Basketball	2	2004, 2015
Men's Ice Hockey	1	2008 (ACHA)
