= 1995 NCAA Division I baseball season =

Baseball season

- Number of teams: 276

NCAA tournament

College World Series
- Champions: Cal State Fullerton (3rd title)
- Runners-up: Southern California (18th CWS Appearance)
- Winning coach: Augie Garrido (3rd title)
- MOP: Mark Kotsay (Cal State Fullerton)

Seasons
- ← 1994 1996 →

The 1995 NCAA Division I baseball season, play of college baseball in the United States organized by the National Collegiate Athletic Association (NCAA) began in the spring of 1995. The season progressed through the regular season and concluded with the 1995 College World Series. The College World Series, held for the forty ninth time in 1995, consisted of one team from each of eight regional competitions and was held in Omaha, Nebraska, at Johnny Rosenblatt Stadium as a double-elimination tournament. Cal State Fullerton claimed the championship for the second time.

== Realignment ==
- 6 schools (Cleveland State, UIC, Northern Illinois, Green Bay, Milwaukee, and Wright State departed the Mid-Continent Conference for the Midwestern Collegiate Conference.
- Colgate departed the Patriot League to become an Independent.

=== Format changes ===
- With the addition of six schools, the Midwestern Collegiate Conference divided into East and West Divisions.
- The Trans America Athletic Conference dissolved its divisions.
- The Patriot League also dissolved its divisions and did not host a Tournament for the 1995 season.

== Conference winners ==
This is a partial list of conference champions from the 1995 season. The NCAA sponsored regional competitions to determine the College World Series participants. Each of the eight regionals consisted of six teams competing in double-elimination tournaments, with the winners advancing to Omaha. In order to provide all conference champions with an automatic bid, 12 conference champions participated in a play-in round. The six winners joined the other 18 conference champions with automatic bids, 24 teams earned at-large selections.

Conference	Regular season winner	Conference Tournament	Tournament Venue • City	Tournament Winner
Atlantic 10 Conference	UMass	1995 Atlantic 10 Conference baseball tournament	Bear Stadium • Boyertown, PA	UMass
Atlantic Coast Conference	Clemson	1995 Atlantic Coast Conference baseball tournament	Greenville Municipal Stadium • Greenville, SC	Florida State
Big East Conference	Providence	1995 Big East Conference baseball tournament	Muzzy Field • Bristol, CT	Pittsburgh Panthers baseball
Big Eight Conference	Oklahoma	1995 Big Eight Conference baseball tournament	All Sports Stadium • Oklahoma City, OK	Oklahoma State
Big Ten Conference	Ohio State	1995 Big Ten Conference baseball tournament	Trautman Field • Columbus, OH	Ohio State
Big West Conference	Cal State Fullerton	1995 Big West Conference baseball tournament	Blair Field • Long Beach, CA	Cal State Fullerton
Colonial Athletic Association	James Madison	1995 Colonial Athletic Association baseball tournament	Grainger Stadium • Kinston, NC	Old Dominion
Ivy League	Gehrig - Penn; Rolfe - Yale	1995 Ivy League Baseball Championship Series	Yale Field • New Haven, CT	Penn
Metro Conference		1995 Metro Conference baseball tournament	Tom and Lib Phillips Field • Charlotte, NC	South Florida
Metro Atlantic Athletic Conference	Northern - Le Moyne; Southern - Fairfield	1995 Metro Atlantic Athletic Conference baseball tournament	Heritage Park • Colonie, NY	Siena
Mid-American Conference	Bowling Green	1995 Mid-American Conference baseball tournament	Warren E. Steller Field • Bowling Green, OH	Central Michigan
Midwestern Collegiate Conference	East - Detroit; West - Notre Dame	1995 Midwestern Collegiate Conference baseball tournament	Frank Eck Stadium • South Bend, IN	Wright State
Mid-Continent Conference	Youngstown State	1995 Mid-Continent Conference baseball tournament	Monier Field • Charleston, IL	Troy
North Atlantic Conference	Delaware	1995 North Atlantic Conference baseball tournament	Frawley Stadium • Wilmington, DE	Delaware
Northeast Conference	Rider	1995 Northeast Conference baseball tournament	Ewing Township, NJ	Rider
Pacific-10 Conference	North - Washington State; South - Southern California	no tournament		
Patriot League	Navy	no tournament		
Southeastern Conference	Eastern - Tennessee	1995 Southeastern Conference baseball tournament (Note: The SEC held separate tournaments for its Eastern and Western Divisions in 1995. Tennessee was awarded the automatic bid to the NCAA tournament.)	Lindsey Nelson Stadium • Knoxville, TN	Tennessee
Southeastern Conference	Western - Auburn	1995 Southeastern Conference baseball tournament	Dudy Noble Field • Starkville, MS	Alabama
Southern Conference	The Citadel	1995 Southern Conference baseball tournament	College Park • Charleston, SC	The Citadel
Southland Conference	Northwestern State	1996 Southland Conference baseball tournament	Fair Grounds Field • Shreveport, LA	Northeast Louisiana
Southwest Conference	Texas Tech	1995 Southwest Conference baseball tournament	Olsen Field • College Station, TX	Texas Tech
Trans America Athletic Conference	FIU	1995 Trans America Athletic Conference baseball tournament	Homestead Sports Complex • Homestead, FL	UCF
West Coast Conference	Pepperdine	No tournament		

== Conference standings ==
The following is an incomplete list of conference standings:

1995 Atlantic Coast Conference baseball standings
	Conf.				Overall
Team	W		L	PCT	W		L	PCT
No. 7 Clemson ‍†‍‍^{y}	20	–	4	.833	54	–	14	.794
No. 5 Florida State ‍‍‡‍^{y}	16	–	7	.696	53	–	16	.768
Georgia Tech ‍‍‍^{y}	16	–	8	.667	38	–	22	.633
No. 25 North Carolina ‍‍‍^{y}	14	–	10	.583	39	–	23	.629
Wake Forest ‍‍‍	13	–	11	.542	34	–	24	.586
NC State ‍‍‍	12	–	12	.500	36	–	24	.600
Virginia ‍‍‍	8	–	15	.348	26	–	29	.473
Duke ‍‍‍	4	–	20	.167	30	–	27	.526
Maryland ‍‍‍	4	–	20	.167	20	–	37	.351
† – Conference champion ‡ – Tournament champion y – Invited to the NCAA tournament As of June 30, 1995; Rankings from Collegiate Baseball

1995 Big East Conference baseball standings
	Conf.						Overall
Team	W		L		T	PCT	W		L		T	PCT
Providence ‍†‍‍	16	–	5	–	0	.762	44	–	15	–	0	.746
Seton Hall ‍‍‍	14	–	7	–	0	.667	38	–	16	–	0	.704
Villanova ‍‍‍	14	–	7	–	0	.667	40	–	16	–	0	.714
Pittsburgh ‍‍‡‍^{y}	12	–	9	–	0	.571	39	–	16	–	0	.709
St. John's ‍‍‍	12	–	9	–	0	.571	18	–	16	–	0	.529
Boston College ‍‍‍	8	–	13	–	0	.381	21	–	24	–	0	.467
Georgetown ‍‍‍	4	–	17	–	0	.190	17	–	34	–	0	.333
Connecticut ‍‍‍	4	–	17	–	0	.190	13	–	30	–	1	.307
† – Conference champion ‡ – Tournament champion y – Invited to the NCAA tournament As of June 30, 1995; Rankings from Collegiate Baseball

1995 Big Eight Conference baseball standings
	Conf.				Overall
Team	W		L	PCT	W		L	PCT
No. 8 Oklahoma ‍†‍‍^{y}	21	–	7	.750	42	–	16	.724
No. 11 Oklahoma State ‍‍‡‍^{y}	18	–	10	.643	46	–	19	.708
Iowa State ‍‍‍	13	–	12	.520	28	–	24	.538
Kansas State ‍‍‍	13	–	14	.481	29	–	24	.547
Nebraska ‍‍‍	13	–	14	.481	35	–	23	.603
Kansas ‍‍‍	9	–	17	.346	24	–	33	.421
Missouri ‍‍‍	7	–	20	.259	19	–	34	.358
† – Conference champion ‡ – Tournament champion y – Invited to the NCAA tournament As of June 30, 1995; Rankings from Collegiate Baseball

1995 Big Ten Conference baseball standings
	Conf.				Overall
Team	W		L	PCT	W		L	PCT
No. 26 Ohio State ‍†‍‡‍^{y}	18	–	10	.643	40	–	23	.635
Minnesota ‍‍‍	16	–	12	.571	31	–	27	.534
Northwestern ‍‍‍	15	–	13	.536	36	–	19	.655
Purdue ‍‍‍	15	–	13	.536	28	–	29	.491
Penn State ‍‍‍	13	–	13	.500	25	–	29	.463
Illinois ‍‍‍	14	–	14	.500	25	–	31	.446
Iowa ‍‍‍	13	–	15	.464	29	–	24	.547
Indiana ‍‍‍	12	–	16	.429	33	–	23	.589
Michigan State ‍‍‍	12	–	16	.429	24	–	27	.471
Michigan ‍‍‍	10	–	16	.385	24	–	29	.453
x – Division champion ‡ – Tournament champion y – Invited to the NCAA tournament As of June 30, 1995; Rankings from Collegiate Baseball

1995 Big West Conference baseball standings
	Conf.				Overall
Team	W		L	PCT	W		L	PCT
No. 1 Cal State Fullerton ‍†‍‡‍	18	–	3	.857	57	–	9	.864
No. 16 Long Beach State ‍‍‍	16	–	5	.762	38	–	25	.603
Nevada ‍‍‍	12	–	9	.571	35	–	18	.660
UNLV ‍‍‍	11	–	10	.524	32	–	21	.604
New Mexico State ‍‍‍	9	–	12	.429	32	–	22	.593
UC Santa Barbara ‍‍‍	8	–	13	.381	22	–	24	.478
Pacific ‍‍‍	5	–	16	.238	26	–	26	.500
San Jose State ‍‍‍	5	–	16	.238	21	–	33	.389
† – Conference champion ‡ – Tournament champion y – Invited to the 1995 NCAA Division I baseball tournament As of June 30, 1995; Rankings from Collegiate Baseball

1992 Colonial Athletic Association baseball standings
	Conf.				Overall
Team	W		L	PCT	W		L	PCT
George Mason ‍†‍‡‍^{y}	13	–	4	.765	39	–	18	.684
Richmond ‍‍‍	12	–	5	.706	32	–	17	.653
Old Dominion ‍‍‍	11	–	7	.611	39	–	19	.672
James Madison ‍‍‍	8	–	9	.471	26	–	24	.520
East Carolina ‍‍‍	7	–	10	.412	25	–	24	.510
UNC Wilmington ‍‍‍	7	–	11	.389	23	–	38	.377
William & Mary ‍‍‍	2	–	14	.125	18	–	27	.400
† – Conference champion ‡ – Tournament champion y – Invited to the NCAA tournament As of June 30, 1992; Rankings from Collegiate Baseball

1995 NCAA Division I baseball independents standings
	Conf.				Overall
Team	W		L	PCT	W		L	PCT
No. 3 Miami (FL) ‍‍‍^{y}		–		–	48	–	17	.738
Hawaii–Hilo ‍‍‍		–		–	21	–	26	.447
Oral Roberts ‍‍‍		–		–	21	–	34	.382
West Chester ‍‍‍		–		–	16	–	29	.356
Colgate ‍‍‍		–		–	6	–	16	.273
Southern Utah ‍‍‍		–		–	10	–	32	.238
y – Invited to the NCAA tournament As of June 30, 1995; Rankings from Collegiate Baseball

1995 Ivy League baseball standings
	Conf.						Overall
Team	W		L		T	PCT	W		L		T	PCT
Lou Gehrig
Penn ^{x}‍‍‡‍^{y}	13	–	5	–	0	.722	25	–	21	–	0	.543
Cornell ‍‍‍	10	–	10	–	0	.500	20	–	19	–	0	.513
Columbia ‍‍‍	9	–	9	–	0	.500	15	–	24	–	1	.388
Princeton ‍‍‍	8	–	12	–	0	.400	15	–	26	–	0	.366
Red Rolfe
Yale ^{x}‍‍‍	13	–	7	–	0	.650	23	–	20	–	0	.535
Dartmouth ‍‍‍	12	–	8	–	0	.600	19	–	17	–	0	.528
Brown ‍‍‍	7	–	13	–	0	.350	14	–	27	–	0	.341
Harvard ‍‍‍	6	–	14	–	0	.300	10	–	25	–	0	.286
x – Division champion ‡ – Championship Series champion y – Invited to the NCAA tournament As of June 30, 1995; Rankings from Collegiate Baseball

1995 Metro Atlantic Athletic Conference baseball standings
	Conf.				Overall
Team	W		L	PCT	W		L	PCT
Northern
Siena ^{x}‍‍‡‍^{y}	14	–	4	.778	31	–	17	.646
Le Moyne ‍‍‍	12	–	6	.667	19	–	21	.475
Canisius ‍‍‍	7	–	11	.389	21	–	20	.512
Niagara ‍‍‍	3	–	15	.167	14	–	26	.350
Southern
Fairfield ^{x}‍‍‍	13	–	5	.722	23	–	22	.511
Iona ‍‍‍	12	–	6	.667	21	–	27	.438
Saint Peter's ‍‍‍	10	–	8	.556	18	–	24	.429
Manhattan ‍‍‍	1	–	17	.056	5	–	42	.106
x – Division champion ‡ – Tournament champion y – Invited to the NCAA tournament As of June 30, 1995; Rankings from Collegiate Baseball

1995 Mid-American Conference baseball standings
	Conf.						Overall
Team	W		L		T	PCT	W		L		T	PCT
Bowling Green ‍†‍‍	22	–	8	–	0	.733	34	–	20	–	0	.630
Kent State ‍‍‍	19	–	10	–	0	.655	40	–	19	–	0	.678
Central Michigan ‍‍‡‍^{y}	19	–	12	–	0	.613	41	–	19	–	0	.683
Akron ‍‍‍	18	–	12	–	0	.600	26	–	22	–	0	.542
Western Michigan ‍‍‍	19	–	13	–	0	.594	31	–	22	–	1	.583
Eastern Michigan ‍‍‍	18	–	13	–	0	.581	22	–	31	–	0	.415
Ohio ‍‍‍	15	–	17	–	0	.469	31	–	25	–	0	.554
Toledo ‍‍‍	9	–	21	–	0	.300	21	–	32	–	0	.396
Miami ‍‍‍	8	–	23	–	0	.258	21	–	35	–	0	.375
Ball State ‍‍‍	7	–	25	–	0	.219	15	–	41	–	0	.268
† – Conference champion ‡ – Tournament champion y – Invited to the NCAA tournament As of June 30, 1995; Rankings from Collegiate Baseball

1995 Mid-Continent Conference baseball standings
	Conf.						Overall
Team	W		L		T	PCT	W		L		T	PCT
East
Youngstown State ^{x}‍‍‍	16	–	4	–	0	.800	37	–	17	–	0	.685
Troy State ‍‍‡‍^{y}	13	–	6	–	0	.684	27	–	23	–	1	.539
Pace ‍‍‍	10	–	10	–	0	.500	21	–	26	–	1	.448
Central Connecticut ‍‍‍	7	–	13	–	0	.350	16	–	25	–	0	.390
NYIT ‍‍‍	7	–	13	–	0	.350	23	–	22	–	1	.511
C.W. Post ‍‍‍	6	–	13	–	0	.316	18	–	29	–	0	.383
West
Eastern Illinois ^{x}‍‍‍	15	–	5	–	0	.750	28	–	19	–	0	.596
Western Illinois ‍‍‍	12	–	10	–	0	.545	21	–	21	–	1	.500
Northeastern Illinois ‍‍‍	12	–	12	–	0	.500	17	–	35	–	0	.327
Valparaiso ‍‍‍	10	–	14	–	0	.417	23	–	29	–	0	.442
Chicago State ‍‍‍	7	–	15	–	0	.318	16	–	29	–	0	.356
‡ – Tournament champion y – Invited to the NCAA tournament As of June 30, 1995; Rankings from Collegiate Baseball

1995 Midwestern Collegiate Conference baseball standings
	Conf.						Overall
Team	W		L		T	PCT	W		L		T	PCT
East
Detroit ^{x}‍‍‍	12	–	2	–	0	.857	28	–	18	–	0	.609
Wright State ‍‍‡‍	10	–	6	–	0	.625	33	–	28	–	0	.541
Xavier ‍‍‍	7	–	9	–	0	.438	28	–	30	–	0	.483
La Salle ‍‍‍	5	–	9	–	0	.357	15	–	35	–	0	.300
Cleveland State ‍‍‍	4	–	12	–	0	.250	13	–	41	–	1	.245
West
Notre Dame ^{x}‍‍‍	11	–	4	–	0	.733	40	–	21	–	0	.656
Northern Illinois ‍‍‍	9	–	7	–	0	.563	29	–	27	–	0	.518
UIC ‍‍‍	7	–	9	–	0	.438	21	–	28	–	0	.429
Milwaukee ‍‍‍	6	–	9	–	0	.400	21	–	24	–	0	.467
Butler ‍‍‍	6	–	10	–	0	.375	22	–	27	–	0	.449
x – Division champion ‡ – Tournament champion As of June 30, 1995; Rankings from Collegiate Baseball

1995 Northeast Conference baseball standings
	Conf.						Overall
Team	W		L		T	PCT	W		L		T	PCT
Rider ‍†‍‡‍	16	–	5	–	0	.762	35	–	18	–	1	.657
St. Francis ‍‍‍	13	–	8	–	0	.619	26	–	17	–	0	.605
Long Island ‍‍‍	10	–	11	–	0	.476	18	–	28	–	0	.391
Marist ‍‍‍	10	–	11	–	0	.476	14	–	26	–	1	.354
Fairleigh Dickinson ‍‍‍	9	–	12	–	0	.429	20	–	25	–	0	.444
Mount St. Mary's ‍‍‍	9	–	12	–	0	.429	13	–	25	–	0	.342
Wagner ‍‍‍	9	–	12	–	0	.429	15	–	30	–	0	.333
Monmouth ‍‍‍	8	–	13	–	0	.381	19	–	33	–	0	.365
† – Conference champion ‡ – Tournament champion y – Invited to the NCAA tournament Rankings from Collegiate Baseball

1995 Pacific-10 Conference baseball standings
	Conf.				Overall
Team	W		L	PCT	W		L	PCT
Northern
Washington State ^{x}‍‍‍	18	–	12	.600	20	–	30	.400
Washington ‍‍‍	16	–	14	.533	24	–	30	.444
Gonzaga ‍‍‍	15	–	15	.500	29	–	25	.537
Oregon State ‍‍‍	14	–	16	.467	25	–	24	.510
Portland ‍‍‍	14	–	16	.467	24	–	25	.490
Portland State ‍‍‍	13	–	17	.433	19	–	36	.345
Southern
No. 2 Southern California ^{x}‍‍‍^{y}	21	–	9	.700	49	–	21	.700
No. 6 Stanford ‍‍‍^{y}	20	–	10	.667	40	–	25	.615
No. 29 California ‍‍‍	18	–	12	.600	32	–	25	.561
Arizona State ‍‍‍	13	–	17	.433	34	–	21	.618
UCLA ‍‍‍	12	–	18	.400	29	–	28	.509
Arizona ‍‍‍	6	–	24	.200	20	–	35	.364
x – Division champion y – Invited to the NCAA tournament As of June 30, 1997; Rankings from Collegiate Baseball

1995 Patriot League baseball standings
	Conf.				Overall
Team	W		L	PCT	W		L	PCT
Navy ‍†‍‍^{y}	19	–	5	.792	33	–	20	.623
Fordham ‍‍‍	16	–	8	.667	30	–	20	.600
Army ‍‍‍	15	–	9	.625	22	–	23	.489
Lehigh ‍‍‍	11	–	13	.458	23	–	23	.500
Bucknell ‍‍‍	11	–	13	.458	19	–	27	.413
Lafayette ‍‍‍	6	–	18	.250	9	–	36	.200
Holy Cross ‍‍‍	6	–	18	.250	10	–	33	.233
† – Conference champion y – Invited to the NCAA tournament As of June 30, 1995; Rankings from Collegiate Baseball

1995 Southeastern Conference baseball standings
	Conf.				Overall
Team	W		L	PCT	W		L	PCT
Eastern
No. 4 Tennessee ^{x}‍†‍‡‍^{y}	22	–	8	.733	54	–	16	.771
Florida ‍‍‍	12	–	14	.462	32	–	24	.571
South Carolina ‍‍‍	12	–	14	.462	32	–	25	.561
Georgia ‍‍‍	9	–	17	.346	29	–	29	.500
Vanderbilt ‍‍‍	10	–	19	.345	29	–	32	.475
Kentucky ‍‍‍	8	–	19	.296	29	–	32	.475
Western
No. 9 Auburn ^{x}‍‍‍^{y}	19	–	8	.704	50	–	13	.794
No. 14 Alabama ‍‍‡‍^{y}	18	–	11	.621	42	–	23	.646
No. 18 LSU ‍‍‍^{y}	17	–	12	.586	47	–	18	.723
No. 17 Ole Miss ‍‍‍^{y}	14	–	12	.538	40	–	22	.645
Arkansas ‍‍‍^{y}	13	–	15	.464	38	–	23	.623
Mississippi State ‍‍‍	11	–	16	.407	34	–	25	.576
x – Division champion † – Conference champion ‡ – Tournament champion y – Invited to the NCAA tournament As of June 30, 1995; Rankings from Collegiate Baseball

1995 Southern Conference baseball standings
	Conf.				Overall
Team	W		L	PCT	W		L	PCT
The Citadel ‍†‍‡‍^{y}	19	–	5	.792	39	–	19	.672
Georgia Southern ‍‍‍	14	–	10	.583	35	–	24	.593
Western Carolina ‍‍‍	13	–	11	.542	32	–	24	.571
Davidson ‍‍‍	12	–	12	.500	19	–	32	.373
East Tennessee State ‍‍‍	11	–	12	.478	25	–	27	.481
Appalachian State ‍‍‍	10	–	13	.435	17	–	30	.362
VMI ‍‍‍	10	–	14	.417	19	–	28	.404
Marshall ‍‍‍	9	–	15	.375	12	–	38	.240
Furman ‍‍‍	9	–	15	.375	16	–	32	.333
† – Conference champion ‡ – SoCon Tournament champion y – Invited to the NCAA tournament As of June 30, 1995; Rankings from Collegiate Baseball

1995 Southland Conference baseball standings
	Conf.				Overall
Team	W		L	PCT	W		L	PCT
Northwestern State ‍†‍‍	19	–	5	.792	37	–	13	.740
McNeese State ‍‍‍	17	–	6	.739	39	–	14	.736
Northeast Louisiana ‍‍‡‍^{y}	16	–	7	.696	34	–	20	.630
Texas–Arlington ‍‍‍	14	–	10	.583	26	–	30	.464
Texas–San Antonio ‍‍‍	13	–	11	.542	31	–	23	.574
Southwest Texas State ‍‍‍	10	–	14	.417	23	–	31	.426
Sam Houston State ‍‍‍	10	–	14	.417	22	–	32	.407
Nicholls State ‍‍‍	8	–	16	.333	23	–	28	.451
Stephen F. Austin ‍‍‍	0	–	24	.000	2	–	40	.048
† – Conference champion ‡ – Tournament champion y – Invited to the NCAA tournament As of June 30, 1995; Rankings from Collegiate Baseball

1995 Southwest Conference baseball standings
	Conf.				Overall
Team	W		L	PCT	W		L	PCT
No. 10 Texas Tech ‍†‍‡‍^{y}	16	–	8	.667	51	–	14	.785
No. 15 Rice ‍‍‍^{y}	15	–	9	.625	43	–	19	.694
No. 12 Texas A&M ‍‍‍^{y}	15	–	9	.625	44	–	22	.667
No. 23 Texas ‍‍‍^{y}	14	–	10	.583	44	–	19	.698
Texas Christian ‍‍‍	11	–	13	.458	27	–	29	.482
Baylor ‍‍‍	7	–	17	.292	25	–	28	.472
Houston ‍‍‍	6	–	18	.250	26	–	29	.473
† – Conference champion ‡ – Tournament champion y – Invited to the NCAA tournament As of June 30, 1995; Rankings from Collegiate Baseball

1995 Trans America Athletic Conference baseball standings
	Conf.						Overall
Team	W		L		T	PCT	W		L		T	PCT
No. 20 FIU ‍†‍‍^{y}	27	–	3	–	0	.900	50	–	11	–	0	.820
No. 21 UCF ‍‍‡‍^{y}	23	–	7	–	0	.767	49	–	13	–	0	.790
Stetson ‍‍‍	19	–	11	–	0	.633	34	–	25	–	0	.576
Florida Atlantic ‍‍‍	17	–	13	–	0	.567	27	–	31	–	0	.466
Centenary ‍‍‍	14	–	13	–	0	.519	23	–	27	–	0	.460
Campbell ‍‍‍	12	–	18	–	0	.400	26	–	29	–	0	.473
Georgia State ‍‍‍	11	–	17	–	0	.393	20	–	33	–	0	.377
Southeastern Louisiana ‍‍‍	10	–	18	–	0	.357	17	–	31	–	0	.354
Mercer ‍‍‍	9	–	18	–	0	.333	15	–	36	–	2	.302
Samford ‍‍‍	10	–	20	–	0	.333	21	–	30	–	0	.412
College of Charleston ‍‍‍	8	–	22	–	0	.267	17	–	29	–	0	.370
† – Conference champion ‡ – Tournament champion y – Invited to the NCAA tournament As of June 30, 1995; Rankings from Collegiate Baseball

== College World Series ==
The 1995 season marked the forty-ninth NCAA baseball tournament, which culminated with the eight team College World Series. The College World Series was held in Omaha, Nebraska. The eight teams played a double-elimination format, with Cal State Fullerton claiming their third championship with an 11–5 win over Southern California in the final.

=== Bracket ===
First round	Second round
6	Southern California	0
3	Miami (FL)	15
3	Miami (FL)	4
2	Florida State	2
7	Oklahoma	2
2	Florida State	3
Bracket One
7	Oklahoma	4
6	Southern California	9
2	Florida State	11
6	Southern California	16
5	Tennessee	3
4	Clemson	1
5	Tennessee	1
1	Cal State Fullerton	11
8	Stanford	5
1	Cal State Fullerton	6
Bracket Two
8	Stanford	8
4	Clemson	3
5	Tennessee	6
8	Stanford	2

Semifinals
3	Miami (FL)	5	3
6	Southern California	7	7
1	Cal State Fullerton	11	—
5	Tennessee	0	—

Finals
6	Southern California	5
1	Cal State Fullerton	11
