= 1995 Trans America Athletic Conference baseball tournament =

American college baseball tournament

- Teams: 4
- Format: Double-elimination
- Finals site: Homestead Sports Complex; Homestead, Florida
- Champions: UCF (2nd title)
- Winning coach: Jay Bergman (2nd title)
- MVP: Todd Tocco (UCF)

1995 Trans America Athletic Conference baseball standings
	Conf.						Overall
Team	W		L		T	PCT	W		L		T	PCT
No. 20 FIU ‍†‍‍^{y}	27	–	3	–	0	.900	50	–	11	–	0	.820
No. 21 UCF ‍‍‡‍^{y}	23	–	7	–	0	.767	49	–	13	–	0	.790
Stetson ‍‍‍	19	–	11	–	0	.633	34	–	25	–	0	.576
Florida Atlantic ‍‍‍	17	–	13	–	0	.567	27	–	31	–	0	.466
Centenary ‍‍‍	14	–	13	–	0	.519	23	–	27	–	0	.460
Campbell ‍‍‍	12	–	18	–	0	.400	26	–	29	–	0	.473
Georgia State ‍‍‍	11	–	17	–	0	.393	20	–	33	–	0	.377
Southeastern Louisiana ‍‍‍	10	–	18	–	0	.357	17	–	31	–	0	.354
Mercer ‍‍‍	9	–	18	–	0	.333	15	–	36	–	2	.302
Samford ‍‍‍	10	–	20	–	0	.333	21	–	30	–	0	.412
College of Charleston ‍‍‍	8	–	22	–	0	.267	17	–	29	–	0	.370
† – Conference champion ‡ – Tournament champion y – Invited to the NCAA tournament As of June 30, 1995; Rankings from Collegiate Baseball

The 1995 Trans America Athletic Conference baseball tournament was held at Homestead Sports Complex in Homestead, Florida. This was the seventeenth tournament championship held by the Trans America Athletic Conference, in its seventeenth year of existence. UCF won their second tournament championship in three years, and first of three in a row, and earned the conference's automatic bid to the 1995 NCAA Division I baseball tournament.

== Format and seeding ==
The top four finishers by conference winning percentage qualified for the tournament, with the top seed playing the lowest seed in the first round.

Team	W	L	Pct.	GB	Seed
FIU	27	3	.900	—	1
UCF	23	7	.767	4	2
Stetson	19	11	.633	8	3
Florida Atlantic	17	13	.567	10	4
Centenary	14	13	.519	11.5	—
Campbell	12	18	.400	15	—
Georgia State	11	17	.393	15	—
Southeastern Louisiana	10	18	.357	16	—
Mercer	9	18	.333	16.5	—
Samford	10	20	.333	17	—
College of Charleston	8	22	.267	19	—

== Bracket ==
First round
1	FIU	0
4	Florida Atlantic	1
2	UCF	4
3	Stetson	3
Lower round 1
1	FIU	5
3	Stetson	6

Semi-finals
4	Florida Atlantic	5
2	UCF	7
Lower final
4	Florida Atlantic	0
3	Stetson	6

Finals
2	UCF
3	Stetson

== All-Tournament Team ==
The following players were named to the All-Tournament Team.

POS	Player	School
P	Javier Gomez	Stetson
P	Ken Wagner	Florida Atlantic
C	Jeff Smith	Stetson
1B	Todd Tocco	UCF
2B	Rookie Gage	UCF
3B	Andy Moser	UCF
SS	Kevin Nicholson	Stetson
OF	Clint Hendry	Stetson
OF	Tony Marrillia	UCF
OF	Alex Morales	UCF
DH	Matt Branz	Stetson

=== Most Valuable Player ===
Todd Tocco was named Tournament Most Valuable Player. Tocco was a first baseman for UCF.
