= X51 =

X51 or X-51 may refer to:

- Boeing X-51, a scramjet-waverider from the Air Force Research Laboratory
- X-51 (Deus Ex), a fictional organization in the video game Deus Ex
- X-51 (Machine Man), a fictional character in the Marvel Comics Universe
- X51 (New York City bus), express bus route in New York City
- Axim X51, PDA made by Dell
- X51 FAA LID for Homestead General Aviation Airport in Florida
