= Everglades Alligator Farm =

Zoo in Miami-Dade County, Florida, US

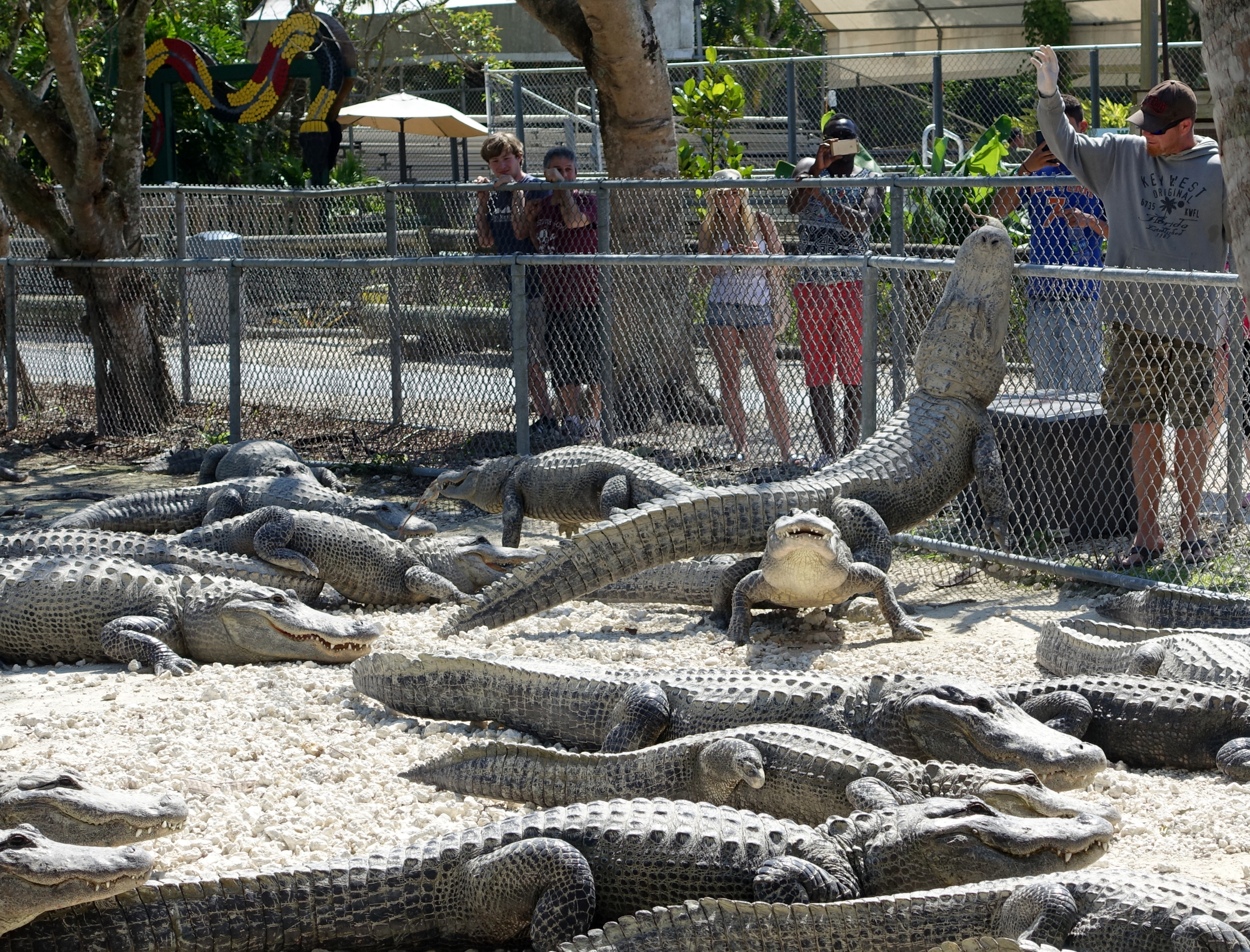
- A man feeding alligators as part of the Feeding Show
- Interactive map of Everglades Alligator Farm
- 25.393226°N 80.501207°W
- Date opened: 1982
- Location: Homestead, Florida, United States
- Director: Matthew Thibos (CEO)
- Website: everglades.com

Everglades Alligator Farm is a wildlife park in Miami-Dade County, Florida, nearby the city of Homestead and the entrance of Everglades National Park. It claims to be the oldest and largest alligator farm in South Florida, along with containing over 2,000 alligators. Additionally, it provides airboat rides through the Floridian wilderness.

The park works with the Florida Fish and Wildlife Conservation Commission to train and trap alligators hygienically and safely. Handlers are also trained on site and people who have been trained at other facilities are not hired. It is also the only alligator farm in the region that does not kill or sell alligators for meat, although it does sell their eggs to other farms in Florida.

== History ==
The park was first founded in 1982 as an attraction for airboat rides to see alligators, but in 1985 its commercial farming to conserve the species was approved.

== Animals ==
The park incorporates many American alligators in addition to snakes, tortoises, fish, parrots, emus, and a few Florida panthers. Crocodiles and caimans can also be found.

Most alligators have been bred in the park, but some others have been received from shows such as Gator Boys or been captured from the wild. If an alligator has to be relocated three times, due to training issues or the like, officers will have to euthanize it.

== Activities ==
For an additional price, people can partake in an encounter with the alligators, being able to hold different sizes and feed them.

=== Airboat rides ===
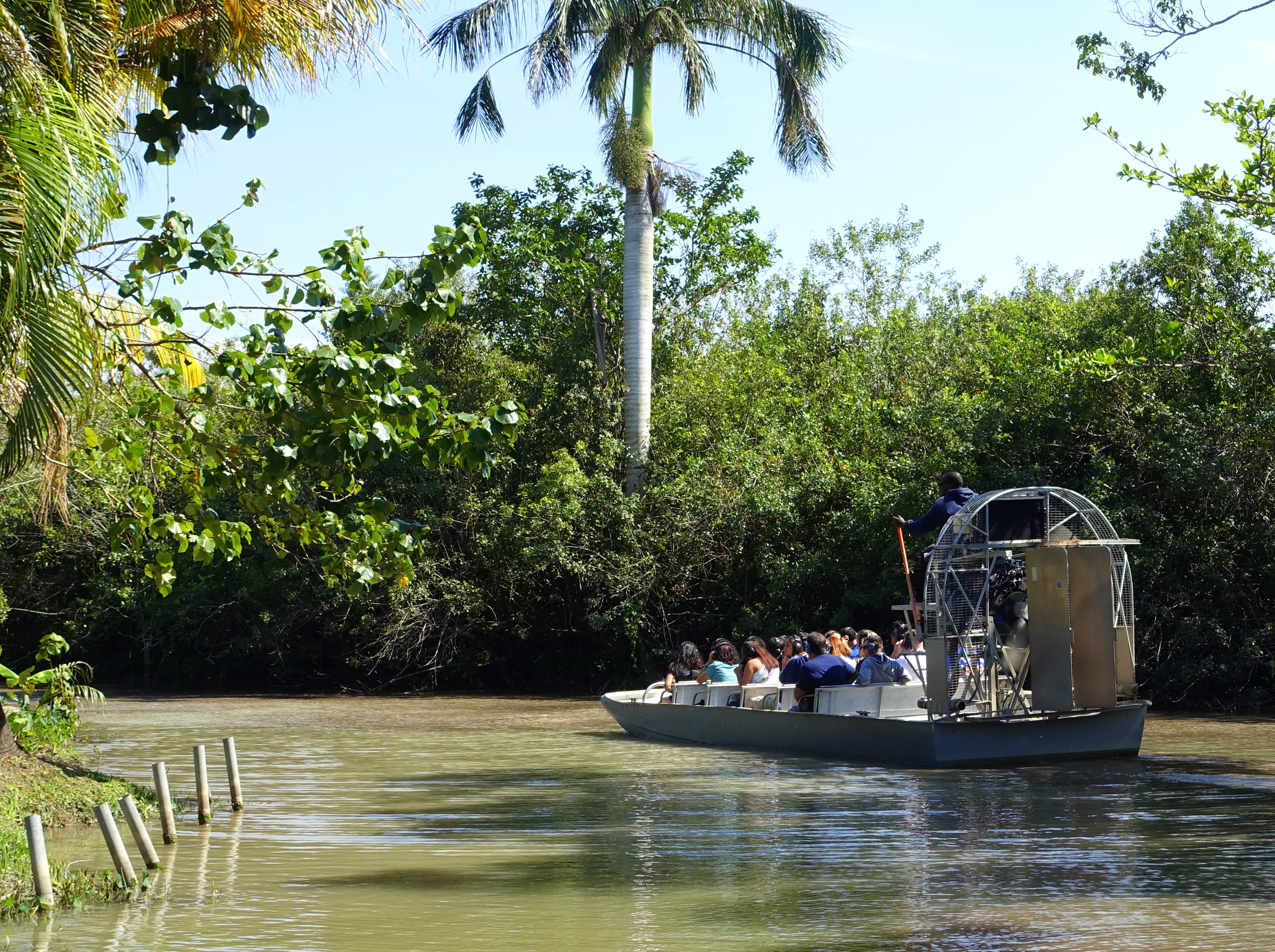
An airboat ride through the Everglades.

Airboat tours through the Everglades last roughly 20–25 minutes and hearing protection is provided, due to the loud nature of the vehicles. Alligators, fish, turtles, and birds are commonly seen during the trip. An extended 45-to-60-minute tour is available for purchase as well, in which buyers get off the boat and explore the prairies themselves.

=== Shows ===
There are two shows that each occur every two hours: the Alligator Show and Alligator Feeding. The Alligator Show is the most popular of the two, an educational performance in which experts wrestle the reptiles using Native American tactics while also teaching the audience about them along with crocodiles and caimans. In order to prevent the alligators from being stressed, they are swapped daily. The Alligator Feeding takes place in the center of the park, near a breeding pond with over 500 alligators. People watch gators crawl over and bite each other to get food.

== Gallery ==
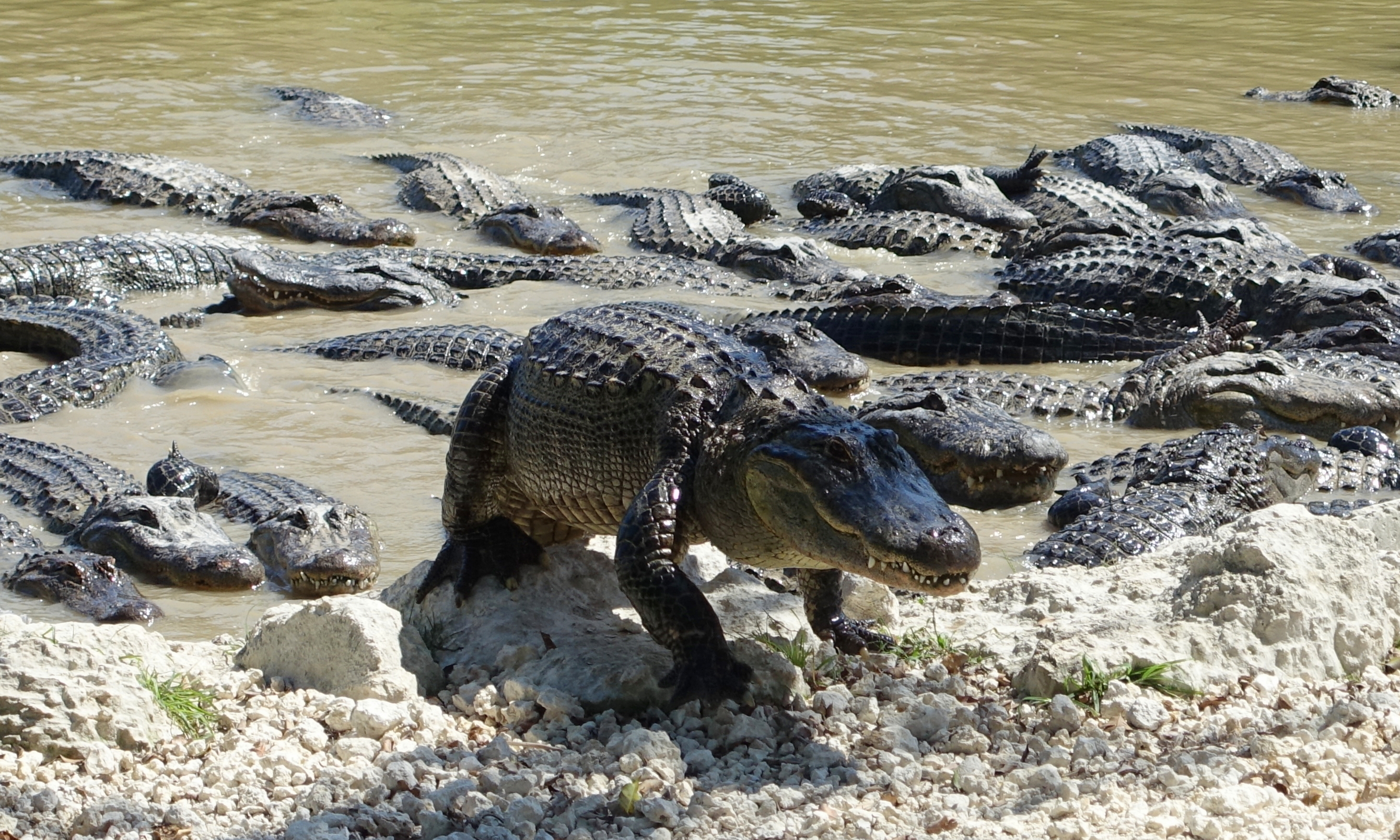
Over 2,000 alligators are at the farm.

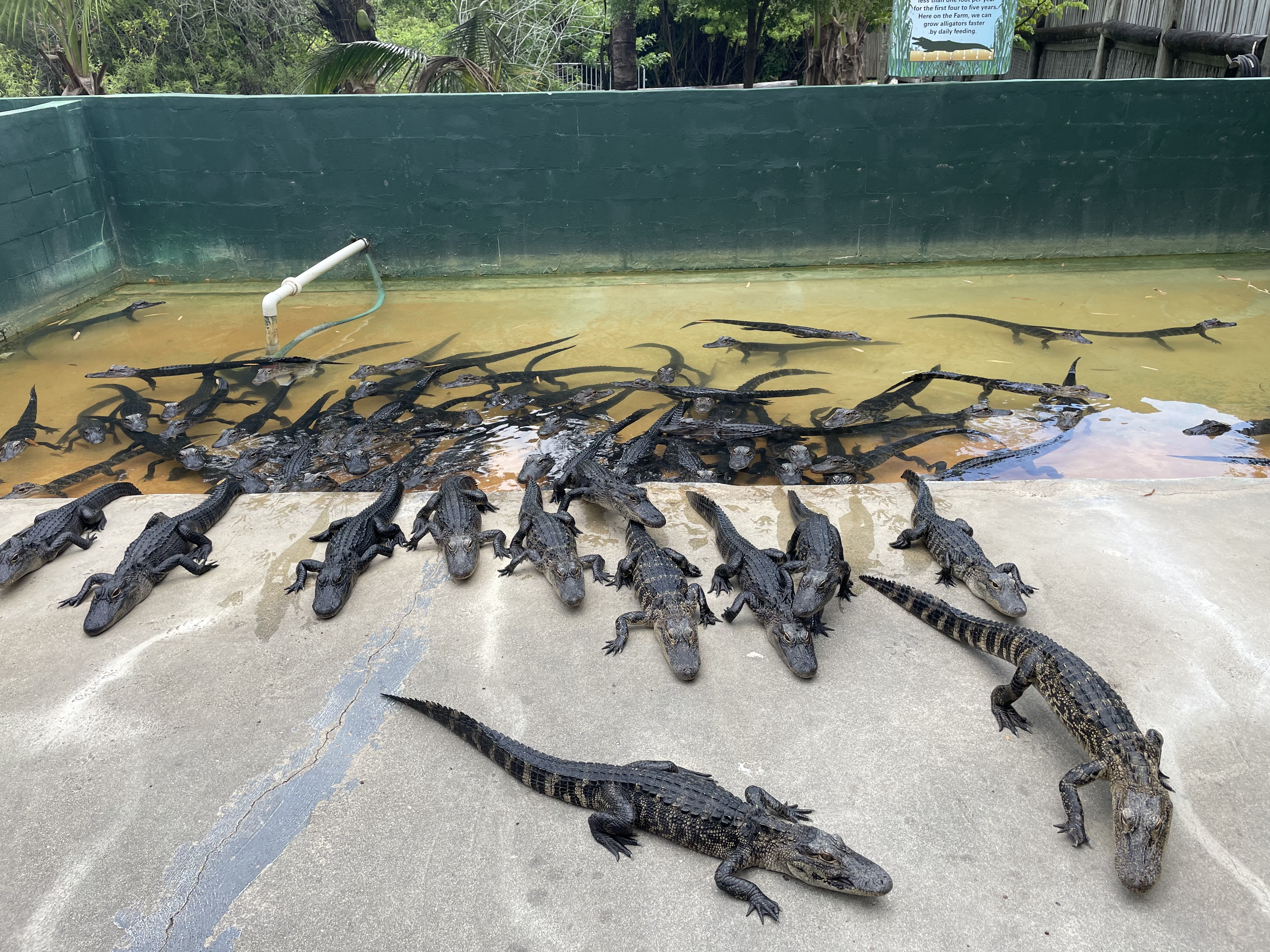
Young alligators grow faster than in the wild due to daily feeding.

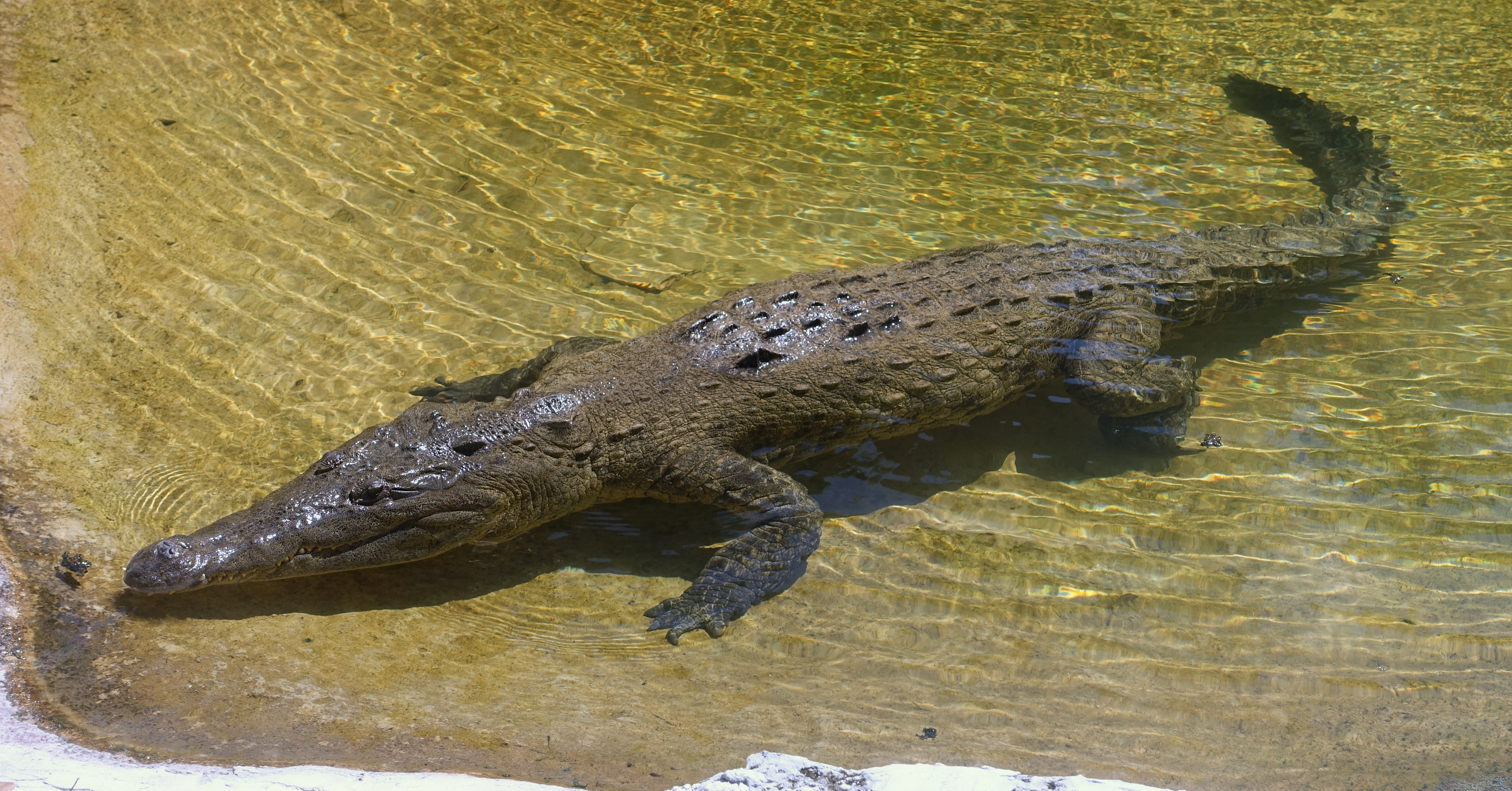
American crocodile (Crocodylus acutus).

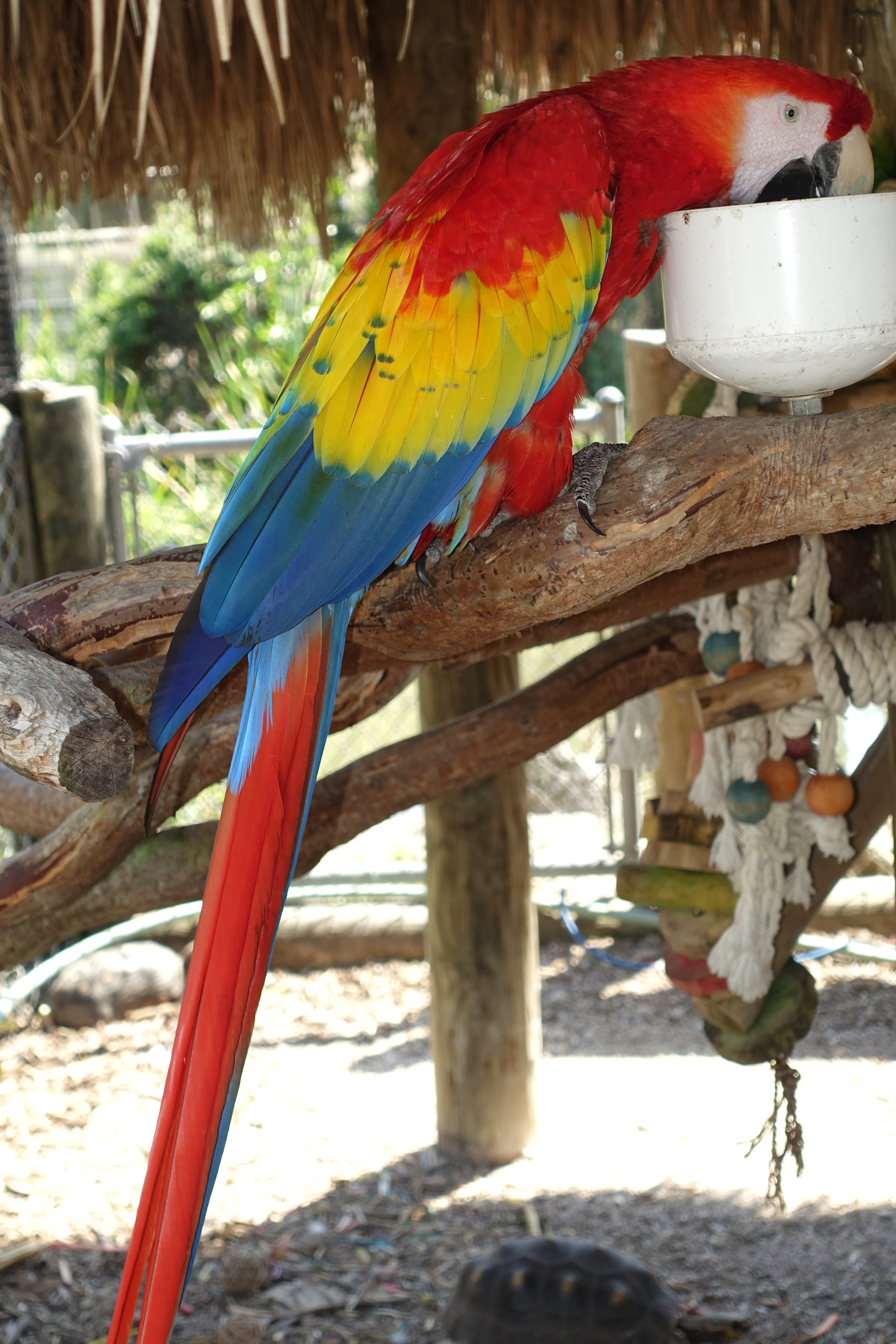
Scarlet macaw (Ara macao).

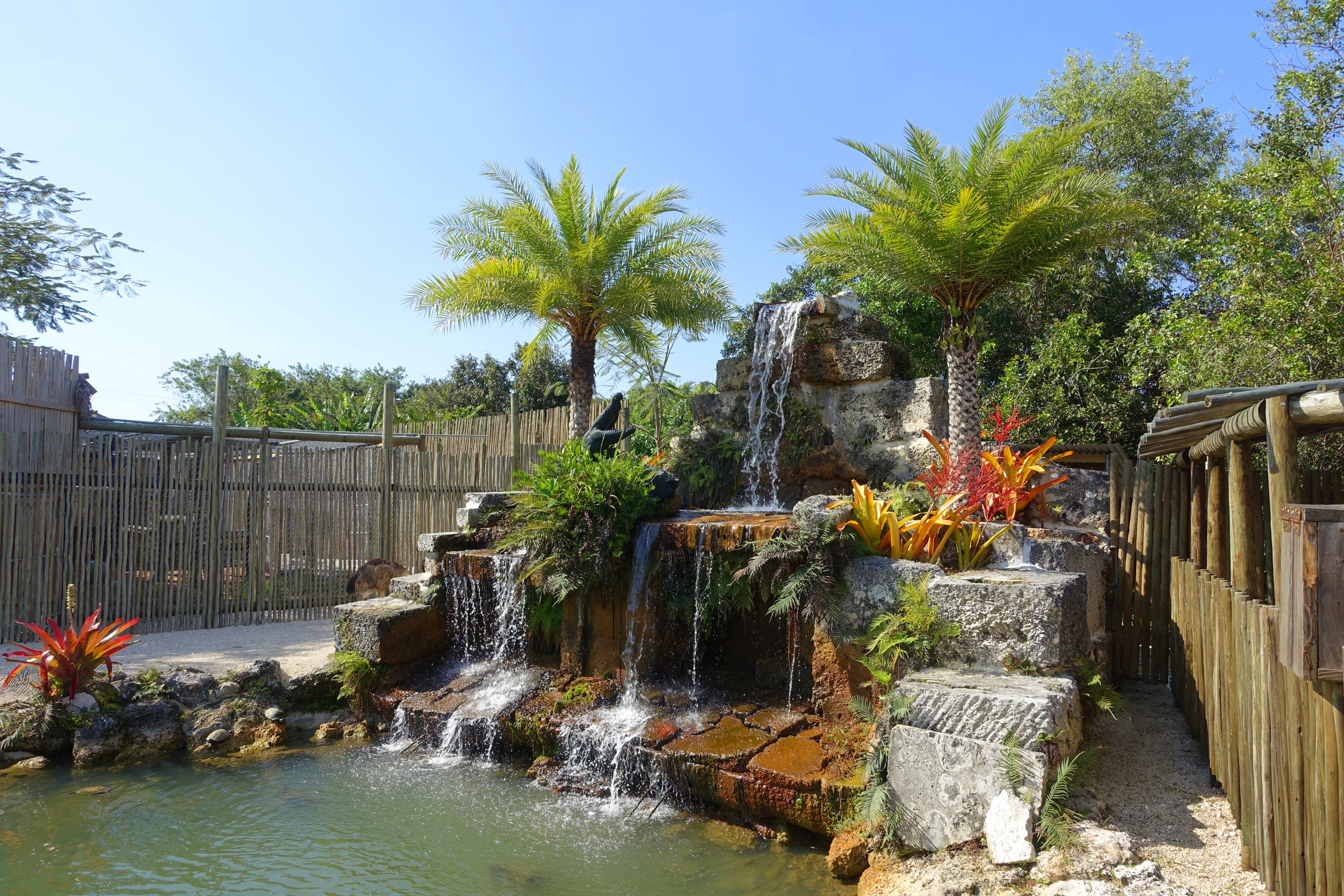
Waterfall with turtles.
