= 1995 Florida Gators baseball team =

American college baseball season

1995 Florida Gators baseball
- Conference: Southeastern Conference
- Record: 32–24 (12–14 SEC)
- Head coach: Andy Lopez (1st year)
- Home stadium: Alfred A. McKethan Stadium

1995 Southeastern Conference baseball standings
	Conf.				Overall
Team	W		L	PCT	W		L	PCT
Eastern
No. 4 Tennessee ^{x}‍†‍‡‍^{y}	22	–	8	.733	54	–	16	.771
Florida ‍‍‍	12	–	14	.462	32	–	24	.571
South Carolina ‍‍‍	12	–	14	.462	32	–	25	.561
Georgia ‍‍‍	9	–	17	.346	29	–	29	.500
Vanderbilt ‍‍‍	10	–	19	.345	29	–	32	.475
Kentucky ‍‍‍	8	–	19	.296	29	–	32	.475
Western
No. 9 Auburn ^{x}‍‍‍^{y}	19	–	8	.704	50	–	13	.794
No. 14 Alabama ‍‍‡‍^{y}	18	–	11	.621	42	–	23	.646
No. 18 LSU ‍‍‍^{y}	17	–	12	.586	47	–	18	.723
No. 17 Ole Miss ‍‍‍^{y}	14	–	12	.538	40	–	22	.645
Arkansas ‍‍‍^{y}	13	–	15	.464	38	–	23	.623
Mississippi State ‍‍‍	11	–	16	.407	34	–	25	.576
x – Division champion † – Conference champion ‡ – Tournament champion y – Invited to the NCAA tournament As of June 30, 1995; Rankings from Collegiate Baseball

The 1995 Florida Gators baseball team Season represented the University of Florida in the sport of baseball during the 1995 college baseball season. The Gators competed in Division I of the National Collegiate Athletic Association (NCAA) and the Eastern Division of the Southeastern Conference (SEC). They played their home games at Alfred A. McKethan Stadium, on the university's Gainesville, Florida campus. The team was the first at Florida coached by Andy Lopez.

== Roster ==
1995 Florida Gators baseball team
Players
Coaches

#	Pos.	Name	B/T	Height	Weight	Year	Home town
35	C	Eric Castaldo	R/R	6 ft 1 in (1.85 m)	180 lb (82 kg)	Jr	Altamonte Springs, FL
	RHP	Andrew Checketts	R/R	5 ft 10 in (1.78 m)	185 lb (84 kg)	Fr	West Linn, OR
	OF	Chris Chism	L/L	5 ft 9 in (1.75 m)	150 lb (68 kg)	Fr	Columbus, MS
18	INF	David Eckstein	R/R	5 ft 9 in (1.75 m)	160 lb (73 kg)	So	Sanford, FL
	OF	James Eidam	S/R	5 ft 11 in (1.8 m)	194 lb (88 kg)	Sr	Huntington Beach, CA
24	INF	Chuck Hazzard	R/R	6 ft 4 in (1.93 m)	210 lb (95 kg)	Fr	Dallas, TX
	LHP	John Kaufman	L/L	5 ft 10 in (1.78 m)	170 lb (77 kg)	So	Tampa, FL
	OF	Dean Kent	R/R	6 ft 4 in (1.93 m)	217 lb (98 kg)	So	Oldsmar, FL
12	INF	Chris Kokinda	R/R	6 ft 1 in (1.85 m)	202 lb (92 kg)	Sr	West Palm Beach, FL
	C	Chris Snyder	R/R	5 ft 8 in (1.73 m)	172 lb (78 kg)	So	Brownsburg, Indiana
	RHP	Darren McClellan	R/R	6 ft 2 in (1.88 m)	210 lb (95 kg)	So	Seminole, FL
34	RHP	Sean McClellan	R/R	6 ft 2 in (1.88 m)	215 lb (98 kg)	Jr	Seminole, FL
	INF	John Tamargo	L/R	5 ft 10 in (1.78 m)	188 lb (85 kg)	So	Tampa, FL
	INF	Chris Wiggs	R/R	5 ft 11 in (1.8 m)	186 lb (84 kg)	So	Lakeland, FL

Head coach

Andy Lopez

Assistant coach(es)

—

Legend

- (C) Team captain
- (S) Suspended
- (I) Ineligible
- Injured
- Current redshirt

Roster

== See also ==
- Florida Gators
- List of Florida Gators baseball players
