= 1995 Midwestern Collegiate Conference baseball tournament =

- Teams: 6
- Format: Double-elimination
- Finals site: Frank Eck Stadium; Notre Dame, Indiana
- Champions: Wright State (1st title)
- Winning coach: Ron Nischwitz (1st title)
- MVP: Kris Jarosz (Wright State)

1995 Midwestern Collegiate Conference baseball standings
	Conf.						Overall
Team	W		L		T	PCT	W		L		T	PCT
East
Detroit ^{x}‍‍‍	12	–	2	–	0	.857	28	–	18	–	0	.609
Wright State ‍‍‡‍	10	–	6	–	0	.625	33	–	28	–	0	.541
Xavier ‍‍‍	7	–	9	–	0	.438	28	–	30	–	0	.483
La Salle ‍‍‍	5	–	9	–	0	.357	15	–	35	–	0	.300
Cleveland State ‍‍‍	4	–	12	–	0	.250	13	–	41	–	1	.245
West
Notre Dame ^{x}‍‍‍	11	–	4	–	0	.733	40	–	21	–	0	.656
Northern Illinois ‍‍‍	9	–	7	–	0	.563	29	–	27	–	0	.518
UIC ‍‍‍	7	–	9	–	0	.438	21	–	28	–	0	.429
Milwaukee ‍‍‍	6	–	9	–	0	.400	21	–	24	–	0	.467
Butler ‍‍‍	6	–	10	–	0	.375	22	–	27	–	0	.449
x – Division champion ‡ – Tournament champion As of June 30, 1995; Rankings from Collegiate Baseball

The 1995 Midwestern Collegiate Conference baseball tournament took place in May 1995, near the close of the 1995 NCAA Division I baseball season. The top six finishers of the league's ten teams met in the double-elimination tournament held at Frank Eck Stadium on the campus of Notre Dame in Notre Dame, Indiana. Third seeded Wright State won their first Horizon League Championship. They fell in the play-in game and did not qualify for the 1995 NCAA Division I baseball tournament.

== Seeding and format ==
The league's teams are seeded one through six based on winning percentage, using conference games only. The top seed plays the sixth seed while the second seed plays the fifth seed and the third seed plays the fourth in the opening round.

Team	W	L	PCT	GB	Seed
East Division
Detroit	12	2	.857	—	1
Wright State	10	6	.625	3	3
Xavier	7	9	.438	6	5
La Salle	5	9	.357	7	—
Cleveland State	4	12	.250	8	—
West Division
Notre Dame	11	4	.733	—	2
Northern Illinois	9	7	.563	2.5	4
UIC	7	9	.438	4.5	6
Milwaukee	6	9	.400	5	—
Butler	6	10	.375	5.5	—

== Bracket and results ==
First round
1	Detroit	8
6	UIC	5
3	Wright State	9
4	Northern Illinois	5
2	Notre Dame	9
5	Xavier	7

Second round
1	Detroit	4
5	Xavier	6
6	UIC	5
4	Northern Illinois	10
3	Wright State	8
2	Notre Dame	11
1	Detroit	1
3	Wright State	3

Third round
5	Xavier	2
4	Northern Illinois	4
2	Notre Dame	6
3	Wright State	8

Semifinals
4	Northern Illinois	4
2	Notre Dame	12

Final
2	Notre Dame	5
3	Wright State	8

== All-Tournament Team ==
The following players were named to the All-Tournament Team.

Pos	Name	School
P	Doug Lowe	Wright State
P	Sean Sullins	Wright State
C	George Restovich	Notre Dame
1B	Kris Jarosz	Wright State
2B	Phil Long	Wright State
3B	Mike Amrhein	Notre Dame
SS	J.J. Brock	Notre Dame
OF	Brock Morrison	Northern Illinois
OF	Rowan Richards	Notre Dame
OF	Scott Sollmann	Notre Dame
DH	Matt Piskor	Wright State

=== Most Valuable Player ===
Kris Jarosz of Wright State was named Most Valuable Player of the Tournament.
