= 1995 Arizona Wildcats baseball team =

American college baseball season

1995 Arizona Wildcats baseball
- Conference: Pacific-10 Conference
- Record: 20–35–1 (6–24 Pac-10)
- Head coach: Jerry Kindall (23rd season)
- Assistant coach: Jerry Stitt (17th season)
- Home stadium: Sancet Stadium

1995 Pacific-10 Conference baseball standings
	Conf.				Overall
Team	W		L	PCT	W		L	PCT
Northern
Washington State ^{x}‍‍‍	18	–	12	.600	20	–	30	.400
Washington ‍‍‍	16	–	14	.533	24	–	30	.444
Gonzaga ‍‍‍	15	–	15	.500	29	–	25	.537
Oregon State ‍‍‍	14	–	16	.467	25	–	24	.510
Portland ‍‍‍	14	–	16	.467	24	–	25	.490
Portland State ‍‍‍	13	–	17	.433	19	–	36	.345
Southern
No. 2 Southern California ^{x}‍‍‍^{y}	21	–	9	.700	49	–	21	.700
No. 6 Stanford ‍‍‍^{y}	20	–	10	.667	40	–	25	.615
No. 29 California ‍‍‍	18	–	12	.600	32	–	25	.561
Arizona State ‍‍‍	13	–	17	.433	34	–	21	.618
UCLA ‍‍‍	12	–	18	.400	29	–	28	.509
Arizona ‍‍‍	6	–	24	.200	20	–	35	.364
x – Division champion y – Invited to the NCAA tournament As of June 30, 1997; Rankings from Collegiate Baseball

The 1995 Arizona Wildcats baseball team represented the University of Arizona during the 1995 NCAA Division I baseball season. The Wildcats played their home games at Frank Sancet Stadium. The team was coached by Jerry Kindall in his 23rd season at Arizona. The Wildcats finished 20-35-1 overall and placed 6th in the Pacific-10's Southern Division with a 6–24 record. This was the Wildcats' worst conference record during Kindall's tenure as well as their 2nd worst overall record (behind only the previous 1994 season). This marked the program's 2nd straight season finishing with a losing record, the first time this had occurred since 1983–1984. For only the 3rd time under Kindall's leadership, Arizona missed the postseason for a 2nd consecutive season.

== Previous season ==
The Wildcats finished the 1994 season with a record of 15-35 and 7–23 in conference play, finishing 6th in the "Six-Pac" (Pac-10 Southern). This marked the fewest number of wins the program had in a single season since winning only 12 games in 1949 (a year in which the team played only 18 games total) as well as the lowest win percentage in program history (.273). Arizona missed the postseason for 1st time since 1991.

== Personnel ==
=== Roster ===
1995 Arizona Wildcats baseball roster
• Frankie Acosta • Shawn Barrington • Russ Brown • Christopher Cooper • Kenny Corley • Clayton Crossan • Ryan Frace • Jeffrey Gjerde	• Matt Hendren • Scott Kidd • Kirt Kishita • Erik Mattern • Jeff McCannon • Pat McMillan	• Colin Porter • John Powers • Zachary Pringle • Diego Rico • Kevin Skinner • A.C. Smith • Jason Thrower • Ben White

=== Coaches ===
1995 Arizona Wildcats baseball coaching staff
- Jerry Kindall - Head coach
- Jerry Stitt - Assistant coach

== 1995 Schedule and results ==
1995 Arizona Wildcats baseball game log
Regular season
Date	Opponent	Site/Stadium	Score	Overall Record	Pac-10 Record
Jan 27	New Mexico	Sancet Stadium • Tucson, AZ	W 8-7	1-0-0	
Jan 28	New Mexico	Sancet Stadium • Tucson, AZ	L 4-10	1-1-0	
Jan 29	New Mexico	Sancet Stadium • Tucson, AZ	W 6-5	2-1-0	
Feb 2	BYU	Sancet Stadium • Tucson, AZ	W 11-10	3-1-0	
Feb 3	BYU	Sancet Stadium • Tucson, AZ	W 2-1	4-1-0	
Feb 4	BYU	Sancet Stadium • Tucson, AZ	L 4-8	4-2-0	
Feb 6	Saint Mary's	Sancet Stadium • Tucson, AZ	L 8-14	4-3-0	
Feb 7	Saint Mary's	Sancet Stadium • Tucson, AZ	L 8-11	4-4-0	
Feb 8	Cal State Fullerton	Sancet Stadium • Tucson, AZ	L 2-10	4-5-0	
Feb 10	Cal State Fullerton	Sancet Stadium • Tucson, AZ	L 2-10	4-6-0	
Feb 12	Cal State Fullerton	Sancet Stadium • Tucson, AZ	L 1-6	4-7-0	
Feb 14	Cal State Dominguez Hills	Sancet Stadium • Tucson, AZ	W 4-3	5-7-0	
Feb 17	at Hawaii-Hilo	Wong Stadium • Hilo, HI	L 4-5	5-8-0	
Feb 18	at Hawaii-Hilo	Wong Stadium • Hilo, HI	W 17-3	6-8-0	
Feb 18	at Hawaii-Hilo	Wong Stadium • Hilo, HI	W 17-10	7-8-0	
Feb 19	at Hawaii-Hilo	Wong Stadium • Hilo, HI	W 8-0	8-8-0	
Feb 21	Saint Francis (NY)	Sancet Stadium • Tucson, AZ	W 24-3	9-8-0	
Feb 22	Saint Francis (NY)	Sancet Stadium • Tucson, AZ	W 40-10	10-8-0	
Feb 24	at Texas A&M	Olsen Field • College Station, TX	L 1-4	10-9-0	
Feb 25	at Texas A&M	Olsen Field • College Station, TX	L 5-11	10-10-0	
Feb 26	at Texas A&M	Olsen Field • College Station, TX	T 3-3	10-10-1	
Feb 28	New Mexico State	Sancet Stadium • Tucson, AZ	W 5-3	11-10-1	
Mar 1	New Mexico State	Sancet Stadium • Tucson, AZ	W 10-8	12-10-1	
Mar 3	Arizona State	Sancet Stadium • Tucson, AZ	W 9-8	13-10-1	1-0
Mar 4	at Arizona State	Packard Stadium • Tempe, AZ	L 2-5	13-11-1	1-1
Mar 5	at Arizona State	Packard Stadium • Tempe, AZ	L 7-11	13-12-1	1-2
Mar 10	UCLA	Sancet Stadium • Tucson, AZ	L 3-19	13-13-1	1-3
Mar 11	UCLA	Sancet Stadium • Tucson, AZ	W 6-5	14-13-1	2-3
Mar 12	UCLA	Sancet Stadium • Tucson, AZ	L 2-4	14-14-1	2-4
Mar 17	California	Sancet Stadium • Tucson, AZ	L 7-10	14-15-1	2-5
Mar 18	California	Sancet Stadium • Tucson, AZ	L 8-9	14-16-1	2-6
Mar 19	California	Sancet Stadium • Tucson, AZ	L 8-12	14-17-1	2-7
Mar 21	at Grand Canyon	Brazell Stadium • Phoenix, AZ	L 7-8	14-18-1	
Mar 24	at USC	Dedeaux Field • Los Angeles, CA	L 3-7	14-19-1	2-8
Mar 25	at USC	Dedeaux Field • Los Angeles, CA	W 8-6	15-19-1	3-8
Mar 26	at USC	Dedeaux Field • Los Angeles, CA	L 8-11	15-20-1	3-9
Mar 31	Stanford	Sancet Stadium • Tucson, AZ	L 8-12	15-21-1	3-10
Apr 1	Stanford	Sancet Stadium • Tucson, AZ	L 5-8	15-22-1	3-11
Apr 2	Stanford	Sancet Stadium • Tucson, AZ	L 3-18	15-23-1	3-12
Apr 8	at California	Evans Diamond • Berkeley, CA	W 7-3	16-23-1	4-12
Apr 8	at California	Evans Diamond • Berkeley, CA	L 5-10	16-24-1	4-13
Apr 9	at California	Evans Diamond • Berkeley, CA	L 6-11	16-25-1	4-14
Apr 11	Grand Canyon	Sancet Stadium • Tucson, AZ	W 17-8	17-25-1	
Apr 13	at UCLA	Jackie Robinson Stadium • Los Angeles, CA	L 1-7	17-26-1	4-15
Apr 14	at UCLA	Jackie Robinson Stadium • Los Angeles, CA	L 6-8	17-27-1	4-16
Apr 15	at UCLA	Jackie Robinson Stadium • Los Angeles, CA	L 10-11	17-28-1	4-17
Apr 21	at Arizona State	Packard Stadium • Tempe, AZ	L 0-7	17-29-1	4-18
Apr 22	Arizona State	Sancet Stadium • Tucson, AZ	L 4-6	17-30-1	4-19
Apr 23	Arizona State	Sancet Stadium • Tucson, AZ	W 7-6	18-30-1	5-19
Apr 26	Grand Canyon	Sancet Stadium • Tucson, AZ	W 13-5	19-30-1	
Apr 28	at Stanford	Sunken Diamond • Palo Alto, CA	L 1-7	19-31-1	5-20
Apr 29	at Stanford	Sunken Diamond • Palo Alto, CA	W 8-6	20-31-1	6-20
Apr 30	at Stanford	Sunken Diamond • Palo Alto, CA	L 3-4	20-32-1	6-21
May 13	USC	Sancet Stadium • Tucson, AZ	L 3-11	20-33-1	6-22
May 14	USC	Sancet Stadium • Tucson, AZ	L 4-15	20-34-1	6-23
May 15	USC	Sancet Stadium • Tucson, AZ	L 8-9	20-35-1	6-24

== 1995 MLB draft ==
Player	Position	Round	Overall	MLB team
Anthony Marnell	C	22	593	San Diego Padres
