= 1995 Southeastern Conference baseball tournament =

- Teams: 6
- Format: Six-team double elimination tournament
- Finals site: Lindsey Nelson Stadium; Knoxville, Tennessee
- Champions: Tennessee (3rd title)
- Winning coach: Rod Delmonico (3rd title)
- MVP: Todd Helton, Scott Vieira (Tennessee)
- Attendance: 12,572

1995 Southeastern Conference baseball tournament
- Teams: 6
- Format: Six-team double elimination tournament
- Finals site: Dudy Noble Field; Starkville, Mississippi
- Champions: Alabama (2nd title)
- Winning coach: Jim Wells (1st title)
- MVP: Rusty Loflin (Alabama)
- Attendance: 22,017

1995 Southeastern Conference baseball standings
	Conf.				Overall
Team	W		L	PCT	W		L	PCT
Eastern
No. 4 Tennessee ^{x}‍†‍‡‍^{y}	22	–	8	.733	54	–	16	.771
Florida ‍‍‍	12	–	14	.462	32	–	24	.571
South Carolina ‍‍‍	12	–	14	.462	32	–	25	.561
Georgia ‍‍‍	9	–	17	.346	29	–	29	.500
Vanderbilt ‍‍‍	10	–	19	.345	29	–	32	.475
Kentucky ‍‍‍	8	–	19	.296	29	–	32	.475
Western
No. 9 Auburn ^{x}‍‍‍^{y}	19	–	8	.704	50	–	13	.794
No. 14 Alabama ‍‍‡‍^{y}	18	–	11	.621	42	–	23	.646
No. 18 LSU ‍‍‍^{y}	17	–	12	.586	47	–	18	.723
No. 17 Ole Miss ‍‍‍^{y}	14	–	12	.538	40	–	22	.645
Arkansas ‍‍‍^{y}	13	–	15	.464	38	–	23	.623
Mississippi State ‍‍‍	11	–	16	.407	34	–	25	.576
x – Division champion † – Conference champion ‡ – Tournament champion y – Invited to the NCAA tournament As of June 30, 1995; Rankings from Collegiate Baseball

The 1995 Southeastern Conference baseball tournament was held as separate tournaments for the Eastern Division and the Western Division. The Eastern Division tournament was held at Lindsey Nelson Stadium in Knoxville, Tennessee. The Western Division tournament was held at Dudy Noble Field in Starkville, MS. Both tournaments were held from May 18 through 21. Tennessee won its third consecutive Eastern Division tournament and Alabama won the Western Division tournament. All games played in the tournament were added to the teams' 24-game regular season conference records.

As the tournament champion with the highest conference winning percentage, Tennessee was named SEC champion and awarded the league's automatic bid to the NCAA tournament.

== Regular-season results ==
Eastern Division
Team	W	L	Pct	GB	Seed
Tennessee	22	8	.733	—	1
South Carolina	12	14	.462	8	2
Florida	12	14	.462	8	3
Georgia	9	17	.346	11	4
Kentucky	10	19	.345	11.5	5
Vanderbilt	8	19	.296	12.5	6

Western Division
Team	W	L	Pct	GB	Seed
Auburn	19	8	.704	—	1
Alabama	18	11	.621	2	2
LSU	17	12	.586	3	3
Ole Miss	14	12	.538	4.5	4
Arkansas	13	15	.464	6.5	5
Mississippi State	11	16	.407	8	6

== Tournaments ==
=== Eastern Division ===
First round
1	Tennessee	4
6	Vanderbilt	9
5	Kentucky	6
2	South Carolina	2
4	Georgia	6
3	Florida	4

Second round
6	Vanderbilt	4
3	Florida	2
5	Kentucky	9
4	Georgia	8
1	Tennessee	8
2	South Carolina	0

Third round
6	Vanderbilt	6
5	Kentucky	9
1	Tennessee	11
4	Georgia	0

Semifinals
1	Tennessee	4
6	Vanderbilt	3

Final
5	Kentucky	5	2
1	Tennessee	22	7

=== Western Division ===
First round
6	Mississippi State	1
1	Auburn	0
5	Arkansas	5
4	Ole Miss	2
2	Alabama	9
3	LSU	8

Second round
6	Mississippi State	6
3	LSU	14
1	Auburn	10
4	Ole Miss	3
5	Arkansas	5
2	Alabama	2
6	Mississippi State	3
2	Alabama	6

Third round
3	LSU	7
1	Auburn	5
5	Arkansas	7
2	Alabama	8

Semifinals
3	LSU	7
5	Arkansas	6

Final
3	LSU	8
2	Alabama	9

== All-Tournament Teams ==
Position	Player	School
Eastern Division
1B	Todd Helton	Tennessee
2B	Ed Lewis	Tennessee
SS	Pete Arenas	Georgia
3B	Scott Vieira	Tennessee
C	Todd Young	Kentucky
OF	Josh Paul	Vanderbilt
OF	Chad Green	Kentucky
OF	Scott Schroeffel	Tennessee
DH	Ryan Brown	Vanderbilt
P	Ryan Meyers	Tennessee
P	Scott Schroeffel	Tennessee
Co-MVP	Todd Helton	Tennessee
Co-MVP	Scott Vieira	Tennessee

Position	Player	School
Western Division
1B	Chris Moller	Alabama
2B	Warren Morris	LSU
SS	Mark Bellhorn	Auburn
3B	Nathan Dunn	LSU
C	David Skeels	Arkansas
OF	Kenderick Moore	Arkansas
OF	Rusty Loflin	Alabama
OF	Chad Cooley	LSU
DH	Eddy Furniss	LSU
P	Neal Lamb	Alabama
P	Matt Carnes	Arkansas
P	Eric DuBose	Mississippi State
MVP	Rusty Loflin	Alabama

== See also ==
- College World Series
- NCAA Division I Baseball Championship
- Southeastern Conference baseball tournament
