= 1995 Mid-Continent Conference baseball tournament =

- Teams: 4
- Format: Double-elimination
- Finals site: Monier Field; Charleston, Illinois
- Champions: Troy State (1st title)
- Winning coach: John Mayotte (1st title)
- MVP: Jason Fawcett (Troy State)

1995 Mid-Continent Conference baseball standings
| | Conf. | | | | | | Overall |
| Team | W | | L | | T | PCT | W | | L | | T | PCT |
|---|---|---|---|---|---|---|---|---|---|---|---|---|
East
| Youngstown State ^{x}‍‍‍ | 16 | – | 4 | – | 0 | .800 | 37 | – | 17 | – | 0 | .685 |
| Troy State ‍‍‡‍^{y} | 13 | – | 6 | – | 0 | .684 | 27 | – | 23 | – | 1 | .539 |
| Pace ‍‍‍ | 10 | – | 10 | – | 0 | .500 | 21 | – | 26 | – | 1 | .448 |
| Central Connecticut ‍‍‍ | 7 | – | 13 | – | 0 | .350 | 16 | – | 25 | – | 0 | .390 |
| NYIT ‍‍‍ | 7 | – | 13 | – | 0 | .350 | 23 | – | 22 | – | 1 | .511 |
| C.W. Post ‍‍‍ | 6 | – | 13 | – | 0 | .316 | 18 | – | 29 | – | 0 | .383 |
West
| Eastern Illinois ^{x}‍‍‍ | 15 | – | 5 | – | 0 | .750 | 28 | – | 19 | – | 0 | .596 |
| Western Illinois ‍‍‍ | 12 | – | 10 | – | 0 | .545 | 21 | – | 21 | – | 1 | .500 |
| Northeastern Illinois ‍‍‍ | 12 | – | 12 | – | 0 | .500 | 17 | – | 35 | – | 0 | .327 |
| Valparaiso ‍‍‍ | 10 | – | 14 | – | 0 | .417 | 23 | – | 29 | – | 0 | .442 |
| Chicago State ‍‍‍ | 7 | – | 15 | – | 0 | .318 | 16 | – | 29 | – | 0 | .356 |
‡ – Tournament champion y – Invited to the NCAA tournament As of June 30, 1995; Rankings from Collegiate Baseball

The 1995 Mid-Continent Conference Tournament took place from May 12 through 15. The top two regular season finishers of each of the league's two divisions met in the double-elimination tournament held at Monier Field on the campus of Eastern Illinois University in Charleston, Illinois. Troy State won the tournament for the first time.

== Format and seeding ==
The top two teams from each division advanced to the tournament.

East Division
| Team | W | L | Pct. | GB | Seed |
|---|---|---|---|---|---|
| Youngstown State | 16 | 4 | .800 | — | 1E |
| Troy State | 13 | 6 | .684 | 2.5 | 2E |
| Pace | 10 | 10 | .500 | 6 | — |
| Central Connecticut | 7 | 13 | .350 | 9 | — |
| NYIT | 7 | 13 | .350 | 9 | — |
| C.W. Post | 6 | 13 | .316 | 9.5 | — |

West Division
| Team | W | L | Pct. | GB | Seed |
|---|---|---|---|---|---|
| Eastern Illinois | 15 | 5 | .750 | — | 1W |
| Western Illinois | 12 | 10 | .545 | 4 | 2W |
| Northeastern Illinois | 12 | 12 | .500 | 5 | — |
| Valparaiso | 10 | 14 | .417 | 7 | — |
| Chicago State | 7 | 15 | .318 | 9 | — |

== Tournament ==
Upper round 1
1E | Youngstown State | 1
2W | Western Illinois | 11
1W | Eastern Illinois | 6
2E | Troy State | 13
Lower round 1
1E | Youngstown State | 4^{14}
1W | Eastern Illinois | 3

Upper final
2E | Troy State | 8
2W | Western Illinois | 7
Lower final
2W | Western Illinois | 3
1E | Youngstown State | 0

Final
2E | Troy State | 12 | —
2W | Western Illinois | 9 | —

=== Game-by-game results ===
| Game | Winner | Score | Loser | Comment |
|---|---|---|---|---|
| 1 | (2W) Western Illinois | 11–1 | (1E) Youngstown State | |
| 2 | (2E) Troy State | 13–6 | (1W) Eastern Illinois | |
| 3 | (1W) Youngstown State | 4–3 (14) | (1W) Eastern Illinois | Eastern Illinois eliminated |
| 4 | (2E) Troy State | 8–7 | (2W) Western Illinois | |
| 5 | (2W) Western Illinois | 3–0 | (1W) Youngstown State | Youngstown State eliminated |
| 6 | (2E) Troy State | 12–9 | (2W) Western Illinois | Troy State wins Mid-Con Championship |

== All-Tournament Team ==
| Name | School |
|---|---|
| Steve Bishop | Western Illinois |
| Jason Fawcett | Troy State |
| Reggie Hightower | Troy State |
| Scott Hitchcock | Youngstown State |
| Kerrick Leatherwood | Western Illinois |
| Jim Morsovillo | Western Illinois |
| Andy Murphy | Western Illinois |
| Alex Rosa | Troy State |
| Melesio Salazar | Eastern Illinois |
| Arnold Settles | Troy State |
| Matt Wahrenburg | Western Illinois |

=== Tournament Most Valuable Player ===
Jason Fawcett of Troy State was named Tournament MVP.
