= Homestead Historic Downtown District =

Historic district in Florida, United States

- U.S. National Register of Historic Places
- U.S. Historic district
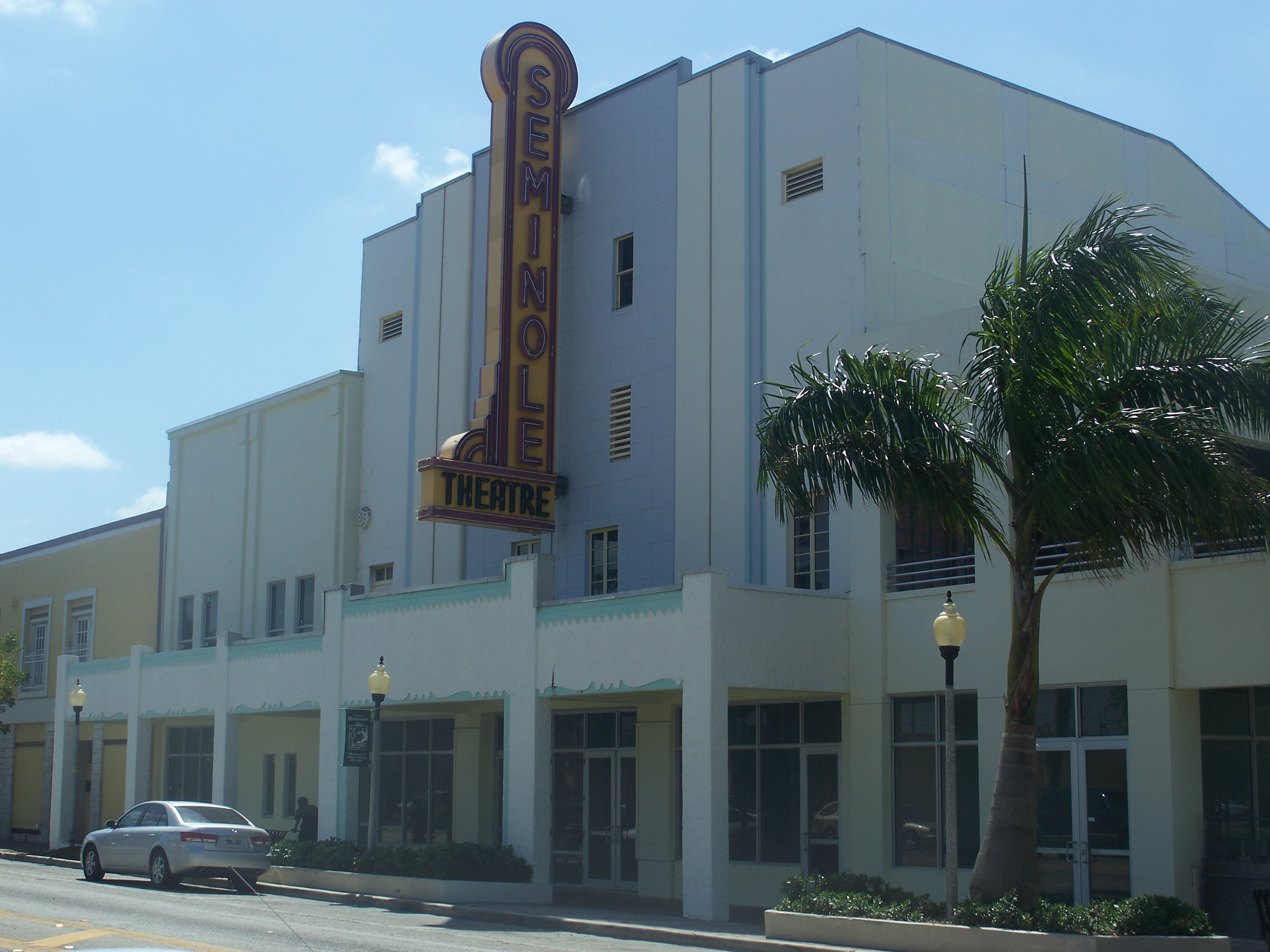
- Seminole Theatre

- Location within Florida Location within the United States
- Location: Homestead, Florida
- Coordinates: 25°28′06.34″N 80°28′45.80″W
- NRHP reference No.: 07001199
- Added to NRHP: November 19, 2007

The Homestead Historic Downtown District, is a U.S. Historic District (designated as such on November 19, 2007) located in Homestead, Florida, United States. It is bound by Northwest 4th Street, South Railroad Avenue, Southeast 1st Road and North Krome Drive.

== Seminole Theater ==
Originally opened in 1921, the 500-seat Seminole on Krome Avenue was built for Henry Booker, Sr. and James Washington English for movies and live entertainment. The theater was heavily damaged in a 1940 fire, leaving little more than a blackened shell.

Prolific theater architect Roy A. Benjamin was hired to rebuild the Seminole, which he designed in Streamline Moderne style. The cost of the movie theater's reconstruction was around $50,000. It reopened in fall of 1940. In addition to movies, the Seminole continued to host live entertainment, as well as beauty contests and cooking demonstrations. In the early 1970s, the Seminole was renamed the Premier Theatre and began to show Spanish-language movies. It closed in 1979 due to declining attendance.

For years, the theater sat vacant and fell into disrepair. In 1992, when Hurricane Andrew hit the Homestead area, the Seminole was not spared, and though its walls stood, the roof was torn off and the theater's interior suffered serious damage. In 1993, the Seminole Theater's owners donated the battered theater to the city, which designed it a local historic site two years later, the sole remaining example of Art Moderne style in all Dade County.

The Seminole Theater Group was organized in 1997 with the intention of restoring the theater as a performing arts venue serving the Homestead and Dade County region. It is expected to cost about $4.2 million to bring the old Seminole back to life. The Seminole Theatre was reopened October 28, 2015.

== Gallery ==
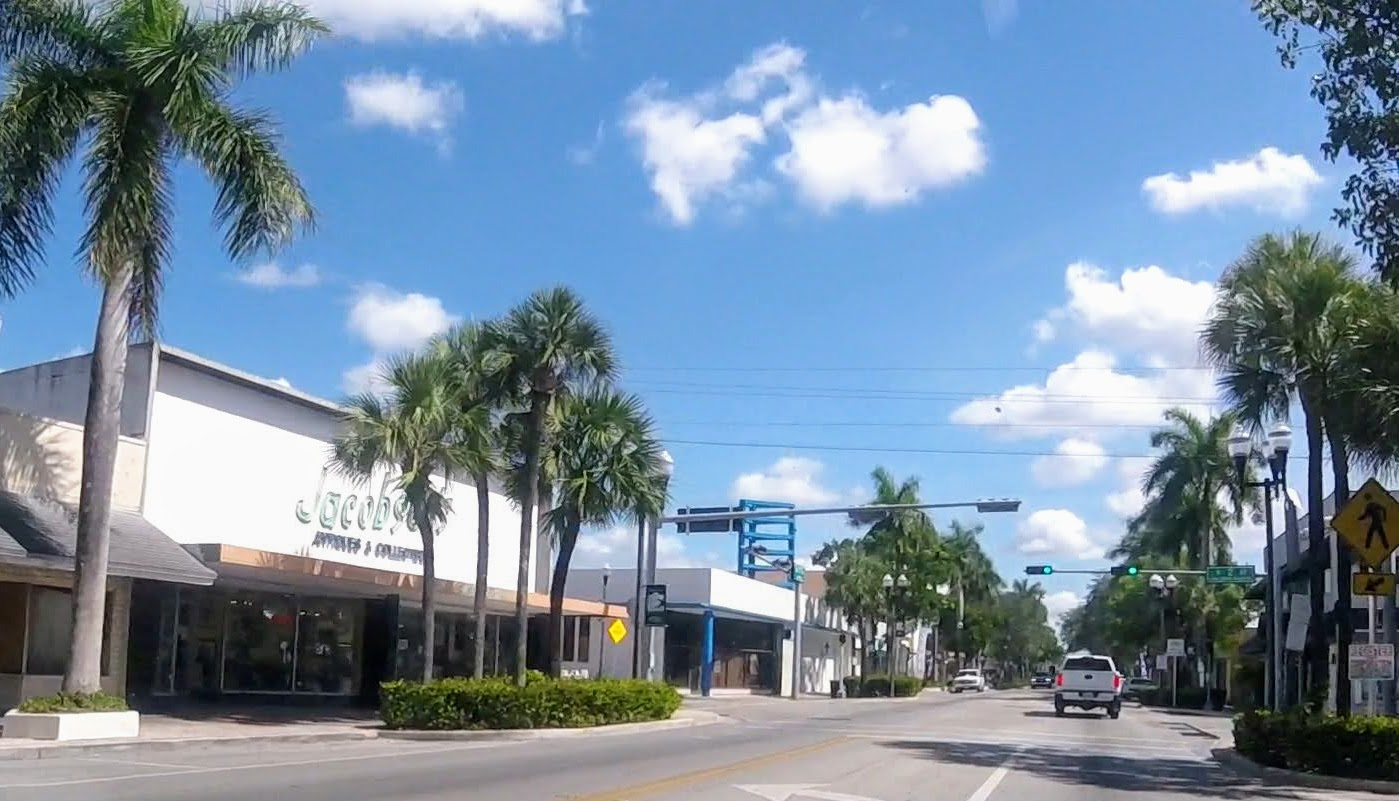
N. Krome Avenue - July 2020

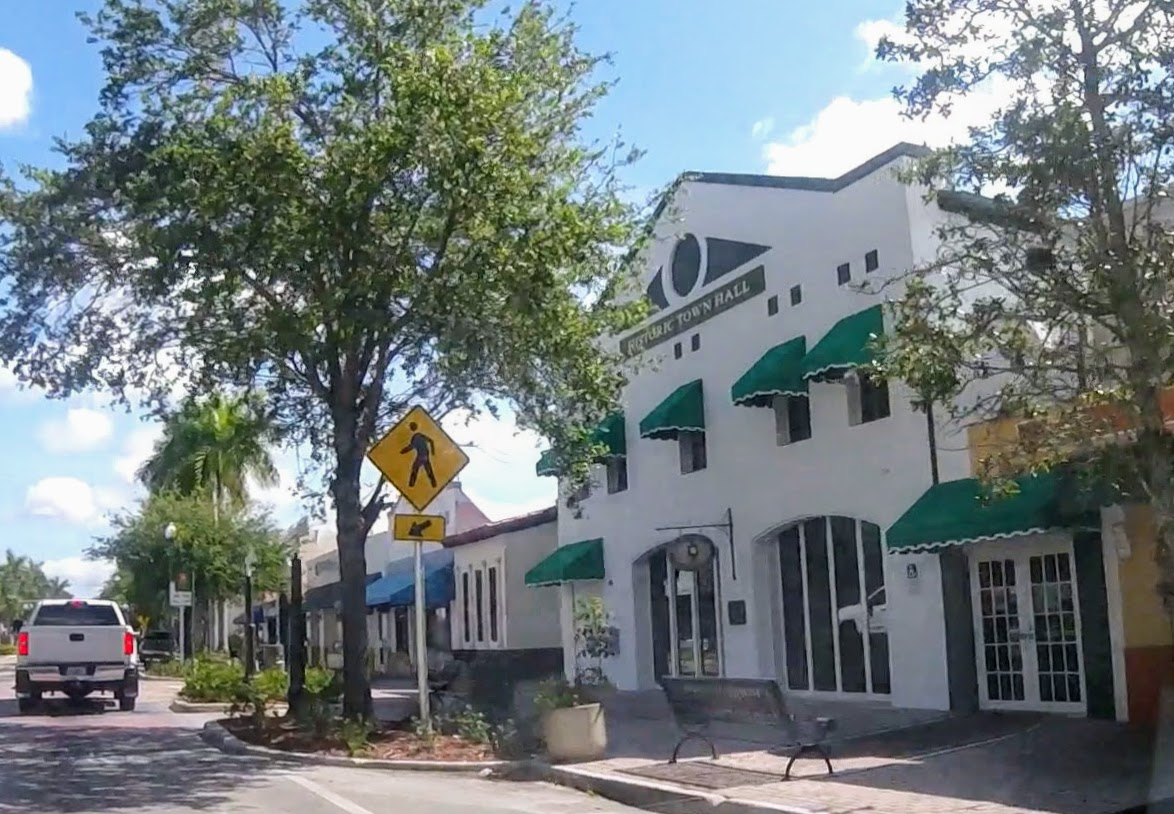
Homestead Town Hall - July 2020
