= Homestead Sports Complex =

Baseball training facility in Florida, US

- Location within Florida Location within the United States
- Interactive map of Homestead Sports Complex
- Address: 1601 SE 28th Ave; Homestead, Florida 33035
- Coordinates: 25.45161°N 80.43095°W
- Owner: City of Homestead
- Capacity: Baseball - 6,500
- Surface: Grass
- Field size: Left field: 322 ft (98 m); Center field: 400 ft (120 m); Right field: 322 ft (98 m)

Construction
- Groundbreaking: 1991
- Built: 1991 & 1993
- Demolished: May 20, 2019
- Architect: HOK Sport
- Structural engineers: Bliss & Nyitray, Inc

Tenants
- Florida Legends (LLB) 1998; Florida Thunder (PC) 2004

Homestead Sports Complex was a baseball training facility located less than three miles from downtown Homestead, Florida. The facility seated 6,500 and expanded to 9,000, and provided parking for over 3,900 vehicles. A 200-bed dormitory facility located on the grounds of the Homestead Sports Complex complemented the training facilities. The dormitories consisted of 30 single rooms and 84 double rooms that were complete with restrooms, showers, dressing areas, a full service kitchen and recreational areas.

== History ==
In 1991 the City of Homestead built the Sports Complex at a price tag of $22 million in order to provide a spring training facility for the Cleveland Indians. The stadium was widely recognized as being state-of-the-art for the time period, as it included multiple practice facilities as well as dormitories for players. The Indians had previously played in the Cactus League in Arizona but had signed a deal to make Homestead their long-term spring training home. Cleveland was due to begin full-time play at the stadium in the 1993 season. In 1992 they had already begun moving equipment and personnel to Florida. However, on August 24, 1992, Hurricane Andrew made landfall in Homestead as a Category 5 cyclone with winds reaching 165 mph. The stadium, directly in the path of the hurricane, was decimated. The Indians quickly began meetings with lawyers and eventually they exercised an "out clause" in the contract.

The city decided to immediately re-construct the stadium hoping that they could have it built for the 1994 spring training season in order for the Indians, or perhaps another team to use. However, without a spring facility for the 1993 season Cleveland was forced to look quickly for another home. The Boston Red Sox were leaving Winter Haven, Florida's Chain of Lakes Park after 26 years, allowing the Indians to use Chain of Lakes as their spring facility. However, knowing the situation that the Indians were in, Winter Haven allowed the team to use the stadium on the condition that they sign a 10-year contract. Cleveland had no other choice, so they signed the deal and left Homestead without a team. (The Indians would eventually return to Arizona in 2009, sharing Goodyear Ballpark with their cross-Ohio rivals the Cincinnati Reds.)

Homestead decided to continue re-building the stadium, assuming that at some point in the future they could lure another team to use it as their spring facility. The stadium was re-constructed in a very short period of time, as the original blueprints were kept. However, after about five years without a tenant it started to appear that the facility may never be used as a home for baseball. In the meantime, new spring training facilities were constructed such as Roger Dean Stadium in Jupiter, Florida and Champion Stadium at Walt Disney World. The new stadiums began to surpass Homestead Sports Complex in terms of facility size and technology. The city had to look at other options in order to pay the nearly $450,000 per year in order to maintain it.

It was offered as a home for the US Soccer Federation to conduct its training, but they declined. The Florida Legends of the Ladies League Baseball (LLB) played their home games at Homestead in 1998. Scenes for the Oliver Stone football film Any Given Sunday were shot at the complex in 1999, the grounds being used as the practice facility for the fictional Miami Sharks. In 2002 an HBO series called Baseball Wives was to be primarily filmed at the stadium, but the show was canceled before ever getting off the ground. In 2004, it served as the home of the Florida Thunder, the city's Pro Cricket team. The facility hosted local youth and adult sports on the training grounds but the internal workings of the stadium such as bathrooms, electrical and plumbing had gone into disrepair. The park was used for the City of Homestead's Fourth of July celebration until the Homestead-Miami Speedway took over the duties in 2010, attracting an exponentially larger crowd than ever before.

The facility was damaged again by 2017's Hurricane Irma. After Hurricane Irma, the City Commission requested a feasibility study on the complex. Five of the six options in the study involve tearing down the ball park. The city solicited demolition bids. The ballpark was demolished on May 20, 2019. Prior to the structure being demolished, it served as a temporary police station while the city awaited the completion of its new police headquarters building. The city's police department had vacated its old headquarters in the Homestead Historic Downtown District prior to completion of the new headquarters building.
