= Miami Homestead General Aviation Airport =

- IATA: none; ICAO: none; FAA LID: X51

Summary
- Airport type: Public
- Owner: Miami-Dade County
- Operator: Miami-Dade Aviation Department (MDAD)
- Serves: Homestead, Florida
- Location: Miami-Dade County, Florida
- Elevation AMSL: 9 ft (2.7 m)
- Coordinates: 25°30′2″N 80°33′20″W
- Website: www.miami-airport.com/homestead.asp

Map
- Interactive map of Miami Homestead General Aviation Airport

Runways
Direction	Length		Surface
Direction	ft	m	Surface
18/36	3,999	1,219	Asphalt
10/28	3,000	913	Asphalt
9U/27U	2,500	762	Turf

Statistics (2002)
- Aircraft operations: 82,086
- Based aircraft: 82
- Source: Federal Aviation Administration

Miami Homestead General Aviation Airport (FAA LID: X51) is a county-owned public-use airport in unincorporated Miami-Dade County, Florida, United States, located 4.6 miles (7.4 km) northwest of the central business district of Homestead.

== History ==
The airport was renamed from "Homestead General Aviation Airport" to "Miami Homestead General Aviation Airport" in December 2014 by the Miami-Dade County Commission.

In 2026, the airport was named as a potential site for local aviation leaders to expand as a commercial reliever to the Miami International Airport. While MIA is nearing capacity, studies have found it is time to start developing new commercial aviation options so that projects are complete by the time MIA is at capacity. Other options include expanding the Miami Executive Airport or building a new airport from scratch.

== Facilities and aircraft ==
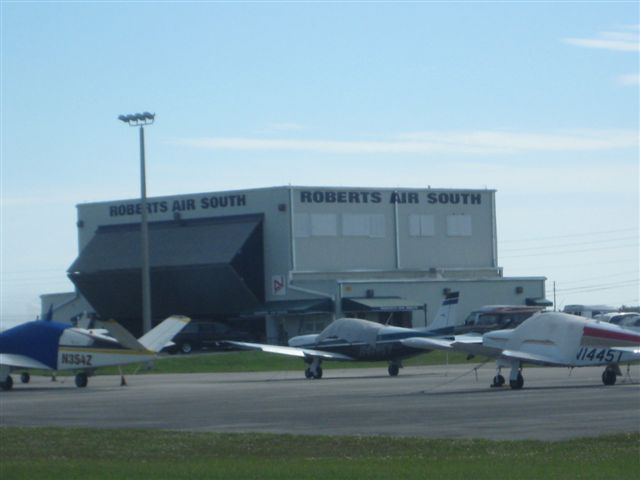
FBO

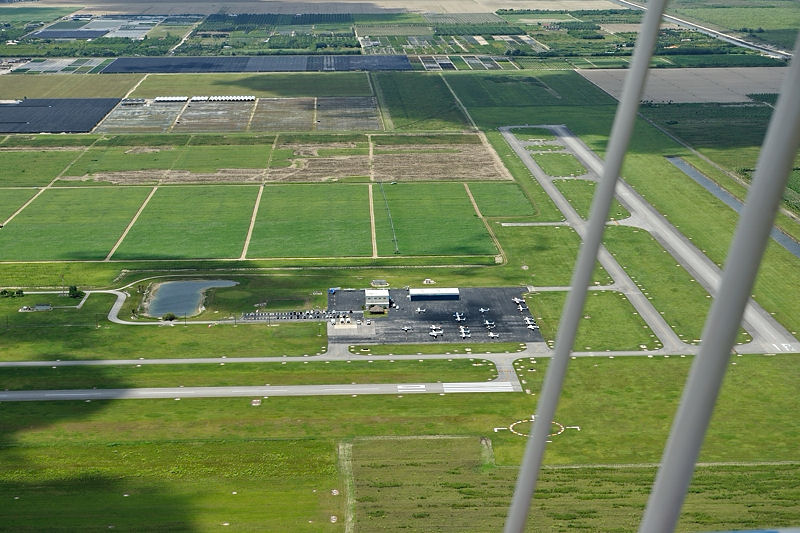
Runways

Homestead General Aviation Airport covers an area of 960 acres (390 ha) at an elevation of 9 feet (2.7 m) above mean sea level. It has two asphalt paved runways: 18/36 is 3,999 by 100 feet (1,219 x 30 m) and 10/28 is 3,000 by 75 feet (913 x 23 m). It also has one grass runway: 9U/27U is 2,500 by 150 feet (762 x 46 m).

For the 12-month period ending June 18, 2002, the airport had 72,084 aircraft operations, an average of 197 per day: 70% general aviation, 1% air taxi and 1% military. At that time there were 64 aircraft based at this airport: 66% single-engine and 13% multi-engine airplanes, 19% ultralight, 3% helicopter and 43% glider

There is extensive glider activity due to the presence of Miami Gliders, a glider flight school, operating out of runway 9 turf. Homestead is also the home of Skydive Miami.

== See also ==
- List of airports in Florida
