= 1995 Ivy League Baseball Championship Series =

1995 Ivy League baseball tournament
- Teams: 2
- Format: Best of three series
- Finals site: Yale Field; New Haven, Connecticut
- Champions: Penn (1st title)
- Winning coach: Bob Seddon (1st title)

1995 Ivy League baseball standings
	Conf.						Overall
Team	W		L		T	PCT	W		L		T	PCT
Lou Gehrig
Penn ^{x}‍‍‡‍^{y}	13	–	5	–	0	.722	25	–	21	–	0	.543
Cornell ‍‍‍	10	–	10	–	0	.500	20	–	19	–	0	.513
Columbia ‍‍‍	9	–	9	–	0	.500	15	–	24	–	1	.388
Princeton ‍‍‍	8	–	12	–	0	.400	15	–	26	–	0	.366
Red Rolfe
Yale ^{x}‍‍‍	13	–	7	–	0	.650	23	–	20	–	0	.535
Dartmouth ‍‍‍	12	–	8	–	0	.600	19	–	17	–	0	.528
Brown ‍‍‍	7	–	13	–	0	.350	14	–	27	–	0	.341
Harvard ‍‍‍	6	–	14	–	0	.300	10	–	25	–	0	.286
x – Division champion ‡ – Championship Series champion y – Invited to the NCAA tournament As of June 30, 1995; Rankings from Collegiate Baseball

The 1995 Ivy League Baseball Championship Series took place at Yale Field in New Haven, Connecticut, on May 6, 1995. The series matched the regular season champions of each of the league's two divisions. Penn, the winner of the series, claimed their first title and the Ivy League's automatic berth in the 1995 NCAA Division I baseball tournament. It was Penn's second consecutive, and second overall appearance in the Championship Series.

Yale made their third consecutive appearance in the Championship Series, winning the first two events in 1993 and 1994.

== Results ==
Finals
Penn	6	6	—
Yale	5	5	—
