= Homestead, Florida =

- City
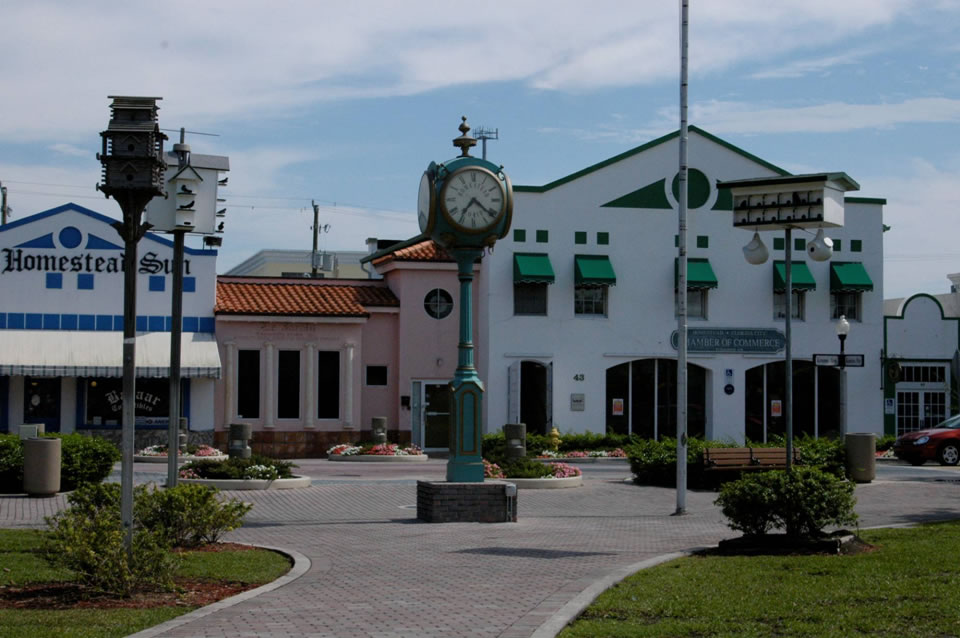
- Homestead Historic Downtown District

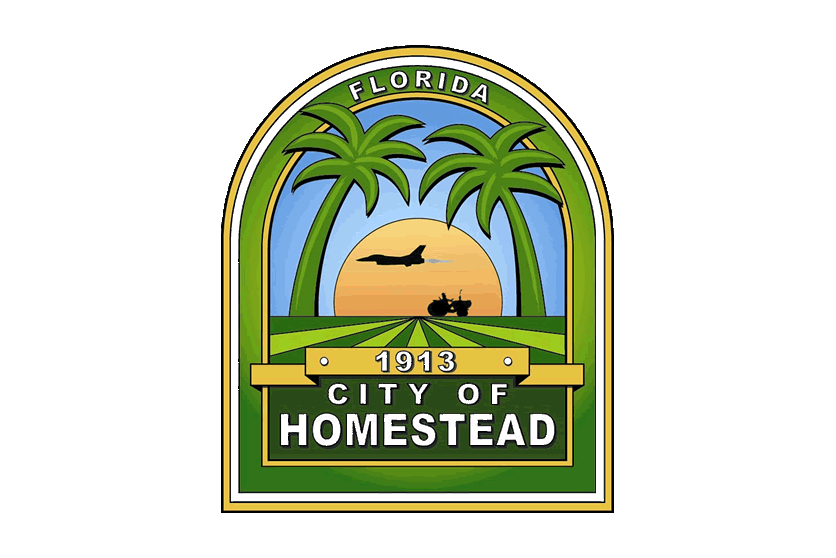
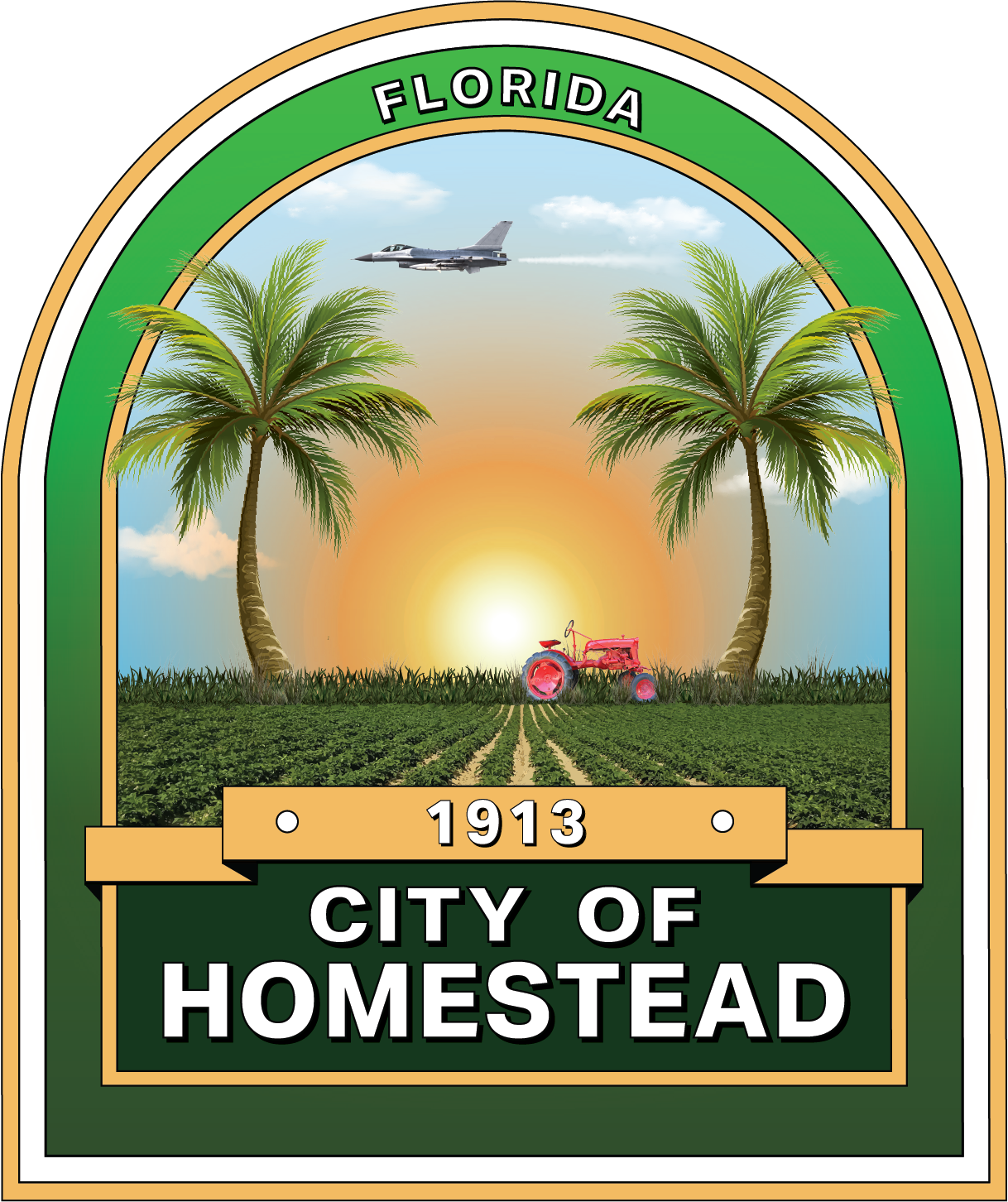
- Flag Seal
- Motto(s): "Gateway to Everglades & Biscayne National Parks" & "Discover the Opportunities"
- Interactive map of Homestead, Florida
- Location within Florida
- Coordinates: 25.4659°N 80.4460°W
- Country: United States
- State: Florida
- County: Miami-Dade
- Founded: 1904
- Incorporated (municipality): February 8, 1913
- Incorporated (city): 1923

Government
  - Type: Council–Manager
  - Mayor: Steven D. Losner
  - Vice Mayor: Jenifer N. Bailey
  - City manager: Dr. Nzeribe Ihekwaba
  - Councilmembers: Kimberly Konsky; Sean L. Fletcher; Larry Roth; Erica G. Ávila; Clemente Canabal

Area
  - City: 15.582 sq mi (40.357 km^{2})
  - Land: 15.084 sq mi (39.067 km^{2})
  - Water: 0.498 sq mi (1.290 km^{2}) 3.20%
- Elevation: 3.0 ft (0.9 m)

Population (2020)
  - City: 80,737
  - Estimate (2025): 86,242
  - Rank: US: 424th FL: 33rd
  - Density: 5,352.5/sq mi (2,066.6/km^{2})
  - Urban: 6,077,522 (US: 4th)
  - Metro: 6,391,072 (US: 8th)
  - Combined: 7,255,606 (US: 11th)
- Time zone: UTC–5 (Eastern (EST))
  - Summer (DST): UTC–4 (EDT)
- ZIP Codes: 33030–33035, 33039, 33090, 33092
- Area codes: 305, 786, and 645
- FIPS code: 12-32275
- GNIS feature ID: 2404723
- Highways: US 1, SR 997, SR 998
- Website: homesteadfl.gov

Homestead is a city within Miami-Dade County, Florida, United States. The population was 80,737 as of the 2020 census, and was estimated at 86,242 in 2025. It is a principal city of the Miami metropolitan area of South Florida, which was home to 6,138,333 people at the 2020 census, and was estimated at 6,391,072 in 2025.

Between Biscayne National Park to the east and Everglades National Park to the west. Homestead is primarily a Miami suburb and a major agricultural area. It is located approximately 26 miles (42 km) southwest of Miami, and 25 miles (40 km) northwest of Key Largo. The city of Homestead is located near the southern terminus of the Homestead Extension of Florida's Turnpike where it ends at its junction with U.S. 1. Homestead is immediately north and east of Florida City, and these two cities comprise the greater Homestead–Florida City area. Some of the notable unincorporated communities in the area are Redland, Leisure City, Naranja, and Princeton.

== History ==
In 1898, the Florida East Coast Railway (FEC) planned an extension from Miami to Key West, proposing a station 30 miles south of Miami. Henry Flagler, founder of the FEC, agreed and suggested naming the station "Ingraham" after James E. Ingraham who was the vice president and land commissioner for the FEC at the time. Ingraham declined and suggested naming it "Homestead" instead, even though no one had homesteaded in the area at the time. At this time homesteading was ongoing north and northwest of the proposed station in the area that is now known as Redland.

Before the Homestead station was built a railway surveyor named John S. Fredricks laid out a town site around the planned station site on land owned by the FEC. At the time, it was common to plan towns around rail stations in undeveloped areas.

In July 1904, the Florida East Coast Railway opened the first station in what would later become Homestead. In October 1904, a settler and entrepreneur named William D. Horne arrived to Homestead and was the first person to buy a lot at the new town site surrounding the railway. Shortly after his arrival, Mr. Horne constructed the first privately owned building in Homestead and used it as a store, rooming house and post office. Today that building still stands as the historic Redland Hotel.

Homestead was incorporated in 1913 and is the second oldest city in Miami-Dade County next to the city of Miami. The name originates from when the Florida East Coast Railway extension to Key West was being built. The rail line was passing through an area opened up for homesteading, and as the construction camp at the end of the line did not have a particular name, construction materials and supplies for the workers were consigned to "Homestead Country", shortened to "Homestead" by the engineers who mapped the area.

The 1926 hurricane and real estate downturn caused many small businesses and banks in Florida to fail. A lot of people left because their homes were destroyed or flooded, and most did not have insurance, facing hefty mortgage payments.

Homestead and neighboring South Miami-Dade County communities bore the brunt of Category 5 Hurricane Andrew on August 24, 1992.

In 2013, Homestead officially designated itself the gateway community for Biscayne and Everglades National Parks.

== Geography ==
According to the United States Census Bureau, the city has an area of 15.582 square miles (40.36 km^{2}), of which 15.084 square miles (39.07 km^{2}) is land and 0.498 square miles (1.29 km^{2}) (3.20%) is water.

Homestead is a small-sized city. At its greatest north–south points – along SW 137th Avenue (Speedway Boulevard) – its city limits extend only 4 miles (6 km) – from SW 288th Street (Biscayne Drive) at the north end to (theoretical) SW 352nd Street at the south end. At its greatest east–west points – along SW 328th Street (North Canal Drive / Lucy Street) – its city limits extend 6 miles (10 km) – from (theoretical) SW 132nd Avenue at the east end to SW 192nd Avenue at the west end. U.S. 1 – known as Homestead Boulevard within the city limits – extends through a rather narrow northeast / southwest corridor of the city from SW 304th Street (Kings Highway) at the north end to SW 328th Street (Lucy Street) at the south end. It is at this point at the south end that Homestead and Florida City share a common border. (North of the north end at SW 304th Street is known as Unincorporated Miami-Dade County, but it is locally known as the community of Leisure City).

Major east–west streets within Homestead include SW 304th Street / NE & NW 15th Street (Kings Highway), SW 312th Street / NE & NW 8th Street (Campbell Drive), SW 320th Street (Mowry Drive), SW 328th Street / SE & SW 8th Street (North Canal Drive / Lucy Street), and SW 344th Street / SE 24th Street (Palm Drive).

=== Climate ===
Homestead experiences a tropical monsoon climate (Köppen climate classification Am) that borders on a tropical savanna climate (Aw). Summers are hot and humid and high temperatures average between 90° and 92 °F (32° to 33 °C). Winters are warm and dry. The all-time record high temperature is 102 °F (38.9 °C), on August 19, 2026. Lows in summer average between 70 °F (21.1 °C) and 75 °F (23.9 °C), with low temperatures in all times of year averaging 5 degrees cooler than coastal Miami, mainly because of its inland and rural location. In winter, the area sees cold fronts bring cold weather for short periods from November to March. The lowest temperature ever recorded is 26 °F (–3 °C), on December 13, 1934, which was recorded at Homestead Air Force Base, some 10 miles east of the town. High temperatures in winter average between 75 and 80 °F (24 and 27 °C), and lows average between 55 and 60 °F (13 and 16 °C). Summer is the season when most of the rain occurs. Homestead has a wet season lasting from mid-May to early October. The dry season sees some rain, with most of it coming with the passing of cold fronts. Snow flurries were reported to have been observed in the air at Homestead Air Force Base, on January 20, 1977, and marked the farthest south that snow flurries have ever been reported in the lower 48 United States.

Climate data for Homestead, Florida (Miami Homestead General Aviation Airport), 1991–2020 normals, extremes 1910–present (Note: Homestead Express Station 1910–1988, Homestead General Aviation Airport 1990–present)
Month	Jan	Feb	Mar	Apr	May	Jun	Jul	Aug	Sep	Oct	Nov	Dec	Year
Record high °F (°C)	89 (32)	92 (33)	93 (34)	97 (36)	100 (38)	100 (38)	100 (38)	102 (39)	98 (37)	99 (37)	92 (33)	90 (32)	102 (39)
Mean maximum °F (°C)	85.0 (29.4)	86.7 (30.4)	89.0 (31.7)	91.4 (33.0)	93.4 (34.1)	94.7 (34.8)	95.5 (35.3)	95.7 (35.4)	94.0 (34.4)	92.3 (33.5)	87.5 (30.8)	85.3 (29.6)	96.5 (35.8)
Mean daily maximum °F (°C)	77.5 (25.3)	79.5 (26.4)	81.8 (27.7)	85.5 (29.7)	88.4 (31.3)	90.8 (32.7)	92.0 (33.3)	92.1 (33.4)	91.0 (32.8)	87.5 (30.8)	82.5 (28.1)	79.2 (26.2)	85.6 (29.8)
Daily mean °F (°C)	66.4 (19.1)	68.0 (20.0)	70.4 (21.3)	74.3 (23.5)	78.2 (25.7)	81.7 (27.6)	82.9 (28.3)	83.2 (28.4)	82.4 (28.0)	78.9 (26.1)	73.0 (22.8)	69.0 (20.6)	75.7 (24.3)
Mean daily minimum °F (°C)	55.3 (12.9)	56.6 (13.7)	59.0 (15.0)	63.2 (17.3)	68.1 (20.1)	72.7 (22.6)	73.8 (23.2)	74.3 (23.5)	73.9 (23.3)	70.4 (21.3)	63.4 (17.4)	58.7 (14.8)	65.8 (18.8)
Mean minimum °F (°C)	39.6 (4.2)	42.7 (5.9)	46.5 (8.1)	52.1 (11.2)	60.9 (16.1)	69.0 (20.6)	70.7 (21.5)	71.3 (21.8)	70.5 (21.4)	60.5 (15.8)	51.4 (10.8)	45.0 (7.2)	37.4 (3.0)
Record low °F (°C)	27 (−3)	26 (−3)	26 (−3)	39 (4)	47 (8)	56 (13)	63 (17)	64 (18)	61 (16)	42 (6)	30 (−1)	26 (−3)	26 (−3)
Average precipitation inches (mm)	1.70 (43)	2.01 (51)	2.05 (52)	2.92 (74)	5.77 (147)	9.34 (237)	7.14 (181)	10.17 (258)	8.63 (219)	5.86 (149)	2.34 (59)	1.97 (50)	59.90 (1,521)
Average precipitation days (≥ 0.01 in)	7.1	6.6	5.9	6.2	11.4	18.1	17.2	18.8	18.5	12.4	8.0	8.7	138.9
Source 1: National Oceanic and Atmospheric Administration
Source 2: National Centers for Environmental Information

==== Hurricanes ====
In August 1992, the Category 5 Hurricane Andrew devastated the town, as well as nearby Homestead Air Force Base. Hurricane Katrina caused flooding in Homestead in August 2005. The following October, Hurricane Wilma damaged light poles, grandstands, garages, and sections of catch fence at the Homestead–Miami Speedway, a motor racetrack built in the years following Hurricane Andrew. After Hurricane Wilma, a Homestead man was killed in a tractor accident while clearing debris.

When Hurricane Irma struck Florida in September 2017, parts of Homestead lost electric power. South Dade Center, a low-income housing project for farmworkers, was flooded with rainwater. Residents were without electricity and waste collection for about a week without relief.

== Demographics ==
Historical population
Census	Pop.	Note	%±
1910	261		—
1920	1,307		400.8%
1930	2,319		77.4%
1940	3,154		36.0%
1950	4,573		45.0%
1960	9,152		100.1%
1970	13,674		49.4%
1980	20,668		51.1%
1990	26,866		30.0%
2000	31,909		18.8%
2010	60,512		89.6%
2020	80,737		33.4%
2025 (est.)	86,242		6.8%
U.S. Decennial Census; 2020 Census

According to realtor website Zillow, the average price of a home as of October 31, 2026, in Homestead was $435,290.

As of the 2025 American Community Survey, there were 28,464 estimated households in Homestead with an average of 3.01 persons per household. The city has a median household income of $61,345. Approximately 17.5% of the city's population lives at or below the poverty line. Homestead has an estimated 63.9% employment rate, with 28.5% of the population holding a bachelor's degree or higher and 83.7% holding a high school diploma. There were 30,591 housing units at an average density of 2,028.04 per square mile (783.03/km^{2}).

The median age in the city was 33.2 years.

Homestead, Florida – racial and ethnic composition Note: the US Census treats Hispanic/Latino as an ethnic category. This table excludes Latinos from the racial categories and assigns them to a separate category. Hispanics/Latinos may be of any race.
Race / ethnicity (NH = non-Hispanic)	Pop. 1980	Pop. 1990	Pop. 2000	Pop. 2010	Pop. 2020
White alone (NH)	11,923 (57.69%)	11,217 (41.75%)	7,295 (22.86%)	9,684 (16.00%)	8,768 (10.86%)
Black or African American alone (NH)	5,156 (24.95%)	5,899 (21.96%)	6,886 (21.58%)	11,132 (18.40%)	14,006 (17.35%)
Native American or Alaska Native alone (NH)	—	52 (0.19%)	75 (0.24%)	77 (0.13%)	65 (0.08%)
Asian alone (NH)	—	194 (0.72%)	234 (0.73%)	684 (1.13%)	877 (1.09%)
Pacific Islander alone (NH)	—	—	14 (0.04%)	64 (0.11%)	39 (0.05%)
Other race alone (NH)	274 (1.33%)	26 (0.10%)	44 (0.14%)	136 (0.22%)	495 (0.61%)
Mixed race or multiracial (NH)	—	—	824 (2.58%)	657 (1.09%)	1,436 (1.78%)
Hispanic or Latino (any race)	3,315 (16.04%)	9,478 (35.28%)	16,537 (51.83%)	38,078 (62.93%)	55,051 (68.19%)
Total	20,668 (100.00%)	26,866 (100.00%)	31,909 (100.00%)	60,512 (100.00%)	80,737 (100.00%)

=== 2020 census ===
As of the 2020 census, there were 80,737 people, 24,952 households, and 19,324 families residing in the city. The population density was 5,352.49 inhabitants per square mile (2,066.61/km^{2}). There were 26,357 housing units at an average density of 1,747.35 per square mile (674.66/km^{2}). The racial makeup of the city was 29.47% White, 18.59% African American, 1.48% Native American, 1.17% Asian, 0.08% Pacific Islander, 16.94% from some other races and 32.28% from two or more races. Hispanic or Latino people of any race were 68.19% of the population.

=== 2010 census ===
As of the 2010 census, there were 60,512 people, 18,996 households, and 14,062 families residing in the city. The population density was 3,996.83 inhabitants per square mile (1,543.18/km^{2}). There were 23,419 housing units at an average density of 1,546.83 per square mile (597.23/km^{2}). The racial makeup of the city was 66.87% White, 20.35% African American, 0.40% Native American, 1.20% Asian, 0.12% Pacific Islander, 7.29% from some other races and 3.75% from two or more races. Hispanic or Latino people of any race were 62.93% of the population.

=== 2000 census ===
As of the 2000 census, there were 31,909 people, 10,095 households, and 7,157 families residing in the city. The population density was 2,233.94 inhabitants per square mile (862.53/km^{2}). There were 11,162 housing units at an average density of 781.45 per square mile (301.72/km^{2}). The racial makeup of the city was 61.00% White, 22.55% African American, 0.50% Native American, 0.76% Asian, 0.08% Pacific Islander, 9.84% from some other races and 5.27% from two or more races. Hispanic or Latino people of any race were 51.83% of the population.

There were 10,095 households, out of which 42.7% had children under the age of 18 living with them, 40.0% were married couples living together, 22.4% had a female householder with no husband present, and 29.1% were non-families. 20.9% of all households were made up of individuals, and 6.9% had someone living alone who was 65 years of age or older. The average household size was 3.10 and the average family size was 3.54.

In the city, the population was spread out, with 33.2% under the age of 18, 12.8% from 18 to 24, 31.2% from 25 to 44, 15.0% from 45 to 64, and 7.8% who were 65 years of age or older. The median age was 27 years. For every 100 females, there were 107.1 males. For every 100 females age 18 and over, there were 108.2 males.

The median income for a household in the city was $26,775, and the median income for a family was $26,409. Males had a median income of $23,118 versus $20,261 for females. The per capita income for the city was $11,357. About 29.1% of families and 31.8% of the population were below the poverty line, including 43.9% of those under age 18 and 20.0% of those age 65 or over.

== Media ==
The city of Homestead is served by the Miami market for local radio and television. Homestead has its own newspaper, the South Dade News Leader, which has been serving the South Dade community since 1913. The News Leader is published on Fridays.

"Inside Homestead TV" is a television program where viewers can find out about all the happenings in Homestead. Each month, a news show is released offering Homestead residents updates on local events as well as other developments throughout the region. Also, the program has in-depth interviews with the local Mayor & Council and City Staff, special events coverage, and how-to videos.

These monthly news reports vary in topic every month. For instance, the March 2015 video describes the new City Hall, education and National Parks news.

== Government and infrastructure ==
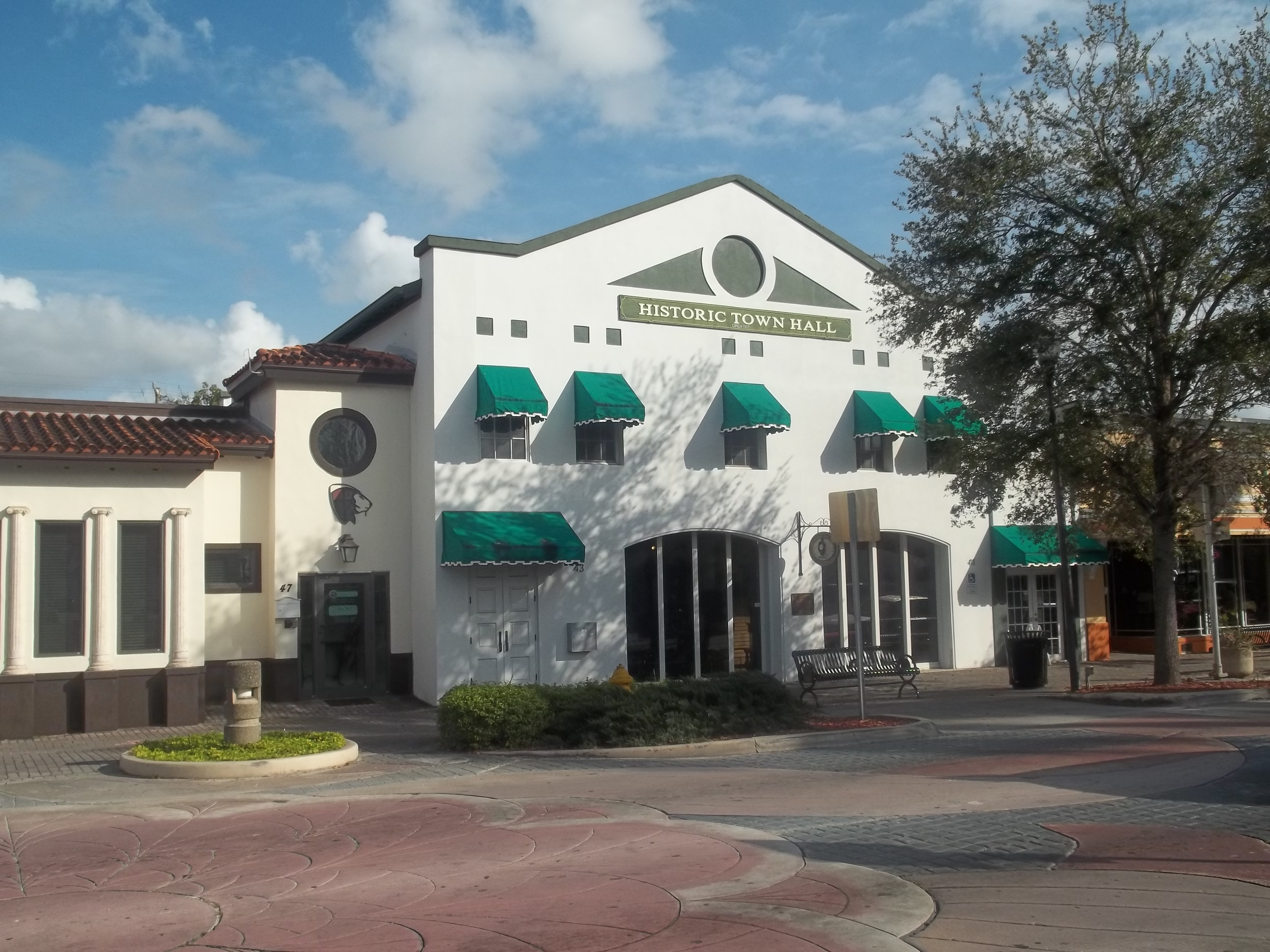
Homestead Town Hall

The Florida Department of Corrections operates the Dade Correctional Institution and the Homestead Correctional Institution in an unincorporated area near Homestead. The Dade CI was originally the Dade Correctional Institution Annex, and the Homestead CI was originally the Dade Correctional Institution; the two received their current names on June 30, 2026. In June 2018, Homestead Temporary Shelter for Unaccompanied Children, a federal facility operated by Comprehensive Health Services, Inc., was estimated to hold 1,000 minor detainees.

The United States Postal Service operates the Homestead Post Office.

The Homestead Police Department is located at 45 Northwest First Avenue.

On October 11, 1957, an Air Force B-47 Stratojet carrying a nuclear bomb crashed on takeoff at Homestead Air Force Base, present-day Homestead Air Reserve Base.

== Transportation ==
The principal roadways linking Homestead with the rest of Miami-Dade County are US 1, the Florida Turnpike and State Road 997. The Florida Turnpike has three exits (6, 5 and 2) as it runs south through eastern Homestead before eventually terminating at US 1 in Florida City. US 1 (Homestead Blvd.) runs northeast-to-southwest roughly through the middle of the city, and is the only way to continue to the Florida Keys. State Road 997 (Krome Ave.) runs north–south through the western end of Homestead and through the historic downtown district.

Miami-Dade Transit (MDT) runs several Metrobus routes connecting the Homestead/Florida City area to the rest of Miami-Dade County. Express routes run along the South Miami-Dade Busway, connecting the area with Metrorail and the rest of the Metrobus network and on to Tri-Rail, Amtrak and Miami International Airport. In addition, MDT operates Dade-Monroe Express service from Florida City to the Upper Keys.

The City of Homestead operates two local circulator lines. This free service operates daily and transits principal residential, business and commercial areas, as well as the historic downtown district and Miami-Dade College's Homestead Campus. The Trolley connects with Metrobus at the Busway and other Metrobus stops throughout the city.

Starting in 2014 the Homestead Trolley began seasonal service to Everglades National Park and Biscayne National Park. The free Homestead National Parks Trolley] is offered by the City of Homestead in partnership with the National Park Service. Operating on weekends between January and April, the service is the only public transportation option available to these two parks.

The Homestead General Aviation Airport is located just northwest of the city's central business district.

There are public marinas at Homestead Bayfront Park and Marina, on Biscayne Bay east of the city and adjacent to Biscayne National Park's Convoy Point Visitor Center, and at Black Point Park and Marina to the northeast. Convoy Point also has a limited number of marina slips for day visitors to dock.

Most major national car and truck rental companies have rental locations in Homestead or its immediate surroundings.

== Points of interest ==
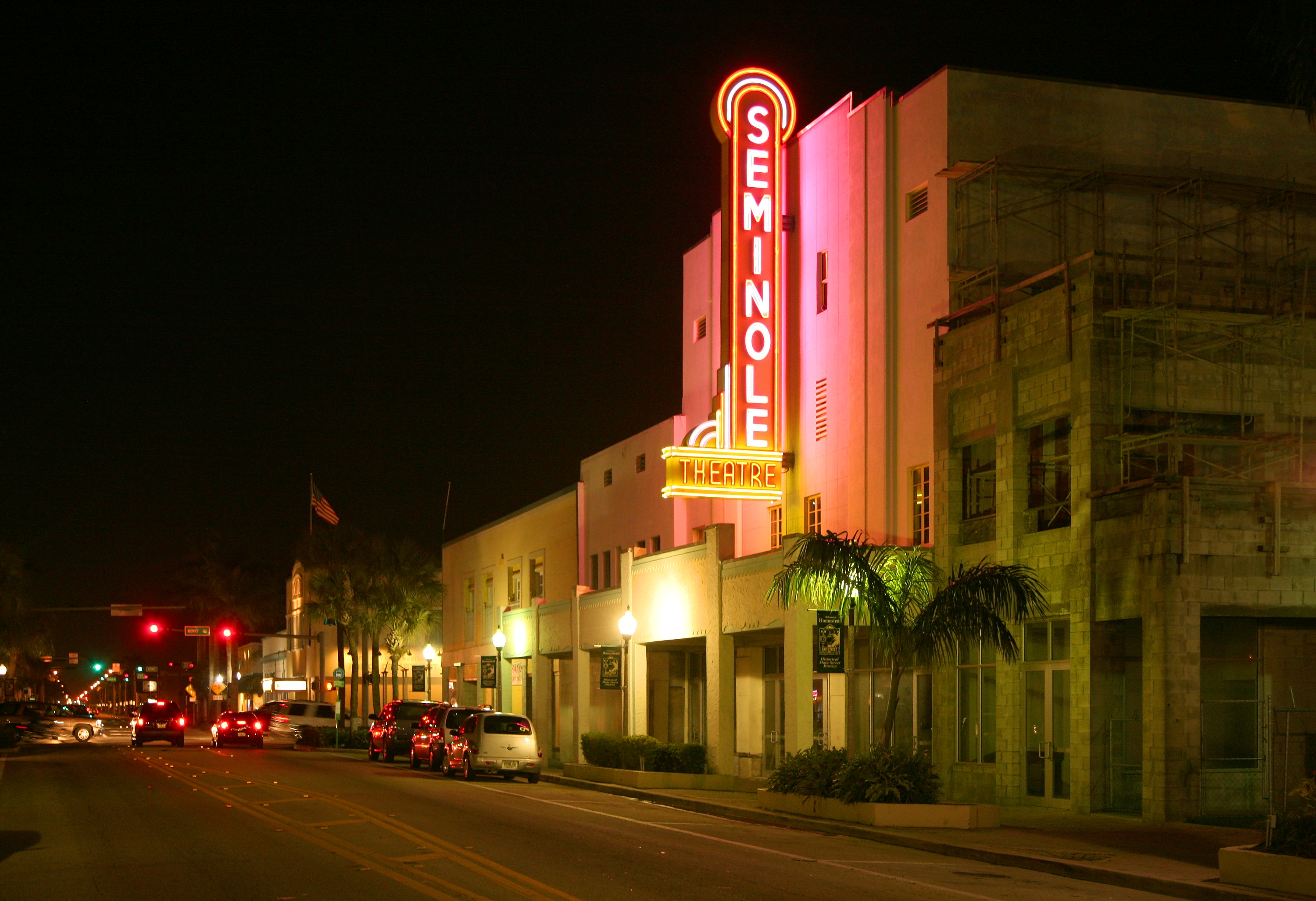
Seminole Theatre in downtown Homestead

The original Homestead Air Force Base was once located several miles to the northeast of Homestead, but due to annexation of formerly unincorporated land immediately to the east and northeast of the original city limits during the late-1990s, the city and the far southwestern perimeter of the (now) Homestead Air Reserve Base share a common border for a small portion along SW 137th Avenue (Speedway Boulevard).

A noteworthy tourist attraction within Leisure City is Coral Castle, built by a jilted lover, Edward Leedskalnin, over the course of 28 years from 1923 to 1951. Other places of interest include:

- ArtSouth Artist's Community
- Biscayne National Park
- Coral Castle
- Everglades Alligator Farm
- Everglades National Park
- Fruit and Spice Park
- Homestead Bayfront Park and Marina
- Homestead General Aviation Airport
- Homestead Historic Downtown District
- Homestead Seaboard Air Line Railway Station
- Homestead Pavilion
- Homestead Championship Rodeo
- Homestead–Miami Speedway
- Homestead Sports Complex
- Knaus Berry Farm
- Monkey Jungle
- Seminole Theatre
- South Dade Rail Trail
- Turkey Point Nuclear Generating Station

== Notable people ==
- John Brown, NFL wide receiver for the Buffalo Bills
- Alan Campbell, actor
- Tracy Grammer, singer-songwriter
- Ileana Ros-Lehtinen, politician and lobbyist who represented Florida's 27th congressional district from 1989 to 2019.
- Dexter Lehtinen, former United States Attorney for the Southern District of Florida
- Scott Maddox, former mayor of Tallahassee, Florida
- Alek Manoah, baseball player for the Toronto Blue Jays, 2019 MLB draft #11 overall selection
- Chrissy Metz, actress and singer
- Antrel Rolle, former NFL defensive line backer for the New York Giants
- Lacey Sturm, lead vocalist of rock band Flyleaf
- Tommy Tate, soul singer and songwriter
- Tom Vasel, podcaster, board game reviewer, and board game designer
- Brent Venables, University of Oklahoma head football coach
- Herb Waters, NFL cornerback for the Green Bay Packers
- James Wiggins, former NFL safety for the Arizona Cardinals
- Jeff Zucker, former president of CNN Worldwide, former president of NBC Universal

== Education ==
=== Public schools ===
Homestead is within the Miami-Dade County Public Schools district.

Homestead and the region are zoned to the following elementary, middle and K–8 center schools:

- Air Base K–8 Center
- Avocado Elementary School
- Campbell Drive K–8 Center
- Campbell Drive Middle School
- Coconut Palm K–8 Academy
- Gateway Environmental K–8 Learning Center
  - It opened with grades Kindergarten through 4 in 2009, making it the first district-operated public school established in Homestead in a period of more than 30 years. It would add an additional grade level per year until it had 8th grade. Its cafeteria is named Croc Café after its mascot, the crocodile. Each class does a different science project each year.
- Homestead Middle School
- Irving & Beatrice Peskoe K–8 Center
- Laura C. Saunders Elementary School
- Leisure City K–8 Center
- Mandarin Lakes K–8 Academy
- Miami MacArthur South
- Neva King Cooper Education
- Redland Elementary School
- Redland Middle School
- Redondo Elementary School
- School for Advanced Studies-Homestead
- South Dade Middle School (Grades 4–8)
- West Homestead Elementary School
- William A. Chapman Elementary School
- MAST (Medical Academy for Science and Technology) @ Homestead
- Somerset Academy South Homestead Middle - High
- Somerset City Arts Conservatory

Most of Homestead is zoned to Homestead High School, while a northwest portion is zoned to South Dade High School, located outside the city limits in unincorporated Miami-Dade County.

Homestead is zoned to South Dade Educational Center.

=== Charter schools ===
Homestead also has the following charter schools:

- Keys Gate Charter School
- Waterstone Charter School
- Advantage Academy of Math and Science at Waterstone
- Everglades Preparatory Academy
- ASPIRA South Youth Leadership Charter School
- Mavericks High of South Miami Dade County
- Somerset City Arts Conservatory
- Somerset Academy Charter Elementary School (South Homestead)
- Somerset Academy (Silver Palms)
- Somerset Oaks Academy
- Summerville Advantage Academy
- School for Integrated Academics and Technologies (SIATech)

=== Private schools ===
The Roman Catholic Archdiocese of Miami previously operated Sacred Heart School in Homestead. It closed in 2009.

=== Colleges and universities ===
Homestead is also home to Miami-Dade College Homestead Campus.

== Parks and recreation ==
- Angelo Mistretta Park
- Audubon Park
- Biscado Park
- Blakey Park
- Ernestine Jackson Seymour Park
- Harris Field Park
- Homestead Air Reserve Park
- James Archer Smith Park
- JD Redd Park
- Losner Park
- Mayor Roscoe Warren Municipal Park
- Musselwhite Park
- Palmland Park
- Phicol Williams Community Center
- Roby George Park
- William F. Dickinson Community Center
- Wittkop Park
