= 1995 College Baseball All-America Team =

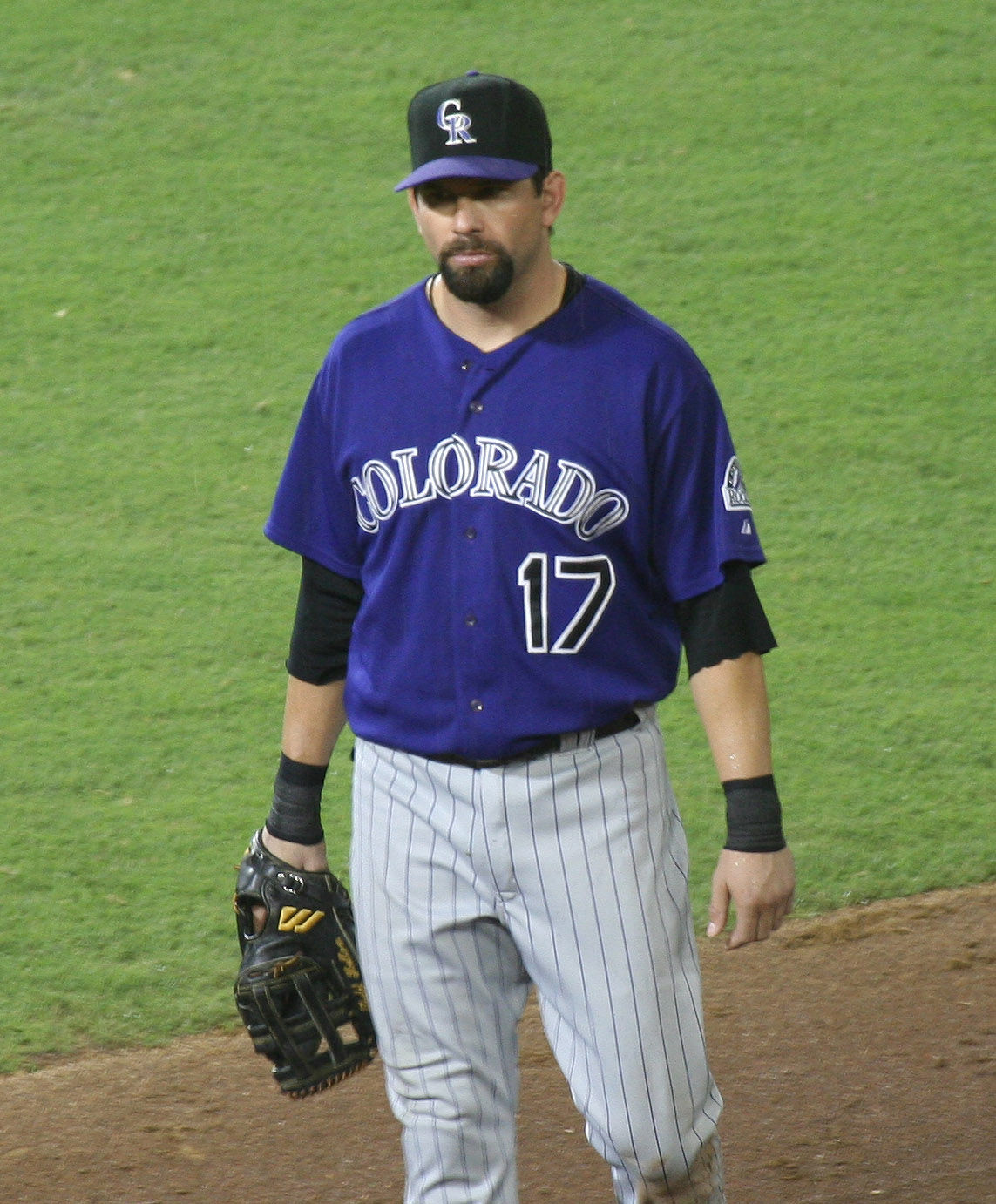
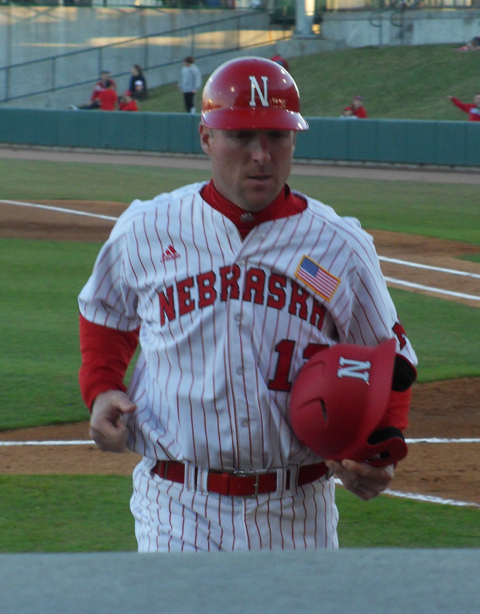
1995 All-Americans included five-time MLB All-Star Todd Helton (left) and current Nebraska Cornhuskers baseball head coach Darin Erstad (right).

This is a list of college baseball players named first team All-Americans for the 1995 NCAA Division I baseball season. From 1994 to 1996, there were four generally recognized All-America selectors for baseball: the American Baseball Coaches Association, Baseball America, Collegiate Baseball Newspaper, and the National Collegiate Baseball Writers Association. In order to be considered a "consensus" All-American, a player must have been selected by at least three of these.

== Key ==
A	American Baseball Coaches Association
B	Baseball America
C	Collegiate Baseball Newspaper
N	National Collegiate Baseball Writers Association – branded as the Smith Super Team
	Member of the National College Baseball Hall of Fame
	Consensus All-American – selected by all four organizations
	Consensus All-American – selected by three organizations

== All-Americans ==
Position	Name	School	#	A	B	C	N	Other awards and honors
Starting pitcher	R. A. Dickey	Tennessee	1	—	—	—	✓	
Starting pitcher	Ryan Halla	Auburn	2	✓	—	—	✓	
Starting pitcher	Jonathan Johnson	Florida State	2	—	✓	—	✓	
Starting pitcher	Matt Morris	Seton Hall	2	✓	✓	—	—	
Starting pitcher	Kyle Peterson	Stanford	1	—	✓	—	—	
Starting pitcher	Jamey Price	Ole Miss	2	—	—	✓	✓	
Starting pitcher	Mark Redman	Oklahoma	4	✓	✓	✓	✓	
Starting pitcher	Scott Schultz	LSU	1	—	—	—	✓	
Starting pitcher	Ted Silva	Cal State Fullerton	4	✓	✓	✓	✓	
Starting pitcher	Jay Tessmer	Miami (FL)	2	—	—	✓	✓	
Starting pitcher	Evan Thomas	FIU	2	—	—	✓	✓	
Starting pitcher	David Yocum	Florida State	1	—	—	—	✓	
Relief pitcher	Scott Winchester	Clemson	2	✓	—	✓	—	
Catcher	Javier Flores	Oklahoma	1	—	—	—	✓	
Catcher	Shane Gunderson	Minnesota	1	✓	—	—	—	
Catcher	A. J. Hinch	Stanford	3	—	✓	✓	✓	
First baseman	Sean Casey	Richmond	1	—	—	—	✓	
First baseman	Steve Hacker	Southwest Missouri State	3	✓	—	✓	✓	
Second baseman	Marlon Anderson	South Alabama	2	—	✓	—	✓	
Second baseman	Jason Totman	Texas Tech	3	✓	—	✓	✓	
Shortstop	Jason Adams	Wichita State	2	—	—	✓	✓	
Shortstop	Gabe Alvarez	USC	2	✓	—	—	✓	
Shortstop	Mark Bellhorn	Auburn	1	—	✓	—		
Shortstop	Peter Prodanov	Oklahoma State	1	—	—	—	✓	
Third baseman	Clint Bryant	Texas Tech	3	—	✓	✓	✓	
Third baseman	Toby Kominek	Central Michigan	1	✓	—	—	—	
Third baseman	Tal Light	Oklahoma State	1	—	—	—	✓	
Outfielder	José Cruz Jr.	Rice	3	✓	✓	—	✓	
Outfielder	David Dellucci	Ole Miss	1	—	—	—	✓	
Outfielder	Darin Erstad	Nebraska	4	✓	✓	✓	✓	First overall pick in the 1995 MLB draft
Outfielder	Geoff Jenkins	USC	3	—	✓	✓	✓	
Outfielder / DH	Mark Kotsay	Cal State Fullerton	4	✓	✓	✓	✓	Golden Spikes Award Collegiate Baseball Player of the Year Rotary Smith Award College World Series Most Outstanding Player
Outfielder	Shane Monahan	Clemson	2	—	—	✓	✓	
Outfielder	Mark Wulfert	New Mexico	1	✓	—	—	—	
Designated hitter	John Curl	Texas A&M	2	—	—	✓	✓	
Designated hitter	Todd Tatlock	Indiana State	1	✓	—	—	—	
Utility player	Todd Helton	Tennessee	4	✓	✓	✓	✓	Dick Howser Trophy ABCA Player of the Year Baseball America Player of the Year Collegiate Baseball Player of the Year
Utility player	Jeff Leaman	Indiana State	1	—	—	—	✓	
Utility player	Mark Quinn	Rice	1	—	—	—	✓	

== See also ==
- List of college baseball awards
