= 1995 Atlantic Coast Conference baseball tournament =

American college baseball tournament

- Teams: 9
- Format: Play-in round followed by eight-team double elimination
- Finals site: Greenville Municipal Stadium; Greenville, South Carolina
- Champions: Florida State (1st title)
- Winning coach: Mike Martin (1st title)
- MVP: Jonathan Johnson (Florida State)
- Attendance: 42,659

1995 Atlantic Coast Conference baseball standings
	Conf.				Overall
Team	W		L	PCT	W		L	PCT
No. 7 Clemson ‍†‍‍^{y}	20	–	4	.833	54	–	14	.794
No. 5 Florida State ‍‍‡‍^{y}	16	–	7	.696	53	–	16	.768
Georgia Tech ‍‍‍^{y}	16	–	8	.667	38	–	22	.633
No. 25 North Carolina ‍‍‍^{y}	14	–	10	.583	39	–	23	.629
Wake Forest ‍‍‍	13	–	11	.542	34	–	24	.586
NC State ‍‍‍	12	–	12	.500	36	–	24	.600
Virginia ‍‍‍	8	–	15	.348	26	–	29	.473
Duke ‍‍‍	4	–	20	.167	30	–	27	.526
Maryland ‍‍‍	4	–	20	.167	20	–	37	.351
† – Conference champion ‡ – Tournament champion y – Invited to the NCAA tournament As of June 30, 1995; Rankings from Collegiate Baseball

The 1995 Atlantic Coast Conference baseball tournament was held in Greenville, SC from May 16 through 21. Florida State won the tournament and earned the Atlantic Coast Conference's automatic bid to the 1995 NCAA Division I baseball tournament.

== Tournament ==
=== Play-in game ===
- The two teams with the worst records in regular season conference play faced each other in a single elimination situation to earn the 8th spot in the conference tournament.

Play-in game
9	Maryland	10
8	Duke	3

=== Main Bracket ===
==== Seeding Procedure ====
From TheACC.com:

On Saturday (The Semifinals) of the ACC Baseball Tournament, the match-up between the four remaining teams is determined by previous opponents. If teams have played previously in the tournament, every attempt will be made to avoid a repeat match-up between teams, regardless of seed. If it is impossible to avoid a match-up that already occurred, then the determination is based on avoiding the most recent, current tournament match-up, regardless of seed. If no match-ups have occurred, the team left in the winners bracket will play the lowest seeded team from the losers bracket.

==== Bracket ====
Upper round 1
9	Maryland	0
1	Clemson	10
5	Wake Forest	1
4	North Carolina	4
6	NC State	9
3	Georgia Tech	5
7	Virginia	0
2	Florida State	6

Upper round 2
4	North Carolina	4
1	Clemson	6
6	NC State	6
2	Florida State	12
Lower round 1
5	Wake Forest	17
9	Maryland	4
3	Georgia Tech	3
7	Virginia	2

Upper final
1	Clemson	11
2	Florida State	0
Lower round 2
6	NC State	11
5	Wake Forest	2
4	North Carolina	12
3	Georgia Tech	9

Semifinals
1	Clemson	16
6	NC State	7
2	Florida State	10
4	North Carolina	1

Final
2	Florida State	12	8
1	Clemson	2	2

- (*) Denotes 12 Innings

== All-Tournament Team ==
Position	Player	School
1B	Doug Mientkiewicz	Florida State
2B	Mickey Lopez	Florida State
3B	Paul Galloway	Clemson
SS	Mark Melto	Wake Forest
C	Josh Rowell	North Carolina
OF	Tony Ellison	NC State
OF	Gary Burnham	Clemson
OF	Jeremy Morris	Florida State
DH	Adam Faurot	Florida State
P	Jonathan Johnson	Florida State
P	Ken Vining	Clemson
MVP	Jonathan Johnson	Florida State

== See also ==
- College World Series
- NCAA Division I Baseball Championship
