= 1995 Big West Conference baseball tournament =

American college baseball tournament

- Teams: 4
- Format: Double-elimination tournament
- Finals site: Blair Field; Long Beach, CA
- Champions: Cal State Fullerton (1st title)
- Winning coach: Augie Garrido (1st title)

1995 Big West Conference baseball standings
	Conf.				Overall
Team	W		L	PCT	W		L	PCT
No. 1 Cal State Fullerton ‍†‍‡‍	18	–	3	.857	57	–	9	.864
No. 16 Long Beach State ‍‍‍	16	–	5	.762	38	–	25	.603
Nevada ‍‍‍	12	–	9	.571	35	–	18	.660
UNLV ‍‍‍	11	–	10	.524	32	–	21	.604
New Mexico State ‍‍‍	9	–	12	.429	32	–	22	.593
UC Santa Barbara ‍‍‍	8	–	13	.381	22	–	24	.478
Pacific ‍‍‍	5	–	16	.238	26	–	26	.500
San Jose State ‍‍‍	5	–	16	.238	21	–	33	.389
† – Conference champion ‡ – Tournament champion y – Invited to the 1995 NCAA Division I baseball tournament As of June 30, 1995; Rankings from Collegiate Baseball

The 1995 Big West Conference baseball tournament determined the conference champion for the Big West Conference at the end of the 1995 season. The four teams met in the double-elimination tournament from May 12 through 14 at Long Beach State's on campus facility, Blair Field. Cal State Fullerton won the tournament, earning the league's automatic bid to the 1995 NCAA Division I baseball tournament, en route to winning the College World Series for the third time.

This would be the second postseason conference championship event sponsored by the league, and the first with greater than two teams. The event would be held for the next four years before being discontinued.

== Seeding and format ==
The top four teams at the end of the conference's round robin regular season were seeded one through four based on conference winning percentage only.

Team	W	L	PCT	GB	Seed
Cal State Fullerton	18	3	.857	–	1
Long Beach State	16	5	.762	2	2
Nevada	12	9	.571	6	3
UNLV	11	10	.524	7	4
New Mexico State	9	12	.429	9	–
UC Santa Barbara	8	13	.381	10	–
Pacific	5	16	.238	14	–
San Jose State	5	16	.238	14	–

== Bracket ==
The following bracket depicts the results of the tournament.

Upper round 1
1	Cal State Fullerton	12
4	UNLV	1
2	Long Beach State	8
3	Nevada	13
Lower round 1
4	UNLV	3
2	Long Beach State	5

Upper final
1	Cal State Fullerton	6
3	Nevada	4
Lower final
3	Nevada	0
2	Long Beach State	2

Final
1	Cal State Fullerton
2	Long Beach State
