= 1995 Cal State Fullerton Titans baseball team =

American college baseball season

1995 CSUF Titans baseball

College World Series champions Big West Conference champions Big West Conference tournament Champions
- Conference: Big West Conference

Ranking
- Coaches: No. 1
- CB: No. 1
- Record: 57-9 (18–3 Big West)
- Head coach: Augie Garrido (20th year)
- Assistant coaches: George Horton (5th year); Rick Vanderhook (9th year); Mike Kirby (1st year)
- Home stadium: Titan Field

1995 Big West Conference baseball standings
| | Conf. | | | | Overall |
| Team | W | | L | PCT | W | | L | PCT |
|---|---|---|---|---|---|---|---|---|
| No. 1 Cal State Fullerton ‍†‍‡‍ | 18 | – | 3 | .857 | 57 | – | 9 | .864 |
| No. 16 Long Beach State ‍‍‍ | 16 | – | 5 | .762 | 38 | – | 25 | .603 |
| Nevada ‍‍‍ | 12 | – | 9 | .571 | 35 | – | 18 | .660 |
| UNLV ‍‍‍ | 11 | – | 10 | .524 | 32 | – | 21 | .604 |
| New Mexico State ‍‍‍ | 9 | – | 12 | .429 | 32 | – | 22 | .593 |
| UC Santa Barbara ‍‍‍ | 8 | – | 13 | .381 | 22 | – | 24 | .478 |
| Pacific ‍‍‍ | 5 | – | 16 | .238 | 26 | – | 26 | .500 |
| San Jose State ‍‍‍ | 5 | – | 16 | .238 | 21 | – | 33 | .389 |
† – Conference champion ‡ – Tournament champion y – Invited to the 1995 NCAA Division I baseball tournament As of June 30, 1995; Rankings from Collegiate Baseball

The 1995 Cal State Fullerton Titans baseball team represented California State University, Fullerton in the 1995 NCAA Division I baseball season. The Titans played their home games at Titan Field. The team was coached by Augie Garrido in his 20th season at Cal State Fullerton.

The Titans won the College World Series, defeating the USC Trojans in the championship series. Baseball America named them the best college team of the 20th century.

== Roster ==
1995 Cal State Fullerton Titans roster
| Pitchers: 10 Tom Dillon -Junior; 12 Ted Silva - Junior; 13 Jon Ward - Junior; 18 Todd Singelyn - Junior; 21 Mark Chavez - Junior; 27 Justin Alderson - Freshman; 32 Scott Hild - Freshman; 35 Tim Dixon - Senior; 37 Kimson Hollibaugh - Senior; 40 John Mitchell - Junior; 41 Danny Reeser - Junior; 42 Steve Cardona - Junior; 45 Mike Greenlee - Junior | Infielders: 2 Scott Drulias - Junior; 4 David Pruett - Junior; 5 Jack Jones - Sophomore; 6 Pedro J Rivera - Junior; 9 Ruben Hernandez - Senior; 11 Sergio Brown - Senior; 14 David Bridge - Junior; 15 Nakia Hill - Freshman; 17 Tony Martinez - Junior; 25 Mike Lamb - Junior; 34 D.C. Olsen - Senior; 45 Mike Brambilla - Freshman; Catchers: 19 Brian Loyd - Sophomore; 26 Mike Wright - Freshman; 38 Ryan Jara - Senior | Outfielders: 3 Steve Chatham - Freshman; 7 Mark Kotsay - Sophomore; 20 Robert Matos - Senior; 22 Skip Kiil - Junior; 23 C.J. Ankrum - Freshman; 24 Jeremy Giambi - Sophomore; 30 Ted Persell - Junior; 33 Tony Miranda - Senior; Coaches: 16 Augie Garrido - 20th Season; 8 George Horton - 8th Season; 28 Rick Vanderhook - 9th Season; 39 Mike Kirby - 1st Season |

== Schedule ==
1995 Cal State Fullerton Titans baseball game log
Regular season
January/February

| Date | Opponent | Score | Overall record | Big West record |
|---|---|---|---|---|
| January 31 | Cal Poly Pomona | 7-1 | 1-0 | – |
| February 3 | Stanford | 11-9 | 2-0 | – |
| February 4 | Stanford | 10-11 | 2-1 | – |
| February 5 | Stanford | 5-3 | 3-1 | – |
| February 7 | at UCLA | 6-2 | 4-1 | – |
| February 9 | at Arizona | 10-2 | 5-1 | – |
| February 10 | at Arizona | 10-2 | 6-1 | – |
| February 12 | at Arizona | 6-1 | 7-1 | – |
| February 15 | San Diego | 3-2 | 8-1 | – |
| February 17 | at Fresno State | 3-6 | 8-2 | – |
| February 18 | at Fresno State | 4-3 | 9-2 | – |
| February 19 | at Fresno State | 7-3 | 10-2 | – |
| February 21 | Southern California | 10-9 | 11-2 | – |
| February 24 | Pepperdine | 7-3 | 12-2 | – |
| February 25 | Notre Dame | 20-3 | 13-2 | – |
| February 26 | Texas | 14-6 | 14-2 | – |

March

| Date | Opponent | Score | Overall record | Big West record |
|---|---|---|---|---|
| March 1 | Cal State Northridge | 5-3 | 15–2 | – |
| March 3 | at Texas | 1-2 | 15-3 | – |
| March 4 | at Texas | 17-3 | 16-3 | – |
| March 5 | at Texas | 6-4 | 17-3 | – |
| March 8 | at Pepperdine | 6-3 | 18-3 | – |
| March 10 | Gonzaga | 8-6 | 19–3 | – |
| March 12 | Gonzaga | 7-2 | 20–3 | – |
| March 15 | at Loyola Marymount | 18-1 | 21–3 | – |
| March 18 | Cal Poly | 8-3 | 22–3 | – |
| March 19 | Cal Poly | 12-3 | 23–3 | – |
| March 20 | Cal Poly | 15-1 | 24–3 | – |
| March 24 | San Jose State | 11-1 | 25–3 | 1–0 |
| March 25 | San Jose State | 17-1 | 26–3 | 2–0 |
| March 26 | San Jose State | 3-6 | 26–4 | 2–1 |
| March 28 | Southern California | 4-7 | 26–5 | – |
| March 31 | at UC Santa Barbara | 9-6 | 27–5 | 3–1 |

April

| Date | Opponent | Score | Overall record | Big West record |
|---|---|---|---|---|
| April 1 | at UC Santa Barbara | 10-8 | 28–5 | 4–1 |
| April 2 | at UC Santa Barbara | 7-5 | 29–5 | 5–1 |
| April 5 | Loyola Marymount | 14-5 | 30–5 | – |
| April 7 | Long Beach State | 1-8 | 30–6 | 5–2 |
| April 8 | Long Beach State | 6-5 | 31–6 | 6–2 |
| April 9 | Long Beach State | 5-4 | 32–6 | 7–2 |
| April 13 | at UNLV | 8-7 | 33–6 | 8–2 |
| April 14 | at UNLV | 9-4 | 34–6 | 9–2 |
| April 15 | at UNLV | 18-4 | 35–6 | 10–2 |
| April 19 | Pepperdine | 6-5 | 36–6 | – |
| April 21 | Pacific | 2-1 | 37–6 | 11–2 |
| April 22 | Pacific | 9-5 | 38–6 | 12–2 |
| April 23 | Pacific | 5-0 | 39–6 | 13–2 |
| April 25 | Wichita State | 7-8 | 39–7 | – |
| April 26 | Wichita State | 3-4 | 39–8 | – |
| April 28 | at Nevada | 8-10 | 39–9 | 13–3 |
| April 29 | at Nevada | 5-4 | 40–9 | 14–3 |
| April 30 | at Nevada | 9-5 | 41–9 | 15–3 |

May

| Date | Opponent | Score | Overall record | Big West record |
|---|---|---|---|---|
| May 3 | at Cal State Northridge | 12-11 | 42–9 | – |
| May 5 | New Mexico State | 4-1 | 43–9 | 16–3 |
| May 6 | New Mexico State | 25-7 | 44–9 | 17–3 |
| May 7 | New Mexico State | 7-0 | 45–9 | 18–3 |
| May 9 | San Diego | 5-1 | 46–9 | – |

Postseason
Big West tournament

| Date | Opponent | Site/stadium | Score | Overall record |
|---|---|---|---|---|
| May 12 | vs. UNLV | Blair Field | 12-1 | 47–9 |
| May 13 | vs. Nevada | Blair Field | 6-4 | 48–9 |
| May 14 | vs. Long Beach State | Blair Field | 8-4 | 49–9 |

NCAA tournament: South Regional

| Date | Opponent | Site/stadium | Score | Cal State Fullerton Decision | Attendance | Overall record |
|---|---|---|---|---|---|---|
| May 25 | vs. Northeast Louisiana | Alex Box Stadium | 7–6 | Silva (W; 15–1) | 2,457 | 50–9 |
| May 26 | vs. James Madison | Alex Box Stadium | 9–1 | Ward (W; 9–3) | 1,814 | 51–9 |
| May 27 | vs. Rice | Alex Box Stadium | 9–1 | Silva (W; 16–1) | 1,414 | 52–9 |
| May 28 | vs. Rice | Alex Box Stadium | 8–7 | Chavez (W; 4–2) | 1,240 | 53–9 |

NCAA tournament: College World Series

| Date | Opponent | Site/stadium | Score | Cal State Fullerton Decision | Attendance | Overall record |
|---|---|---|---|---|---|---|
| June 3 | vs. Stanford | Rosenblatt Stadium | 6–5 | Silva (W; 17–1) | 15,643 | 54–9 |
| June 5 | vs. Tennessee | Rosenblatt Stadium | 11–1 | Ward (W; 10–3) | 8,000 | 55–9 |
| June 8 | vs. Tennessee | Rosenblatt Stadium | 11–0 | Dixon (W; 13–0) | 14,242 | 56–9 |
| June 8 | vs. Southern California | Rosenblatt Stadium | 11–5 | Silva (W; 18–1) | 22,027 | 57–9 |

== Awards and honors ==
C.J. Ankrum

- All-America Freshman

Mark Kotsay

- Golden Spikes Award
- Rotary Smith Award
- Collegiate Baseball Player of the Year
- College World Series Most Outstanding Player
- All-America First Team
- Big West Player of the Year
- All-Big West First Team

Jack Jones

- MVP, NCAA South Regionals Tournament

Brian Loyd

- All-America Third Team
- College World Series All-Tournament Team
- All-Big West First Team

Tony Martinez

- College World Series All-Tournament Team

Tony Miranda

- All-Big West First Team

Ted Silva

- All-America First Team
- College World Series All-Tournament Team
- Big West Pitcher of the Year
- All-Big West First Team

== Titans in the 1995 MLB draft ==
The following members of the Cal State Fullerton Titans baseball program were drafted in the 1995 Major League Baseball draft.

| Player | Position | Round | Overall | MLB team |
|---|---|---|---|---|
| Jon Ward | RHP | 8th | 211th | St. Louis Cardinals |
| Tim Dixon | LHP | 14th | 395th | Montreal Expos |
| D.C. Olsen | 1B | 15th | 423rd | Montreal Expos |
| Ted Silva | RHP | 21st | 570th | Texas Rangers |
| Tony Miranda | OF | 24th | 666th | Kansas City Royals |
| John Mitchell | RHP | 25th | 692nd | Toronto Blue Jays |
| Joe Fraser | 2B | 27th | 744th | Minnesota Twins |
| Brian Loyd | C | 39th | 1091st | Cincinnati Reds |
| Jeremy Giambi | OF | 44th | 1218th | Detroit Tigers |
