= 1995 ACC tournament =

1995 ACC tournament may refer to:

- 1995 ACC men's basketball tournament
- 1995 ACC women's basketball tournament
- 1995 ACC men's soccer tournament
- 1995 ACC women's soccer tournament
- 1995 Atlantic Coast Conference baseball tournament
- 1995 Atlantic Coast Conference softball tournament
