= 1995 Florida State Seminoles baseball team =

American college baseball season

1995 Florida State Seminoles baseball

ACC tournament champions NCAA Atlantic II Regional champions

College World Series, 1–2
- Conference: Atlantic Coast Conference
- Record: 53–22 (14–9 ACC)
- Head coach: Mike Martin (16th year)
- Home stadium: Dick Howser Stadium

1995 Atlantic Coast Conference baseball standings
	Conf.				Overall
Team	W		L	PCT	W		L	PCT
No. 7 Clemson ‍†‍‍^{y}	20	–	4	.833	54	–	14	.794
No. 5 Florida State ‍‍‡‍^{y}	16	–	7	.696	53	–	16	.768
Georgia Tech ‍‍‍^{y}	16	–	8	.667	38	–	22	.633
No. 25 North Carolina ‍‍‍^{y}	14	–	10	.583	39	–	23	.629
Wake Forest ‍‍‍	13	–	11	.542	34	–	24	.586
NC State ‍‍‍	12	–	12	.500	36	–	24	.600
Virginia ‍‍‍	8	–	15	.348	26	–	29	.473
Duke ‍‍‍	4	–	20	.167	30	–	27	.526
Maryland ‍‍‍	4	–	20	.167	20	–	37	.351
† – Conference champion ‡ – Tournament champion y – Invited to the NCAA tournament As of June 30, 1995; Rankings from Collegiate Baseball

The 1995 Florida State Seminoles baseball team represented Florida State University in the 1995 NCAA Division I baseball season. The Seminoles played their home games at Dick Howser Stadium, and played as part of the Atlantic Coast Conference. The team was coached by Mike Martin in his sixteenth season as head coach at Florida State.

The Seminoles reached the College World Series, their thirteenth appearance in Omaha, where they finished tied for fifth place after recording a win against Oklahoma and losses to Miami (FL) and Southern California.

== Personnel ==
=== Roster ===
1995 Florida State Seminoles roster
Pitchers: 6 - Phil Olson - Junior; 10 - Chris Chavez - Freshman; 13 - Jonathan Johnson - Junior; 16 - Thad Busby - (redshirt) Freshman; 17 - Chris Hitt - Junior; 21 - Randy Choate - Freshman; 22 - Charlie Cruz - Senior; 31 - David Yocum - Sophomore; 32 - Chuck Howell - Sophomore; 33 - John Truex - Freshman; 35 - Scooby Morgan - Junior; 44 - Mike Bell - Senior; 51 - Steve Butler - Sophomore	Catchers: 4 - Mike Martin Jr. - Senior; 12 - Jeremy Salazar - Freshman; 17 -Michael Cothran- ‘‘Freshman ’’; Infielders: 1 - Adam Faurot - Sophomore; 2 - Mickey Lopez - Junior; 7 - Brooks Badeaux - Freshman; 9 - Scott Zech - Sophomore; 15 - Matt Woodward - Freshman; 6 - John DeSalvo - Freshman; 25 - Doug Mientkiewicz - Junior	Outfielders: 14 - Randy Hodges - Senior; 24 - Josh Adeeb - Freshman; 27 - Steve Nedeau - Junior; 28 - Dean Vinson - Freshman; 29 - Bryan Senior - Freshman; 37 - Jeremy Morris - Sophomore; 39 - J. D. Drew - Freshman

=== Coaches ===
1995 Florida State Seminoles baseball coaching staff
- Mike Martin - Head coach - 16th year

== Schedule and results ==
Legend
Florida State win
Florida State loss

1995 Florida State Seminoles baseball game log
Regular season

February
Date	Opponent	Site/stadium	Score	Overall record	ACC record
Feb 3	Florida Atlantic*	Dick Howser Stadium • Tallahassee, FL	W 21–4	1–0	
Feb 4	Florida Atlantic*	Dick Howser Stadium • Tallahassee, FL	W 11–7	2–0	
Feb 5	Florida Atlantic*	Dick Howser Stadium • Tallahassee, FL	W 8–4	3–0	
Feb 10	at Arizona State*	Packard Stadium • Tempe, AZ	W 11–2	4–0	
Feb 11	at Arizona State*	Packard Stadium • Tempe, AZ	W 14–6	5–0	
Feb 12	at Arizona State*	Packard Stadium • Tempe, AZ	L 2–8	5–1	
Feb 17	Coastal Carolina*	Dick Howser Stadium • Tallahassee, FL	W 10–2	6–1	
Feb 19	Coastal Carolina*	Dick Howser Stadium • Tallahassee, FL	W 6–0	7–1	
Feb 21	Winthrop*	Dick Howser Stadium • Tallahassee, FL	L 1–2	7–2	
Feb 22	Winthrop*	Dick Howser Stadium • Tallahassee, FL	W 6–0	8–2	
Feb 24	Wake Forest	Dick Howser Stadium • Tallahassee, FL	W 4–0	9–2	1–0
Feb 25	Wake Forest	Dick Howser Stadium • Tallahassee, FL	L 3–4	9–3	1–1
Feb 26	Wake Forest	Dick Howser Stadium • Tallahassee, FL	W 10–1	10–3	2–1

March
Date	Opponent	Site/stadium	Score	Overall record	ACC record
Mar 3	vs LSU*	Hubert H. Humphrey Metrodome • Minneapolis, MN	L 2–6	10–4	
Mar 4	at Minnesota*	Hubert H. Humphrey Metrodome • Minneapolis, MN	W 4–1^{10}	11–4	
Mar 5	vs Michigan*	Hubert H. Humphrey Metrodome • Minneapolis, MN	W 17–6	12–4	
Mar 9	Florida*	Dick Howser Stadium • Tallahassee, FL	W 6–3	13–4	
Mar 10	Florida*	Dick Howser Stadium • Tallahassee, FL	W 2–1	14–4	
Mar 11	at Florida*	Alfred A. McKethan Stadium • Gainesville, FL	W 7–0	15–4	
Mar 12	at Florida*	Alfred A. McKethan Stadium • Gainesville, FL	L 3–9	15–5	
Mar 13	Virginia	Dick Howser Stadium • Tallahassee, FL	W 12–7	16–5	3–1
Mar 14	Virginia	Dick Howser Stadium • Tallahassee, FL	L 1–2	16–6	3–2
Mar 17	Michigan*	Dick Howser Stadium • Tallahassee, FL	W 4–3	17–6	
Mar 18	Michigan*	Dick Howser Stadium • Tallahassee, FL	W 14–4	18–6	
Mar 19	Michigan*	Dick Howser Stadium • Tallahassee, FL	W 11–2	19–6	
Mar 21	Mercer*	Dick Howser Stadium • Tallahassee, FL	W 17–1	20–6	
Mar 22	Mercer*	Dick Howser Stadium • Tallahassee, FL	W 22–7	21–6	
Mar 24	at Duke	Jack Coombs Field • Durham, NC	L 5–14	21–7	3–3
Mar 25	at Duke	Jack Coombs Field • Durham, NC	W 9–5	22–7	4–3
Mar 26	at Duke	Jack Coombs Field • Durham, NC	W 6–2	23–7	5–3
Mar 28	College of Charleston*	Dick Howser Stadium • Tallahassee, FL	W 11–1	24–7	
Mar 29	College of Charleston*	Dick Howser Stadium • Tallahassee, FL	W 12–1	25–7	
Mar 31	at NC State	Doak Field • Raleigh, NC	W 6–0	26–7	6–3

April
Date	Opponent	Site/stadium	Score	Overall record	ACC record
Apr 1	at NC State	Doak Field • Raleigh, NC	W 6–5	27–7	7–3
Apr 2	at NC State	Doak Field • Raleigh, NC	W 12–3	28–7	8–3
Apr 5	Jacksonville*	Dick Howser Stadium • Tallahassee, FL	W 11–1	29–7	
Apr 7	Miami (FL)*	Dick Howser Stadium • Tallahassee, FL	W 9–1	30–7	
Apr 8	Miami (FL)*	Dick Howser Stadium • Tallahassee, FL	L 5–6	30–8	
Apr 9	Miami (FL)*	Dick Howser Stadium • Tallahassee, FL	W 3–2^{11}	31–8	
Apr 14	at Miami (FL)*	Mark Light Field • Coral Gables, FL	W 9–6^{14}	32–8	
Apr 15	at Miami (FL)*	Mark Light Field • Coral Gables, FL	W 10–1^{12}	33–8	
Apr 16	at Miami (FL)*	Mark Light Field • Coral Gables, FL	L 2–3	33–9	
Apr 19	at Jacksonville*	John Sessions Stadium • Jacksonville, FL	W 6–3	34–9	
Apr 21	Clemson	Dick Howser Stadium • Tallahassee, FL	W 5–2	35–9	9–3
Apr 22	Clemson	Dick Howser Stadium • Tallahassee, FL	W 7–2	36–9	10–3
Apr 23	Clemson	Dick Howser Stadium • Tallahassee, FL	W 9–8	37–9	11–3
Apr 29	at Maryland	Shipley Field • College Park, MD	W 9–1	38–9	12–3

May
Date	Opponent	Site/stadium	Score	Overall record	ACC record
May 1	at Maryland	Shipley Field • College Park, MD	W 7–1^{10}	39–9	13–3
May 1	at Maryland	Shipley Field • College Park, MD	W 7–1^{10}	40–9	14–3
May 3	at Mercer*	Claude Smith Field • Macon, GA	W 18–3	41–9	
May 5	at Georgia Tech	Russ Chandler Stadium • Atlanta, GA	L 4–5	41–10	14–4
May 6	at Georgia Tech	Russ Chandler Stadium • Atlanta, GA	L 9–11	41–11	14–5
May 7	at Georgia Tech	Russ Chandler Stadium • Atlanta, GA	W 14–9	42–11	15–5
May 13	North Carolina	Dick Howser Stadium • Tallahassee, FL	L 2–3	42–12	15–6
May 14	North Carolina	Dick Howser Stadium • Tallahassee, FL	W 13–1	43–12	16–6
May 15	North Carolina	Dick Howser Stadium • Tallahassee, FL	L 3–5	43–13	16–7

Postseason

ACC Tournament
Date	Opponent	Seed	Site/stadium	Score	Overall record	ACCT Record
May 17	(7) Virginia	(2)	Greenville Municipal Stadium • Greenville, SC	W 6–0	44–13	1–0
May 18	(6) NC State	(2)	Greenville Municipal Stadium • Greenville, SC	W 12–6	45–13	2–0
May 19	(1) Clemson	(2)	Greenville Municipal Stadium • Greenville, SC	L 0–11	45–14	2–1
May 20	(4) North Carolina	(2)	Greenville Municipal Stadium • Greenville, SC	W 10–1	46–14	3–1
May 20	(1) Clemson	(2)	Greenville Municipal Stadium • Greenville, SC	W 12–2	47–14	4–1
May 21	(1) Clemson	(2)	Greenville Municipal Stadium • Greenville, SC	W 8–2	48–14	5–1

NCAA Atlantic I Regional
Date	Opponent	Seed	Site/stadium	Score	Overall record	NCAAT record
May 26	(6) Troy	(1)	Dick Howser Stadium • Tallahassee, FL	W 18–2	49–14	1–0
May 27	(3) South Alabama	(1)	Dick Howser Stadium • Tallahassee, FL	W 7–2	50–14	2–0
May 28	(5) Old Dominion	(1)	Dick Howser Stadium • Tallahassee, FL	W 7–2	51–14	3–0
May 30	(2) Ole Miss	(1)	Dick Howser Stadium • Tallahassee, FL	W 13–1	52–14	4–0

College World Series
Date	Opponent	Seed	Site/stadium	Score	Overall record	CWS record
June 3	(7) Oklahoma	(2)	Johnny Rosenblatt Stadium • Omaha, NE	W 3–2	53–14	1–0
June 5	(3) Miami (FL)	(2)	Johnny Rosenblatt Stadium • Omaha, NE	L 2–4	53–15	1–1
June 7	(6) Southern California	(2)	Johnny Rosenblatt Stadium • Omaha, NE	L 11–16	53–16	1–2
