= 1995 Oklahoma Sooners baseball team =

American college baseball season

1995 Oklahoma Sooners baseball

NCAA Midwest II Regional champions Big Eight Regular Season champions

College World Series, 0–2
- Conference: Big Eight Conference
- Record: 42–16 (21–7 Big Eight)
- Head coach: Larry Cochell (5th year)
- Home stadium: L. Dale Mitchell Baseball Park

1995 Big Eight Conference baseball standings
	Conf.				Overall
Team	W		L	PCT	W		L	PCT
No. 8 Oklahoma ‍†‍‍^{y}	21	–	7	.750	42	–	16	.724
No. 11 Oklahoma State ‍‍‡‍^{y}	18	–	10	.643	46	–	19	.708
Iowa State ‍‍‍	13	–	12	.520	28	–	24	.538
Kansas State ‍‍‍	13	–	14	.481	29	–	24	.547
Nebraska ‍‍‍	13	–	14	.481	35	–	23	.603
Kansas ‍‍‍	9	–	17	.346	24	–	33	.421
Missouri ‍‍‍	7	–	20	.259	19	–	34	.358
† – Conference champion ‡ – Tournament champion y – Invited to the NCAA tournament As of June 30, 1995; Rankings from Collegiate Baseball

The 1995 Oklahoma Sooners baseball team represented the University of Oklahoma in the 1995 NCAA Division I baseball season. The Sooners played their home games at L. Dale Mitchell Baseball Park, and played as part of the Big Eight Conference. The team was coached by Larry Cochell in his fifth season as head coach at Oklahoma.

The Sooners reached the College World Series, their ninth appearance in Omaha, where they finished tied for 7th place after losses to Florida State and eventual runner-up Southern California.

== Personnel ==
=== Roster ===
1995 Oklahoma Sooners roster
Pitchers: 8 - Brian Shackelford; 18 - Mark Redman; 23 - Russ Ortiz; 32 - Toby Wilmot; 33 - Tim Walton; 35 - Steve Connelly; 48 - Jeff Andra	Catchers: 4 - Javier Flores; Outfielders: 2 - Dustin Hansen; 9 - Bobby Brown; 11 - Aric Thomas; Infielders: 6 - Jesse Zepeda; 13 - Damon Minor; 16 - M. J. Mariani; 17 - Rich Hills; 26 - Tristan Paul; 30 - Ryan Minor	7 - Chris Bradshaw; 31 - David Galvin; 40 - Derek Gladsoe; 14 - Eric Linn; 10 - Mike Owens; 41 - Brett Pennington; 21 - Dax Powell; 42 - Shawn Snyder

=== Coaches ===
1995 Oklahoma Sooners baseball coaching staff
- - Larry Cochell - Head coach - 5th Season
- - Sunny Golloway - Assistant coach - 4th season

== Schedule and results ==
Legend
Oklahoma win
Oklahoma loss

1995 Oklahoma Sooners baseball game log
Regular season

February
Date	Opponent	Site/Stadium	Score	Overall Record	Big 8 Record
Feb 4	Missouri Southern*	L. Dale Mitchell Baseball Park • Norman, OK	W 12–4	1–0	
Feb 18	Oklahoma City*	L. Dale Mitchell Baseball Park • Norman, OK	W 8–7	2–0	
Feb 19	Oklahoma City*	L. Dale Mitchell Baseball Park • Norman, OK	W 15–3	3–0	
Feb 21	at TCU*	TCU Diamond • Fort Worth, TX	W 8–4	4–0	
Feb 23	Emporia State*	L. Dale Mitchell Baseball Park • Norman, OK	W 8–1	5–0	
Feb 25	at Texas Tech*	Dan Law Field • Lubbock, TX	L 4–5	5–1	
Feb 26	at Texas Tech*	Dan Law Field • Lubbock, TX	W 16–4	6–1	

March
Date	Opponent	Site/Stadium	Score	Overall Record	Big 8 Record
Mar 5	at Ole Miss*	Swayze Field • Oxford, MS	W 6–5	7–1	
Mar 8	Nebraska	L. Dale Mitchell Baseball Park • Norman, OK	W 3–2	8–1	1–0
Mar 8	Nebraska	L. Dale Mitchell Baseball Park • Norman, OK	W 7–5	9–1	2–0
Mar 9	Evansville*	L. Dale Mitchell Baseball Park • Norman, OK	W 14–13	10–1	
Mar 11	at Texas*	Disch–Falk Field • Austin, TX	L 2–4	10–2	
Mar 12	at Texas*	Disch–Falk Field • Austin, TX	L 1–3	10–3	
Mar 14	at Arizona State*	Packard Stadium • Tempe, AZ	L 2–6	10–4	
Mar 15	at Arizona State*	Packard Stadium • Tempe, AZ	L 2–8	10–5	
Mar 17	Iowa State	L. Dale Mitchell Baseball Park • Norman, OK	W 9–7	11–5	3–0
Mar 18	Iowa State	L. Dale Mitchell Baseball Park • Norman, OK	W 11–1	12–5	4–0
Mar 19	Iowa State	L. Dale Mitchell Baseball Park • Norman, OK	L 8–9	12–6	4–1
Mar 22	Missouri	L. Dale Mitchell Baseball Park • Norman, OK	W 8–7	13–6	5–1
Mar 22	Missouri	L. Dale Mitchell Baseball Park • Norman, OK	W 15–3	14–6	6–1
Mar 24	Kansas	L. Dale Mitchell Baseball Park • Norman, OK	W 12–1	15–6	7–1
Mar 26	Kansas	L. Dale Mitchell Baseball Park • Norman, OK	L 5–7	15–7	7–2
Mar 26	Kansas	L. Dale Mitchell Baseball Park • Norman, OK	W 21–8	16–7	8–2
Mar 28	at Kansas	Quigley Field • Lawrence, KS	L 5–6	16–8	8–3
Mar 29	at Kansas	Quigley Field • Lawrence, KS	W 7–1	17–8	9–3
Mar 31	Baylor*	L. Dale Mitchell Baseball Park • Norman, OK	W 5–3	18–8	

April
Date	Opponent	Site/Stadium	Score	Overall Record	Big 8 Record
Apr 1	Baylor*	L. Dale Mitchell Baseball Park • Norman, OK	W 8–3	19–8	
Apr 2	Baylor*	L. Dale Mitchell Baseball Park • Norman, OK	W 23–0	20–8	
Apr 4	at Kansas State	KSU Baseball Stadium • Manhattan, KS	L 1–7	20–9	9–4
Apr 5	at Kansas State	KSU Baseball Stadium • Manhattan, KS	L 9–14	20–10	9–5
Apr 7	Kansas State	L. Dale Mitchell Baseball Park • Norman, OK	W 6–1	21–10	10–5
Apr 8	Kansas State	L. Dale Mitchell Baseball Park • Norman, OK	W 10–7	22–10	11–5
Apr 9	Kansas State	L. Dale Mitchell Baseball Park • Norman, OK	W 7–3	23–10	12–5
Apr 14	at Missouri	Simmons Field • Columbia, MO	W 8–0	24–10	13–5
Apr 15	at Missouri	Simmons Field • Columbia, MO	W 13–7	25–10	14–5
Apr 16	at Missouri	Simmons Field • Columbia, MO	W 5–1	26–10	15–5
Apr 18	at Oral Roberts*	J. L. Johnson Stadium • Tulsa, OK	W 9–3	27–10	
Apr 19	Missouri Southern*	L. Dale Mitchell Baseball Park • Norman, OK	W 1–0	28–10	
Apr 21	Houston*	L. Dale Mitchell Baseball Park • Norman, OK	W 4–3	29–10	
Apr 25	Oklahoma State	L. Dale Mitchell Baseball Park • Norman, OK	W 5–4	30–10	16–5
Apr 26	at Oklahoma State	Allie P. Reynolds Stadium • Stillwater, OK	L 8–12	30–11	16–6
Apr 28	vs Oklahoma State	Drillers Stadium • Tulsa, OK	W 7–6	31–11	17–6
Apr 29	vs Oklahoma State	All Sports Stadium • Oklahoma City, OK	W 4–1	32–11	18–6
Apr 30	vs Oklahoma State	All Sports Stadium • Oklahoma City, OK	W 12–4	33–11	19–6

May
Date	Opponent	Site/Stadium	Score	Overall Record	Big 8 Record
May 2	TCU*	L. Dale Mitchell Baseball Park • Norman, OK	W 4–1	34–11	
May 3	TCU*	L. Dale Mitchell Baseball Park • Norman, OK	W 11–4	35–11	
May 4	Texas*	L. Dale Mitchell Baseball Park • Norman, OK	W 3–2	36–11	
May 13	at Nebraska	Buck Beltzer Stadium • Lincoln, NE	L 8–9	36–12	19–7
May 14	at Nebraska	Buck Beltzer Stadium • Lincoln, NE	W 11–9	37–12	20–7
May 15	at Nebraska	Buck Beltzer Stadium • Lincoln, NE	W 12–10	38–12	21–7

Postseason

Big Eight Tournament
Date	Opponent	Seed	Site/Stadium	Score	Overall Record	Big 8T Record
May 18	(6) Kansas	(1)	All Sports Stadium • Oklahoma City, OK	L 1–2	38–13	0–1
May 19	(2) Oklahoma State	(1)	All Sports Stadium • Oklahoma City, OK	L 7–9	38–14	0–2

NCAA Midwest Regional
Date	Opponent	Seed	Site/Stadium	Score	Overall Record	Reg Record
May 21	(5) Indiana State	(2)	All Sports Stadium • Oklahoma City, OK	W 9–6	39–14	1–0
May 22	(3) Texas	(2)	All Sports Stadium • Oklahoma City, OK	W 13–9	40–14	2–0
May 23	(1) Auburn	(2)	All Sports Stadium • Oklahoma City, OK	W 9–8	41–14	3–0
May 23	(1) Auburn	(2)	All Sports Stadium • Oklahoma City, OK	W 3–1	42–14	4–0

College World Series
Date	Opponent	Seed	Site/Stadium	Score	Overall Record	CWS Record
June 2	(2) Florida State	(7)	Johnny Rosenblatt Stadium • Omaha, NE	L 2–3	42–15	0–1
June 4	(6) Southern California	(7)	Johnny Rosenblatt Stadium • Omaha, NE	L 4–9	42–16	0–2
