= 1995 Miami Hurricanes baseball team =

American college baseball season

1995 Miami Hurricanes baseball

NCAA Atlantic II Regional champions

College World Series, 2–2
- Conference: Independent
- Record: 48–17
- Head coach: Jim Morris (2nd year)
- Home stadium: Mark Light Field

1995 NCAA Division I baseball independents standings
	Conf.				Overall
Team	W		L	PCT	W		L	PCT
No. 3 Miami (FL) ‍‍‍^{y}		–		–	48	–	17	.738
Hawaii–Hilo ‍‍‍		–		–	21	–	26	.447
Oral Roberts ‍‍‍		–		–	21	–	34	.382
West Chester ‍‍‍		–		–	16	–	29	.356
Colgate ‍‍‍		–		–	6	–	16	.273
Southern Utah ‍‍‍		–		–	10	–	32	.238
y – Invited to the NCAA tournament As of June 30, 1995; Rankings from Collegiate Baseball

The 1995 Miami Hurricanes baseball team represented the University of Miami in the 1995 NCAA Division I baseball season. The Hurricanes played their home games at Mark Light Field. The team was coached by Jim Morris in his second season at Miami.

The Hurricanes reached the College World Series, where they finished tied for third after recording wins against Southern California and Florida State and a pair of semifinal losses to eventual runner-up Southern California.

== Personnel ==
=== Roster ===
1995 Miami Hurricanes roster
Pitchers: - Jason Adge; - J.D. Arteaga; - Kenny Henderson; - Jay Tessmer; - Allan Westfall; Catchers: - Jim Gargiulo; - Mike Lopez-Cao	Infielders: - Danny Buxbaum; - Alex Cora; - Rudy Gomez; Outfielders: - Ryan Grimmett; - Tris Moore; - Eddie Rivero; - Bruce Thompson; - Mike Torti	Unknown: - Ryan Brannan; - Adam Finnieston; - Rick Gama; - Dorian Gonzalez; - Ricky Gonzalez; - Chad Hoelker; - Eddie Hoff; - T.R. Marcinczyk; - Mark Mestre; - Sean Tackett

=== Coaches ===
1995 Miami Hurricanes baseball coaching staff
- Jim Morris – Head coach – 2nd year

== Schedule and results ==
Legend
Miami win
Miami loss

1995 Miami Hurricanes baseball game log
Regular season

February
Date	Opponent	Site/stadium	Score	Overall record
Feb 1	Florida Atlantic	Mark Light Field • Coral Gables, FL	W 5–2	1–0
Feb 4	at Florida	Alfred A. McKethan Stadium • Gainesville, FL	L 3–5	1–1
Feb 5	at Florida	Alfred A. McKethan Stadium • Gainesville, FL	W 10–2	2–1
Feb 10	vs North Carolina	Osceola County Stadium • Kissimmee, FL	W 12–1	3–1
Feb 11	vs UCF	Osceola County Stadium • Kissimmee, FL	W 6–0	4–1
Feb 11	vs Georgia	Osceola County Stadium • Kissimmee, FL	W 12–10	5–1
Feb 12	vs UCF	Osceola County Stadium • Kissimmee, FL	W 5–4	6–1
Feb 15	Florida Atlantic	Mark Light Field • Coral Gables, FL	W 10–1	7–1
Feb 17	Florida	Mark Light Field • Coral Gables, FL	W 5–4	8–1
Feb 18	Florida	Mark Light Field • Coral Gables, FL	L 2–4	8–2
Feb 21	FIU	Mark Light Field • Coral Gables, FL	W 7–4	9–2
Feb 25	at South Florida	Red McEwen Field • Tampa, FL	W 4–3	10–2
Feb 26	at South Florida	Red McEwen Field • Tampa, FL	W 4–3	11–2

March
Date	Opponent	Site/stadium	Score	Overall record
Mar 1	Florida Atlantic	Mark Light Field • Coral Gables, FL	W 16–6	12–2
Mar 3	Illinois	Mark Light Field • Coral Gables, FL	W 4–2	13–2
Mar 4	Illinois	Mark Light Field • Coral Gables, FL	W 16–0	14–2
Mar 5	Illinois	Mark Light Field • Coral Gables, FL	L 4–7	14–3
Mar 10	Rutgers	Mark Light Field • Coral Gables, FL	W 12–5	15–3
Mar 11	Rutgers	Mark Light Field • Coral Gables, FL	W 8–0	16–3
Mar 12	Rutgers	Mark Light Field • Coral Gables, FL	W 11–4	17–3
Mar 14	Southern Illinois	Mark Light Field • Coral Gables, FL	W 5–4	18–3
Mar 15	Southern Illinois	Mark Light Field • Coral Gables, FL	W 5–3	19–3
Mar 17	Maine	Mark Light Field • Coral Gables, FL	W 10–0	20–3
Mar 18	Maine	Mark Light Field • Coral Gables, FL	W 12–6	21–3
Mar 19	Maine	Mark Light Field • Coral Gables, FL	W 10–3	22–3
Mar 22	at Florida Atlantic	FAU Baseball Stadium • Boca Raton, FL	W 5–3	23–3
Mar 24	Notre Dame	Mark Light Field • Coral Gables, FL	W 9–4	24–3
Mar 25	Notre Dame	Mark Light Field • Coral Gables, FL	W 12–4	25–3
Mar 26	Notre Dame	Mark Light Field • Coral Gables, FL	L 2–5	25–4
Mar 29	Northeastern	Mark Light Field • Coral Gables, FL	W 11–4	26–4
Mar 31	Tampa	Mark Light Field • Coral Gables, FL	W 19–7	27–4

April
Date	Opponent	Site/stadium	Score	Overall record
Apr 1	Tampa	Mark Light Field • Coral Gables, FL	W 7–5	28–4
Apr 4	at FIU	Homestead Sports Complex • Homestead, FL	L 2–4	28–5
Apr 7	at Florida State	Dick Howser Stadium • Tallahassee, FL	L 1–9	28–6
Apr 8	at Florida State	Dick Howser Stadium • Tallahassee, FL	W 6–5	29–6
Apr 9	at Florida State	Dick Howser Stadium • Tallahassee, FL	L 2–3	29–7
Apr 14	Florida State	Mark Light Field • Coral Gables, FL	L 6–9	29–8
Apr 15	Florida State	Mark Light Field • Coral Gables, FL	L 1–10	29–9
Apr 16	Florida State	Mark Light Field • Coral Gables, FL	W 3–2	30–9
Apr 21	Stetson	Mark Light Field • Coral Gables, FL	L 3–10	30–10
Apr 22	Stetson	Mark Light Field • Coral Gables, FL	W 14–7	31–10
Apr 23	at Stetson	Conrad Park • DeLand, FL	L 2–3	31–11
Apr 26	UCF	Mark Light Field • Coral Gables, FL	W 20–4	32–11
Apr 27	UCF	Mark Light Field • Coral Gables, FL	L 5–11	32–12
Apr 29	Jacksonville	Mark Light Field • Coral Gables, FL	W 5–0	33–12
Apr 30	Jacksonville	Mark Light Field • Coral Gables, FL	W 12–4	34–12

May
Date	Opponent	Site/stadium	Score	Overall record
May 1	Jacksonville	Mark Light Field • Coral Gables, FL	W 7–4	35–12
May 5	Mercer	Mark Light Field • Coral Gables, FL	W 7–4	36–12
May 6	Mercer	Mark Light Field • Coral Gables, FL	W 11–5	37–12
May 7	Mercer	Mark Light Field • Coral Gables, FL	W 6–1	38–12
May 12	Clemson	Mark Light Field • Coral Gables, FL	W 7–6	39–12
May 13	Clemson	Mark Light Field • Coral Gables, FL	L 5–7	39–13
May 14	Clemson	Mark Light Field • Coral Gables, FL	W 8–4	40–13
May 18	at Long Beach State	Blair Field • Long Beach, CA	L 1–4	40–14
May 19	at Long Beach State	Blair Field • Long Beach, CA	W 6–4	41–14
May 20	at Long Beach State	Blair Field • Long Beach, CA	W 3–2	42–14

Postseason

NCAA Atlantic II Regional
Date	Opponent	Seed	Site/stadium	Score	Overall record	NCAAT record
May 26	(6) UMass	(1)	Mark Light Field • Coral Gables, FL	W 3–1	43–14	1–0
May 27	(4) South Florida	(1)	Mark Light Field • Coral Gables, FL	W 11–10	44–14	2–0
May 28	(3) North Carolina	(1)	Mark Light Field • Coral Gables, FL	W 8–4	45–14	3–0
May 29	(2) Texas A&M	(1)	Mark Light Field • Coral Gables, FL	L 0–4	45–15	3–1
May 29	(2) Texas A&M	(1)	Mark Light Field • Coral Gables, FL	W 5–2	46–15	4–1

College World Series
Date	Opponent	Seed	Site/stadium	Score	Overall record	CWS record
June 2	(6) Southern California	(3)	Johnny Rosenblatt Stadium • Omaha, NE	W 15–0	47–15	1–0
June 4	(2) Florida State	(3)	Johnny Rosenblatt Stadium • Omaha, NE	W 4–2	48–15	2–0
June 7	(6) Southern California	(3)	Johnny Rosenblatt Stadium • Omaha, NE	L 5–7	48–16	2–1
June 9	(6) Southern California	(3)	Johnny Rosenblatt Stadium • Omaha, NE	L 3–7	48–17	2–2
