= 1995 Stanford Cardinal baseball team =

American college baseball season

1995 Stanford Cardinal baseball

Midwest I Regional champions

College World Series, T-5th
- Conference: Pacific 10 Conference

Ranking
- Coaches: No. 3
- CB: No. 3
- Record: 40–25 (20–10 Pac-10)
- Head coach: Mark Marquess (19th season)
- Home stadium: Sunken Diamond

1995 Pacific-10 Conference baseball standings
	Conf.				Overall
Team	W		L	PCT	W		L	PCT
Northern
Washington State ^{x}‍‍‍	18	–	12	.600	20	–	30	.400
Washington ‍‍‍	16	–	14	.533	24	–	30	.444
Gonzaga ‍‍‍	15	–	15	.500	29	–	25	.537
Oregon State ‍‍‍	14	–	16	.467	25	–	24	.510
Portland ‍‍‍	14	–	16	.467	24	–	25	.490
Portland State ‍‍‍	13	–	17	.433	19	–	36	.345
Southern
No. 2 Southern California ^{x}‍‍‍^{y}	21	–	9	.700	49	–	21	.700
No. 6 Stanford ‍‍‍^{y}	20	–	10	.667	40	–	25	.615
No. 29 California ‍‍‍	18	–	12	.600	32	–	25	.561
Arizona State ‍‍‍	13	–	17	.433	34	–	21	.618
UCLA ‍‍‍	12	–	18	.400	29	–	28	.509
Arizona ‍‍‍	6	–	24	.200	20	–	35	.364
x – Division champion y – Invited to the NCAA tournament As of June 30, 1997; Rankings from Collegiate Baseball

The 1995 Stanford Cardinal baseball team represented Stanford University in the 1995 NCAA Division I baseball season. The Cardinal played their home games at Sunken Diamond. The team was coached by Mark Marquess in his 19th year at Stanford.

The Cardinal won the Midwest I Regional to advanced to the College World Series, where they were defeated by the Tennessee Volunteers.

== Roster ==
1995 Stanford Cardinal baseball team
Players
Coaches

#	Pos.	Name	B/T	Height	Weight	Year	Home town
	OF	Dusty Allen	R/R	6 ft 4 in (1.93 m)	215 lb (98 kg)	Sr	Edmond, Oklahoma
	RHP	Todd Bartel	R/R	6 ft 4 in (1.93 m)	215 lb (98 kg)	Jr	Omaha, Nebraska
	RHP	J. D. Brammer	R/R	6 ft 4 in (1.93 m)	235 lb (107 kg)	So	Logan, West Virginia
	OF	Cale Carter	L/R	5 ft 10 in (1.78 m)	185 lb (84 kg)	Jr	Santa Ana, California
	INF	Steve Carver	L/R	6 ft 3 in (1.91 m)	215 lb (98 kg)	Sr	Jacksonville, Florida
	OF	Chris Clark	R/R	5 ft 10 in (1.78 m)	180 lb (82 kg)	Fr	St. Petersburg, Florida
		Rich Crowe	/	—	—	Jr
	INF	Brian Dallimore	R/R	6 ft 1 in (1.85 m)	180 lb (82 kg)	Jr	Las Vegas, Nevada
		Chris Draft	/	—	—
	P	Eric Dreier	/	—	—
		Sean Flikke	/	—	—
	C	A. J. Hinch	R/R	6 ft 1 in (1.85 m)	195 lb (88 kg)	Jr	Midwest City, Oklahoma
	RHP	Mario Iglesias	S/R	6 ft 3 in (1.91 m)	195 lb (88 kg)	Jr	Hayward, California
	INF	Troy Kent	R/R	6 ft 1 in (1.85 m)	200 lb (91 kg)	Jr	Tampa, Florida
	INF	Joe Kilburg	L/R	5 ft 11 in (1.8 m)	180 lb (82 kg)	Fr	Cleveland, Ohio
		Bryan LaCour	/	—	—
		Doug Melsheimer	/	—	—
	RHP	Jason Middlebrook	R/R	6 ft 3 in (1.91 m)	215 lb (98 kg)		Grass Lake, Michigan
		Jimmy Noriega	/	—	—
	INF	Jay Pecci	S/R	5 ft 11 in (1.8 m)	192 lb (87 kg)		Redwood City, California
	RHP	Kyle Peterson	L/R	6 ft 3 in (1.91 m)	215 lb (98 kg)	Fr	Omaha, Nebraska
	LHP	Dan Reed	R/L	6 ft 4 in (1.93 m)	210 lb (95 kg)		Washington, D.C.
	RHP	Tom Reimers	R/R	6 ft 2 in (1.88 m)	185 lb (84 kg)		Orange, California
	LHP	Mike Robbins	L/L	6 ft 1 in (1.85 m)	190 lb (86 kg)		Oakland, California
	C	Jon Schaeffer	R/R	6 ft 1 in (1.85 m)	205 lb (93 kg)		Tarzana, California
	INF	Eric Sees	R/R	6 ft 2 in (1.88 m)	185 lb (84 kg)		Rancho Santa Margarita, California
	RHP	Brendan Sullivan	R/R	6 ft 3 in (1.91 m)	190 lb (86 kg)		Washington, D.C.
	OF	Brodie Van Wagenen	/	—	—		Encino, California
		Eric Wei	/	—	—
	P	Mark Williams	/	—	—

Head coach

Mark Marquess

Assistant coach(es)

Legend

- (C) Team captain
- (S) Suspended
- (I) Ineligible
- Injured
- Current redshirt

Roster
Last update: January 15, 2021

== Schedule ==
1995 Stanford Cardinal baseball game log
Regular season
January (2–0)

#	Date	Opponent	Site/stadium	Score	Overall record	Pac-10 record
1	January 28	Saint Mary's	Sunken Diamond • Stanford, California	6–0	1–0	–
2	January 30	Saint Mary's	Sunken Diamond • Stanford, California	5–4	2–0	–

February (9–8)

#	Date	Opponent	Site/stadium	Score	Overall record	Pac-10 record
3	February 3	at Cal State Fullerton	Titan Field • Fullerton, California	9–11	2–1	–
4	February 4	at Cal State Fullerton	Titan Field • Fullerton, California	11–10	3–1	–
5	February 5	at Cal State Fullerton	Titan Field • Fullerton, California	3–5	3–2	–
6	February 7	Sacramento State	Sunken Diamond • Stanford, California	7–4	4–2	–
7	February 10	Fresno State	Sunken Diamond • Stanford, California	2–3	4–3	–
8	February 11	Fresno State	Sunken Diamond • Stanford, California	0–6	4–4	–
9	February 12	Fresno State	Sunken Diamond • Stanford, California	4–2	5–4	–
10	February 13	Cal State Los Angeles	Sunken Diamond • Stanford, California	7–0	6–4	–
11	February 16	at UC Davis	Dobbins Stadium • Davis, California	7–0	7–4	–
12	February 18	Santa Clara	Sunken Diamond • Stanford, California	0–4	7–5	–
13	February 19	at Santa Clara	Stephen Schott Stadium • Santa Clara, California	3–5	7–6	–
14	February 20	Santa Clara	Sunken Diamond • Stanford, California	2–1	8–6	–
15	February 21	at San Francisco	Dante Benedetti Diamond at Max Ulrich Field • San Francisco, California	15–4	9–6	–
16	February 24	at UCLA	Jackie Robinson Stadium • Los Angeles, California	6–5	10–6	1–0
17	February 25	at UCLA	Jackie Robinson Stadium • Los Angeles, California	6–8	10–7	1–1
18	February 26	at UCLA	Jackie Robinson Stadium • Los Angeles, California	2–0	11–7	2–1
19	February 28	at Pacific	Sunken Diamond • Stanford, California	2–10	11–8	2–1

March (6–4)

#	Date	Opponent	Site/stadium	Score	Overall record	Pac-10 record
20	March 4	at California	Evans Diamond • Berkeley, California	7–0	12–8	3–1
21	March 6	California	Sunken Diamond • Stanford, California	4–6	12–9	3–2
22	March 7	Nevada	Sunken Diamond • Stanford, California	4–7	12–10	3–2
23	March 12	at Southern California	Dedeaux Field • Los Angeles, California	5–4	13–10	4–2
24	March 12	at Southern California	Dedeaux Field • Los Angeles, California	1–5	13–11	4–3
25	March 13	at Southern California	Dedeaux Field • Los Angeles, California	9–1	14–11	5–3
26	March 25	Arizona State	Sunken Diamond • Stanford, California	5–8	14–12	5–4
27	March 26	Arizona State	Sunken Diamond • Stanford, California	6–3	15–12	6–4
28	March 27	Arizona State	Sunken Diamond • Stanford, California	9–6	16–12	7–4
29	March 31	at Arizona	Jerry Kindall Field at Frank Sancet Stadium • Tucson, Arizona	12–8	17–12	8–4

April (10–8)

#	Date	Opponent	Site/stadium	Score	Overall record	Pac-10 record
30	April 1	at Arizona	Jerry Kindall Field at Frank Sancet Stadium • Tucson, Arizona	8–5	18–12	9–4
31	April 2	at Arizona	Jerry Kindall Field at Frank Sancet Stadium • Tucson, Arizona	18–3	19–12	10–4
32	April 4	San Jose State	Sunken Diamond • Stanford, California	4–9	19–13	10–4
33	April 8	UCLA	Sunken Diamond • Stanford, California	1–9	19–14	10–5
34	April 8	UCLA	Sunken Diamond • Stanford, California	7–4	20–14	11–5
35	April 9	UCLA	Sunken Diamond • Stanford, California	16–3	21–14	12–5
36	April 10	at Nevada	William Peccole Park • Reno, Nevada	25–6	22–14	12–5
37	April 13	Southern California	Sunken Diamond • Stanford, California	5–7	22–15	12–6
38	April 14	Southern California	Sunken Diamond • Stanford, California	4–6	22–16	12–7
39	April 15	Southern California	Sunken Diamond • Stanford, California	8–9	22–17	12–8
40	April 20	California	Sunken Diamond • Stanford, California	0–4	22–18	12–9
41	April 21	at California	Evans Diamond • Berkeley, California	6–3	23–18	13–9
42	April 22	California	Sunken Diamond • Stanford, California	7–0	24–18	14–9
43	April 23	at California	Evans Diamond • Berkeley, California	16–8	25–18	15–9
44	April 25	at San Jose State	San Jose Municipal Stadium • San Jose, California	3–6	25–19	15–9
45	April 28	Arizona	Sunken Diamond • Stanford, California	7–1	26–19	16–9
46	April 29	Arizona	Sunken Diamond • Stanford, California	6–8	26–20	16–10
47	April 30	Arizona	Sunken Diamond • Stanford, California	4–3	27–20	17–10

May (7–2)

#	Date	Opponent	Site/stadium	Score	Overall record	Pac-10 record
48	May 2	at Santa Clara	Stephen Schott Stadium • Santa Clara, California	8–6	28–20	17–10
49	May 8	at Sacramento State	John Smith Field • Sacramento, California	8–2	28–21	17–10
50	May 9	San Francisco	Sunken Diamond • Stanford, California	8–1	29–21	17–10
51	May 12	at Arizona State	Packard Stadium • Tempe, Arizona	8–4	30–21	18–10
52	May 13	at Arizona State	Packard Stadium • Tempe, Arizona	11–3	31–21	19–10
53	May 14	at Arizona State	Packard Stadium • Tempe, Arizona	10–7	32–21	20–10
54	May 19	UC Santa Barbara	Sunken Diamond • Stanford, California	6–3	33–21	20–10
55	May 20	UC Santa Barbara	Sunken Diamond • Stanford, California	3–2	34–21	20–10
56	May 21	UC Santa Barbara	Sunken Diamond • Stanford, California	6–8	34–22	20–10

Postseason
NCAA Midwest I Regional (5–1)

#	Date	Opponent	Site/stadium	Score	Overall record	Pac-10 record
57	May 27	vs Arkansas	Eck Stadium • Wichita, Kansas	10–3	35–22	20–10
58	May 28	vs Lamar	Eck Stadium • Wichita, Kansas	8–1	36–22	20–10
59	May 28	vs Texas Tech	Eck Stadium • Wichita, Kansas	1–3	36–23	20–10
60	May 29	Lamar	Eck Stadium • Wichita, Kansas	16–9	37–23	20–10
61	May 29	Texas Tech	Eck Stadium • Wichita, Kansas	3–2	38–23	20–10
62	May 30	Texas Tech	Eck Stadium • Wichita, Kansas	6–5	39–23	20–10

College World Series (1–2)

#	Date	Opponent	Site/stadium	Score	Overall record	Pac-10 record
63	June 3	vs Cal State Fullerton	Johnny Rosenblatt Stadium • Omaha, Nebraska	5–6	39–24	20–10
64	June 5	vs Clemson	Johnny Rosenblatt Stadium • Omaha, Nebraska	8–3	40–24	20–10
65	June 6	vs Tennessee	Johnny Rosenblatt Stadium • Omaha, Nebraska	2–6	40–25	20–10

== Awards and honors ==
Cale Carter

- All-Pac-10 South Division

Steve Carver

- All-Pac-10 South Division

A. J. Hinch

- Pac-10 Conference Southern Division Player of the Year
- First Team All-American Baseball America
- First Team All-American Collegiate Baseball

Joe Kilburg

- Honorable Mention Freshman All-American Collegiate Baseball

Kyle Peterson

- Pac-10 Conference Southern Division Pitcher of the Year
- First Team All-American Baseball America
- Third Team All-American Collegiate Baseball
- First Team Freshman All-American Baseball America
- First Team Freshman All-American Collegiate Baseball
- Freshman of the Year Baseball America
- Freshman of the Year Collegiate Baseball
