= 1995 NCAA Division I baseball rankings =

1995 NCAA Division I baseball season

Tournament

College World Series
- Champions: Cal State Fullerton
- Runners-up: Southern California
- MOP: Mark Kotsay (Cal State Fullerton)

Seasons
- ← 1994 1996 →

The following polls make up the 1995 NCAA Division I baseball rankings. USA Today and ESPN began publishing the Coaches' Poll of 31 active coaches ranking the top 25 teams in the nation in 1992. Each coach is a member of the American Baseball Coaches Association. Baseball America began publishing its poll of the top 20 teams in college baseball in 1981. Beginning with the 1985 season, it expanded to the top 25. Collegiate Baseball Newspaper published its first human poll of the top 20 teams in college baseball in 1957, and expanded to rank the top 30 teams in 1961.

== USA Today/ESPN Coaches' Poll ==
Currently, only the final poll from the 1995 season is available.

Rank	Team
1	Cal State Fullerton
2	Southern California
3	Miami (FL)
4	Florida State
5	Tennessee
6	Stanford
7	Clemson
8	Oklahoma
9	Texas Tech
10	Auburn
11	Oklahoma State
12	Rice
13	Texas A&M
14	LSU
15	Alabama
16	Wichita State
17	Long Beach State
18	Texas
19	Ole Miss
20	UCF
21	FIU
22	Pepperdine
23	Fresno State
24	North Carolina
25	South Alabama

== Baseball America ==
Currently, only the final poll from the 1995 season is available.

Rank	Team
1	Cal State Fullerton
2	Southern California
3	Florida State
4	Miami (FL)
5	Tennessee
6	Clemson
7	Oklahoma
8	Texas Tech
9	Auburn
10	Stanford
11	Oklahoma State
12	Rice
13	Wichita State
14	Alabama
15	LSU
16	Texas A&M
17	Long Beach State
18	Ole Miss
19	UCF
20	Pepperdine
21	Texas
22	FIU
23	Fresno State
24	Lamar
25	North Carolina

== Collegiate Baseball ==
Currently, only the final poll from the 1995 season is available.

Rank	Team
1	Cal State Fullerton
2	Southern California
3	Miami (FL)
4	Tennessee
5	Florida State
6	Stanford
7	Clemson
8	Oklahoma
9	Auburn
10	Texas Tech
11	Oklahoma State
12	Texas A&M
13	Wichita State
14	Alabama
15	Rice
16	Long Beach State
17	Ole Miss
18	LSU
19	Pepperdine
20	FIU
21	UCF
22	Fresno State
23	Texas
24	Winthrop
25	North Carolina
26	Ohio State
27	Lamar
28	Pittsburgh
29	California
30	Old Dominion
