= 1995 NCAA Division I baseball tournament =

- Season: 1995
- Teams: 48
- Finals site: Johnny Rosenblatt Stadium; Omaha, NE
- Champions: Cal State Fullerton (3rd title)
- Runner-up: Southern California (18th CWS Appearance)
- Winning coach: Augie Garrido (3rd title)
- MOP: Mark Kotsay (Cal State Fullerton)

The 1995 NCAA Division I baseball tournament was played at the end of the 1995 NCAA Division I baseball season to determine the national champion of college baseball. The tournament concluded with eight teams competing in the College World Series, a double-elimination tournament in its forty ninth year. Eight regional competitions were held to determine the participants in the final event. Each region was composed of six teams, resulting in 48 teams participating in the tournament at the conclusion of their regular season, and in some cases, after a conference tournament. The forty-ninth tournament's champion was Cal State Fullerton, coached by Augie Garrido. The Most Outstanding Player was Mark Kotsay of Cal State Fullerton.

== Regionals ==
The opening rounds of the tournament were played across eight regional sites across the country, each consisting of a six-team field. Each regional tournament is double-elimination. However, region brackets are variable depending on the number of teams remaining after each round. The winners of each regional advanced to the College World Series.

Bold indicates winner.

=== Atlantic I Regional at Tallahassee, FL ===
First round
1 | **Florida State** | **18**
6 | Troy | 2
2 | Ole Miss | 3
5 | **Old Dominion** | **5**
3 | South Alabama | 5
4 | **UCF** | **6**

Second round
1 | **Florida State** | **7**
3 | South Alabama | 2
5 | **Old Dominion** | **7**
4 | UCF | 6
6 | Troy | 5
2 | **Ole Miss** | **8**

Third round
1 | **Florida State** | **7**
5 | Old Dominion | 2
4 | UCF | 4
2 | **Ole Miss** | **10**

Semifinals
5 | Old Dominion | 4
2 | **Ole Miss** | **5**

Final
1 | **Florida State** | **13** | –
2 | Ole Miss | 1 | –

=== Atlantic II Regional at Coral Gables, FL ===
First round
1 | **Miami (FL)** | **3**
6 | UMass | 1
2 | Texas A&M | 5
5 | **FIU** | **9**
3 | **North Carolina** | **6**
4 | South Florida | 3

Second round
1 | **Miami (FL)** | **11**
4 | South Florida | 10
5 | FIU | 5
3 | **North Carolina** | **6**
6 | UMass | 11
2 | **Texas A&M** | **14**

Third round
1 | **Miami (FL)** | 8
3 | North Carolina | 4
5 | FIU | 2
2 | **Texas A&M** | **4**

Semifinals
3 | North Carolina | 0
2 | **Texas A&M** | **7**

Final
1 | **Miami (FL)** | 0 | **5**
2 | Texas A&M | **4** | 2

=== East Region at Clemson, SC ===
First round
1 | **Clemson** | **8**
6 | Navy | 4
2 | Alabama | 0
5 | **Winthrop** | **4**
3 | Jacksonville | 2
4 | **Richmond** | **8**

Second round
1 | **Clemson** | **11**
3 | Jacksonville | 5
5 | **Winthrop** | **9**
4 | Richmond | 8
6 | Navy | 0
2 | **Alabama** | **7**

Third round
1 | **Clemson** | **9**
5 | Winthrop | 5
4 | Richmond | 4
2 | **Alabama** | **11**

Semifinals
5 | Winthrop | 0
2 | **Alabama** | **14**

Final
1 | **Clemson** | **7** | –
2 | Alabama | 4 | –

=== Mideast Regional at Knoxville, TN ===
First round
1 | **Tennessee** | **5**
6 | The Citadel | 2
2 | **Oklahoma State** | **6**
5 | Pittsburgh | 3
3 | **California** | **4**
4 | Georgia Tech | 3

Second round
1 | **Tennessee** | **6**
4 | Georgia Tech | 4
2 | **Oklahoma State** | **15**
3 | California | 4
6 | The Citadel | 10
5 | **Pittsburgh** | **12**

Third round
1 | **Tennessee** | **14**
2 | Oklahoma State | 10
3 | California | 4
5 | **Pittsburgh** | **9**

Semifinals
2 | **Oklahoma State** | **15**
5 | Pittsburgh | 13

Final
1 | **Tennessee** | **3**^{11} | –
2 | Oklahoma State | 1 | –

=== Midwest I Regional at Wichita, KS ===
First round
1 | **Texas Tech** | **24**
6 | Providence | 5
2 | Wichita State | 11
5 | **Lamar** | **13**
3 | **Stanford** | **10**
4 | Arkansas | 3

Second round
1 | **Texas Tech** | **14**
4 | Arkansas | 10
3 | **Stanford** | **8**
5 | Lamar | 1
6 | Providence | 2
2 | **Wichita State** | **6**

Third round
1 | **Texas Tech** | **3**
3 | Stanford | 1
5 | **Lamar** | **4**
2 | Wichita State | 1

Semifinals
3 | **Stanford** | **16**
5 | Lamar | 9

Final
1 | Texas Tech | 2 | 5
3 | **Stanford** | **3** | **6**

=== Midwest II Regional at Oklahoma City, OK ===
Hosted at All Sports Stadium in Oklahoma City, OK

First round
1 | **Auburn** | **2**
6 | Penn | 1
2 | **Oklahoma** | **9**
5 | Indiana State | 6
3 | **Texas** | **10**
4 | Ohio State | 5

Second round
1 | **Auburn** | **8**
4 | Ohio State | 6
2 | **Oklahoma** | **13**
3 | Texas | 9
6 | Penn | 5
5 | **Indiana State** | **6**

Third round
1 | Auburn | 8
2 | **Oklahoma** | **9**
3 | **Texas** | **3**
5 | Indiana State | 2

Semifinals
1 | **Auburn** | **4**
3 | Texas | 2

Final
2 | **Oklahoma** | **3** | –
1 | Auburn | 1 | –

=== South Regional at Baton Rouge, LA ===
First round
1 | **Cal State Fullerton** | **7**
6 | NE Louisiana | 6
2 | **LSU** | **5**
5 | Central Michigan | 3
3 | **Rice** | **8**
4 | James Madison | 7

Second round
1 | **Cal State Fullerton** | **9**
4 | James Madison | 1
2 | LSU | 7
3 | **Rice** | **15**
6 | NE Louisiana | 11
5 | **Central Michigan** | **14**

Third round
1 | **Cal State Fullerton** | **17**
3 | Rice | 7
2 | **LSU** | **10**
5 | Central Michigan | 5

Semifinals
3 | **Rice** | **16**
2 | LSU | 9

Final
1 | **Cal State Fullerton** | **8** | —
3 | Rice | 7 | —

=== West Regional at Fresno, CA ===
First round
1 | **Southern California** | **10**
6 | Middle Tennessee | 4
2 | **Long Beach State** | **14**
5 | SW Missouri State | 11
3 | Fresno State | 5
4 | **Pepperdine** | **9**

Second round
1 | **Southern California** | **22**
3 | Fresno State | 17
2 | **Long Beach State** | **14**
4 | Pepperdine | 3
6 | **Middle Tennessee** | **5**
5 | SW Missouri State | 3

Third round
1 | **Southern California** | **6**
2 | Long Beach State | 5
4 | **Pepperdine** | **18**^{12}
6 | Middle Tennessee | 17

Semifinals
2 | **Long Beach State** | **9**
4 | Pepperdine | 5

Final
1 | **Southern California** | 3 | **9**
2 | Long Beach State | **4** | 2

== College World Series ==
=== Participants ===
| Seeding | School | Conference | Record (conference) | Head coach | CWS appearances | CWS best finish | CWS record |
|---|---|---|---|---|---|---|---|
| 1 | Cal State Fullerton | Big West | 53–9 (18–3) | Augie Garrido | 8 (last: 1994) | 1st (1979, 1984) | 18–14 |
| 2 | Florida State | ACC | 52–14 (16–7) | Mike Martin | 13 (last: 1994) | 2nd (1970, 1986) | 17–26 |
| 3 | Miami (FL) | n/a | 46–15 (n/a) | Jim Morris | 13 (last: 1994) | 1st (1982, 1985) | 27–23 |
| 4 | Clemson | ACC | 54–12 (20–4) | Jack Leggett | 6 (last: 1991) | 5th (1958, 1959, 1976) | 4–12 |
| 5 | Tennessee | SEC | 52–14 (22–8) | Rod Delmonico | 1 (last: 1951) | 2nd (1951) | 4–2 |
| 6 | Southern California | Pac-10 | 45–19 (21–9) | Mike Gillespie | 17 (last: 1978) | 1st (1948, 1958, 1961, 1963, 1968, 1970, 1971, 1972, 1973, 1974, 1978) | 63–19 |
| 7 | Oklahoma | Big 8 | 42–14 (21–7) | Larry Cochell | 8 (last: 1994) | 1st (1951, 1994) | 14–12 |
| 8 | Stanford | Pac-10 | 39–23 (20–10) | Mark Marquess | 8 (last: 1990) | 1st (1987, 1988) | 20–14 |

=== Results ===
==== Bracket ====
First round | Second round
6 | Southern California | 0
3 | Miami (FL) | 15
3 | Miami (FL) | 4
2 | Florida State | 2
7 | Oklahoma | 2
2 | Florida State | 3
Bracket One
7 | Oklahoma | 4
6 | Southern California | 9
2 | Florida State | 11
6 | Southern California | 16
5 | Tennessee | 3
4 | Clemson | 1
5 | Tennessee | 1
1 | Cal State Fullerton | 11
8 | Stanford | 5
1 | Cal State Fullerton | 6
Bracket Two
8 | Stanford | 8
4 | Clemson | 3
5 | Tennessee | 6
8 | Stanford | 2

Semifinals
3 | Miami (FL) | 5 | 3
6 | Southern California | 7 | 7
1 | Cal State Fullerton | 11 | —
5 | Tennessee | 0 | —

Finals
6 | Southern California | 5
1 | Cal State Fullerton | 11

==== Game results ====
| Date | Game | Winner | Score | Loser | Notes |
|---|---|---|---|---|---|
| June 2 | Game 1 | Florida State | 3–2 | Oklahoma | |
| June 2 | Game 2 | Miami (FL) | 15–0 | Southern California | |
| June 3 | Game 3 | Cal State Fullerton | 6–5 | Stanford | |
| June 3 | Game 4 | Tennessee | 3–1 | Clemson | |
| June 4 | Game 5 | Miami (FL) | 4–2 | Florida State | |
| June 4 | Game 6 | Southern California | 9–4 | Oklahoma | Oklahoma eliminated |
| June 5 | Game 7 | Cal State Fullerton | 11–1 | Tennessee | |
| June 5 | Game 8 | Stanford | 8–3 | Clemson | Clemson eliminated |
| June 6 | Game 9 | Southern California | 16–11 | Florida State | Florida State eliminated |
| June 6 | Game 10 | Tennessee | 6–2 | Stanford | Stanford eliminated |
| June 7 | Game 11 | Southern California | 7–5 | Miami (FL) | |
| June 8 | Game 12 | Cal State Fullerton | 11–0 | Tennessee | Tennessee eliminated |
| June 9 | Game 13 | Southern California | 7–3 | Miami (FL) | Miami (FL) eliminated |
| June 10 | Final | Cal State Fullerton | 11–5 | Southern California | Cal State Fullerton wins CWS |

== All-Tournament Team ==
The following players were members of the College World Series All-Tournament Team.

| Position | Player | School |
|---|---|---|
| P | Randy Flores | USC |
| P | Ted Silva | Cal State Fullerton |
| C | Brian Loyd | Cal State Fullerton |
| 1B | Doug Mientkiewicz | Florida State |
| 2B | Wes Rachels | USC |
| 3B | Tony Martinez | Cal State Fullerton |
| SS | Alex Cora | Miami (FL) |
| OF | J. D. Drew | Florida State |
| OF | Geoff Jenkins | USC |
| OF | Mark Kotsay (MOP) | Cal State Fullerton |
| DH | Scott Schroeffel | Tennessee |

=== Notable players ===
- Cal State Fullerton: Jeremy Giambi, Mark Kotsay, Mike Lamb
- Clemson: Kris Benson, Billy Koch, Matt LeCroy, Shane Monahan, Ken Vining, Scott Winchester
- Florida State: Randy Choate, J. D. Drew, Jonathan Johnson, Doug Mientkiewicz
- Miami (FL): Alex Cora, Jay Tessmer
- Oklahoma: Steve Connelly, Damon Minor, Ryan Minor, Russ Ortiz, Mark Redman
- Southern California: Gabe Alvarez, Brian Cooper, Morgan Ensberg, Seth Etherton, Randy Flores, Geoff Jenkins, Jacque Jones, Chad Moeller, Ernie Diaz
- Stanford: Dusty Allen, A. J. Hinch, Jason Middlebrook, Kyle Peterson
- Tennessee: R. A. Dickey, Todd Helton

== Tournament notes ==
- With USC's 22–17 win over Fresno State the two teams set a new tournament record for most combined runs (39).

== See also ==
- 1995 NCAA Division I softball tournament
- 1995 NCAA Division II baseball tournament
- 1995 NCAA Division III baseball tournament
- 1995 NAIA World Series
