= Ted Silva =

American baseball coach and pitcher (born 1974)

Biographical details
- Born: August 4, 1974 (age 52); Inglewood, California, U.S.

Playing career
- 1993–1995: Cal State Fullerton
- 1995: Charleston RiverDogs
- 1996: Charlotte Rangers
- 1996–1997, 1999: Tulsa Drillers
- 2001: Camden Riversharks
- Position: Pitcher

Coaching career (HC unless noted)
- 2004: Villa Park (CA) HS (Asst)
- 2005–2006: Cal State Fullerton (Asst)
- 2007: Fresno State (Asst)
- 2008–2010: UC Irvine Anteaters (Asst)
- 2011: Loyola Marymount (Asst)
- 2012–2019: Nebraska (Asst)
- 2020–2022: USC (P)

Accomplishments and honors

Awards
- Big West Pitcher of the Year (1995)

Theodore A. Silva (born August 4, 1974) is an American baseball coach and former pitcher. Silva played college baseball at California State University, Fullerton from 1993 to 1995 for coach Augie Garrido. He then went on to play in the minor leagues and in the Chinese Professional Baseball League from 1995 to 2001.

Prior to playing professionally, Silva attended Redondo Union High School in Redondo Beach, California. He then attended California State University, Fullerton, where he was a Consensus All-American and made the All-Tournament team in the 1995 College World Series. He was the winning pitcher in the final game of that year's College World Series. He won the Big West Pitcher of the Year that year. He earned a spot on Team USA following the season.

He was drafted by the Texas Rangers in the 21st round of the 1995 Major League Baseball draft and played in their minor league system from 1995 to 1997 and 1999. He had a 3.38 ERA in 11 starts his first campaign, and went 17–4 with a 2.91 ERA in 27 starts in 1996. He won 13 games in 1997 and, after not playing in 1998, returned and went 6–3 with a 4.00 ERA in 13 appearances in 1999. In 2000, he pitched for Kaoping Fala in the Chinese Professional Baseball League before returning stateside for 2001. In independent baseball that year, he had a 5.77 ERA in 28 games. Overall, he was 44–26 with a 3.84 ERA in 105 games (80 starts) in five minor league seasons. He never reached the major leagues.

In 2004, Silva coached for Villa Park High School. He later served as assistant coach for the Cal State Fullerton Titans baseball team from 2005 to 2006, assistant coach for the Fresno State Bulldogs baseball team, pitching coach for the UC Irvine Anteaters baseball team from 2008 to 2010, coach the Loyola Marymount Lions baseball team in 2011, and, after serving as the pitching coach for the Nebraska Cornhuskers baseball team for a spell, became the school's associate head coach and recruiting coordinator through the 2019 season. After leaving Nebraska, Silva served as the pitching coach for USC Trojans Baseball from 2020 through 2022.
