= Jay Tessmer =

American baseball player (born 1971)

- Pitcher
- Born: December 26, 1971 (age 54); Meadville, Pennsylvania, U.S.
- Batted: Right Threw: Right

MLB debut
- August 27, 1998, for the New York Yankees

Last MLB appearance
- April 4, 2002, for the New York Yankees

MLB statistics
- Win–loss record: 1–0
- Earned run average: 7.71
- Strikeouts: 14
- Stats at Baseball Reference

Teams
- New York Yankees (1998–2002)

Jay Tessmer (born December 26, 1971) is an American professional baseball relief pitcher. He played for the New York Yankees of Major League Baseball from 1998 to 2002. Tessmer played professional baseball for eight years, nearly all of them spent with an affiliate of the Yankees. He retired after the 2002 season, where he saw the most of his action with the Yankees' AAA affiliate, the Columbus Clippers.

== Early career ==
Tessmer attended Cochranton Junior-Senior High School in Cochranton, Pennsylvania, and was named All-Crawford County for baseball as a pitcher. He enrolled at the University of Miami, where he played college baseball for the Miami Hurricanes. He played in the 1994 and 1995 College World Series for Miami, and was named Coral Gables Regional most valuable player.

The New York Yankees selected Tessmer in the 19th round of the 1995 MLB draft. He began playing for the team's Single-A affiliate in Oneonta, New York, pitching 38 innings with two wins and a 0.95 earned run average (ERA). The following season, he moved up to the Tampa Yankees and had a 1.48 ERA and 35 saves.

== Later career ==
Tessmer was promoted to the AA Norwich Navigators for 1997, but struggled and fell to 3–6. He returned to Norwich the next year and after improving his ERA to 1.09, he was promoted to Triple A where it was boosted to 0.49. That season, he made his Major League debut against the Anaheim Angels, where he struck out two hitters. He ended his abbreviated Major League season with one win and a 3.12 ERA. In 1999, he had three wins and forty-two strikeouts at AAA, and again played briefly for the Yankees, posting a 14.85 ERA over six games. He struggled with his consistency in 2000, however, going 4–8.

In January 2001, the Yankees traded Tessmer to the Colorado Rockies for David Lee. He played for the Rockies' AAA affiliate, and won one game, but had a 6–10 walks/strikeout ratio, and was traded again to the Milwaukee Brewers. Playing in Indianapolis, he threw 39 strikeouts and had a 4.37 ERA. His contract was not renewed, and he returned to the Yankees in 2002. He played two games in the majors, with a 6.75 ERA. He spent the rest of the year in AAA, winning five game and earning a 4.37 ERA. He would not return to professional baseball.

Jay was inducted into the University of Miami Sports Hall of Fame at its 45th Annual Induction Banquet on Thursday, April 11, 2013.
