= 1995 Clemson Tigers baseball team =

American college baseball season

1995 Clemson Tigers baseball

East Regional champions

College World Series, 0–2
- Conference: Atlantic Coast Conference

Ranking
- Coaches: No. 7
- CB: No. 7
- Record: 54–14 (20–4 ACC)
- Head coach: Jack Leggett (2nd season)
- Assistant coaches: Tim Corbin (2nd season); John Pawlowski (2nd season); Gregg Kilby (2nd season)
- Home stadium: Beautiful Tiger Field

1995 Atlantic Coast Conference baseball standings
| | Conf. | | | | Overall |
| Team | W | | L | PCT | W | | L | PCT |
|---|---|---|---|---|---|---|---|---|
| No. 7 Clemson ‍†‍‍^{y} | 20 | – | 4 | .833 | 54 | – | 14 | .794 |
| No. 5 Florida State ‍‍‡‍^{y} | 16 | – | 7 | .696 | 53 | – | 16 | .768 |
| Georgia Tech ‍‍‍^{y} | 16 | – | 8 | .667 | 38 | – | 22 | .633 |
| No. 25 North Carolina ‍‍‍^{y} | 14 | – | 10 | .583 | 39 | – | 23 | .629 |
| Wake Forest ‍‍‍ | 13 | – | 11 | .542 | 34 | – | 24 | .586 |
| NC State ‍‍‍ | 12 | – | 12 | .500 | 36 | – | 24 | .600 |
| Virginia ‍‍‍ | 8 | – | 15 | .348 | 26 | – | 29 | .473 |
| Duke ‍‍‍ | 4 | – | 20 | .167 | 30 | – | 27 | .526 |
| Maryland ‍‍‍ | 4 | – | 20 | .167 | 20 | – | 37 | .351 |
† – Conference champion ‡ – Tournament champion y – Invited to the NCAA tournament As of June 30, 1995; Rankings from Collegiate Baseball

The 1995 Clemson Tigers baseball team represented Clemson University in the 1995 NCAA Division I baseball season. The team played their home games at Beautiful Tiger Field in Clemson, South Carolina.

The team was coached by Jack Leggett, who completed his second season at Clemson. The Tigers reached the 1995 College World Series, their seventh appearance in Omaha.

== Roster ==
1995 Clemson Tigers roster
| Pitchers: - Kris Benson; - Jason Dawsey; - Jamie Eggleston; - Scott Hauser; - Billy Koch; - Brian Matz; - Jeff Sauve; - Ken Vining; - Mark Watson; - Rodney Williams; - Scott Winchester | Catchers: - Matthew LeCroy; Infielders: - Seth Brizek; - Paul Galloway; - Doug Livingston; - Anthony Bayne; - David Miller; Outfielders: - Gary Burnham; - Shane Monahan; - Jerome Robinson | Unknown: - Eric DeMoura; - Will Duffie; - Jason Embler; - Tim Frantz; - Rusty Rhodes; - Bryan Schroeder; - Ryan Ward |

== Schedule ==
Legend
| | Clemson win |
| | Clemson loss |
| **Bold** | Clemson team member |
| * | Non-Conference game |

1995 Clemson Tigers baseball game log
Regular season

February
| Date | Opponent | Rank | Site/stadium | Score | Overall record | ACC record |
|---|---|---|---|---|---|---|
| Feb 17 | vs Oklahoma State* | | Arlington Athletic Center • Arlington, TX | **L** 2–5 | 0–1 | |
| Feb 18 | at Texas–Arlington* | | Arlington Athletic Center • Arlington, TX | **W** 18–0 | 1–1 | |
| Feb 19 | vs Arkansas State* | | Arlington Athletic Center • Arlington, TX | **W** 7–2 | 2–1 | |
| Feb 24 | George Mason* | | Beautiful Tiger Field • Clemson, SC | **W** 16–2 | 3–1 | |
| Feb 25 | George Mason* | | Beautiful Tiger Field • Clemson, SC | **W** 13–0 | 4–1 | |
| Feb 26 | George Mason* | | Beautiful Tiger Field • Clemson, SC | **W** 9–3 | 5–1 | |

March
| Date | Opponent | Rank | Site/stadium | Score | Overall record | ACC record |
|---|---|---|---|---|---|---|
| Mar 1 | Tennessee* | | Beautiful Tiger Field • Clemson, SC | **W** 6–4 | 6–1 | |
| Mar 2 | Tennessee* | | Beautiful Tiger Field • Clemson, SC | **W** 7–6^{10} | 7–1 | |
| Mar 4 | Old Dominion* | | Beautiful Tiger Field • Clemson, SC | **W** 10–5 | 8–1 | |
| Mar 4 | Old Dominion* | | Beautiful Tiger Field • Clemson, SC | **W** 12–6 | 9–1 | |
| Mar 5 | Old Dominion* | | Beautiful Tiger Field • Clemson, SC | **W** 7–1 | 10–1 | |
| Mar 7 | James Madison* | | Beautiful Tiger Field • Clemson, SC | **W** 5–0 | 11–1 | |
| Mar 8 | James Madison* | | Beautiful Tiger Field • Clemson, SC | **W** 16–6 | 12–1 | |
| Mar 10 | Duke | | Beautiful Tiger Field • Clemson, SC | **W** 10–0 | 13–1 | 1–0 |
| Mar 11 | Duke | | Beautiful Tiger Field • Clemson, SC | **W** 8–4 | 14–1 | 2–0 |
| Mar 12 | Duke | | Beautiful Tiger Field • Clemson, SC | **W** 9–1 | 15–1 | 3–0 |
| Mar 14 | at Western Carolina* | | Hennon Stadium • Cullowhee, NC | **W** 5–2 | 16–1 | |
| Mar 15 | Appalachian State* | | Beautiful Tiger Field • Clemson, SC | **W** 11–0 | 17–1 | |
| Mar 17 | at Wake Forest | | Gene Hooks Stadium • Winston-Salem, NC | **W** 10–7 | 18–1 | 4–0 |
| Mar 18 | at Wake Forest | | Gene Hooks Stadium • Winston-Salem, NC | **W** 4–3 | 19–1 | 5–0 |
| Mar 19 | at Wake Forest | | Gene Hooks Stadium • Winston-Salem, NC | **W** 10–5 | 20–1 | 6–0 |
| Mar 21 | at Old Dominion* | | Bud Metheny Baseball Complex • Norfolk, VA | **W** 9–7 | 21–1 | |
| Mar 22 | at Old Dominion* | | Bud Metheny Baseball Complex • Norfolk, VA | **W** 4–2 | 22–1 | |
| Mar 24 | at Maryland | | Shipley Field • College Park, MD | **W** 4–3^{12} | 23–1 | 7–0 |
| Mar 25 | at Maryland | | Shipley Field • College Park, MD | **W** 11–3 | 24–1 | 8–0 |
| Mar 26 | at Maryland | | Shipley Field • College Park, MD | **W** 12–2 | 25–1 | 9–0 |
| Mar 28 | at South Carolina* | | Sarge Frye Field • Columbia, SC | **L** 2–4 | 25–2 | |
| Mar 29 | Western Carolina* | | Beautiful Tiger Field • Clemson, SC | **W** 5–4 | 26–2 | |
| Mar 31 | North Carolina | | Beautiful Tiger Field • Clemson, SC | **W** 3–2 | 27–2 | 10–0 |

April
| Date | Opponent | Rank | Site/stadium | Score | Overall record | ACC record |
|---|---|---|---|---|---|---|
| Apr 1 | North Carolina | | Beautiful Tiger Field • Clemson, SC | **W** 20–1 | 28–2 | 11–0 |
| Apr 2 | North Carolina | | Beautiful Tiger Field • Clemson, SC | **L** 8–11 | 28–3 | 11–1 |
| Apr 4 | South Carolina | | Beautiful Tiger Field • Clemson, SC | **W** 7–2 | 29–3 | |
| Apr 5 | at Georgia* | | Foley Field • Athens, GA | **L** 7–8 | 29–4 | |
| Apr 7 | Virginia | | Beautiful Tiger Field • Clemson, SC | **W** 5–4 | 30–4 | 12–1 |
| Apr 8 | Virginia | | Beautiful Tiger Field • Clemson, SC | **W** 9–0 | 31–4 | 13–1 |
| Apr 9 | Virginia | | Beautiful Tiger Field • Clemson, SC | **W** 5–2 | 32–4 | 14–1 |
| Apr 11 | Georgia* | | Beautiful Tiger Field • Clemson, SC | **W** 5–4 | 33–4 | |
| Apr 12 | South Carolina* | | Beautiful Tiger Field • Clemson, SC | **W** 11–1 | 34–4 | |
| Apr 14 | at NC State | | Doak Field • Raleigh, NC | **W** 17–15^{10} | 35–4 | 15–1 |
| Apr 15 | at NC State | | Doak Field • Raleigh, NC | **W** 13–1 | 36–4 | 16–1 |
| Apr 16 | at NC State | | Doak Field • Raleigh, NC | **W** 13–4 | 37–4 | 17–1 |
| Apr 18 | Coastal Carolina* | | Beautiful Tiger Field • Clemson, SC | **W** 5–1 | 38–4 | |
| Apr 19 | Coastal Carolina | | Beautiful Tiger Field • Clemson, SC | **W** 7–2 | 39–4 | |
| Apr 21 | at Florida State | | Dick Howser Stadium • Tallahassee, FL | **L** 2–5 | 39–5 | 17–2 |
| Apr 22 | at Florida State | | Dick Howser Stadium • Tallahassee, FL | **L** 2–7 | 39–6 | 17–3 |
| Apr 23 | at Florida State | | Dick Howser Stadium • Tallahassee, FL | **L** 8–9 | 39–7 | 17–4 |
| Apr 25 | Furman* | | Beautiful Tiger Field • Clemson, SC | **W** 19–5 | 40–7 | |
| Apr 26 | at South Carolina* | | Sarge Frye Field • Columbia, SC | **W** 18–6 | 41–7 | |
| Apr 28 | Georgia Tech | | Beautiful Tiger Field • Clemson, SC | **W** 8–5 | 42–7 | 18–4 |
| Apr 29 | Georgia Tech | | Beautiful Tiger Field • Clemson, SC | **W** 6–1 | 43–7 | 19–4 |
| Apr 30 | Georgia Tech | | Beautiful Tiger Field • Clemson, SC | **W** 6–5 | 44–7 | 20–4 |

May
| Date | Opponent | Rank | Site/stadium | Score | Overall record | ACC record |
|---|---|---|---|---|---|---|
| May 7 | at Georgia Southern* | | J. I. Clements Stadium • Statesboro, GA | **W** 7–4 | 45–7 | |
| May 8 | at Georgia Southern* | | J. I. Clements Stadium • Statesboro, GA | **L** 14–15^{12} | 45–8 | |
| May 12 | at Miami (FL)* | | Mark Light Field • Coral Gables, FL | **L** 6–7 | 45–9 | |
| May 13 | at Miami (FL)* | | Mark Light Field • Coral Gables, FL | **W** 7–5 | 46–9 | |
| May 14 | at Miami (FL)* | | Mark Light Field • Coral Gables, FL | **L** 4–8 | 46–10 | |

Postseason

ACC Tournament
| Date | Opponent | Rank | Site/stadium | Score | Overall record | ACCT Record |
|---|---|---|---|---|---|---|
| May 17 | Maryland | | Greenville Municipal Stadium • Greenville, SC | **W** 10–0 | 47–10 | 1–0 |
| May 18 | North Carolina | | Greenville Municipal Stadium • Greenville, SC | **W** 6–4 | 48–10 | 2–0 |
| May 19 | Florida State | | Greenville Municipal Stadium • Greenville, SC | **W** 11–0 | 49–10 | 3–0 |
| May 20 | NC State | | Greenville Municipal Stadium • Greenville, SC | **W** 16–7 | 50–10 | 4–0 |
| May 20 | Florida State | | Greenville Municipal Stadium • Greenville, SC | **W** 2–12 | 50–11 | 4–1 |
| May 21 | Florida State | | Greenville Municipal Stadium • Greenville, SC | **L** 2–8 | 50–12 | 4–2 |

NCAA East Regional
| Date | Opponent | Rank | Site/stadium | Score | Overall record | Regional Record |
|---|---|---|---|---|---|---|
| May 25 | Navy | | Beautiful Tiger Field • Clemson, SC | **W** 8–4 | 51–12 | 1–0 |
| May 26 | Jacksonville | | Beautiful Tiger Field • Clemson, SC | **W** 11–5 | 52–12 | 2–0 |
| May 27 | Winthrop | | Beautiful Tiger Field • Clemson, SC | **W** 9–5 | 53–12 | 3–0 |
| May 28 | Alabama | | Beautiful Tiger Field • Clemson, SC | **W** 7–4 | 54–12 | 4–0 |

NCAA College World Series
| Date | Opponent | Rank | Site/stadium | Score | Overall record | CWS record |
|---|---|---|---|---|---|---|
| June 3 | Tennessee | | Johnny Rosenblatt Stadium • Omaha, NE | **L** 1–3 | 54–13 | 0–1 |
| June 4 | Stanford | | Johnny Rosenblatt Stadium • Omaha, NE | **L** 3–8 | 54–14 | 0–2 |
