= Mickey Lopez =

American baseball player (born 1973)

- Second baseman
- Born: November 17, 1973 (age 52); Miami, Florida, U.S.
- Batted: Switch Threw: Right

MLB debut
- September 6, 2004, for the Seattle Mariners

Last MLB appearance
- October 3, 2004, for the Seattle Mariners

MLB statistics
- At bats: 4
- Batting average: .250
- Stats at Baseball Reference

Teams
- Seattle Mariners (2004)

Raymond Michael Lopez (born November 17, 1973) is an American former Major League Baseball (MLB) second baseman. He played in six games for the Seattle Mariners in 2004. He had one hit in four at bats, with one walk. He was a switch hitter who threw right-handed.

== Playing career ==
Lopez attended Westminster Christian High School in Palmetto Bay, Florida. He was high school teammates with Alex Rodriguez, moving from shortstop to let the younger future Mariners All-Star play the position. Lopez then played college baseball for the Florida State Seminoles. He was named to the All-Atlantic Coast Conference (ACC) team in 1994 and All-ACC Tournament team in 1994 and 1995. He ranks among the top 10 in program history in triples and stolen bases. In 1994, he played collegiate summer baseball with the Orleans Cardinals of the Cape Cod Baseball League.

The Milwaukee Brewers selected Lopez in the 13th round of the 1995 MLB draft. He was a Pioneer League postseason all-star that year and a Texas League mid-season all-star in 1997. He played in the minor leagues for the Brewers, Philadelphia Phillies, and Chicago Cubs before joining the Mariners organization in April 2003. He was named the most valuable player of the Tacoma Rainiers that season. Lopez returned to Tacoma in 2004, ranking second in the Pacific Coast League in runs scored and third in hits.

Lopez was a September call-up to the Mariners. He got his only MLB hit, a single, in his final plate appearance on October 3. He played in six MLB games, entering all off the bench. Lopez played his final professional season with the Fresno Grizzlies in 2005.

== Personal life ==
Lopez is married and lives near his hometown of Cutler Bay, Florida. He has coached his son's baseball team.

== See also ==
- List of Cuban Americans
