= 1995 USC Trojans baseball team =

American college baseball season

1995 USC Trojans baseball

Pac-10 South Division West Regional Champions

College World Series, Runner-Up
- Conference: Pacific-10 Conference
- South

Ranking
- Coaches: No. 2
- CB: No. 2
- Record: 49–21 (21–9 Pac-10)
- Head coach: Mike Gillespie (9th season)
- Home stadium: Dedeaux Field

1995 Pacific-10 Conference baseball standings
	Conf.				Overall
Team	W		L	PCT	W		L	PCT
Northern
Washington State ^{x}‍‍‍	18	–	12	.600	20	–	30	.400
Washington ‍‍‍	16	–	14	.533	24	–	30	.444
Gonzaga ‍‍‍	15	–	15	.500	29	–	25	.537
Oregon State ‍‍‍	14	–	16	.467	25	–	24	.510
Portland ‍‍‍	14	–	16	.467	24	–	25	.490
Portland State ‍‍‍	13	–	17	.433	19	–	36	.345
Southern
No. 2 Southern California ^{x}‍‍‍^{y}	21	–	9	.700	49	–	21	.700
No. 6 Stanford ‍‍‍^{y}	20	–	10	.667	40	–	25	.615
No. 29 California ‍‍‍	18	–	12	.600	32	–	25	.561
Arizona State ‍‍‍	13	–	17	.433	34	–	21	.618
UCLA ‍‍‍	12	–	18	.400	29	–	28	.509
Arizona ‍‍‍	6	–	24	.200	20	–	35	.364
x – Division champion y – Invited to the NCAA tournament As of June 30, 1997; Rankings from Collegiate Baseball

The 1995 USC Trojans baseball team represented the University of Southern California in the 1995 NCAA Division I baseball season. The Trojans played their home games at Dedeaux Field. The team was coached by Mike Gillespie in his 9th season at USC.

The Trojans won the Pac-10 Conference and the West Regional before losing in the College World Series, defeated by the Cal State Fullerton Titans in the championship game.

== Roster ==
1995 USC Trojans roster
Pitchers: Brian Cooper; Seth Etherton - Freshman; Randy Flores - Sophomore; Jason Garner; Ben Tucker	Catchers: Chad Moeller; Richard Haskin; Jason Brown; Infielders: Gabe Alvarez; Derek Baker; Wes Rachels - Freshman; Mike Luzanilla; Greg Walbridge; Dave Valdez	Outfielders: Paul Cruz; Walter Dawkins; Geoff Jenkins - Junior; Jacque Jones - Sophomore

== Schedule and results ==
Legend
USC win
USC loss
USC tie

1995 USC Trojans baseball game log
Regular season (39–18)

January (0–1)
Date	Opponent	Site/stadium	Score	Overall record	Pac-10 record
January 31	Cal State Northridge	Dedeaux Field • Los Angeles, California	2–4	0–1	–

February (14–5)
Date	Opponent	Site/stadium	Score	Overall record	Pac-10 record
February 2	Washington State	Dedeaux Field • Los Angeles, California	8–0	1–1	–
February 3	Pepperdine	Dedeaux Field • Los Angeles, California	2–1	2–1	–
February 4	at Pepperdine	Eddy D. Field Stadium • Malibu, California	5–4	3–1	–
February 5	Pepperdine	Dedeaux Field • Los Angeles, California	12–1	4–1	–
February 7	Loyola Marymount	Dedeaux Field • Los Angeles, California	13–4	5–1	–
February 9	UC Riverside	Dedeaux Field • Los Angeles, California	7–6	6–1	–
February 11	Long Beach State	Dedeaux Field • Los Angeles, California	2–3	6–2	–
February 12	at Long Beach State	Blair Field • Long Beach, California	9–7	7–2	–
February 15	at Loyola Marymount	George C. Page Stadium • Los Angeles, California	9–1	8–2	–
February 17	San Diego	Dedeaux Field • Los Angeles, California	6–5	9–2	–
February 18	San Diego	Dedeaux Field • Los Angeles, California	3–5	9–3	–
February 19	at San Diego	John Cunningham Stadium • San Diego, California	10–3	10–3	–
February 21	at Cal State Fullerton	Goodwin Field • Fullerton, California	9–10	10–4	–
February 24	at Hawaii	Les Murakami Stadium • Honolulu, Hawaii	6–2	11–4	–
February 25	at Hawaii	Les Murakami Stadium • Honolulu, Hawaii	2–3	11–5	–
February 26	at Hawaii	Les Murakami Stadium • Honolulu, Hawaii	1–4	11–6	–
February 27	at Hawaii–Hilo	Wong Stadium • Hilo, Hawaii	10–3	12–6	–
February 27	at Hawaii–Hilo	Wong Stadium • Hilo, Hawaii	5–3	13–6	–

March (8–8)
Date	Opponent	Site/stadium	Score	Overall record	Pac-10 record
March 4	at UCLA	Jackie Robinson Stadium • Los Angeles, California	5–2	14–6	1–0
March 6	UCLA	Dedeaux Field • Los Angeles, California	9–3	15–6	2–0
March 6	UCLA	Dedeaux Field • Los Angeles, California	4–9	15–7	2–1
March 7	at San Diego State	Unknown • San Diego, California	5–12	15–8	2–1
March 12	Stanford	Dedeaux Field • Los Angeles, California	4–5	15–9	2–2
March 12	Stanford	Dedeaux Field • Los Angeles, California	5–1	16–9	3–2
March 13	Stanford	Dedeaux Field • Los Angeles, California	1–9	16–10	3–3
March 14	UC Santa Barbara	Dedeaux Field • Los Angeles, California	3–2	17–10	3–3
March 17	at Arizona State	Packard Stadium • Tempe, Arizona	6–7	17–11	3–4
March 18	at Arizona State	Packard Stadium • Tempe, Arizona	9–10	17–12	3–5
March 19	at Arizona State	Packard Stadium • Tempe, Arizona	4–10	17–13	3–6
March 24	Arizona	Dedeaux Field • Los Angeles, California	7–3	18–13	4–6
March 25	Arizona	Dedeaux Field • Los Angeles, California	6–8	18–14	4–7
March 26	Arizona	Dedeaux Field • Los Angeles, California	11–8	19–14	5–7
March 28	Cal State Fullerton	Dedeaux Field • Los Angeles, California	7–4	20–14	5–7
March 31	at California	Evans Diamond • Berkeley, California	6–1	21–14	6–7

April (15–3)
Date	Opponent	Site/stadium	Score	Overall record	Pac-10 record
April 1	at California	Evans Diamond • Berkeley, California	3–5	21–15	6–8
April 2	at California	Evans Diamond • Berkeley, California	6–1	22–15	7–8
April 4	Cal State Northridge	Dedeaux Field • Los Angeles, California	7–5	23–15	7–8
April 7	Arizona State	Dedeaux Field • Los Angeles, California	9–0	24–15	8–8
April 8	Arizona State	Dedeaux Field • Los Angeles, California	8–7	25–15	9–8
April 9	Arizona State	Dedeaux Field • Los Angeles, California	7–6	26–15	10–8
April 11	at Long Beach State	Blair Field • Long Beach, California	10–3	27–15	10–8
April 13	at Stanford	Sunken Diamond • Stanford, California	7–5	28–15	11–8
April 14	at Stanford	Sunken Diamond • Stanford, California	6–4	29–15	12–8
April 16	at Stanford	Sunken Diamond • Stanford, California	9–8	30–15	13–8
April 18	at UC Santa Barbara	Caesar Uyesaka Stadium • Santa Barbara, California	9–7	31–15	13–8
April 21	at UCLA	Jackie Robinson Stadium • Los Angeles, California	7–3	32–15	14–8
April 22	UCLA	Dedeaux Field • Los Angeles, California	13–8	33–15	15–8
April 23	at UCLA	Jackie Robinson Stadium • Los Angeles, California	8–7	34–15	16–8
April 26	at Cal State Northridge	Matador Field • Northridge, California	10–12	35–16	16–8
April 28	California	Dedeaux Field • Los Angeles, California	3–5	35–17	16–9
April 29	California	Dedeaux Field • Los Angeles, California	13–2	36–17	17–9
April 30	California	Dedeaux Field • Los Angeles, California	7–4	37–17	18–9

May (3–1)
Date	Opponent	Site/stadium	Score	Overall record	Pac-10 record
May 1	Cal State Dominguez Hills	Dedeaux Field • Los Angeles, California	6–7	37–18	18–9
May 13	at Arizona	Jerry Kindall Field at Frank Sancet Stadium • Tucson, Arizona	11–3	37–18	19–9
May 14	at Arizona	Jerry Kindall Field at Frank Sancet Stadium • Tucson, Arizona	15–4	38–18	20–9
May 15	at Arizona	Jerry Kindall Field at Frank Sancet Stadium • Tucson, Arizona	9–8	39–18	21–9

Postseason (10–3)

1995 Pac-10 Conference Championship (2–0)
Date	Opponent	Site/stadium	Score	Overall record	Pac-10 record
May 18	Washington State	Dedeaux Field • Los Angeles, California	9–6	40–18	21–9
May 9	Washington State	Dedeaux Field • Los Angeles, California	4–0	41–18	21–9

West Regional (4–1)
Date	Opponent	Site/stadium	Score	Overall record	Pac-10 record
May 25	vs Middle Tennessee State	Pete Beiden Field at Bob Bennett Stadium • Fresno, California	10–4	42–18	21–9
May 26	at Fresno State	Pete Beiden Field at Bob Bennett Stadium • Fresno, California	22–17	43–18	21–9
May 27	vs Long Beach State	Pete Beiden Field at Bob Bennett Stadium • Fresno, California	6–5	44–18	21–9
May 28	vs Long Beach State	Pete Beiden Field at Bob Bennett Stadium • Fresno, California	3–4	44–19	21–9
May 28	vs Long Beach State	Pete Beiden Field at Bob Bennett Stadium • Fresno, California	9–2	45–19	21–9

1995 College World Series (4–2)
Date	Opponent	Site/stadium	Score	Overall record	Pac-10 record
June 2	vs Miami (FL)	Johnny Rosenblatt Stadium • Omaha, Nebraska	10–15	45–20	21–9
June 4	vs Oklahoma	Johnny Rosenblatt Stadium • Omaha, Nebraska	9–4	46–20	21–9
June 6	vs Florida State	Johnny Rosenblatt Stadium • Omaha, Nebraska	16–11	47–20	21–9
June 7	vs Miami (FL)	Johnny Rosenblatt Stadium • Omaha, Nebraska	7–5	48–20	21–9
June 9	vs Miami (FL)	Johnny Rosenblatt Stadium • Omaha, Nebraska	7–3	49–20	21–9
June 10	vs Cal State Fullerton	Johnny Rosenblatt Stadium • Omaha, Nebraska	5–11	49–21	21–9

Schedule source:

== Awards and honors ==
Geoff Jenkins

- Pac-12 Conference Baseball Player of the Year
- All Tournament Team
- Baseball America 1st Team All-American
- Collegiate Baseball 1st Team All-American
- NCBWA 1st Team All-American
- American Baseball Coaches Association 2nd Team All-American
- 1st Team All-Pacific-10 Conference

Wes Rachels

- All Tournament Team

Randy Flores

- Pac-12 Conference Baseball Pitcher of the Year
- All Tournament Team
- Collegiate Baseball 3rd Team All-American
- 1st Team All-Pacific-10 Conference

Gabe Alvaraz

- ABCA 1st Team All-American
- NCBWA 1st Team All-American
- Collegiate Baseball 2nd Team All-American
- Baseball America 3rd Team All-American
- 1st Team All-Pacific-10 Conference

Walter Dawkins

- NCBWA 2nd Team All-American
- 1st Team All-Pacific-10 Conference

Jason Garner

- Collegiate Baseball 2nd Team All-American
- American Baseball Coaches Association 3rd Team All-American
- 1st Team All-Pacific-10 Conference

Jacque Jones

- NCBWA 3rd Team All-American
- 1st Team All-Pacific-10 Conference
