= Steve Connelly =

American baseball player and coach

- Pitcher
- Born: April 27, 1974 (age 50); Long Beach, California, U.S.
- Batted: Right Threw: Right

MLB debut
- June 28, 1998, for the Oakland Athletics

Last MLB appearance
- July 24, 1998, for the Oakland Athletics

MLB statistics
- Win–loss record: 0–0
- Earned run average: 1.93
- Strikeouts: 1
- Stats at Baseball Reference

Teams
- Oakland Athletics (1998)

Steven Lee Connelly (born April 27, 1974) is an American former professional baseball pitcher and the current pitching coach for the Las Vegas Aviators, the Triple-A affiliate of Oakland Athletics. He played for the Oakland Athletics of Major League Baseball during the 1998 season.

== Early life ==
Connelly was born in Long Beach, California and graduated from Woodrow Wilson High School. Upon graduation Connelly was drafted by the Pittsburgh Pirates but chose instead to attend the University of Oklahoma where he helped contribute to the 1994 National Championship team. In 1994, he played collegiate summer baseball with the Yarmouth–Dennis Red Sox of the Cape Cod Baseball League.

== Playing career ==
Steve Connelly was drafted in the 24th round by the Oakland Athletics in the 1995 amateur draft, Connelly spent 4 years within the Oakland organization. Placed on waivers after the 1998 season, Connelly spent the next 5 seasons within the San Francisco Giants' organization before ending a 9-year professional career.

== Coaching career ==
In 2014, Connelly began his coaching career with the Vermont Lake Monsters. In 2015, he coached the Beloit Snappers. In 2016, Connelly was named as the pitching coach for the Stockton Ports. He was promoted to the Midland RockHounds for the 2018 season.
