= Jonathan Johnson (baseball) =

American baseball player (born 1974)

CIU Rams
- Pitcher / Coach
- Born: July 16, 1974 (age 52); LaGrange, Georgia, U.S.
- Batted: Right Threw: Right

MLB debut
- September 27, 1998, for the Texas Rangers

Last MLB appearance
- June 13, 2003, for the Houston Astros

MLB statistics
- Win–loss record: 2–4
- Earned run average: 6.63
- Strikeouts: 68
- Stats at Baseball Reference

Teams
- Texas Rangers (1998–2001); San Diego Padres (2002); Houston Astros (2003)

Jonathan Kent Johnson (born July 16, 1974) is an American former Major League Baseball pitcher who played for six seasons. He played for the Texas Rangers from 1998 to 2001, the San Diego Padres in 2002, and the Houston Astros in 2003.

In 2018, he was named the first head coach of the new college baseball program at Columbia International University.

== High school and college career ==
Johnson attended high school at Forest High School in Ocala, Florida. In his senior year, he committed to playing college baseball at Florida State University and was considered to be "clearly the most dominant pitcher" in his region. After graduating from high school, he spent three seasons with the Florida State Seminoles baseball team.

In his freshman season, Johnson finished the year with a 10–1 record, a 1.68 earned run average (ERA), and 124 strikeouts in 107 1/3 innings pitched. He was named Atlantic Coast Conference (ACC) Rookie of the Year and was named to Baseball America's All-Freshman team. The following year, Johnson finished his sophomore season with a 12–1 record and 137 strikeouts, and earned third-team All-America and second-team All-ACC honors. Johnson also played in the 1994 College World Series, pitching against the Georgia Tech Yellow Jackets baseball team. In his junior year, Johnson finished the season with a 12–3 record, leading Florida State to the ACC Championship. He also participated in the 1995 College World Series, and was a finalist for the 1995 Golden Spikes Award, as well as being a Baseball America first-team All-American. In 1995, he played collegiate summer baseball with the Orleans Cardinals of the Cape Cod Baseball League.

Johnson was admitted to the Florida State University Hall of Fame in 2006. Jonathan Johnson coached for the Dutch Fork Silver Foxes in Irmo, South Carolina. Currently, he is the manager of the Lexington County Blowfish.

== Professional career ==
Johnson was drafted by the Texas Rangers in the first round of the 1995 Major League Baseball draft, and signed with the team on July 18. He spent the next few seasons in the minor leagues until he made his debut on September 27, 1998, making the start and allowing four earned runs in 4 1/3 innings. He made one more appearance in 1999, then in 2000 he pitched in 15 games for the Rangers, finishing the season with a 1–1 record and a 6.21 ERA. After starting the 2001 season with the Rangers, he was sent to the Arizona Diamondbacks, but did not play a game for the team.

After two seasons of play, one with the San Diego Padres and one with the Houston Astros, Johnson retired. In 2006, he was signed by the Atlanta Braves and joined their minor league system, hoping to make a major league comeback. He spent two seasons with the Richmond Braves before being released.
