= Kyle Peterson =

American baseball player (born 1976)

- Pitcher
- Born: April 9, 1976 (age 49); Elkhorn, Nebraska, U.S.
- Batted: Left Threw: Right

MLB debut
- July 19, 1999, for the Milwaukee Brewers

Last MLB appearance
- July 5, 2001, for the Milwaukee Brewers

MLB statistics
- Win–loss record: 5–9
- Earned run average: 4.71
- Strikeouts: 46
- Stats at Baseball Reference

Teams
- Milwaukee Brewers (1999, 2001)

Kyle Johnathan Peterson (born April 9, 1976) is an American former Major League Baseball pitcher who played for the Milwaukee Brewers in 1999 and 2001.

== Amateur career ==
Peterson played college baseball at Stanford University. In 1995 and 1996, he played collegiate summer baseball with the Cotuit Kettleers of the Cape Cod Baseball League.

== Professional career ==
Peterson was drafted by the Brewers as the 13th overall pick in the first round of the 1997 MLB draft. He made his major league debut in 1999. After that season, he did not again play in the majors until 2001. While in the minors with the Triple-A Indianapolis Indians in 2001, Peterson was one of four players profiled in the documentary film "A Player To Be Named Later". He retired from the game after 2002.

== Broadcasting career ==
Upon retirement, Peterson joined ESPN as an analyst on College, Major League and Little League events. Since 2003, Peterson has covered the College World Series, Little League World Series, and Major League playoffs. Peterson now works as an analyst for the SEC Network.
