= Mark Kotsay =

American baseball player and manager (born 1975)

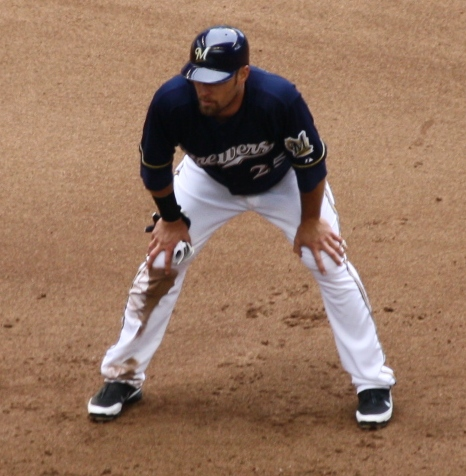
- Kotsay with the Milwaukee Brewers in 2011

Athletics – No. 7
- Outfielder / Manager
- Born: December 2, 1975 (age 50); Whittier, California, U.S.
- Batted: Left Threw: Left

MLB debut
- July 11, 1997, for the Florida Marlins

Last MLB appearance
- September 29, 2013, for the San Diego Padres

MLB statistics (through July 12, 2026)
- Batting average: .276
- Home runs: 127
- Runs batted in: 720
- Managerial record: 296–448
- Winning %: .398
- Stats at Baseball Reference
- Managerial record at Baseball Reference

Teams
- As player: Florida Marlins (1997–2000); San Diego Padres (2001–2003); Oakland Athletics (2004–2007); Atlanta Braves (2008); Boston Red Sox (2008–2009); Chicago White Sox (2009–2010); Milwaukee Brewers (2011); San Diego Padres (2012–2013); As manager: Oakland Athletics / Athletics (2022–present); As coach: San Diego Padres (2015); Oakland Athletics (2016–2021)

Career highlights and awards
- Golden Spikes Award (1995)
Medals
Men's baseball
Representing United States
Olympic Games
Bronze medal – third place	1996 Atlanta	Team

Mark Steven Kotsay (born December 2, 1975) is an American professional baseball manager and former outfielder. He is the manager for the Athletics of Major League Baseball (MLB). As a player, Kotsay appeared in 1,914 MLB games for the San Diego Padres, Florida Marlins, Athletics, Atlanta Braves, Boston Red Sox, Chicago White Sox, and Milwaukee Brewers. He coached for the Padres and Athletics before becoming the Athletics' manager for the 2022 season.

== Amateur career ==
Born in Whittier, but raised in Santa Fe Springs, California, Kotsay attended Santa Fe High School. He batted .408 with a 4–0 win–loss record and 3.18 earned run average in his senior season. He also played for the school's American football and basketball teams.

Kotsay enrolled at California State University, Fullerton to play college baseball for the Cal State Fullerton Titans. Kotsay spent the summer of 1994 playing for the Bourne Braves of the Cape Cod Baseball League where he was named a league all-star. In 1995, Kotsay won the Golden Spikes Award and was the Most Outstanding Player of the College World Series (CWS), as Fullerton won its third Series championship. In addition to being an outfielder, Kotsay was a closer in college; he pitched the final five outs to clinch his team's CWS title. Kotsay was a consensus choice as an All-American in 1995 and 1996.

== Professional playing career ==
=== Florida Marlins ===
The Florida Marlins selected Kotsay in the first round, with the ninth overall pick, of the 1996 Major League Baseball draft.

Kotsay appeared in 14 games for the Marlins in 1997 before taking over as the team's center fielder in 1998. He was moved to right field after Gary Sheffield was traded, a position better suited for the strong throwing arm which Kotsay regularly showed off. As a rookie, he led all National League outfielders with 20 assists, and led them again in his second year with the same number. In 2000, he led all right fielders with 13 assists. At the plate, Kotsay was an average hitter during these years, hitting around .280 with occasional power and the occasional stolen base.

=== San Diego Padres (first stint) ===
Kotsay was traded in 2001, barely a week before Opening Day, to the San Diego Padres as part of a deal for Matt Clement and Eric Owens. Moved back to center field, Kotsay improved his hitting, but he recorded only four outfield assists. This can be largely attributed to the fact that few chose to run on Kotsay. Over the next two seasons, however, Kotsay was defensively back on form, leading all National League center fielders in that category. Kotsay hit .291 with a .807 OPS in 2001 and .292 with a .810 OPS in 2002. After his batting average slipped to .266 with a .726 OPS in 2003, Kotsay was traded to the Oakland Athletics for Terrence Long and Ramón Hernández.

=== Oakland Athletics ===
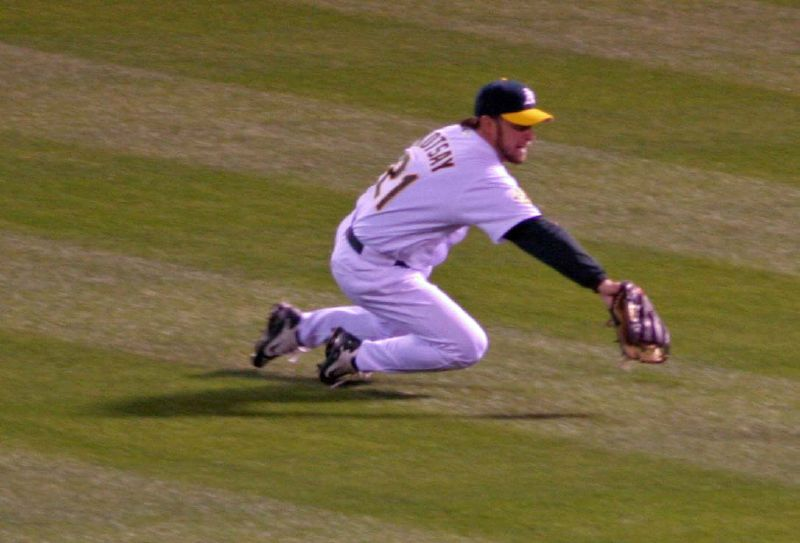
Kotsay with the Athletics in 2006

With Oakland in 2004, Kotsay batted a career-best .314 hitting second in the A's lineup. Displaying his customary strong arm afield, he led American League center fielders with 11 assists.

On July 9, 2005, the Athletics announced that Kotsay and the team had come to terms on a three-year, $29 million contract extension. The extension kept Kotsay under contract with the Athletics through the 2008 season and included a no-trade clause through the 2006 season. News of the contract extension ended speculation that Kotsay would be traded to a team in need of a starting center fielder, such as the New York Yankees.

On Mother's Day, May 14, 2006, Kotsay was one of more than 50 hitters who brandished a pink bat to benefit the Breast Cancer Foundation. He was one of a handful of players to hit a pink bat home run.

The 2006 season marked Kotsay's first-ever appearance in a postseason game, as the Athletics clinched the 2006 AL West Division title. On October 4, he hit his first postseason home run against Minnesota Twins pitcher Dennys Reyes for a two-run inside-the-park home run which scored Jason Kendall to put the A's ahead 4–2, leading his team to win Game 2 of the ALDS.

Kotsay underwent back surgery during spring training 2007, and missed the first two months of the 2007 campaign.

=== Atlanta Braves ===
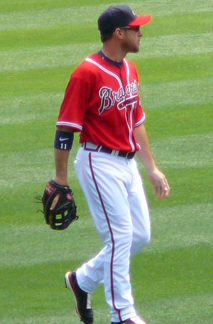
Kotsay with the Braves in 2008.

On January 14, 2008, after passing a physical, Kotsay was officially traded to the Atlanta Braves along with $5.3 million of his $7.3 million salary from the Athletics for Joey Devine and prospect Jamie Richmond.

On August 14, 2008, Kotsay became the first Atlanta Brave to hit for the cycle since Albert Hall did it in 1987. He doubled to right in the seventh inning against Bob Howry of the Chicago Cubs. The double that completed the cycle was also Kotsay's 1,500th career hit. He would hit another single in the ninth inning to have his third career five-hit game and first since 2005. However, despite the great effort, the Braves lost to the Cubs 11–7.

=== Boston Red Sox ===
On August 27, 2008, Kotsay was traded to the Boston Red Sox for minor league outfielder Luis Sumoza.

Kotsay quickly became the Red Sox's preferred first baseman after third baseman Mike Lowell was lost for the season due to injury and Kevin Youkilis was moved to third. Supplanting Sean Casey, he was the regular first baseman throughout the playoffs. He finished the Sox regular season batting .226/.286/.345 in 84 at-bats, and he batted .250/.250/.325 in the playoffs.

On January 9, 2009, Kotsay agreed to a one-year, $1.5 million deal with incentives to return to the Red Sox. He underwent back surgery to remove a displaced disc in February 2009 but did not miss significant time.

On July 24, 2009, Kotsay was designated for assignment by the Red Sox to free up a roster spot for newly acquired Adam LaRoche.

=== Chicago White Sox ===
On July 28, 2009, Kotsay was traded to Chicago White Sox for minor league outfielder Brian Anderson and cash considerations. On November 5, 2009, he was re-signed by the White Sox for a one-year, $1.5 million deal. In 2010, Kotsay appeared in 107 games, primarily as a designated hitter and first baseman, hitting .239/.306/.376.

=== Milwaukee Brewers ===
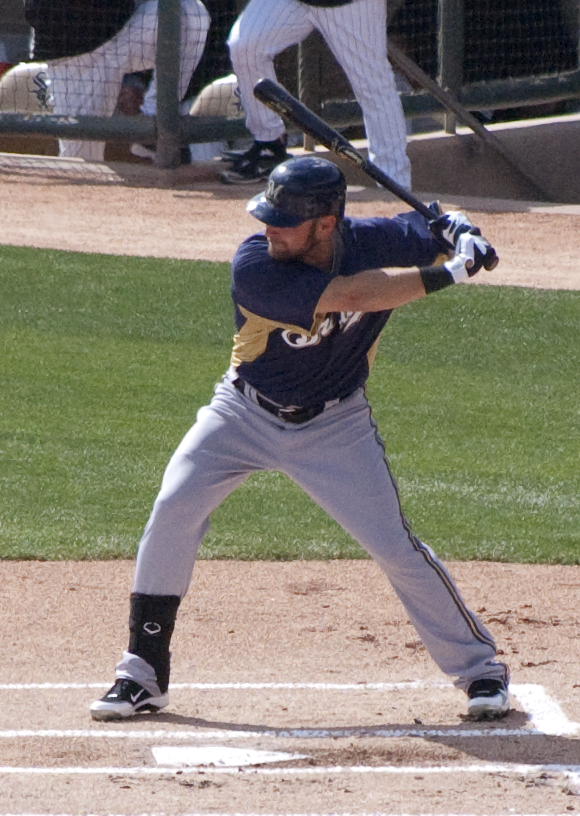
Kotsay with the Brewers in 2011.

On February 1, 2011, Kotsay agreed to sign a one-year contract with the Milwaukee Brewers. The contract was worth $800,000 plus $450,000 in incentives.

Kotsay served as a utility player, mostly as a reserve outfield and pinch hitter.

In 2011, he batted .270 with three home runs in 233 at-bats. Through 2011, he was fifth of all active major leaguers in career outfield assists, with 120.

=== San Diego Padres (second stint) ===
On November 15, 2011, Kotsay signed a one-year deal, worth $1.25 million, with the San Diego Padres.

Kotsay began the year on the disabled list with a calf strain. He made his regular season debut on April 17, 2012. He had another stint on the disabled list in May with a lower back strain. On August 12, 2012, Kotsay signed a one-year extension to stay with the Padres through 2013 for $1.3 million. Kotsay was hitting .275/.333/.363 with a home run and 9 RBI in 55 games before the deal. Kotsay made 26 starts in the field and had 51 appearances as a pinch hitter, batting .259/.314/.357 overall. His 13 pinch-hits tied him for second in the Major Leagues.

In 2013, Kotsay made 23 starts in the field at the corner outfield spots and first base but appeared in 104 games, mostly as a pinch hitter. He finished the season hitting .194/.253/.226 in 155 at-bats. On September 14, Kotsay announced he would retire after the 2013 season. Kotsay was honored in a special ceremony in his final home game at Petco Park on September 26.

=== Career statistics ===
In 1,914 games over 17 seasons, Kotsay posted a .276 batting average (1,784-for-6,464) with 790 runs, 353 doubles, 48 triples, 127 home runs, 720 RBI, 98 stolen bases, 554 bases on balls, .332 on-base percentage and .404 slugging percentage. He finished his career with a .989 fielding percentage playing at all three outfield positions and first base. In 26 postseason games, he hit .207 (17-for-82) with nine runs, two home runs, 3 RBI and five walks.

== Post-playing career ==
Kotsay joined the Padres' front office in 2014 as a special assistant. On December 1, 2014, the Padres announced Kotsay as their new hitting coach, replacing Phil Plantier.

On November 12, 2015, the Oakland Athletics named Kotsay their new bench coach, replacing Mike Aldrete. In 2017, he became the quality control coach for the Athletics. On December 22, 2021, the Athletics promoted Kotsay to become their manager for the 2022 season. In November 2023, the Athletics announced that Kotsay's option for the 2024 season had been picked up. On February 17, 2025, Kotsay and the Athletics agreed to a three-year contract extension.

== Managerial record ==
As of September 27,2026

Team	Year	Regular season					Postseason			
Team	Year	Games	Won	Lost	Win %	Finish	Won	Lost	Win %	Result
OAK	2022	162	60	102	.370	5th in AL West	–	–	–	–
OAK	2023	162	50	112	.309	5th in AL West	–	–	–	–
OAK	2024	162	69	93	.426	4th in AL West	–	–	–	–
ATH	2025	162	76	86	.469	4th in AL West	–	–	–	–
ATH	2026	162	64	98	.398	4th in AL West	–	–	–	–
Total		810	319	491	.393		0	0	–	–

== Honors ==
In 2019, Kotsay was inducted into the National College Baseball Hall of Fame.

== Personal life ==
Kotsay and his wife Jamie have three children.

Kotsay is a devout Roman Catholic. His father, Steve Kotsay, is a retired Los Angeles Police Motorcycle Officer.

== See also ==
- List of Major League Baseball players to hit for the cycle

Achievements
Preceded by Carlos Gómez	Hitting for the cycle August 14, 2008	Succeeded by Cristian Guzmán
Sporting positions
Preceded by Phil Plantier	San Diego Padres hitting coach 2015	Succeeded by Alan Zinter
Preceded by Mike Aldrete	Oakland Athletics Bench Coach; 2016–2017	Succeeded by Ryan Christenson
