= 1995 Major League Baseball draft =

Baseball draft of amateur players

General information
- Date: June 1995

Overview
- First selection: Darin Erstad; California Angels
- Hall of Famers: 3: 1B Todd Helton; P Roy Halladay; CF Carlos Beltrán

The 1995 Major League Baseball draft began June 1995 to assign amateur baseball players to MLB teams. The draft order is the reverse order of the 1994 MLB season standings. In addition, compensation picks were distributed for players who did not sign from the 1994 MLB draft. The California Angels received the first overall selection, choosing Darin Erstad.

== First round selections ==
The following are the first round picks in the 1995 Major League Baseball draft.

= All-Star	= Baseball Hall of Famer

Pick	Player	Team	Position	Hometown/School
1	Darin Erstad	California Angels	OF	Nebraska
2	Ben Davis	San Diego Padres	C	Malvern Preparatory School (PA)
3	José Cruz Jr.	Seattle Mariners	OF	Rice
4	Kerry Wood	Chicago Cubs	RHP	Grand Prairie High School (TX)
5	Ariel Prieto	Oakland Athletics	RHP	Manuel Fajardo College (PR)
6	Jaime Jones	Florida Marlins	OF	Rancho Bernardo High School (CA)
7	Jonathan Johnson	Texas Rangers	RHP	Florida State
8	Todd Helton	Colorado Rockies	1B	Tennessee
9	Geoff Jenkins	Milwaukee Brewers	OF	USC
10	Chad Hermansen	Pittsburgh Pirates	SS	Green Valley High School (NV)
11	Mike Drumright	Detroit Tigers	RHP	Wichita State
12	Matt Morris	St. Louis Cardinals	RHP	Seton Hall
13	Mark Redman	Minnesota Twins	LHP	Oklahoma
14	Reggie Taylor	Philadelphia Phillies	OF	Newberry High School (SC)
15	Andy Yount	Boston Red Sox	RHP	Kingwood, Texas
16	Joe Fontenot	San Francisco Giants	RHP	Lafayette, Louisiana
17	Roy Halladay	Toronto Blue Jays	RHP	Arvada West High School (CO)
18	Ryan Jaroncyk	New York Mets	SS	Escondido, California
19	Juan Lebron	Kansas City Royals	OF	Arroyo, Puerto Rico
20	David Yocum	Los Angeles Dodgers	LHP	Florida State
21	Alvie Shepherd	Baltimore Orioles	RHP	Nebraska
22	Tony McKnight	Houston Astros	RHP	Texarkana, Arkansas
23	David Miller	Cleveland Indians	1B	Clemson
24	Corey Jenkins	Boston Red Sox	OF	Columbia, South Carolina
25	Jeff Liefer	Chicago White Sox	3B	Long Beach State
26	* Chad Hutchinson	Atlanta Braves	RHP	Encinitas, California
27	Shea Morenz	New York Yankees	OF	Texas
28	Michael Barrett	Montreal Expos	SS	Pace Academy
29	Chris Haas	St. Louis Cardinals	3B	St. Mary's High School
30	Dave Coggin	Philadelphia Phillies	RHP	Upland High School

* Did not sign

== Other notable players ==
- Jarrod Washburn, 2nd round, 31st overall by the California Angels
- Mark Bellhorn, 2nd round, 35th overall by the Oakland Athletics
- Marlon Anderson, 2nd round, 42nd overall by the Philadelphia Phillies
- Craig Wilson, 2nd round, 47th overall by the Toronto Blue Jays
- Carlos Beltrán, 2nd round, 49th overall by the Kansas City Royals
- Sean Casey, 2nd round, 53rd overall by the Cleveland Indians
- Brett Tomko, 2nd round, 54th overall by the Cincinnati Reds
- Randy Winn, 3rd round, 65th overall by the Florida Marlins
- Ryan Dempster, 3rd round, 66th overall by the Texas Rangers
- Bronson Arroyo, 3rd round, 69th overall by the Pittsburgh Pirates
- J.J. Putz, 3rd round, 84th overall by the Chicago White Sox, but did not sign
- Adam Everett, 4th round, 91st overall by the Chicago Cubs, but did not sign
- Russ Ortiz, 4th round, 103rd overall by the San Francisco Giants
- Doug Mientkiewicz, 5th round, 128th overall by the Minnesota Twins
- Jason LaRue, 5th round, 139th overall by the Cincinnati Reds
- Brian Schneider, 5th round, 143rd overall by the Montreal Expos
- Danny Kolb, 6th round, 150th overall by the Texas Rangers
- Joe Nathan, 6th round, 159th overall by the San Francisco Giants
- Craig Monroe, 8th round, 206th overall by the Texas Rangers
- A. J. Burnett, 8th round, 217th overall by the New York Mets
- Ray King, 8th round, 223rd overall by the Cincinnati Reds
- Ryan Freel, 10th round, 272nd overall by the Toronto Blue Jays
- David Dellucci, 10th round, 276th overall by the Baltimore Orioles
- Ted Lilly, 13th round, 356th overall by the Toronto Blue Jays, but did not sign
- Brad Wilkerson, 13th round, 359th overall by the Los Angeles Dodgers, but did not sign
- Mark Hendrickson, 16th round, 434th overall by the Detroit Tigers, but did not sign
- Scott Proctor, 17th round, 469th overall by the New York Mets, but did not sign
- David Ross, 19th round, 527th overall by the Los Angeles Dodgers, but did not sign
- Aaron Miles, 19th round, 529th overall by the Houston Astros
- Mike Lowell, 20th round, 562nd overall by the New York Yankees
- Brian Fuentes, 25th round, 678th overall by the Seattle Mariners
- Matt Thornton, 27th round, 742nd overall by the Detroit Tigers, but did not sign
- Juan Pierre, 30th round, 818th overall by the Seattle Mariners, but did not sign
- Rob Mackowiak, 30th round, 839th overall by the Cincinnati Reds, but did not sign
- Pedro Feliciano, 31st round, 863rd overall by the Los Angeles Dodgers
- Nate Robertson, 35th round, 980th overall by the Chicago White Sox, but did not sign
- D. J. Carrasco, 39th round, 1074th overall by the Texas Rangers, but did not sign
- Mike Lincoln, 40th round, 1111th overall by the San Francisco Giants, but did not sign
- Aaron Rowand, 40th round, 1113th overall by the New York Mets, but did not sign
- Brad Lidge, 42nd round, 1167th overall by the San Francisco Giants, but did not sign
- Jerry Hairston Jr., 42nd round, 1172nd overall by the Baltimore Orioles, but did not sign
- Pat Burrell, 43rd round, 1194th overall by the Boston Red Sox, but did not sign
- Casey Blake, 45th round, 1259th overall by the New York Yankees, but did not sign
- Cliff Politte, 54th round, 1438th overall by the St. Louis Cardinals
- Justin Speier, 55th round, 1452nd overall by the Chicago Cubs
- Mark Mulder, 55th round, 1455th overall by the Detroit Tigers, but did not sign
- Gabe Kapler, 57th round, 1487th overall by the Detroit Tigers
- Kip Wells, 58th round, 1501st overall by the Milwaukee Brewers, but did not sign

=== NFL personnel drafted ===
- Chad Hutchinson, 1st round, 26th overall by the Atlanta Braves, but did not sign
- Ricky Williams, 8th round, 213th overall by the Philadelphia Phillies
- Tom Brady, 18th round, 507th overall by the Montreal Expos, but did not sign
- Lawyer Milloy, 19th round, 518th overall by the Detroit Tigers, but did not sign
- Scott Fitterer, 22nd round, 608th overall by the Toronto Blue Jays
- Danny Kanell, 25th round, 702nd overall by the New York Yankees, but did not sign
- Daunte Culpepper, 26th round, 730th overall by the New York Yankees, but did not sign
- Michael Bishop, 28th round, 782nd overall by the Cleveland Indians, but did not sign

Preceded by Paul Wilson	1st Overall Picks; Darin Erstad	Succeeded by Kris Benson
