= 2000 Detroit Tigers season =

Major League Baseball season

2000 Detroit Tigers
- League: American League
- Division: Central
- Ballpark: Comerica Park
- City: Detroit, Michigan
- Record: 79–83 (.488)
- Divisional place: 3rd
- Owners: Mike Ilitch
- General managers: Randy Smith
- Managers: Phil Garner
- Television: WKBD (Frank Beckmann, Al Kaline); Fox Sports Detroit (Josh Lewin, Kirk Gibson, Tom Paciorek)
- Radio: Detroit Tigers Radio Network (Ernie Harwell, Jim Price, Dan Dickerson)

The 2000 Detroit Tigers season was the team's 100th season and their first season at Comerica Park, after having played at Tiger Stadium since 1912, at the corner of Michigan Avenue and Trumbull Avenue (also site of their previous stadiums since 1896).

== Offseason ==
- November 2, 1999: Juan González was traded by the Texas Rangers with Danny Patterson and Gregg Zaun to the Detroit Tigers for Frank Catalanotto, Francisco Cordero, Bill Haselman, Gabe Kapler, Justin Thompson, and Alan Webb (minors).
- November 15, 1999: Luis Polonia was signed as a free agent with the Detroit Tigers.
- November 29, 1999: Mike Oquist was signed as a free agent with the Detroit Tigers.
- March 7, 2000: Gregg Zaun was sent to the Kansas City Royals by the Detroit Tigers as part of a conditional deal.
- March 13, 2000: Mike Oquist was released by the Detroit Tigers.
- March 26, 2000: Mike Oquist was signed as a free agent with the Detroit Tigers.

== Regular season ==
- On October 1, 2000, Dusty Allen hit a home run in the last at-bat of his career.

Honored 2000 Harry; Heilmann; OF: 1914–29 Heinie; Manush; OF: 1923-27	Honored 2000 Hughie; Jennings; M: 1907–20 Sam; Crawford; OF: 1903-17	Honored 2000 Mickey; Cochrane; C: 1934–37; M: 1934–38; George; Kell; 3B: 1946-52	Honored 2000 Ernie; Harwell; Broadcaster: 1960–2002	Honored 2000

=== Comerica Park ===
Groundbreaking for a new ballpark to replace Tiger Stadium for the Detroit Tigers was held on October 29, 1997, and the new stadium was opened to the public in 2000. At the time of construction, the scoreboard in left field was the largest in Major League Baseball. In December 1998, Comerica Bank agreed to pay US$66 million over 30 years for the naming rights for the new ballpark. Upon its opening, there was some effort to try to find a nickname for the park, with the abbreviation CoPa suggested by many, but that nickname has not gained widespread acceptance.

==== First game ====
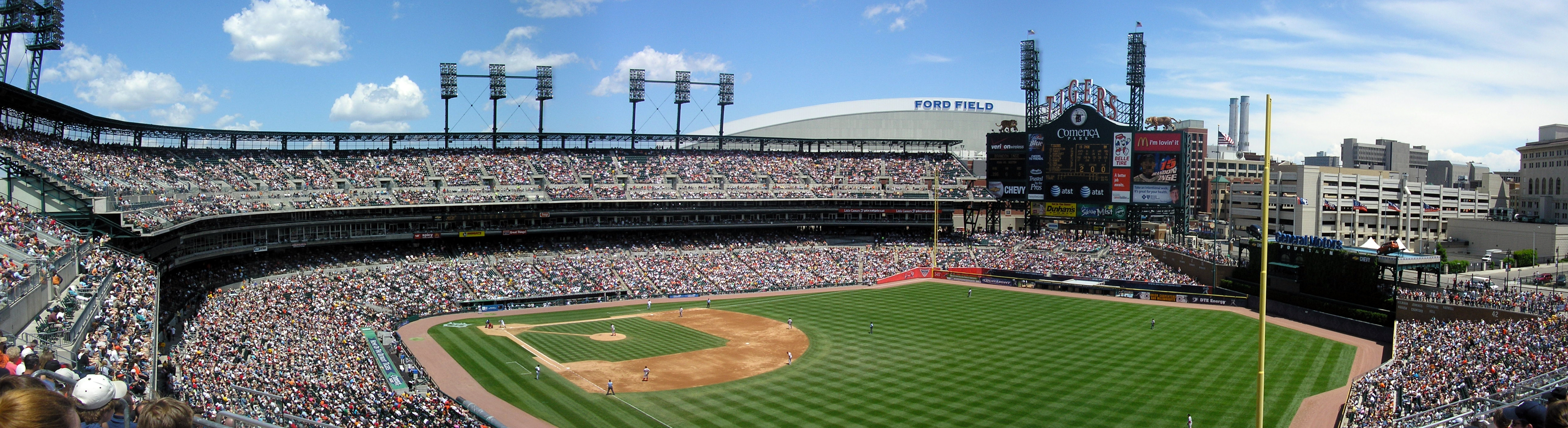
Comerica Park panoramic

The first game at Comerica Park was held on Tuesday, April 11, 2000, with 39,168 spectators attending on a cold snowy afternoon. Grounds people had to clear snow off the field from the night before. The Tigers defeated the Seattle Mariners by a score of 5–2. The winning pitcher, like in the final game at Tiger Stadium was Brian Moehler.

=== April 22 ===
The Tigers were involved in a pair of bench-clearing brawls in a 14–6 loss to the Chicago White Sox at Comiskey Park on April 22. Both were fueled by pitchers hitting batters. The tensions began in the sixth inning with Carlos Lee and Jeff Weaver who continued to jaw with Lee after being subbed out. A retaliatory pitch thrown by Jim Parque to Dean Palmer one inning later in the seventh began the first brawl which moved into shallow right field and included Keith Foulke being punched by Bobby Higginson and sustaining a cut under his left eye that needed five stitches to close. Four batters after Tanyon Sturtze hit Deivi Cruz in the ninth, the second brawl erupted when Bob Howry did likewise to Shane Halter. Among the eleven ejections were the Tigers' Weaver, Palmer, Robert Fick, Danny Patterson and Doug Brocail and White Sox's Sturtze, Howry, Magglio Ordóñez, Bill Simas, manager Jerry Manuel and bench coach Joe Nossek.

In the harshest penalty for a brawl in MLB history, a combined 16 members of the Tigers and White Sox were suspended for a total of 82 games five days later on April 27. Tigers coach Juan Samuel incurred the longest at 15 for throwing punches rather than serving as a peacemaker, while the opposing managers Manuel and Phil Garner each received eight. Palmer was also assessed eight for participating in the second brawl despite having already been ejected. Other suspended Tigers were Higginson and Fick for five each, Brocail for four and Juan Encarnación, Karim García and Luis Polonia for three. Ordóñez was the White Sox player receiving the longest suspension at five, while Lee, Parque, Foulke, Sturtze and Howry got three each.

=== Season standings ===
AL Central
Team	W	L	Pct.	GB	Home	Road
Chicago White Sox	95	67	.586	—	46‍–‍35	49‍–‍32
Cleveland Indians	90	72	.556	5	48‍–‍33	42‍–‍39
Detroit Tigers	79	83	.488	16	43‍–‍38	36‍–‍45
Kansas City Royals	77	85	.475	18	42‍–‍39	35‍–‍46
Minnesota Twins	69	93	.426	26	36‍–‍45	33‍–‍48

=== Record vs. opponents ===
2000 American League record Source: MLB Standings Grid – 2000
Team	ANA	BAL	BOS	CWS	CLE	DET	KC	MIN	NYY	OAK	SEA	TB	TEX	TOR	NL
Anaheim	—	7–5	5–4	4–6	3–6	5–5	6–6	7–3	5–5	5–8	5–8	6–6	7–5	5–7	12–6
Baltimore	5–7	—	5–7	4–6	5–4	6–4	3–7	6–3	5–7	4–8	3–7	8–5	6–6	7–6	7–11
Boston	4–5	7–5	—	7–5	6–6	7–5	4–6	8–2	6–7	5–5	5–5	6–6	7–3	4–8	9–9
Chicago	6–4	6–4	5–7	—	8–5	9–3	5–7	7–5	8–4	6–3	7–5	6–4	5–5	5–5	12–6
Cleveland	6–3	4–5	6–6	5–8	—	6–7	5–7	5–8	5–5	6–6	7–2	8–2	6–4	8–4	13–5
Detroit	5–5	4–6	5–7	3–9	7–6	—	5–7	7–6	8–4	6–4	7–2	4–5	5–5	3–9	10–8
Kansas City	6–6	7–3	6–4	7–5	7–5	7–5	—	7–5	2–8	4–8	4–8	5–5	3–7	4–6	8–10
Minnesota	3–7	3–6	2–8	5–7	8–5	6–7	5–7	—	5–5	5–7	3–9	4–6	8–4	5–4	7–11
New York	5–5	7–5	7–6	4–8	5–5	4–8	8–2	5–5	—	6–3	4–6	6–6	10–2	5–7	11–6
Oakland	8–5	8–4	5–5	3–6	6–6	4–6	8–4	7–5	3–6	—	9–4	7–2	5–7	7–3	11–7
Seattle	8–5	7–3	5–5	5–7	2–7	2–7	8–4	9–3	6–4	4–9	—	9–3	7–5	8–2	11–7
Tampa Bay	6–6	5–8	6–6	4–6	2–8	5–4	5–5	6–4	6–6	2–7	3–9	—	5–7	5–7	9–9
Texas	5–7	6–6	3–7	5–5	4–6	5–5	7–3	4–8	2–10	7–5	5–7	7–5	—	4–6	7–11
Toronto	7–5	6–7	8–4	5–5	4–8	9–3	6–4	4–5	7–5	3–7	2–8	7–5	6–4	—	9–9

=== Notable transactions ===
- May 10, 2000: Rich Becker was signed as a free agent with the Detroit Tigers.
- July 31, 2000: Luis Polonia was released by the Detroit Tigers.

=== Roster ===
2000 Detroit Tigers
Roster
Pitchers: 14 Matt Anderson; 49 Adam Bernero; 20 Willie Blair; 45 Dave Borkowski; 26 Doug Brocail; 40 Nelson Cruz; 35 Erik Hiljus; 46 Mark Johnson; 59 Todd Jones; 41 Masao Kida; 49 Allen McDill; 30 Dave Mlicki; 38 Brian Moehler; 27 C. J. Nitkowski; 23 Hideo Nomo; 56 Danny Patterson; 37 Jim Poole; 55 Sean Runyan; 37 Steve Sparks; 52 Kevin Tolar; 56 Brandon Villafuerte; 36 Jeff Weaver	Catchers: 12 Brad Ausmus; 53 Javier Cardona; Infielders: 22 Dusty Allen; 44 Tony Clark; 8 Deivi Cruz; 9 Damion Easley; 18 Robert Fick; 17 Shane Halter; 21 Gregg Jefferies; 39 José Macías; 25 Hal Morris; 35 Eric Munson; 7 Dean Palmer	Outfielders: 24 Rich Becker; 34 Juan Encarnación; 24 Karim García; 19 Juan González; 4 Bobby Higginson; 54 Rod Lindsey; 29 Wendell Magee; 43 Billy McMillon; 29 Luis Polonia; Other batters: 25 Gabe Alvarez	Manager: 33 Phil Garner; Coaches: 48 Bill Madlock; 32 Doug Mansolino; 15 Bob Melvin; 13 Lance Parrish; 10 Juan Samuel; 31 Dan Warthen

== Player stats ==
= Indicates team leader

=== Batting ===
Note: G = Games played; AB = At bats; H = Hits; Avg. = Batting average; HR = Home runs; RBI = Runs batted in

Player	G	AB	H	Avg.	HR	RBI
Bobby Higginson	154	597	179	.300	30	102
Deivi Cruz	156	583	176	.302	10	82
Juan Encarnación	141	547	158	.289	14	72
Dean Palmer	145	524	134	.256	29	102
Brad Ausmus	150	523	139	.266	7	51
Damion Easley	126	464	120	.259	14	58
Juan González	115	461	133	.289	22	67
Luis Polonia	80	267	73	.273	6	25
Shane Halter	105	238	62	.261	3	27
Rich Becker	92	238	58	.244	7	34
Tony Clark	60	208	57	.274	13	37
Wendell Magee	91	186	51	.274	7	31
José Macías	73	173	44	.254	2	24
Robert Fick	66	163	41	.252	3	22
Gregg Jefferies	41	142	39	.275	2	14
Billy McMillon	46	123	37	.301	4	24
Hal Morris	40	106	33	.311	1	8
Javier Cardona	26	40	7	.175	1	2
Karim García	8	17	3	.176	0	0
Dusty Allen	18	16	7	.438	2	2
Eric Munson	3	5	0	.000	0	1
Rod Lindsey	11	3	1	.333	0	0
Gabe Alvarez	1	1	0	.000	0	0
Pitcher totals	162	19	1	.053	0	0
Team totals	162	5644	1553	.275	177	785

Note: Individual pitchers' batting statistics not included

=== Pitching ===
==== Starting pitchers ====
Note: G = Games pitched; IP = Innings pitched; W = Wins; L = Losses; ERA = Earned run average; SO = Strikeouts

Player	G	IP	W	L	ERA	SO
Jeff Weaver	31	200.0	11	15	4.32	136
Hideo Nomo	32	190.0	8	12	4.74	181
Brian Moehler	29	178.0	12	9	4.50	103
Dave Mlicki	24	119.1	6	11	5.58	57
Steve Sparks	20	104.0	7	5	4.07	53

==== Other pitchers ====
Note: G = Games pitched; IP = Innings pitched; W = Wins; L = Losses; ERA = Earned run average; SO = Strikeouts

Player	G	IP	W	L	ERA	SO
Willie Blair	47	156.2	10	6	4.88	74
C.J. Nitkowski	67	109.2	4	9	5.25	81
Adam Bernero	12	34.1	0	1	4.19	20
Mark Johnson	9	24.0	0	1	7.50	11
Dave Borkowski	2	5.1	0	1	21.94	1

=== Relief pitchers ===
= Indicates league leader

Note: G = Games pitched; IP = Innings pitched; W = Wins; L = Losses; SV = Saves; ERA = Earned run average; SO = Strikeouts

Player	G	IP	W	L	SV	ERA	SO
Todd Jones	67	64.0	2	4	42*	3.52	67
Matt Anderson	69	74.1	3	2	1	4.72	71
Danny Patterson	58	56.2	5	1	0	3.97	29
Doug Brocail	49	50.2	5	4	0	4.09	41
Nelson Cruz	27	41.0	5	2	0	3.07	34
Jim Poole	18	8.2	1	0	0	7.27	5
Allen McDill	13	10.0	0	0	0	7.20	7
Kevin Tolar	5	3.0	0	0	0	3.00	3
Brandon Villafuerte	3	4.1	0	0	0	10.38	1
Erik Hiljus	3	3.2	0	0	0	7.36	2
Sean Runyan	3	3.0	0	0	0	6.00	1
Masao Kida	2	2.2	0	0	0	10.13	0
Shane Halter	1	0.0	0	0	0	----	0
Team Pitching Totals	162	1443.1	79	83	44	4.71	978

- Tied with Derek Lowe (Boston) for league lead

== Farm system ==
Level	Team	League	Manager
AAA	Toledo Mud Hens	International League	Dave Anderson and Glenn Ezell
AA	Jacksonville Suns	Southern League	Gene Roof
A	Lakeland Tigers	Florida State League	Skeeter Barnes
A	West Michigan Whitecaps	Midwest League	Bruce Fields
A-Short Season	Oneonta Tigers	New York–Penn League	Gary Green
Rookie	GCL Tigers	Gulf Coast League	Kevin Bradshaw
