= Eastern League Manager of the Year Award =

- Sport: Baseball
- League: Eastern League
- Awarded for: Best regular-season manager in the Eastern League
- Country: United States; Canada
- Presented by: Eastern League

History
- First award: Frank Lucchesi (1962)
- Most wins: Bill Dancy (2); Brad Komminsk (2); Matt Walbeck (2); Dusty Wathan (2)
- Most recent: Tony Cappuccilli (2026)

The Eastern League Manager of the Year Award is an annual award given to the best manager in Minor League Baseball's Eastern League based on their regular-season performance as voted on by league managers. Broadcasters, Minor League Baseball executives, and members of the media have previously voted as well. Though the league was established in 1938, the award was not created until 1962. After the cancellation of the 2020 season, the league was known as the Double-A Northeast in 2021 before reverting to the Eastern League name in 2022.

Four managers have won the award twice: Bill Dancy, Brad Komminsk, Matt Walbeck, and Dusty Wathan. Wathan won the award in consecutive years (2015 and 2016).

Eight managers from the Reading Fightin Phils have been selected for the Manager of the Year Award, more than any other team in the league, followed by the Akron RubberDucks (5); the Binghamton Rumble Ponies and Harrisburg Senators (4); the Albany-Colonie Yankees, Erie SeaWolves, New Hampshire Fisher Cats, Trenton Thunder, and West Haven Yankees (3); the Chesapeake Baysox, Elmira Pioneers, Glens Falls Tigers, Pittsfield Red Sox, Portland Sea Dogs, and Trois-Rivières Aigles (2); and the Altoona Curve, Binghamton Triplets, Bristol Red Sox, Charleston Indians, Hartford Yard Goats, Holyoke Millers, London Tigers, Lynn Sailors, New Britain Rock Cats, New Haven Ravens, Québec Carnavals, Somerset Patriots, Vermont Mariners, Waterbury Giants, Waterbury Pirates, Williamsport Grays, and York Pirates (1).

Nine managers from the New York Yankees and Philadelphia Phillies Major League Baseball (MLB) organizations have won the award, more than any others, followed the Cleveland Guardians organization (6); the Boston Red Sox and Detroit Tigers organizations (5); the Baltimore Orioles, New York Mets, Pittsburgh Pirates, Toronto Blue Jays, and Washington Nationals organizations (4); the Cincinnati Reds and Seattle Mariners organizations (2); and the Chicago White Sox, Colorado Rockies, Miami Marlins, Milwaukee Brewers, Minnesota Twins, Oakland Athletics, and San Francisco Giants organizations (1).

== Winners ==
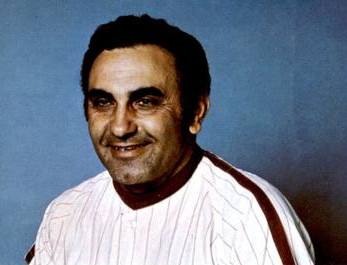
Frank Lucchesi won the first Eastern League Manager of the Year Award in 1962.

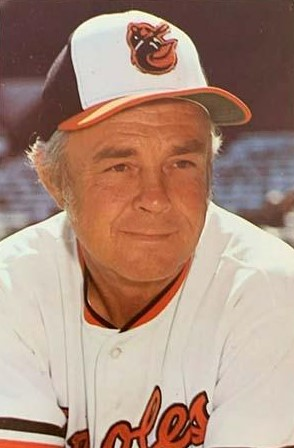
Earl Weaver, the 1964 winner, led the Baltimore Orioles to win the 1970 World Series and was inducted into the Baseball Hall of Fame in 1996.

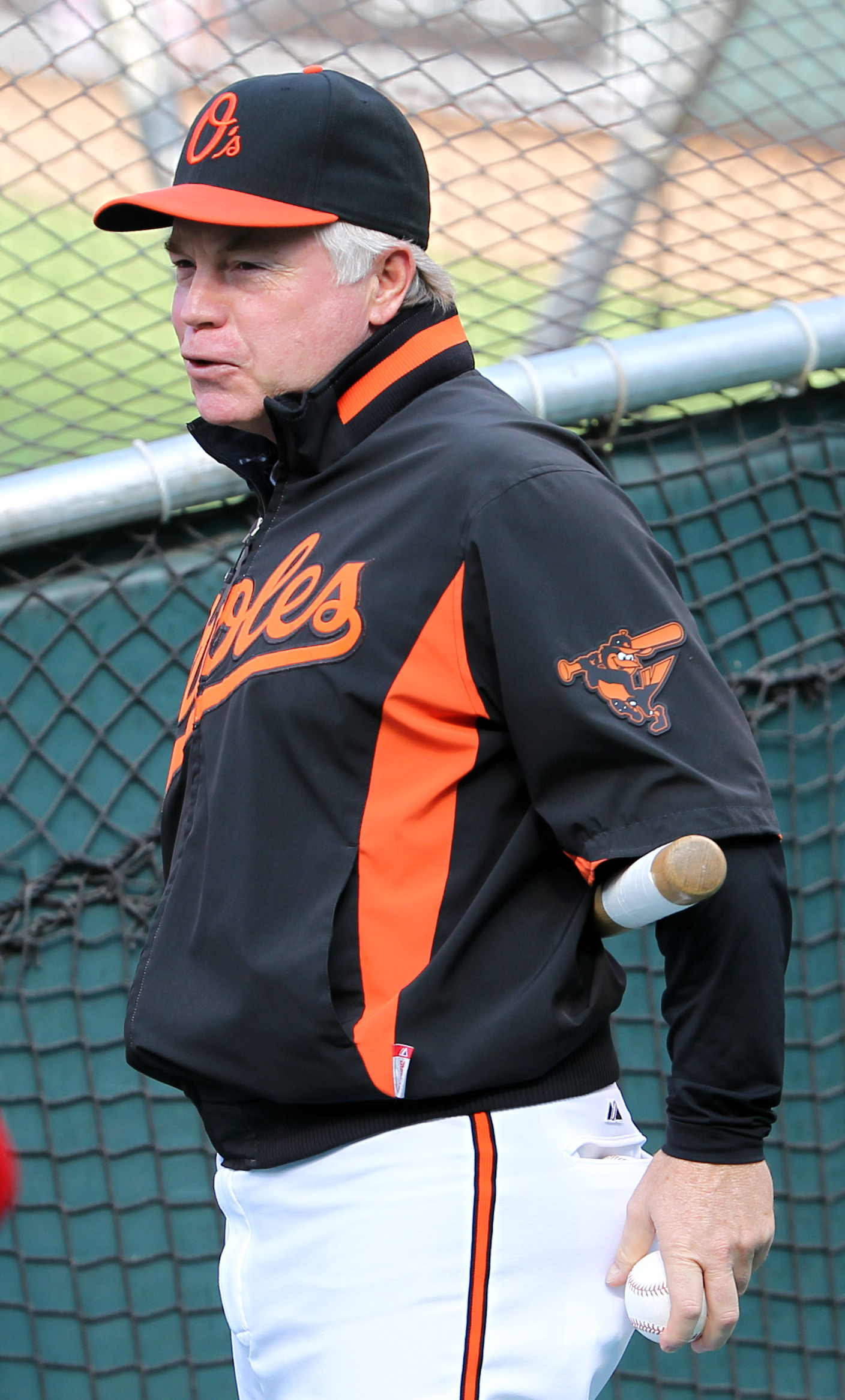
Buck Showalter, the 1989 winner, has been selected four times for Major League Baseball Manager of the Year Awards (1994, 2004, 2014, and 2022).

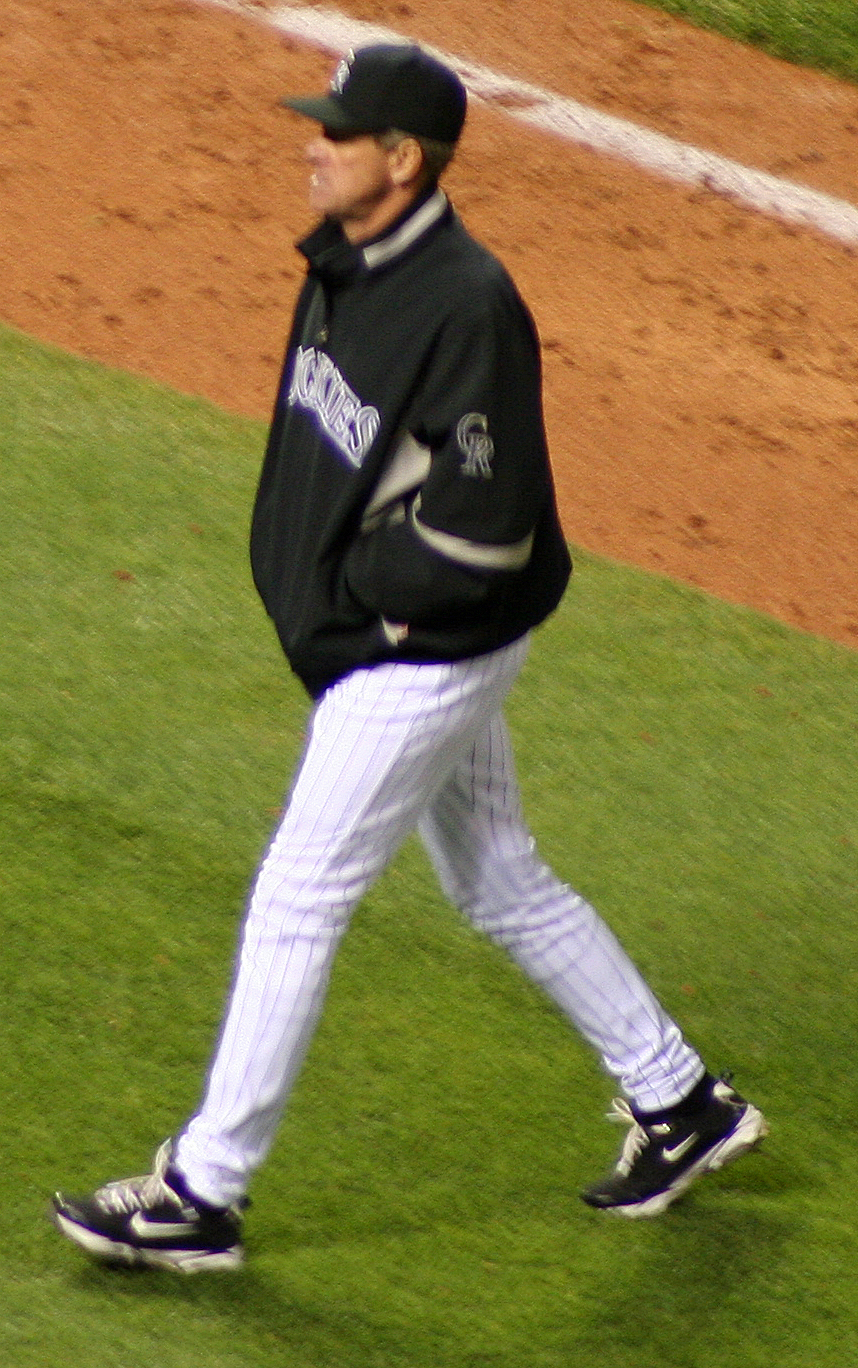
Jim Tracy, who won in 1993, was chosen as the 2009 National League Manager of the Year.

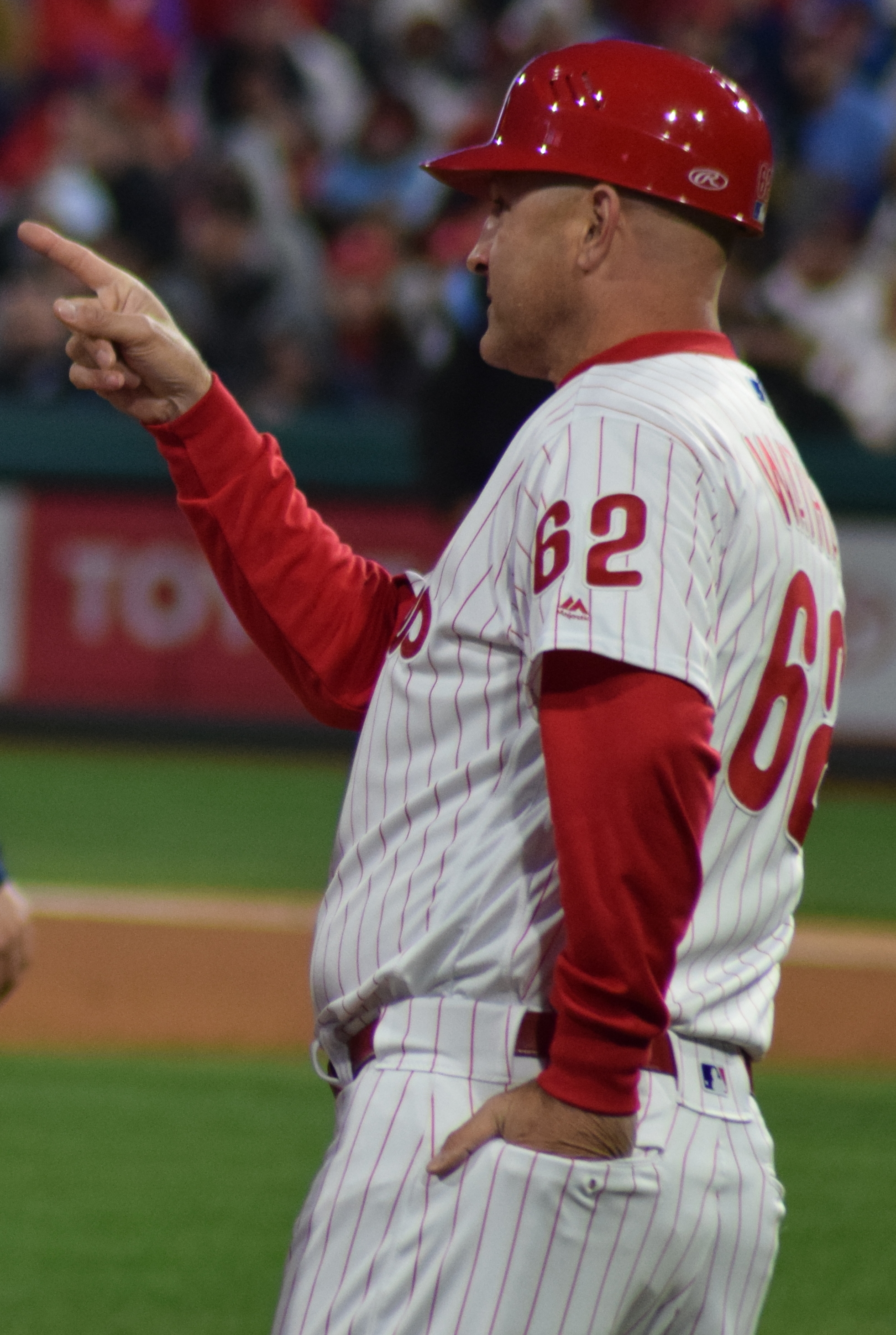
Dusty Wathan won the award back-to-back in 2015 and 2016.

Key
League	The team's final position in the league standings
Division	The team's final position in the divisional standings (Note: Positions are absent from seasons in which the league was not split into divisions.)
Record	The team's wins and losses during the regular season
(#)	Number of wins by managers who won the award multiple times
^	Indicates multiple award winners in the same year
*	Indicates league champions

Winners
Year	Winner	Team	Organization	League	Division	Record	Ref(s).
1962	Frank Lucchesi	Williamsport Grays	Philadelphia Phillies	1st	—	83–57	
1963	Johnny Lipon	Charleston Indians^{*}	Cleveland Indians	1st	—	83–57	
1964	Earl Weaver	Elmira Pioneers^{*}	Baltimore Orioles	1st	—	82–58	
1965	Eddie Popowski	Pittsfield Red Sox^{*}	Boston Red Sox	1st	—	85–55	
1966	Darrell Johnson	Elmira Pioneers^{*}	Baltimore Orioles	1st	—	88–51	
1967	Jack Reed	Binghamton Triplets^{*}	New York Yankees	1st	1st	82–58	
1968	Billy Gardner	Pittsfield Red Sox	Boston Red Sox	1st	—	84–55	
1969	Joe Morgan	York Pirates^{*}	Pittsburgh Pirates	1st	—	89–50	
1970	Red Davis	Waterbury Pirates^{*}	Pittsburgh Pirates	1st	—	79–62	
1971	Jim Snyder	Trois-Rivières Aigles	Cincinnati Reds	1st	1st	78–59	
1972	Karl Kuehl	Québec Carnavals	Montreal Expos	4th	3rd	75–64	
1973	Doc Edwards	West Haven Yankees	New York Yankees	4th	2nd	72–66	
1974	Stan Williams	Bristol Red Sox	Boston Red Sox	1st	1st	74–61	
1975	Bob Wellman	Reading Phillies	Philadelphia Phillies	1st	—	84–53	
1976	Roy Majtyka	Trois-Rivières Aigles	Cincinnati Reds	1st	1st	83–55	
1977^{^}	Mike Ferraro	West Haven Yankees^{*}	New York Yankees	1st	1st	86–52	
1977^{^}	Andy Gilbert	Waterbury Giants	San Francisco Giants	3rd	2nd	77–63	
1978	Lee Elia	Reading Phillies	Philadelphia Phillies	2nd	—	79–57	
1979	Stump Merrill	West Haven Yankees^{*}	New York Yankees	1st	—	83–56	
1980	Lee Sigman	Holyoke Millers^{*}	Milwaukee Brewers	2nd (tie)	1st	78–61	
1981	Jim Mahoney	Glens Falls White Sox	Chicago White Sox	1st	1st	83–52	
1982	Mickey Bowers	Lynn Sailors	Seattle Mariners	2nd	1st	82–57	
1983	Bill Dancy (1)	Reading Phillies	Philadelphia Phillies	1st	—	96–44	
1984	Keith Lieppman	Albany-Colonie A's	Oakland Athletics	1st	—	81–57	
1985	Barry Foote	Albany-Colonie Yankees	New York Yankees	1st	—	82–57	
1986	Bob Schaefer	Glens Falls Tigers	Detroit Tigers	4th	—	67–71	
1987	Dave Trembley	Harrisburg Senators^{*}	Pittsburgh Pirates	2nd	—	77–63	
1988	Rich Morales	Vermont Mariners	Seattle Mariners	2nd	—	79–60	
1989	Buck Showalter	Albany-Colonie Yankees^{*}	New York Yankees	1st	—	92–48	
1990	Chris Chambliss	London Tigers^{*}	Detroit Tigers	2nd	—	76–63	
1991	Mike Quade	Harrisburg Senators	Montreal Expos	1st	—	87–53	
1992	Steve Swisher	Binghamton Mets^{*}	New York Mets	2nd	—	79–59	
1993	Jim Tracy	Harrisburg Senators^{*}	Montreal Expos	1st	—	94–44	
1994	Dave Jauss	Harrisburg Senators	Montreal Expos	1st	1st	88–51	
1995	Bill Dancy (2)	Reading Phillies^{*}	Philadelphia Phillies	3rd (tie)	1st (tie)	73–69	
1996	Carlos Tosca	Portland Sea Dogs	Florida Marlins	2nd	1st	83–58	
1997	Al LeBoeuf	Reading Phillies	Philadelphia Phillies	4th	3rd	74–68	
1998	John Gibbons	Binghamton Mets	New York Mets	2nd	2nd	82–60	
1999	DeMarlo Hale	Trenton Thunder	Boston Red Sox	1st	1st	92–50	
2000	Gary Varsho	Reading Phillies	Philadelphia Phillies	1st	1st	85–57	
2001	Stan Cliburn	New Britain Rock Cats^{*} (Note: New Britain and the Reading Phillies were declared co-champions after the playoffs were cancelled in the wake of the September 11 terrorist attacks.)	Minnesota Twins	1st	1st	87–55	
2002	Brad Komminsk (1)	Akron Aeros	Cleveland Indians	1st	1st	93–48	
2003	Marty Pevey	New Haven Ravens	Toronto Blue Jays	2nd	1st	79–63	
2004	Mike Basso	New Hampshire Fisher Cats^{*}	Toronto Blue Jays	2nd	1st	84–57	
2005	Torey Lovullo	Akron Aeros^{*}	Cleveland Indians	1st	1st	84–58	
2006	Tim Bogar	Akron Aeros	Cleveland Indians	1st	1st	87–55	
2007	Matt Walbeck (1)	Erie SeaWolves	Detroit Tigers	1st	1st	81–59	
2008	Brad Komminsk (2)	Bowie Baysox	Baltimore Orioles	2nd	1st	84–58	
2009	Mike Sarbaugh	Akron Aeros^{*}	Cleveland Indians	1st	1st	89–53	
2010	Matt Walbeck (2)	Altoona Curve^{*}	Pittsburgh Pirates	2nd	1st	82–60	
2011	Sal Fasano	New Hampshire Fisher Cats^{*}	Toronto Blue Jays	2nd	1st	77–65	
2012	Tony Franklin	Trenton Thunder	New York Yankees	2nd	1st	79–63	
2013	Pedro Lopez	Binghamton Mets	New York Mets	1st	1st	86–55	
2014	Billy McMillon	Portland Sea Dogs	Boston Red Sox	1st	1st	88–54	
2015	Dusty Wathan (1)	Reading Fightin Phils	Philadelphia Phillies	1st	1st	80–61	
2016	Dusty Wathan (2)	Reading Fightin Phils	Philadelphia Phillies	1st	1st	89–52	
2017	Bobby Mitchell	Trenton Thunder	New York Yankees	1st	1st	92–48	
2018	John Schneider	New Hampshire Fisher Cats^{*}	Toronto Blue Jays	4th	2nd	76–62	
2019	Buck Britton	Bowie Baysox	Baltimore Orioles	5th	3rd	76–64	
2020	None selected (season cancelled due to COVID-19 pandemic)						
2021	Rouglas Odor	Akron RubberDucks^{*}	Cleveland Indians	1st	1st	73–46	
2022	Dan Fiorito	Somerset Patriots^{*}	New York Yankees	1st	1st	83–53	
2023	Gabe Alvarez	Erie SeaWolves^{*}	Detroit Tigers	3rd	1st	75–62	
2024	Bobby Meacham	Hartford Yard Goats	Colorado Rockies	4th	2nd	76–60	
2025	Reid Brignac	Binghamton Rumble Ponies^{*}	New York Mets	1st	1st	90–46	
2026	Tony Cappuccilli	Erie SeaWolves	Detroit Tigers	1st	1st	79–58	

== Wins by team ==
Active Eastern League teams appear in bold.

Team	Award(s)	Year(s)
**Reading Fightin Phils** (Reading Phillies)	8	1975, 1978, 1983, 1995, 1997, 2000, 2015, 2016
**Akron RubberDucks** (Akron Aeros)	5	2002, 2005, 2006, 2009, 2021
**Binghamton Rumble Ponies** (Binghamton Mets)	4	1992, 1998, 2013, 2025
**Harrisburg Senators**	4	1987, 1991, 1993, 1994
Albany-Colonie Yankees (Albany-Colonie A's)	3	1984, 1985, 1989
**Erie SeaWolves**	3	2007, 2023, 2026
**New Hampshire Fisher Cats**	3	2004, 2011, 2018
Trenton Thunder	3	1999, 2012, 2017
West Haven Yankees	3	1973, 1977, 1979
**Chesapeake Baysox** (Bowie Baysox)	2	2008, 2019
Elmira Pioneers	2	1964, 1966
Glens Falls Tigers (Glens Falls White Sox)	2	1981, 1986
Pittsfield Red Sox	2	1965, 1968
**Portland Sea Dogs**	2	1996, 2014
Trois-Rivières Aigles	2	1971, 1976
**Altoona Curve**	1	2010
Binghamton Triplets	1	1967
Bristol Red Sox	1	1974
Charleston Indians	1	1963
**Hartford Yard Goats**	1	2024
Holyoke Millers	1	1980
London Tigers	1	1990
Lynn Sailors	1	1982
New Britain Rock Cats	1	2001
New Haven Ravens	1	2003
Québec Carnavals	1	1972
**Somerset Patriots**	1	2022
Vermont Mariners	1	1988
Waterbury Giants	1	1977
Waterbury Pirates	1	1970
Williamsport Grays	1	1962
York Pirates	1	1969

== Wins by organization ==
Active Eastern League–Major League Baseball affiliations appear in bold.

Organization	Award(s)	Year(s)
**New York Yankees**	9	1967, 1973, 1977, 1979, 1985, 1989, 2012, 2017, 2022
**Philadelphia Phillies**	9	1962, 1975, 1978, 1983, 1995, 1997, 2000, 2015, 2016
**Cleveland Guardians** (Cleveland Indians)	6	1963, 2002, 2005, 2006, 2009, 2021
**Boston Red Sox**	5	1965, 1968, 1974, 1999, 2014
**Detroit Tigers**	5	1986, 1990, 2007, 2023, 2026
**Baltimore Orioles**	4	1964, 1966, 2008, 2019
**New York Mets**	4	1992, 1998, 2013, 2025
**Pittsburgh Pirates**	4	1969, 1970, 1987, 2010
**Toronto Blue Jays**	4	2003, 2004, 2011, 2018
**Washington Nationals** (Montreal Expos)	4	1972, 1991, 1993, 1994
Cincinnati Reds	2	1971, 1976
Seattle Mariners	2	1982, 1988
Chicago White Sox	1	1981
**Colorado Rockies**	1	2024
Miami Marlins (Florida Marlins)	1	1996
Milwaukee Brewers	1	1980
Minnesota Twins	1	2001
Oakland Athletics	1	1984
**San Francisco Giants**	1	1977
