= Matt Walbeck =

American baseball player (born 1969)

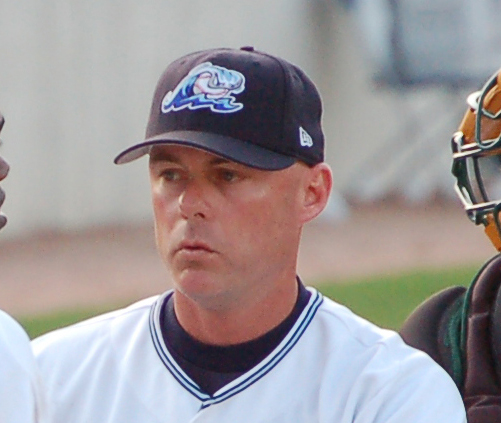
- Catcher
- Born: October 2, 1969 (age 56); Sacramento, California, U.S.
- Batted: Switch Threw: Right

MLB debut
- April 7, 1993, for the Chicago Cubs

Last MLB appearance
- September 28, 2003, for the Detroit Tigers

MLB statistics
- Batting average: .233
- Home runs: 28
- Runs batted in: 208
- Stats at Baseball Reference

Teams
- as player: Chicago Cubs (1993); Minnesota Twins (1994–1996); Detroit Tigers (1997); Anaheim Angels (1998–2000); Philadelphia Phillies (2001); Detroit Tigers (2002–2003); as coach: Texas Rangers (2008)

Matthew Lovick Walbeck (born October 2, 1969) is an American former professional baseball catcher who played in Major League Baseball (MLB) for five different teams, primarily in the American League, from 1993 to 2003. He served as third base coach for the Texas Rangers in 2008.

== Professional career ==
=== The draft and the minor leagues ===
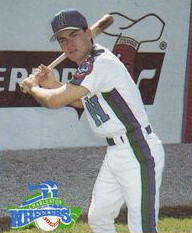
Matt Walbeck, Charleston Wheelers, 1988

Standing at 5 feet 11 inches (1.80 m) tall and weighing 190 pounds (86 kg), Walbeck was selected by the Chicago Cubs 192nd overall (eighth round) in the 1987 MLB draft. Although his professional career started off very well—he hit .314 in 51 games in 1987—he eventually leveled out and become an average hitter. He was not much of a power hitter, nor did he consistently hit for a high average. His best minor-league season was perhaps 1992, when he hit .301 with seven home runs and 42 RBI. He did try stealing bases seven times that year, but was caught each time.

=== The Major Leagues ===
Walbeck made his Major League debut on April 7, 1993, at the age of 23 against the Atlanta Braves. His rookie season would not be very successful; he hit only .200 in 30 at-bats that season. Walbeck hit the first home run of his career that season, off José DeLeón on April 18.

=== To the Twins ===
On November 24, 1993, the Cubs traded Walbeck (with Dave Stevens) to the Twins for pitcher Willie Banks.

Although his 1993 stats were fairly unimpressive, Walbeck was the Twins' primary catcher in 1994 and 1995. In 338 at-bats with the Twins in 1994, he hit .204. On April 27 of that year, he caught Scott Erickson's no-hitter. His batting average was better in 1995; he hit .257 in 393 at-bats. He began the season as the team's starter in 1996, but hit only .223 in 65 games and was replaced by Greg Myers as the starter.

=== Onto the Tigers, Part 1 ===
On December 11, 1996, the Twins traded Walbeck to the Tigers for minor leaguer Brent Stentz. Although Raul Casanova was the everyday starter, Walbeck did see a fair amount of playing time in 1997. In 47 games, he hit .277 with three home runs. He also spent 17 games in the minors, where he hit .305 in 59 at-bats.

=== Off to the Angels ===
On November 20, 1997, the Tigers traded Walbeck with Phil Nevin to the Angels for minor leaguer Nick Skuse.

Mostly used as the team's starter in 1998, Walbeck hit .257 with a career high six home runs (a total that would be matched in 2000).

He appeared in 107 games in 1999, averaging three at-bats a game while platooning with Bengie Molina and Steve Decker. Walbeck hit only .240 in 1999.

In 47 games in 2000, he hit only .199 in 146 at-bats, and lost his starting job to Molina. After the season, Walbeck was granted free-agency.

=== Back to the minors ===
Walbeck-who was signed by the Cincinnati Reds and then purchased by the Phillies in June 2001, playing a total of 107 games in the minors that season. He appeared in only one game for the Phillies in 2001, as a pinch hitter for pitcher Vicente Padilla.

After 2001, he was again granted free agency and signed by the San Diego Padres. Before he could appear in a single regular season game with the Padres, though, he was traded back to the Tigers, on March 22, 2002. He was sent with Damian Jackson for Javier Cardona and minor leaguer Rich Gomez.

He played in 27 games for the Tigers in 2002, batting .235 in 85 at-bats. He spent 21 games in the minors that year, hitting only .213. After the season, he was granted free agency from the Tigers, only to be re-signed by them before the 2003 season.

2003 was Walbeck's final season. In 138 games for the Tigers, he hit a career-low .174 (although he did hit .417 in four games in the minors that year). He played his final game against one of his former teams-the Twins-on September 28, 2003. He replaced A. J. Hinch as a defensive substitution in that game. On September 23 of that year, he had appeared in his final at-bat-he struck out. His final hit, a two-run home run, came on August 8 off pitcher Kenny Rogers.

Overall, he hit .233 with 28 home runs and 208 RBI in his 11-year career. He stole 13 bases and was caught 12 times. In 2109 at-bats (682 games), he walked 133 times and struck out 343 times. Of all catchers with at least 2000 plate appearances from 1990 to 2009, he had the worst career OPS (on-base plus slugging percentage).

== Managerial career ==
After his retirement in 2003, the Detroit Tigers offered him the manager position of their low Class A affiliate, the West Michigan Whitecaps. In his first year, he guided the Whitecaps to the 2004 Midwest League title. The Whitecaps would again win the Midwest League championship in 2006. After the 2006 season, Walbeck left West Michigan to fill the vacant manager position with the Tigers' Class AA affiliate, the Erie SeaWolves, where he was named EL Manager of the Year. Baseball America named Walbeck the 2007 Minor League Manager of the Year, spanning all minor league levels. Additional accolades include 2006 Midwest League Manager of the Year, and Baseball America "Best Tools" Manager in 2005 and 2006.

On November 7, 2007, Walbeck was hired by the Texas Rangers to be their third base coach . In addition to those duties, Walbeck also handled the catchers and coordinated spring training activities. Walbeck was fired at the end of the 2008 season.

On December 19, 2008, Walbeck landed back in the minors, managing the Eastern League Altoona Curve. In 2010, Walbeck's Curve won the EL championship, and he was again named EL Manager of the Year, but the Pirates fired him after the playoffs.

Walbeck was hired to manage the Rome Braves, the class-A affiliate of the Atlanta Braves for the 2011 season, but was fired on July 7, 2011, after compiling one of the worst records in the minor leagues.

== Personal life ==
Walbeck is married to his wife Stephenie and have three children together, son Luke, and daughters Olivia and Tatum. Walbeck's daughter Olivia crowned Miss Oklahoma USA in 2023.
