= Al LeBoeuf =

American baseball coach (born 1960)

- Coach
- Born: February 4, 1960 (age 66); Putnam, Connecticut, U.S.
- Bats: Left Throws: Right
- Stats at Baseball Reference

Teams
- Milwaukee Brewers (2025)

Alan Wayne LeBoeuf (born February 4, 1960) is an American professional baseball coach who most recently served as the hitting coach the Milwaukee Brewers of Major League Baseball (MLB). He played in Minor League Baseball from 1981 to 1988 and was a coach and manager in the minors from 1989 to 2024.

== Career ==
LeBoeuf attended Tourtellotte Memorial High School in North Grosvenordale, Connecticut, graduating in 1979. He then attended Eastern Connecticut State University and played college baseball for the Eastern Connecticut State Warriors. The Philadelphia Phillies selected him in the 28th round of the 1981 Major League Baseball draft. He made his professional debut for the Helena Phillies of the Rookie-level Pioneer League that year. He played in the minor leagues through 1988, when he served as a player-coach.

After his retirement as a player, LeBoeuf became a full-time coach in the minor leagues for the Phillies organization from 1989 to 2000. He was the manager for the Batavia Clippers from 1993 to 1995, the Clearwater Phillies in 1996, and the Reading Phillies from 1997 to 1998. He won the Eastern League Manager of the Year Award in 1997. LeBoeuf then coached in the minor leagues for the New York Mets from 2001 to 2005, the Kansas City Royals in 2006, and the Toronto Blue Jays from 2007 to 2009, before joining the Milwaukee Brewers organization in 2010 as a minor league coach. While recovering from an illness, he worked in the player development department in 2013 before resuming coaching.

The Brewers added LeBoeuf to their major league coaching staff as their lead hitting coach after the 2024 season. On January 5, 2026, it was announced that LeBouef would leave the staff, but would remain in the Brewers organization in an unspecified capacity. On February 4, LeBouef was announced as a special advisor to player development and baseball operations for the organization.

== Personal life ==
LeBoeuf is from Putnam, Connecticut. He and his wife, Laura, married in 1987. They have a son named Mac.

In 2012, LeBoeuf was diagnosed with multiple myeloma, which had progressed into the rare POEMS syndrome. It developed from a bone bruise in his right hip caused by a hit by pitch during the 1985 season that resulted in his body producing too much protein, damaging his antibodies. He underwent chemotherapy and a stem cell transplant and required assistance walking for five years.
