= Reading Fightin Phils =

- Founded in 1967; Reading, Pennsylvania
Team logo
Cap insignia

Minor league affiliations
- Class: Double-A (1967–present)
- League: Eastern League (1967–present)
- Division: Northeast Division

Major league affiliations
- Team: Philadelphia Phillies (1967–present)

Minor league titles
- League titles (5): 1968; 1973; 1995; 2001 (Note: The Reading Phillies were declared co-champions with the New Britain Rock Cats when the championship series was cancelled due to the September 11 attacks.); 2026
- Division titles (5): 1995; 2000; 2015; 2016; 2026
- Second-half titles (1): 2026

Team data
- Name: Reading Fightin Phils (2013–present)
- Previous names: Reading Phillies (1967–2012)
- Colors: Red, nighttime navy, cream, white
- Mascot: Screwball (1988–present); Change-Up the Turtle (2000–present); Blooper the Hound Dog (2000–present); Quack the Duck (2000–present); Bucky the Beaver (2000–present); The Sillie Phillie (1981–1987)
- Ballpark: FirstEnergy Stadium
- Owner/ Operator: Diamond Baseball Holdings
- General manager: Scott Hunsicker
- Manager: Al Pedrique
- Website: milb.com/reading

The Reading Fightin Phils (also called the Reading Fightins) are a Minor League Baseball team based in Reading, Pennsylvania, playing in the Northeast Division of the Eastern League. The team plays their home games at FirstEnergy Stadium. The Reading Fightin Phils were founded in 1967 as the Reading Phillies (commonly referred to as the R-Phils and sometimes Reading Phils) and they have been the Double-A affiliate of the Philadelphia Phillies since 1967. This affiliation is currently tied for the longest affiliation in Minor League Baseball. The Phillies bought the team outright in 2008. Many fans still refer to the team as the Reading Phillies or R-Phils.

The franchise has always been based in Reading and maintained its original name "Reading Phillies" from its establishment in 1967 through 2012. The Reading Fightin Phils are the oldest team in the Eastern League to play in their original and current city with the most seasons under their original name (Reading Phillies).

The Fightin Phils' stadium, FirstEnergy Stadium which was built in 1951 and was previously known as Reading Municipal Memorial Stadium, has been home to the Reading Fightin Phils since their establishment in 1967. The stadium seats 10,000 fans, and on July 3, 2007, the stadium celebrated their ten-millionth fan to attend a game.

The Fightin Phils won the Eastern League championship in 1968, 1973, 1995, and 2026, and were co-champions in 2001. The 1983 Phillies were recognized as one of the 100 greatest minor league teams of all time.

== History of baseball in Reading ==
=== Early baseball in Reading (1858–1932) ===
Reading's first official baseball team, the Reading Athletic Club, formed in November 1858 and, for the next 15 years, played other local teams for unofficial championships and bragging rights.

The Reading Actives date their existence to 1874. After the National Agreement of 1883, which organized major and minor leagues, the Actives became a member of the Interstate Association, one of the two original minor leagues. The Actives went 33–35 in 1883 against teams from Brooklyn, Harrisburg, Pennsylvania, Trenton, New Jersey, Wilmington, Delaware, Pottsville, Pennsylvania, and Camden, New Jersey (which disbanded that July), finishing in third place before the league folded after the season.

In 1884 the Active Club became founding members of the Eastern League of Professional Base Ball Clubs. The Actives played sporadically for the next 12 years.

The Reading Coal Heavers played in the Atlantic League from 1897 until the league disbanded in mid-June 1900. During this time, Lizzie Arlington became the first woman to play for a professional men's baseball team when she pitched the final inning of a game for the Coal Heavers. Baseball returned to Reading in 1907 when the York White Roses of the Class-B Tri-State League relocated and became the Reading Pretzels. In 1911, the Pretzels finished with the best record in the league, but lost a best-of-seven postseason series to the team from Trenton. On June 14 of that season, George "Jake" Northrop pitched the only perfect nine-inning game in Reading baseball history. The Tri-State League folded after the 1914 season, but the Pretzels were resurrected when the Albany Senators of the New York State League relocated to Reading in August 1916. That league folded at the end of 1917 due to the first World War.

Beginning in 1919, Reading played in the Class-AAA International League with the Reading Coal Barons. Several future major leaguers played for the Reading team, owned by the Chicago Cubs from May 1927 until the end of 1930, including shortstop Bill Jurges and pitcher Lon Warneke. In August 1929, George Quellich set a professional baseball record that still stands today by collecting 15 hits in 15 consecutive at-bats.

=== Reading in the Eastern League (1933–1966) ===
Reading became home to the Class-A affiliate of the Boston Red Sox in the New York–Penn League (now the Eastern League) in 1933. The Reading Red Sox had a successful two-year run before the team moved to Allentown (this franchise is now defunct).

Five years later, Reading got another baseball franchise—this time, an unaffiliated team in the Class-B Interstate League called the Reading Chicks, which lost the league title series to the Lancaster Red Roses. In 1941, the Chicks affiliated with the Brooklyn Dodgers as the Reading Brooks, featuring future Dodger outfielder Carl Furillo. The franchise folded after the '41 season, and Reading was without a team for 10 years.

In 1952, the Wilkes-Barre Indians, an affiliate of the Cleveland Indians relocated to Reading to become the Reading Indians. The Reading Indians played at Municipal Memorial Stadium for the next decade, capturing the league title in 1957. Several Indians went on to successful major-league careers, including Rocky Colavito and Roger Maris. The Reading Indians franchise relocated to Charleston, West Virginia in 1961 to become the Charleston Indians, Reading was without professional baseball for that year.

For the 1962 season, the Williamsport Grays moved to Reading and became the second Reading Red Sox team, serving as a Boston Red Sox affiliate for two years, owned by Joe Buzas. The new Reading Red Sox relocated to Pittsfield, Massachusetts, and were renamed Pittsfield Red Sox (this Eastern League franchise was later the New Britain Rock Cats and is now the Hartford Yard Goats).

The Cleveland Indians relocated the Charleston Indians back to Reading after the Reading Red Sox relocated to Pittsfield, the Charleston Indians was once again known as the Reading Indians for one more year before relocating again. Reading was without a baseball team in 1966 before a new Eastern League expansion franchise was established in Reading in 1967 which became known as the Reading Phillies.

=== Reading Phillies/Reading Fightin Phils (1967–present) ===
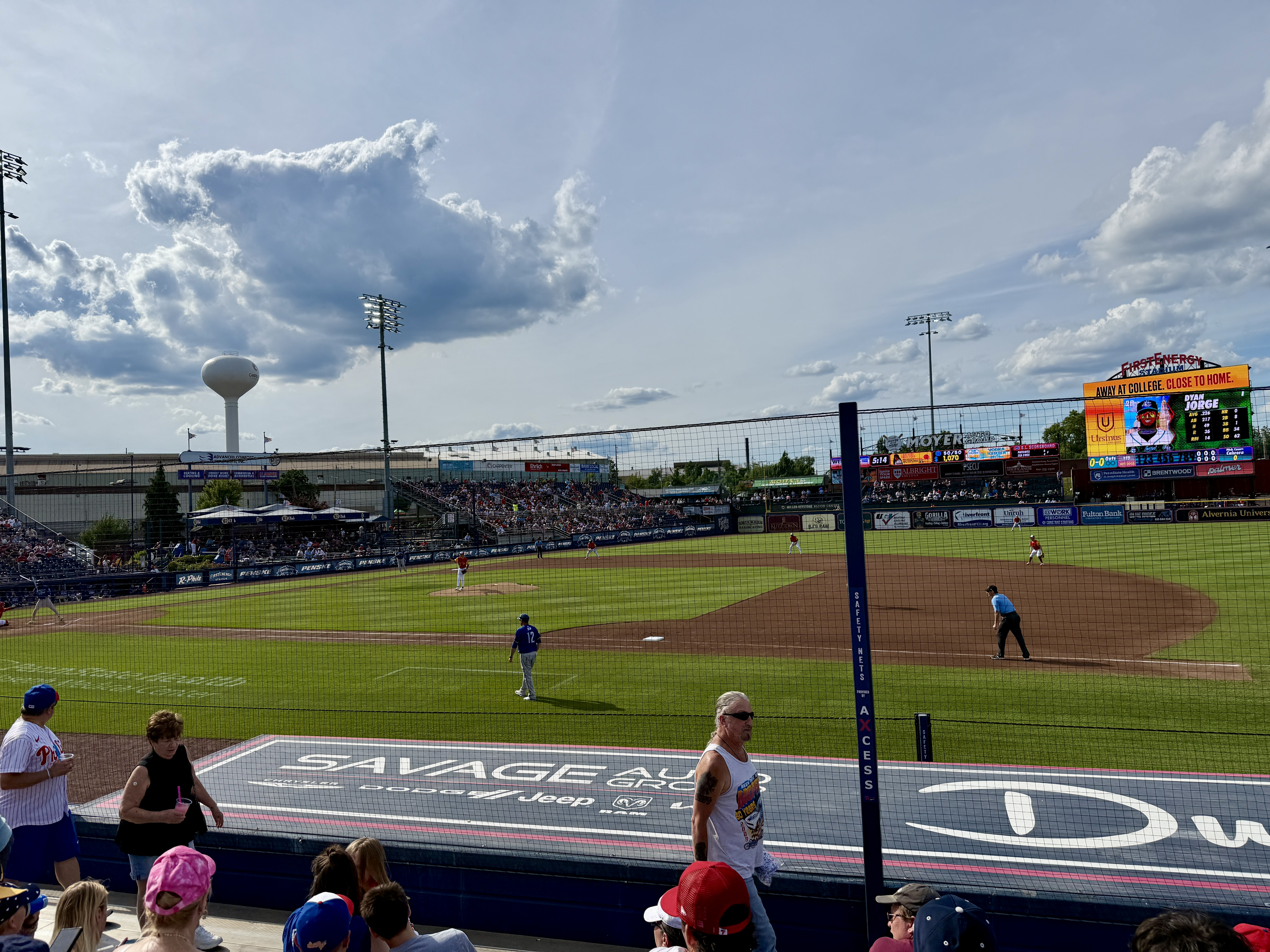
The Fightin Phils play the Hartford Yard Goats at FirstEnergy Stadium on June 21, 2026

The Reading Phillies debuted at Municipal Stadium on April 22, 1967, against the York White Roses.

The Fightin Phils' affiliation with the Big Phils has lasted unbroken since 1967. The Reading Fightin Phils' relationship with the Philadelphia Phillies was solidified even further when the Philadelphia Phillies purchased the then "Reading Phillies" in 2008. With the end of the 53-year relationship between the Baltimore Orioles and their rookie-league team in Bluefield, West Virginia, after the 2010 season, the Reading/Philadelphia partnership became the longest current affiliation in Minor League Baseball (tied with the Lakeland/Detroit affiliation).

On November 4, 2012, news broke that the Reading Phillies would be changing their name. On November 17, 2012, the team announced that its new name would be the Reading Fightin Phils.

In conjunction with Major League Baseball's restructuring of Minor League Baseball in 2021, the team was organized into the Double-A Northeast. In 2022, the Double-A Northeast became known as the Eastern League, the name historically used by the regional circuit prior to the 2021 reorganization.

== Logos and uniforms ==
The team colors of the Reading Fightin Phils are Phillies red, nighttime navy, cream, and white. Their logo consists of a white and gray ostrich outlined in blue with flesh-colored beak and legs putting up his fists in a fighting stance, with the red block "READING" and blue script "Fightin Phils" wordmark right above it. There is also an alternate logo with said ostrich's upper body in a blue circle outlined in red, surrounded by a red burst and "READING" and "PENNSYLVANIA" tilted near the top and bottom, respectively.

The Fightin Phils' home uniforms resemble those of their Philadelphia parent. The caps are navy blue, and feature either a red feathered "R", or the aforementioned ostrich logo without the wordmarks. The home jerseys are cream and have traditional red pinstripes, but are given a faux-flannel look to the design. In the center is the red "Fightin Phils" wordmark with the player's number in red right below it. On the left sleeve is the aforementioned circular alternate logo, with the parent Phillies' red "P" logo on the right sleeve.

The Fightin Phils' road uniforms, on the other hand, carry an almost completely different visual identity. That identity's primary logo (officially an alternate for the team) consists of a hot dog named "Bunbino" inside a bun with muscular arms and wearing a blue baseball cap, a white jersey with pinstripes, yellow wristbands, and a mustard "B" on the chest. In his right arm, Bunbino squeezes a mustard bottle to form a mustard circle inside the surrounding sky blue circle. Inside the mustard circle but surrounding Bunbino, are the words "READING" and "PENNSYLVANIA" as in the ostrich alternate logo, but in a different yellow font, separated by a mustard stain. The caps are sky blue with Bunbino from the aforementioned logo. Like the home white jersey, the road gray jersey is given a faux-flannel effect; it carries blue piping on the chest and sleeves with a mustard script "Baseballtown" wordmark outlined in sky blue and black, with the player's number in sky blue right below it. On the left sleeve is the aforementioned Bunbino primary logo, with the Phillies' "P" on the right sleeve again.

The Fightin Phils have two alternate uniforms, one home and one away. The home alternate cap is navy blue with a white feathered "F" with an ostrich fist serving as the middle stem. The home alternate jersey is navy blue with white undersleeves, carrying the white "Fightins" feathered script and the player's number in white below it; the ostrich is on the left sleeve and the Phillies "P" on the right. The alternate jersey for road and select home games is black with sky blue undersleeves, with the aforementioned "Baseballtown" wordmark on the chest, Bunbino on the left sleeve, and the Phillies "P" on the right. When this jersey is worn on the road, the Fightin Phils will wear a black cap with Bunbino; when at home they will wear a sky blue cap with the mustard "B".

== Season-by-season records ==
- Championship seasons in **bold**
- 1967: 70–69, manager Frank Lucchesi, 6th in Eastern League, 3rd in West Division
- 1968: 81–59, manager Frank Lucchesi, 2nd in EL
- 1969: 81–59, manager Bob Wellman, 2nd in EL
- 1970: 78–63, manager Andy Seminick, 2nd in EL
- 1971: 72–67, manager Nolan Campbell, 2nd in EL, 2nd in National Division
- 1972: 70–69, manager Jim Bunning, 5th in EL, 4th in South Division
- **1973: 76–62, manager Cal Emery, 2nd in EL, 1st in National Division, Won League Championship**
- 1974: 69–66, manager Bob Wellman, 4th in EL, 3rd in National Division
- 1975: 84–53, manager Bob Wellman, 1st in EL
- 1976: 54–82, managers Bob Wellman and Granny Hamner (final 34 games), 7th in EL, 3rd in South Division
- 1977: 63–57, manager Lee Elia, 7th in EL, 3rd in Canadian/American Division
- 1978: 79–57, manager Lee Elia, 2nd in EL
- 1979: 77–61, manager Jim Snyder, 2nd in EL
- 1980: 78–61, manager Ron Clark, T-2nd in EL, 2nd in South Division
- 1981: 76–63, manager Ron Clark, 3rd in EL, 2nd in South Division
- 1982: 63–75, manager John Felske, 5th in EL, 3rd in South Division
- 1983: 96–44, manager Bill Dancy, 1st in EL
- 1984: 56–83, manager Bill Dancy, 8th in EL
- 1985: 58–79, manager Tony Taylor, 8th in EL
- 1986: 77–59, manager George Culver, 1st in EL
- 1987: 76–63, manager George Culver, 3rd in EL
- 1988: 67–69, manager Bill Dancy, 5th in EL
- 1989: 68–71, manager Mike Hart, 4th in EL
- 1990: 55–82, manager Don McCormack, 8th in EL
- 1991: 72–68, manager Don McCormack, 5th in EL
- 1992: 61–77, manager Don McCormack, 6th in EL
- 1993: 62–78, manager Don McCormack, 7th in EL
- 1994: 58–82, manager Bill Dancy, 9th in EL, 4th in South Division
- **1995: 73–69, manager Bill Dancy, T-3rd in EL, T-1st in South; Playoffs: Defeated Trenton 3–0, Defeated New Haven 3–2, Won League Championship**
- 1996: 66–75, manager Bill Robinson, T-7th in EL, 4th in South
- 1997: 74–68, manager Al LeBoeuf, 4th in EL, 3rd in South
- 1998: 56–85, manager Al LeBoeuf, 10th in EL, 5th in South
- 1999: 73–69, manager Gary Varsho, 3rd in EL, 5th in South
- 2000: 85–57, manager Gary Varsho, 1st in EL, 1st in South; Playoffs: Defeated Harrisburg 3–0, lost to New Haven 3–1
- **2001: 77–65, manager Gary Varsho, T-4th in EL, 2nd in South; Playoffs: Defeated Erie 3–1 in semifinals, Declared league co-champions with New Britain when championship series was canceled due to the September 11, 2001 attacks**
- 2002: 76–66, manager Greg Legg, 4th in EL, 3rd in South
- 2003: 62–79, manager Greg Legg, 10th in EL, 5th in South
- 2004: 64–77, manager Greg Legg, 9th in EL, 4th in South
- 2005: 69–73, manager Steve Swisher, 8th in EL, 4th in South
- 2006: 71–69, manager P. J. Forbes, 5th in EL, 3rd in South
- 2007: 70–71, manager P. J. Forbes, 7th in EL, 5th in South
- 2008: 53–89, manager P. J. Forbes, 12th in EL, 6th in South
- 2009: 75–67, manager Steve Roadcap, 3rd in EL, 2nd in South; Playoffs: Lost to Akron 3–0 in semifinals
- 2010: 69–72, manager Steve Roadcap, 8th in EL, 4th in East
- 2011: 74–68, manager Mark Parent (baseball), 5th in EL, 2nd in East; Playoffs: Lost to New Hampshire Fisher Cats 3–1 in semifinals
- 2012: 76–66, manager Dusty Wathan, 4th in EL, 2nd in East; Playoffs: Lost to Trenton Thunder 3–1 in semifinals
- 2013: 62–80, manager Dusty Wathan, 12th in EL, 6th in East
- 2014: 66–76, manager Dusty Wathan, 10th in EL, 6th in East
- 2015: 80–61, manager Dusty Wathan, 1st in EL, 1st in East; Playoffs: Defeated Binghamton Mets 3–0 in semifinals, Lost to Bowie Baysox 3–2 in League Championship
- 2016: 89–52, manager Dusty Wathan, 1st in EL, 1st in East; Playoffs: Lost to Trenton Thunder 3–1 in semifinals
- 2017: 72–68, manager Greg Legg, T-4th in EL, 3rd in East
- 2018: 64–73, manager Greg Legg, 8th in EL, 4th in East
- 2019: 80–59, manager Shawn Williams, 1st in EL, 1st in East; Playoffs: Lost to Trenton Thunder 3–0 in semifinals.
- 2020: MILB season was canceled as the MLB decided not to provide players for the minor leagues in light of COVID-19
- 2021: 48–65, manager Shawn Williams, 10th in Double-A Northeast, 5th in Northeast
- 2022: 61–77, manager Shawn Williams, 9th in EL, 4th in Northeast
- 2023: 59–77, manager Al Pedrique, T-10th in EL, 5th in Northeast
- 2024: 59–78, manager Al Pedrique, 11th in EL, 5th in Northeast
- 2025: 55–81, manager Al Pedrique, 12th in EL, 5th in Northeast
- **2026: 70–67, manager Al Predrique, 5th in EL, 3rd in Northeast; Playoffs: Defeated Hartford Yard Goats 2–0 in semifinals, Defeated Erie SeaWolves 2–0 in League Championship.**

== Roster ==
Reading Fightin Phils roster
Players		Coaches/Other
Pitchers: -- Gabriel Barbosa; 18 Keegan Batka; 49 Cody Bowker; 27 Aaron Combs; 57 Jack Dallas; 33 Ryan Dromboski; 47 Reese Dutton; -- Braeden Fausnaught; 30 Evan Gates; 19 Mavis Graves; 58 Daniel Harper; 29 Estibenzon Jimenez; 12 Christian McGowan; 53 Wesley Moore; 52 Wen-Hui Pan; 28 Luke Russo; 38 Braydon Tucker; 46 Kevin Warunek; 15 Gage Wood	Catchers: 36 Luis Caicuto; 7 Kehden Hettiger; 48 Caleb Ricketts; 53 Guillermo Rosario; Infielders: 5 Carson DeMartini; 10 Aroon Escobar; 3 Aidan Miller; 4 Bryan Rincon; 22 Raider Tello; Outfielders: 23 Raylin Heredia; 0 Austin Murr; 6 Dante Nori; 16 Bryson Ware	Manager: 13 Al Pedrique; Coaches: 35 Brad Bergesen (pitching); 43 Alex Harter (assistant pitching); 40 Jeff Livesey (hitting); 2 Marty Malloy (bench); 11 Nerluis Martinez (coach); 7-day injured list; * On Philadelphia Phillies 40-man roster; ~ Development list; # Rehab assignment; ∞ Reserve list; ‡ Restricted list; § Suspended list; † Temporarily inactive list; Roster updated November 3, 2026; Transactions; → More rosters: MiLB • Eastern League; → Philadelphia Phillies minor league players

== Notable alumni ==
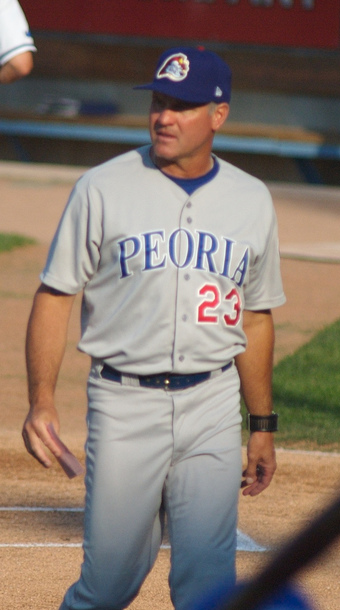
Ryne Sandberg

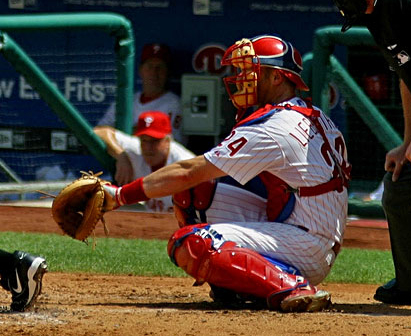
Mike Lieberthal

- Larry Bowa, SS, Philadelphia (1970–81), Chicago Cubs (1982–85), New York Mets (1985), played in 155 games for Reading in 1967–68
- Greg Luzinski, OF, Philadelphia (1970–80), Chicago White Sox (1981–84), played in 141 games for Reading in 1970
- Bob Boone, C, Philadelphia (1972–81), California (1982–88), Kansas City (1989–90), played in 112 games for Reading in 1970–71
- Mike Schmidt, 3B, Philadelphia (1972–89), played in 74 games for Reading in 1971
- Willie Hernández, P, Chicago Cubs (1977–83), Philadelphia (1983), Detroit (1984–89), played for Reading in 1975
- George Bell, LF/OF, Toronto (1981; 1983–90), Chicago Cubs (1991), Chicago White Sox (1992–93), played in 22 games for Reading in 1980
- Mark Davis, P, Philadelphia (1980–81; 1993), San Francisco (1983–87), San Diego (1987–89; 1993–94), Kansas City (1990–92), Atlanta (1992), Milwaukee (1997), played in 28 games for Reading in 1980
- Ryne Sandberg, 2B, Philadelphia (1981), Chicago Cubs (1982–97), played in 129 games (as an SS) for Reading in 1980
- Julio Franco, SS/2B, Philadelphia (1982), Cleveland (1983–88; 1996–97), Texas (1989–93), Chicago White Sox (1994), Milwaukee (1997), Tampa Bay (1999), Atlanta (2001–05; 2007), New York Mets (2006–07), played 139 games for Reading in 1981
- Darren Daulton, C, for Philadelphia (1983; 1985–97), Florida (1997), played in 113 games for Reading in 1983 (and in one rehab game in 1991)
- Juan Samuel, 2B, Philadelphia (1983–89), New York Mets (1989), Los Angeles Dodgers (1990–92), Kansas City (1992; 1995), Cincinnati (1993), Detroit (1994–95), Toronto (1996–98), played in 47 games for Reading in 1983
- Mickey Morandini, 2B, Philadelphia (1990–97; 2000), Chicago Cubs (1998–99), Toronto (2000), played in 48 games for Reading in 1989
- Mike Lieberthal, C, Philadelphia (1994–2006), Los Angeles Dodgers (2007), Gold Glove-winning All Star, played in 86 games for Reading in 1992 (and in 2 rehab games in 2006)
- Scott Rolen, 3B, Philadelphia (1996–2002), St. Louis (2002–07), Toronto (2008–09), Cincinnati (2009–12) played in 81 games for Reading in 1995–96.
- Randy Wolf, P, Philadelphia (1999–2006), Los Angeles Dodgers (2007; 2009), San Diego (2008), Milwaukee (2010–12), Baltimore (2012), Miami (2014), Detroit (2015), played in four games for Reading in 1998 (and in a total of five rehab games)
- Pat Burrell, LF, Philadelphia (2000–08), Tampa Bay (2009–10), San Francisco (2010), played in 117 games for Reading in 1999 (and in 4 rehab games in 2004)
- Jimmy Rollins, SS, Philadelphia (2000–14), Los Angeles Dodgers (2015), Chicago White Sox (2016), played in 133 games for Reading in 1999
- Nick Punto, 2B/SS, Philadelphia (2001–03), Minnesota (2004–10), St. Louis Cardinals (2011), Boston (2012), Los Angeles Dodgers (2012–13), Oakland (2014), played in 121 games for Reading in 2000
- Geoff Geary, P, Philadelphia (2003–07), Houston (2008–09), played in 51 games for Reading in 2000–01 (and in one rehab game in 2005)
- Marlon Byrd, CF, Philadelphia (2000–05; 2014), Washington (2005–06), Texas (2007–09), Chicago Cubs (2010–12), Boston (2012), New York Mets (2013), Pittsburgh (2013), Cincinnati (2015), San Francisco (2015), Cleveland (2016), played in 137 games for Reading in 2001 (and in 3 rehab games in 2003)
- Brett Myers, P, Philadelphia (2002–09), Houston (2010–12), Chicago White Sox (2012), Cleveland (2013), played in 26 games for Reading in 2001
- Carlos Silva, P, Philadelphia (2002–03), Minnesota (2004–07), Seattle (2008–09), Chicago Cubs (2010), played in 28 games for Reading in 2001 (and 2 rehab games in 2002)
- Carlos Ruiz, C, Philadelphia (2006–16), Los Angeles Dodgers (2016), Seattle (2017), played in 153 games for Reading in 2003–04 (and 2 rehab games in 2013).
- Ryan Howard, 1B, Philadelphia (2004–16), played 102 games for Reading in 2004
- Michael Bourn, OF, Philadelphia (2006–07), Houston (2008–11), Atlanta (2011–12; 2015), Cleveland (2013–15), Arizona (2016), Baltimore (2016), played in 215 games for Reading in 2005–06
- Gio González, P, Oakland (2008–11), Washington (2012–18), Milwaukee (2018–19), Chicago White Sox (2020), played in 27 games for Reading in 2005.
- Lou Marson, C, Philadelphia (2008–09), Cleveland (2009–13), played in 94 games for Reading in 2008
- Carlos Carrasco, P, Cleveland (2009–2020), New York Mets (2021–2023), Cleveland (2024), New York Yankees (2025), Atlanta (2025–2026), played in 34 games for Reading in 2007–08.
- Domonic Brown, OF, Philadelphia (2010–15), played in 102 games for Reading in 2009–10.
- Kyle Drabek, P, Toronto (2010–14), Chicago White Sox (2015), Arizona (2016), played in 15 games for Reading in 2009.
- Michael Schwimer, P, Philadelphia (2011–12), played in 37 games for Reading in 2009–10.
- Darin Ruf, DH, Philadelphia Phillies (2012-2016), San Francisco (2020–2022; 2023), New York Mets (2022), Milwaukee (2023), played in 139 games for Reading in 2012.
- Aaron Nola, P, Philadelphia (2015–present), played in 17 games for Reading in 2014–2015.
- Rhys Hoskins, OF/1B, Philadelphia (2017–2022), Milwaukee (2024–2025), Cleveland (2026–present), played in 135 games for Reading in 2016.
- Scott Kingery, 2B/CF, Philadelphia (2018–2022), Los Angeles Angels (2025), Chicago Cubs (2026) played in 106 games for Reading in 2016–2017 (and 3 rehab games in 2019).
- Alec Bohm, 3B/1B, Philadelphia Phillies (2020-present), played in about 62 game for reading in 2019

== See also ==
- Sports in Philadelphia

== Sources ==
- Baseballtown History Book – Reading Fightins.
