= Dan Fiorito =

American baseball coach (born 1990)

New York Yankees – No. 85
- Coach
- Born: August 20, 1990 (age 35); Yonkers, New York, U.S.
- Bats: Right Throws: Right

Teams
- New York Yankees (2026–present)

Daniel Fiorito (born August 20, 1990) is an American baseball coach for the New York Yankees of Major League Baseball (MLB).

Fiorito attended Fordham Preparatory School in the Bronx, and Manhattanville University. He played college baseball for the Manhattanville Valiants. He was not selected in the Major League Baseball draft, but the Yankees signed Fiorito at a tryout in 2012. He played for their minor league affiliates from 2013 to 2016 and was released before the 2017 season.

The Yankees hired Fiorito as a coach for the Pulaski Yankees for the 2017 season. He coached for the Charleston RiverDogs in 2018. The Yankees named him the manager of the Staten Island Yankees for the 2020 season, for the Hudson Valley Renegades for the 2021 season, and for the Somerset Patriots for the 2022 season. He won the Eastern League Manager of the Year Award.

The Yankees promoted Fiorito to the major league team to be their first base coach in 2026.
