= Gabe Alvarez =

Mexican baseball player (born 1974)

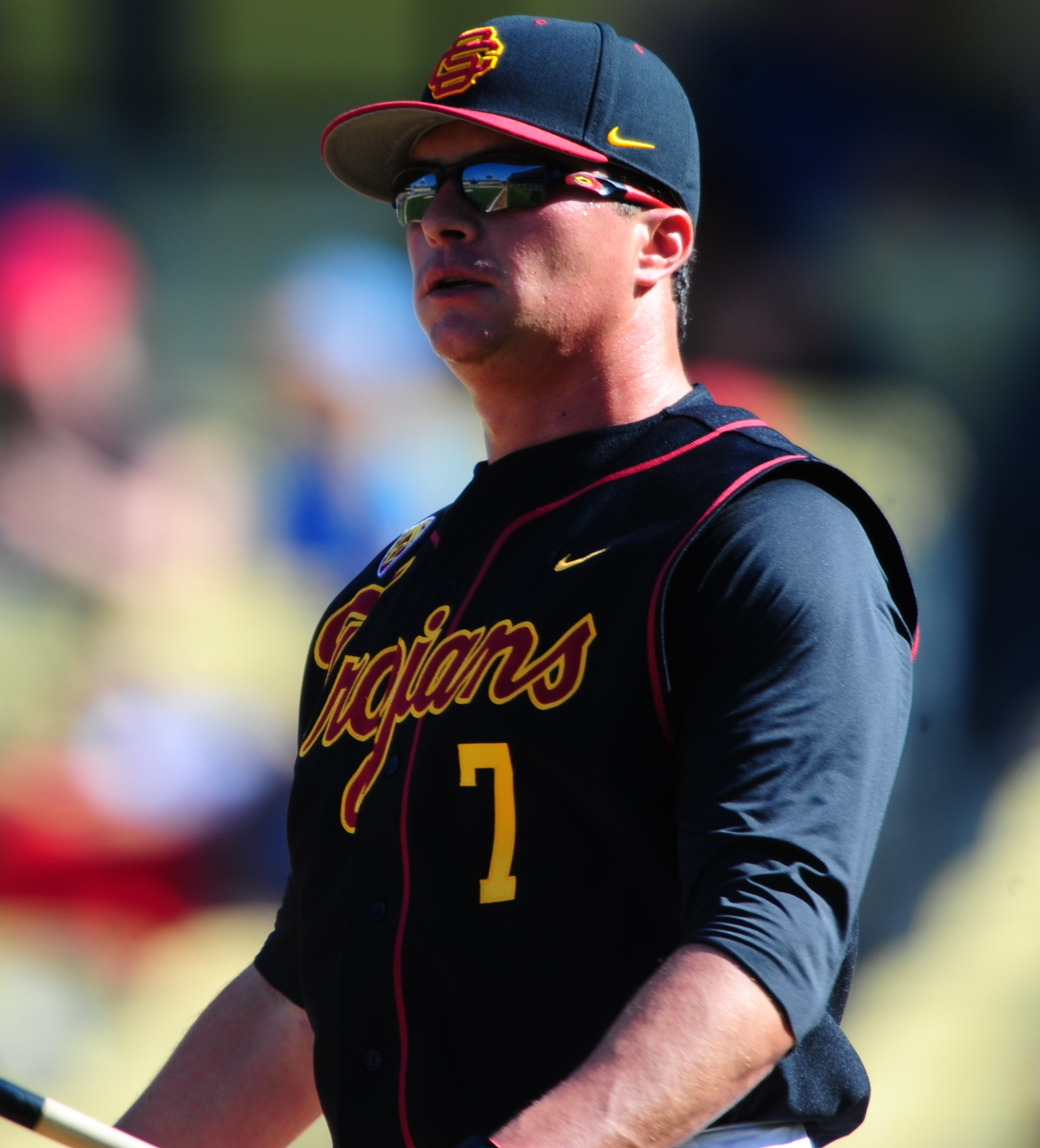
- Alvarez with USC in 2015

El Águila de Veracruz
- Third baseman / Manager
- Born: March 6, 1974 (age 52); Navojoa, Sonora, Mexico
- Batted: Right Threw: Right

MLB debut
- June 22, 1998, for the Detroit Tigers

Last MLB appearance
- September 30, 2000, for the San Diego Padres

MLB statistics
- Batting average: .222
- Home runs: 7
- Runs batted in: 33
- Stats at Baseball Reference

Teams
- Detroit Tigers (1998–2000); San Diego Padres (2000)

Gabriel de Jesus Alvarez (born March 6, 1974) is a Mexican former professional baseball third baseman and coach who currently serves as the manager of El Águila de Veracruz of the Mexican League. He played in Major League Baseball (MLB) for the Detroit Tigers (1998–2000) and San Diego Padres (2000).

== Playing career ==
A 6'1, 205 lbs. right-hander, Alvarez played college baseball at USC from 1993 to 1995 for head coach Mike Gillespie. In 1993 and 1994, he played collegiate summer baseball with the Chatham A's of the Cape Cod Baseball League.

Alvarez was selected by the Padres in the second round of the 1995 MLB draft. While playing in the minor leagues for the Rancho Cucamonga Quakes in 1995, he turned an unassisted triple play as a second baseman. He caught a line drive over second base, stepped on the bag to get one runner and tagged the other one coming into second from first. He told the reporter covering the game that exactly the same thing had happened to him the previous year at USC, but he threw to first instead of tagging the runner to complete the triple play. He said a teammate had pointed out that he had missed a chance at an unassisted triple play, and he had promised himself if it ever happened again, he would do it differently.

Alvarez was taken by the Arizona Diamondbacks as the fifth pick in the 1997 MLB expansion draft, but was traded by the Diamondbacks with Matt Drews and Joe Randa to the Tigers for Travis Fryman. Alvarez made his major league debut for the Tigers on June 22, 1998, going 1–4. On July 17, 2000, he was traded by the Tigers to the Padres for Dusty Allen. He finished his major league career with 59 hits, a .222 batting average, 29 runs, and an .877 fielding percentage.

== Coaching career ==
In 2010, Alvarez became the assistant baseball coach at the University of Southern California (USC).

He was hired by the Detroit Tigers to manage their Double-A affiliate, the Erie SeaWolves of the Eastern League in 2022. Alvarez remained with the team in 2023 and led Erie to win the Eastern League championship. He was also selected as the 2023 Eastern League Manager of the Year. The SeaWolves repeated as Eastern League champs in 2024 with Alvarez as manager.

Alvarez served as the third base coach for the National League team in the 2024 All-Star Futures Game.

On October 31, 2024, Tigers promoted Alvarez to become the new manager for their Triple-A affiliate, the Toledo Mud Hens. On May 5, 2026, Tigers fired Alvarez as the Mud Hens manager due to a violation of club policy, with Mike Hessman will take over as the interim. In his two years as the Mud Hens manager, he had an 84–66 record in 2025 and went 17–16 in 2026 prior to his firing.

On May 25, 2026, Alvarez was appointed as the manager of El Águila de Veracruz of the Mexican League.
