= Rod Lindsey =

American baseball player (born 1976)

- Outfielder
- Born: January 28, 1976; Opelika, Alabama
- Batted: Right Threw: Right

MLB debut
- September 2, 2000, for the Detroit Tigers

Last MLB appearance
- October 1, 2000, for the Detroit Tigers

MLB statistics
- Games played: 11
- At bats: 3
- Hits: 1
- Stats at Baseball Reference

Teams
- Detroit Tigers (2000)

Rodney Lee Lindsey (born January 28, 1976) is a former outfielder in Major League Baseball. He played for the Detroit Tigers.
