= Dusty Allen =

American baseball player (born 1972)

- First baseman
- Born: August 9, 1972 (age 53); Oklahoma City, Oklahoma, U.S.
- Batted: Right Threw: Right

MLB debut
- July 1, 2000, for the San Diego Padres

Last MLB appearance
- October 1, 2000, for the Detroit Tigers

MLB statistics
- Batting average: .250
- Home runs: 2
- Runs batted in: 2
- Stats at Baseball Reference

Teams
- San Diego Padres (2000); Detroit Tigers (2000)

Dustin R. Allen (born August 9, 1972) is an American former Major League Baseball (MLB) player who primarily played first base in 2000. He played for the Detroit Tigers and San Diego Padres.

== Early life ==
Allen was born in Oklahoma City, Oklahoma. He attended Edmond Memorial High School and Stanford University. From 1992 to 1995, Allen played for the Stanford Cardinal baseball team. His highest offensive output came during his freshman season, when Allen batted .296, with 10 home runs and 46 runs batted in. Over his college career, Allen recorded a .270 average, 31 homers, and 181 RBI.

== Professional career ==
=== San Diego Padres (1995–2000) ===
During the 1995 MLB draft, San Diego selected Allen in the 30th round. He made his professional debut that year, appearing in 29 games with the Idaho Falls Braves of the Pioneer League. He also saw action in 36 contests for the Class A Clinton LumberKings of the Midwest League. For season, Allen posted a .292 batting average, 9 home runs, and 55 RBI.

Allen appeared in 77 games with Clinton the following year, batting .267 and tallying 10 homers and 46 RBI. He also played in 55 games with the higher Class A Rancho Cucamonga Quakes of the California League, where he batted .298, with 10 homers and 45 runs batted in. Allen spent the entire 1997 season with the Class AA Mobile BayBears of the Southern League. He batted .253 in 131 games, hitting 17 homers and driving in 75 runs. Allen split 1998 between Mobile and the Class AAA Las Vegas Stars of the Pacific Coast League. He batted .253, with 6 homers and 42 RBI in 42 games with Mobile. With Las Vegas, he saw action in 87 games, recording a .267 average, 16 homers, and 45 runs batted in. He returned to Las Vegas for the 1999 season, appearing in 128 games. He batted .273, hit 18 home runs, and drove in 89 runs.

In 2000, Allen batted .311 in 67 games with Las Vegas, tallying 14 homers and 55 RBI. He joined the Padres during the season and made his MLB debut on July 1. Pinch-hitting against Colorado Rockies pitcher Mike Myers in his first at-bat, Allen lined into a double play. Allen appeared in 9 games for the Padres, going hit-less in 12 at-bats.

=== Detroit Tigers (2000–2001) ===
On July 17, 2000, the Detroit Tigers acquired Allen from San Diego in exchange for Gabe Alvarez. Allen batted .222 in 25 games for Detroit's Class AAA affiliate, the Toledo Mud Hens. His offensive performance improved significantly after he was promoted to Detroit, as he batted .438 (7 for 16) in 18 games with the Tigers. On August 14, Allen recorded his first MLB hit, a double, off Seattle Mariners pitcher Joel Piñeiro. His first MLB home run came on August 29, when he hit a solo homer off Baltimore Orioles pitcher Chuck McElroy. On October 1, Allen homered off Minnesota Twins pitcher Eddie Guardado in what would prove to be his final MLB at-bat.

In 2001, Allen's final professional season, he saw action in 29 games for Toledo. He posted a .218 batting average, 4 home runs, and 11 runs batted in.

== Personal life ==
Allen graduated from Stanford University in 1995, having earned bachelor's degrees in psychology and economics. He is currently the president and CEO of Westgate Business Services.
