= Dusty Wathan =

American baseball player and coach (born 1973)

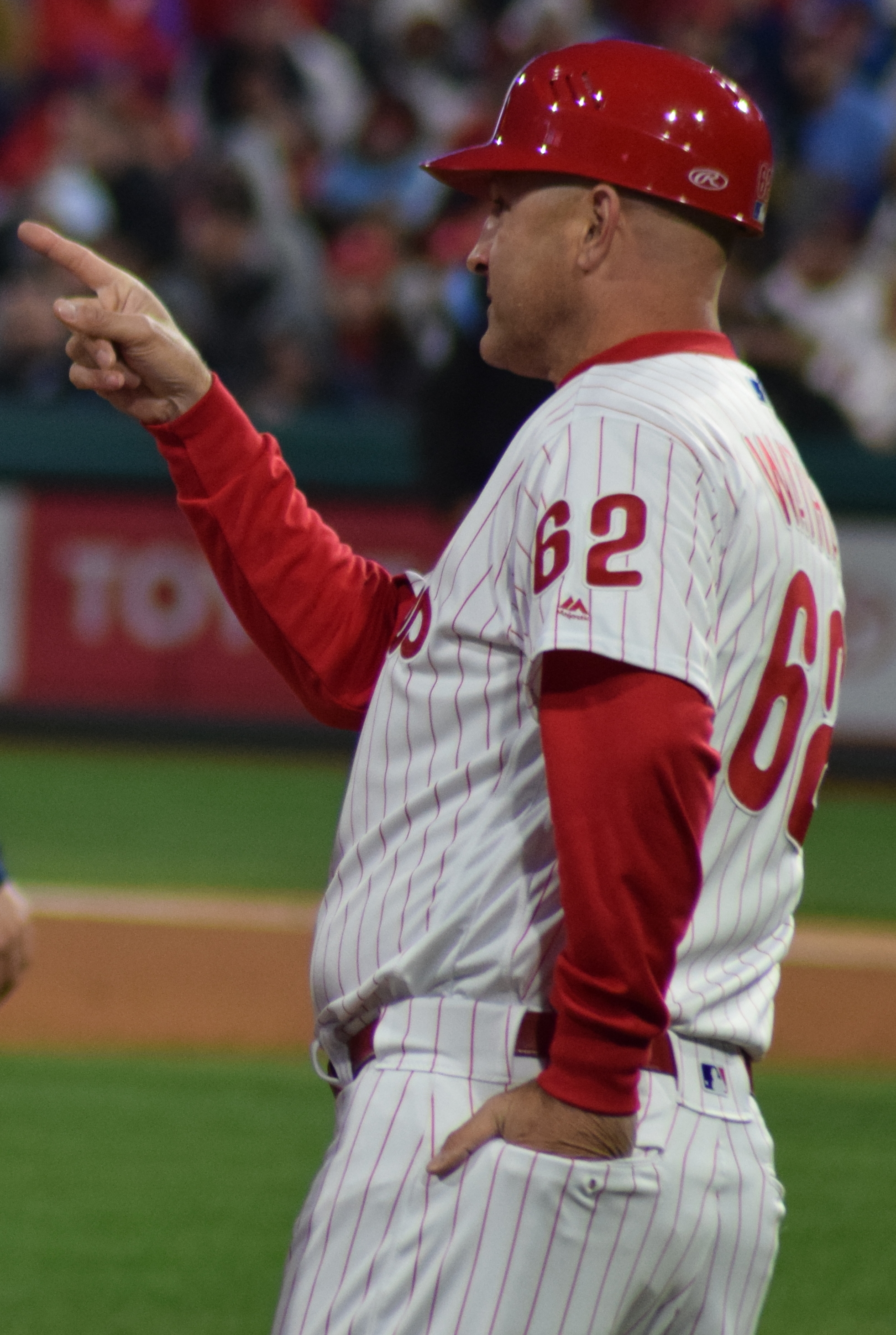
- Wathan with the Phillies in 2019

Philadelphia Phillies – No. 62
- Catcher/ Coach
- Born: August 22, 1973 (age 52); Jacksonville, Florida, U.S.
- Batted: Right Threw: Right

MLB debut
- September 24, 2002, for the Kansas City Royals

Last MLB appearance
- September 29, 2002, for the Kansas City Royals

MLB statistics
- Batting average: .600
- Home runs: 0
- Runs batted in: 1
- Stats at Baseball Reference

Teams
- As player: Kansas City Royals (2002); As coach: Philadelphia Phillies (2018–present)

Dustin James Wathan (born August 22, 1973) is an American former professional catcher who played for the Kansas City Royals of Major League Baseball (MLB) in 2002, and who is currently the bench coach for the Philadelphia Phillies. He is a former manager of the Lehigh Valley IronPigs, the Triple-A affiliate of the Phillies in the International League.

== Early life ==
Wathan was born in Jacksonville, Florida. He attended Blue Springs High School in Blue Springs, Missouri, and Cerritos College in Norwalk, California. In 1994, he played collegiate summer baseball with the Brewster Whitecaps of the Cape Cod Baseball League.

== Baseball career ==
=== Playing career ===
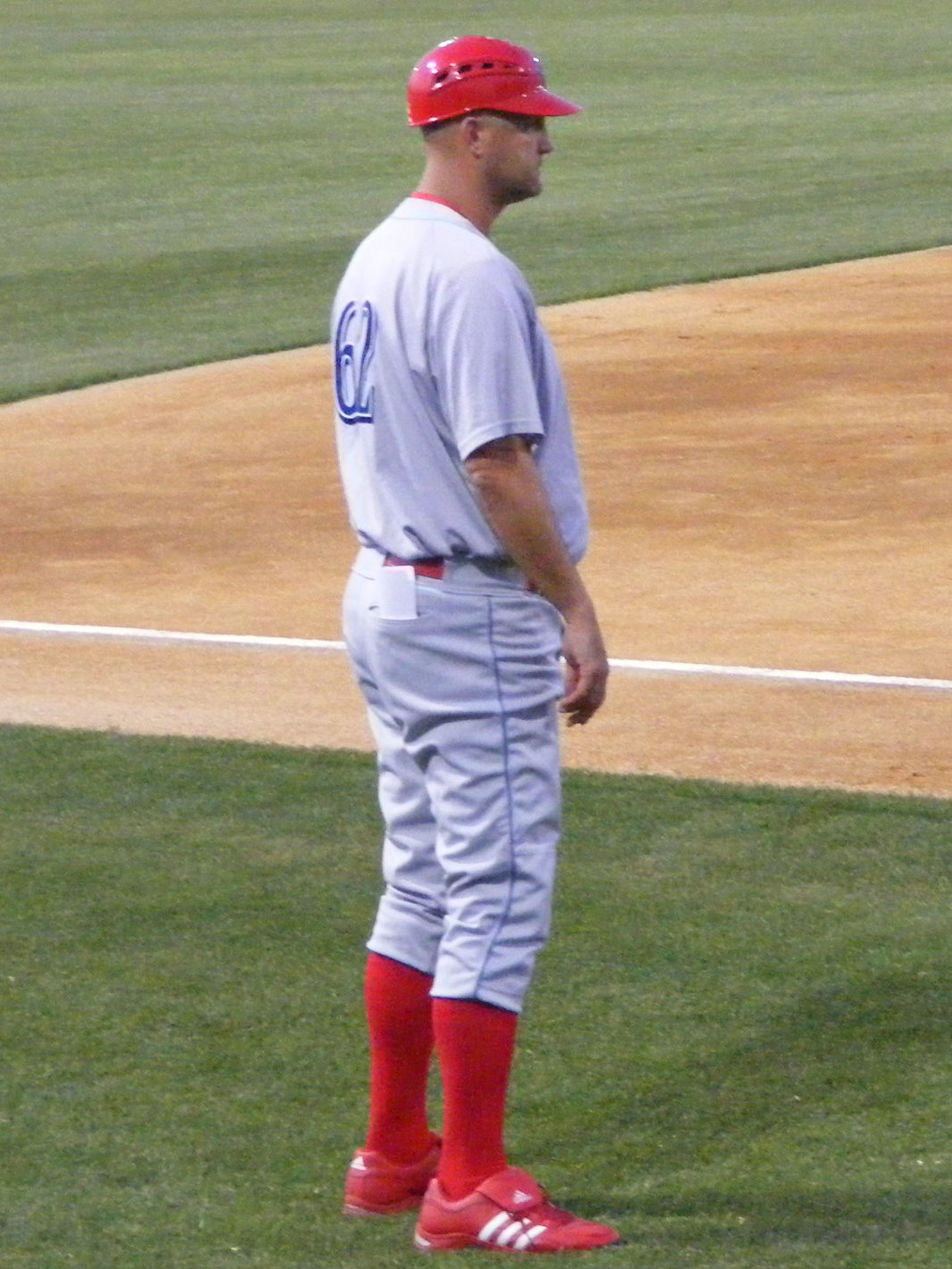
Wathan as manager of the Clearwater Threshers in 2011

Wathan began his minor league playing career in 1994 with the AZL Mariners. In 2004, Wathan was a member of the Buffalo Bisons, where he helped contribute to a Governor's Cup Championship with a 3 run double in the clinching game. In 2007, Wathan was a member of the Philadelphia Phillies organization and played for the Reading Phillies and Ottawa Lynx. He was the final out recorded in Lynx history, after grounding out to end the 2007 Lynx season which would go down as their final campaign. Wathan retired at the end of the 2007 season.

Wathan played 13 seasons in the minor leagues. In 3,216 at bats, he hit .273/.360/.382 with 58 home runs, 24 stolen bases, and 417 RBIs. He played 831 games at catcher, 123 games at first base, five games at third base, and pitched in three games.

In 2002, he played in three games in the major leagues at catcher for the Kansas City Royals, batting 3-for-5.

=== Managerial and coaching career ===
In 2008, Wathan began his managerial career in the Phillies organization with the Williamsport Crosscutters of the Low-A New York–Penn League. He managed the Lakewood BlueClaws (Single-A South Atlantic League) in 2009 to win the league championship. From 2010 to 2011, he led the High-A Clearwater Threshers of the Florida State League. He managed the Double-A Reading Fightin Phils of the Eastern League from 2012 to 2016. On July 22, 2016, he became the winningest manager in team history. Before the 2017 season, he was promoted to manage the Lehigh Valley IronPigs in the Triple-A International League.

On November 10, 2017, Wathan was named the third base coach on new Phillies skipper Gabe Kapler's staff. On October 27, 2022, the Phillies signed Wathan to a multi-year contract extension.

In April 2026, Wathan was promoted from third base coach to bench coach following the firing of manager Rob Thomson.

On May 16, 2026, Wathan managed the Phillies for a game against the Pittsburgh Pirates, as interim manager Don Mattingly left the team to attend his son's college graduation. The Phillies won the game, 6–0.

== Personal life ==
His father is former Major League Baseball player and manager John Wathan. His brother, Derek, played in minor league baseball from 1998 to 2008.

== See also ==
- List of second-generation Major League Baseball players
