= Javier Cardona =

Puerto Rican baseball player (born 1975)

- Catcher
- Born: September 15, 1975 (age 51); Santurce, San Juan, Puerto Rico
- Batted: Right Threw: Right

MLB debut
- May 31, 2000, for the Detroit Tigers

Last MLB appearance
- May 14, 2002, for the San Diego Padres

MLB statistics
- Batting average: .206
- Home runs: 2
- Runs batted in: 14
- Stats at Baseball Reference

Teams
- Detroit Tigers (2000–2001); San Diego Padres (2002)

Javier Peterson Cardona (born September 15, 1975) is a Puerto Rican former Major League Baseball (MLB) catcher. He played in MLB with the Detroit Tigers (2000 to 2001) and the San Diego Padres (2002). In 1999, he was named the Tigers Minor League Player of the Year.

== See also ==
- List of Major League Baseball players from Puerto Rico
