= Bill Dancy =

American baseball player

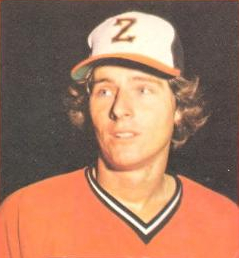
Dancy in 1977 while playing for Águilas del Zulia.

William Woodruff Dancy (born November 10, 1951, at Saint Augustine, Florida) is an American baseball manager and coach. He was third base coach for the Philadelphia Phillies during the 2005 and 2006 seasons. Currently, Dancy is the Minor League Field Coordinator for the Detroit Tigers.

== Baseball career ==
Bill Dancy played for six years in the Phillies minor league system. His achievements include: hitting a home run batting both left-handed and right-handed in a game, batting .311 in one season for a Triple A baseball team, and hitting eight straight pinch hits (occurred during his fifth year).
