= List of NAIA institutions =

The National Association of Intercollegiate Athletics (NAIA) has 233 member colleges and universities for athletic competition in the 2026–27 season.

== NAIA institutions ==
- Note: Non-basketball playing institutions are denoted by *.
- Departing members are highlighted in red.

List of NAIA institutions
School	Nickname	City	State/ province/ territory	Enrollment^{(Fall 2023)}	Conference
Abraham Baldwin Agricultural College	Golden Stallions	Tifton	Georgia	3,768	Southern States Athletic Conference
Andrew College	Fighting Tigers	Cuthbert	Georgia	496	Southern States Athletic Conference
Aquinas College	Saints	Grand Rapids	Michigan	1,295	Wolverine–Hoosier Athletic Conference
Arizona Christian University	Firestorm	Phoenix	Arizona	1,233	Great Southwest Athletic Conference
Arkansas Baptist College	Buffaloes	Little Rock	Arkansas	373	Continental Athletic Conference
Ave Maria University	Gyrenes	Ave Maria	Florida	1,335	Sun Conference
Avila University	Eagles	Kansas City	Missouri	1,733	Kansas Collegiate Athletic Conference
Baker University	Wildcats	Baldwin City	Kansas	1,945	Heart of America Athletic Conference
Bellevue University	Bruins	Bellevue	Nebraska	14,476	Frontier Conference
Benedictine College	Ravens	Atchison	Kansas	2,465	Heart of America Athletic Conference
Benedictine University at Mesa	Redhawks	Mesa	Arizona	2,989	Great Southwest Athletic Conference
Bethany College	Swedes	Lindsborg	Kansas	637	Kansas Collegiate Athletic Conference
Bethel College (KS)	Threshers	North Newton	Kansas	502	Kansas Collegiate Athletic Conference
Bethel University (IN)	Pilots	Mishawaka	Indiana	1,222	Crossroads League
Bethel University (TN)	Wildcats	McKenzie	Tennessee	2,974	Mid-South Conference
Bismarck State College	Mystics	Bismarck	North Dakota	4,065	Frontier Conference
Blue Mountain Christian University	Toppers	Blue Mountain	Mississippi	971	Southern States Athletic Conference
Bluefield University	Rams	Bluefield	Virginia	989	Appalachian Athletic Conference
Brenau University (Note: Women's only institution in undergraduate programs, therefore it does not compete in men's sports.)	Golden Tigers	Gainesville	Georgia	2,420	Appalachian Athletic Conference
Brescia University	Bearcats	Owensboro	Kentucky	638	River States Conference
Brewton–Parker Christian University	Barons	Mount Vernon	Georgia	1,123	Southern States Athletic Conference
Briar Cliff University	Chargers	Sioux City	Iowa	940	Great Plains Athletic Conference
University of British Columbia* (Note: UBC, Trinity Western, and Victoria hold concurrent membership in Canada's governing body for university athletics, U Sports, where their basketball teams compete.)	Thunderbirds	Vancouver	British Columbia	60,863	Cascade Collegiate Conference
Bryan College	Lions	Dayton	Tennessee	1,548	Appalachian Athletic Conference
Bushnell University	Beacons	Eugene	Oregon	758	Cascade Collegiate Conference
Calumet College of St. Joseph (CCSJ)	Crimson Wave	Whiting	Indiana	674	Chicagoland Collegiate Athletic Conference
Campbellsville University	Tigers	Campbellsville	Kentucky	12,451	Mid-South Conference
Carolina University	Bruins	Winston-Salem	North Carolina	893	Continental Athletic Conference (Appalachian Athletic Conference in 2027)
Carroll College	Fighting Saints	Helena	Montana	1,103	Frontier Conference
Central Baptist College	Mustangs	Conway	Arkansas	550	American Midwest Conference
Central Christian College of Kansas	Tigers	McPherson	Kansas	455	Sooner Athletic Conference
Central Methodist University	Eagles	Fayette	Missouri	1,017	Heart of America Athletic Conference
Champion Christian College	Tigers	Hot Springs	Arkansas	146	Continental Athletic Conference (American Midwest Conference in 2027)
Clarke University	Crusaders	Dubuque	Iowa	1,025	Heart of America Athletic Conference
Cleary University	Cougars	Howell	Michigan	1,040	Wolverine–Hoosier Athletic Conference
College of Coastal Georgia	Mariners	Brunswick	Georgia	3,189	Sun Conference
Columbia College (MO)	Cougars	Columbia	Missouri	6,046	American Midwest Conference
Columbia College (SC)	Koalas	Columbia	South Carolina	1,572	Appalachian Athletic Conference
Columbia International University	Rams	Columbia	South Carolina	2,631	Appalachian Athletic Conference
Concordia University–Nebraska	Bulldogs	Seward	Nebraska	3,423	Great Plains Athletic Conference
Corban University	Warriors	Salem	Oregon	866	Cascade Collegiate Conference
Cornerstone University	Golden Eagles	Grand Rapids	Michigan	1,735	Wolverine–Hoosier Athletic Conference
Cottey College	Comets	Nevada	Missouri	266	American Midwest Conference
Crowley's Ridge College	Pioneers	Paragould	Arkansas	225	American Midwest Conference
Culver–Stockton College	Wildcats	Canton	Missouri	1,069	Heart of America Athletic Conference
Cumberland University	Phoenix	Lebanon	Tennessee	3,072	Mid-South Conference
University of the Cumberlands	Patriots	Williamsburg	Kentucky	20,327	Mid-South Conference
Dakota State University	Trojans	Madison	South Dakota	3,508	Frontier Conference
Dakota Wesleyan University	Tigers	Mitchell	South Dakota	886	Great Plains Athletic Conference
Dalton State College	Roadrunners	Dalton	Georgia	4,902	Southern States Athletic Conference
Defiance College	Yellow Jackets and Lady Jackets	Defiance	Ohio	511	Wolverine–Hoosier Athletic Conference
Dickinson State University	Blue Hawks	Dickinson	North Dakota	1,453	Frontier Conference
Dillard University	Bleu Devils & Lady Bleu Devils	New Orleans	Louisiana	1,122	HBCU Athletic Conference
Doane College	Tigers	Crete	Nebraska	1,948	Great Plains Athletic Conference
Dordt University	Defenders	Sioux Center	Iowa	1,929	Great Plains Athletic Conference
Eastern Oregon University	Mountaineers	La Grande	Oregon	2,798	Cascade Collegiate Conference
Embry–Riddle Aeronautical University, Prescott	Eagles	Prescott	Arizona	3,286	Great Southwest Athletic Conference
Evangel University	Valor	Springfield	Missouri	2,157	Kansas Collegiate Athletic Conference
The Evergreen State College	Geoducks	Olympia	Washington	2,320	Cascade Collegiate Conference
Faulkner University	Eagles	Montgomery	Alabama	2,933	Southern States Athletic Conference
Fisher College	Falcons	Boston	Massachusetts	1,501	Continental Athletic Conference
Fisk University	Bulldogs	Nashville	Tennessee	1,005	HBCU Athletic Conference
Florida College	Falcons	Temple Terrace	Florida	657	Continental Athletic Conference
Florida Memorial University	Lions	Miami Gardens	Florida	1,365	Sun Conference
Florida National University	Conquistadors	Miami	Florida	2,638	Continental Athletic Conference
Freed–Hardeman University	Lions	Henderson	Tennessee	2,294	Mid-South Conference
Friends University	Falcons	Wichita	Kansas	1,927	Kansas Collegiate Athletic Conference
Georgetown College	Tigers	Georgetown	Kentucky	1,463	Mid-South Conference
Georgia Gwinnett College	Grizzlies	Lawrenceville	Georgia	11,907	Continental Athletic Conference
Georgia Southern University–East Georgia Campus	Golden Eagles	Swainsboro	Georgia	1,826	Continental Athletic Conference (Southern States Athletic Conference in 2027)
Goshen College	Maple Leafs	Goshen	Indiana	824	Crossroads League
Governors State University	Jaguars	University Park	Illinois	4,337	Chicagoland Collegiate Athletic Conference
Grace College & Seminary	Lancers	Winona Lake	Indiana	2,271	Crossroads League
Graceland University	Yellowjackets	Lamoni	Iowa	1,195	Heart of America Athletic Conference
Grand View University	Vikings	Des Moines	Iowa	1,796	Heart of America Athletic Conference
Hannibal–LaGrange University	Trojans	Hannibal	Missouri	441	American Midwest Conference
Harris–Stowe State University	Hornets	St. Louis	Missouri	1,098	American Midwest Conference
Haskell Indian Nations University	Fighting Indians	Lawrence	Kansas	878	Continental Athletic Conference
Hastings College	Broncos	Hastings	Nebraska	1,011	Great Plains Athletic Conference
University of Health Sciences and Pharmacy in St. Louis (Note: UHSP will merge with Washington University in St. Louis and drop its athletic programs after the 2026–27 academic year.)	Eutectics	St. Louis	Missouri	631	American Midwest Conference
Hesston College	Larks	Hesston	Kansas	308	Continental Athletic Conference
Holy Cross College	Saints	Notre Dame	Indiana	547	Chicagoland Collegiate Athletic Conference
Hope International University	Royals	Fullerton	California	1,140	Great Southwest Athletic Conference
Huntington University	Foresters	Huntington	Indiana	1,504	Crossroads League
Huston–Tillotson University	Rams	Austin	Texas	1,029	HBCU Athletic Conference
College of Idaho	Coyotes	Caldwell	Idaho	1,076	Cascade Collegiate Conference
Indiana Institute of Technology (Indiana Tech)	Warriors	Fort Wayne	Indiana	2,862	Wolverine–Hoosier Athletic Conference
Indiana University Columbus (IU Columbus)	Crimson Pride	Columbus	Indiana	932	River States Conference
Indiana University East (IU East)	Red Wolves	Richmond	Indiana	2,985	River States Conference
Indiana University Kokomo (IU Kokomo)	Cougars	Kokomo	Indiana	2,892	River States Conference
Indiana University Northwest (IU Northwest)	Redhawks	Gary	Indiana	3,045	Chicagoland Collegiate Athletic Conference
Indiana University South Bend (IU South Bend)	Titans	South Bend	Indiana	4,446	Chicagoland Collegiate Athletic Conference
Indiana University Southeast (IU Southeast or IUS)	Grenadiers	New Albany	Indiana	3,752	River States Conference
Indiana Wesleyan University	Wildcats	Marion	Indiana	2,207	Crossroads League
Jarvis Christian University	Bulldogs	Hawkins	Texas	800	HBCU Athletic Conference
John Brown University	Golden Eagles	Siloam Springs	Arkansas	2,341	Sooner Athletic Conference
Johnson University	Royals	Kimberlin Heights	Tennessee	950	Appalachian Athletic Conference
Judson University	Eagles	Elgin	Illinois	1,058	Chicagoland Collegiate Athletic Conference
Kansas Wesleyan University	Coyotes	Salina	Kansas	951	Kansas Collegiate Athletic Conference
Keiser University	Seahawks	West Palm Beach	Florida	20,102	Sun Conference
Kentucky Christian University	Knights	Grayson	Kentucky	541	River States Conference
La Sierra University	Golden Eagles	Riverside	California	1,611	Great Southwest Athletic Conference
Langston University	Lions	Langston	Oklahoma	1,910	Sooner Athletic Conference
Lawrence Technological University (Lawrence Tech)	Blue Devils	Southfield	Michigan	3,260	Wolverine–Hoosier Athletic Conference
Lewis–Clark State College	Warriors	Lewiston	Idaho	3,706	Cascade Collegiate Conference
Life University	Eagles	Marietta	Georgia	2,711	Southern States Athletic Conference
Life Pacific University	Warriors	San Dimas	California	504	Great Southwest Athletic Conference
Lindsey Wilson University	Blue Raiders	Columbia	Kentucky	4,055	Mid-South Conference
Louisiana Christian University	Wildcats	Pineville	Louisiana	950	Red River Athletic Conference
Louisiana State University at Alexandria (LSU Alexandria)	Generals	Alexandria	Louisiana	5,330	Red River Athletic Conference
Louisiana State University in Shreveport (LSU Shreveport)	Pilots & Lady Pilots	Shreveport	Louisiana	9,736	Red River Athletic Conference
Loyola University New Orleans (Note: Loyola New Orleans will start a transition to NCAA Division II no later than July 2027, joining the Gulf South Conference, pending NCAA approval.)	Wolf Pack	New Orleans	Louisiana	4,351	Southern States Athletic Conference
Madonna University	Crusaders	Livonia	Michigan	2,054	Wolverine–Hoosier Athletic Conference
Marian University	Knights	Indianapolis	Indiana	3,586	Crossroads League
The Master's University	Mustangs	Santa Clarita	California	2,799	Great Southwest Athletic Conference
Mayville State University	Comets	Mayville	North Dakota	1,025	Frontier Conference
McPherson College	Bulldogs	McPherson	Kansas	788	Kansas Collegiate Athletic Conference
University of Michigan–Dearborn	Wolverines	Dearborn	Michigan	8,035	Wolverine–Hoosier Athletic Conference
Mid-America Christian University	Evangels	Oklahoma City	Oklahoma	2,183	Sooner Athletic Conference
MidAmerica Nazarene University	Pioneers	Olathe	Kansas	1,539	Heart of America Athletic Conference
Midland University	Warriors	Fremont	Nebraska	1,557	Great Plains Athletic Conference
Midway University	Eagles	Midway	Kentucky	1,945	River States Conference
Milligan University	Buffaloes	Elizabethton	Tennessee	1,200	Appalachian Athletic Conference
Mission University	Patriots	Springfield	Missouri	377	American Midwest Conference
Missouri Baptist University	Spartans	St. Louis	Missouri	5,641	Heart of America Athletic Conference
Missouri Valley University	Vikings	Marshall	Missouri	1,619	Heart of America Athletic Conference
University of Mobile	Rams	Prichard	Alabama	1,911	Southern States Athletic Conference
Montana State University–Northern	Lights and Skylights	Havre	Montana	1,021	Frontier Conference
Montana Technological University (Montana Tech)	Orediggers	Butte	Montana	1,622	Frontier Conference
University of Montana–Western	Bulldogs	Dillon	Montana	1,458	Frontier Conference
Montreat College	Cavaliers	Montreat	North Carolina	932	Appalachian Athletic Conference
Morningside University	Mustangs	Sioux City	Iowa	2,158	Great Plains Athletic Conference
Morris College	Hornets	Sumter	South Carolina	421	Continental Athletic Conference
Mount Marty University	Lancers	Yankton	South Dakota	1,314	Great Plains Athletic Conference
Mount Mary University	Blue Angels	Milwaukee	Wisconsin	1,224	Chicagoland Collegiate Athletic Conference
Mount Mercy University	Mustangs	Cedar Rapids	Iowa	1,451	Heart of America Athletic Conference
Mount Vernon Nazarene University	Cougars	Mount Vernon	Ohio	1,845	Crossroads League
Nelson University	Lions	Waxahachie	Texas	1,725	Sooner Athletic Conference
Nevada State University*	Scorpions	Henderson	Nevada	7,529	Great Southwest Athletic Conference
New College of Florida	Mighty Banyans	Sarasota	Florida	732	Sun Conference
North American University	Stallions	Stafford	Texas	923	Red River Athletic Conference
University of North Texas at Dallas	Trailblazers	Dallas	Texas	3,797	Red River Athletic Conference
Northern New Mexico College	Eagles	Española	New Mexico	1,310	California Pacific Conference (Note: The California Pacific Conference will disband following the 2026–27 athletic season.)
Northwest University	Eagles	Kirkland	Washington	999	Cascade Collegiate Conference
Northwestern College	Red Raiders	Orange City	Iowa	1,665	Great Plains Athletic Conference
University of Northwestern Ohio (UNOH)	Racers	Lima	Ohio	2,606	Wolverine–Hoosier Athletic Conference
Oakwood University	Ambassadors & Lady Ambassadors	Huntsville	Alabama	1,319	HBCU Athletic Conference
Oklahoma City University	Stars	Oklahoma City	Oklahoma	2,763	Sooner Athletic Conference
Oklahoma Panhandle State University	Aggies	Goodwell	Oklahoma	1,071	Sooner Athletic Conference
Oklahoma Wesleyan University	Eagles	Bartlesville	Oklahoma	947	Kansas Collegiate Athletic Conference
Olivet Nazarene University	Tigers	Bourbonnais	Illinois	3,275	Chicagoland Collegiate Athletic Conference
Oregon Institute of Technology (Oregon Tech)	Owls	Klamath Falls	Oregon	5,103	Cascade Collegiate Conference
Ottawa University	Braves	Ottawa	Kansas	1,055	Kansas Collegiate Athletic Conference
Ottawa University Arizona (OUAZ)	Spirit	Surprise	Arizona	836	Great Southwest Athletic Conference
Our Lady of the Lake University	Saints	San Antonio	Texas	2,096	Red River Athletic Conference
College of the Ozarks	Bobcats	Point Lookout	Missouri	1,427	Sooner Athletic Conference
Pacific Union College	Pioneers	Angwin	California	938	California Pacific Conference
Park University	Pirates	Parkville	Missouri	6,634 (Note: Combined enrollment of both campuses.)	Heart of America Athletic Conference
Park University Gilbert	Buccaneers	Gilbert	Arizona	6,634	Great Southwest Athletic Conference
Paul Quinn College	Tigers	Dallas	Texas	602	HBCU Athletic Conference
Peru State College	Bobcats	Peru	Nebraska	1,638	Heart of America Athletic Conference
Philander Smith University	Panthers	Little Rock	Arkansas	866	HBCU Athletic Conference
University of Pikeville	Bears	Pikeville	Kentucky	2,610	Appalachian Athletic Conference
Point University	Skyhawks	West Point	Georgia	2,827	Southern States Athletic Conference
University of Providence (Note: Providence will cease operations after the 2026–27 academic year.)	Argonauts	Great Falls	Montana	677	Frontier Conference
Reinhardt University	Eagles	Waleska	Georgia	1,170	Appalachian Athletic Conference
University of Rio Grande	RedStorm	Rio Grande	Ohio	2,168	River States Conference
Rochester Christian University	Warriors	Rochester	Michigan	1,170	Wolverine–Hoosier Athletic Conference
Rocky Mountain College	Battlin' Bears	Billings	Montana	991	Frontier Conference
Rust College	Bearcats	Holly Springs	Mississippi	429	HBCU Athletic Conference
St. Ambrose University	Fighting Bees & Queen Bees	Davenport	Iowa	2,703	Heart of America Athletic Conference
University of St. Francis	Fighting Saints	Joliet	Illinois	3,185	Chicagoland Collegiate Athletic Conference
University of Saint Francis	Cougars	Fort Wayne	Indiana	1,852	Crossroads League
University of Saint Mary	Spires	Leavenworth	Kansas	1,414	Kansas Collegiate Athletic Conference
College of Saint Mary	Flames	Omaha	Nebraska	733	Great Plains Athletic Conference
Saint Mary-of-the-Woods College (SMWC)	Pomeroys	Saint Mary's	Indiana	1,227	River States Conference
St. Thomas University	Bobcats	Miami Gardens	Florida	6,455	Sun Conference
Saint Xavier University	Cougars	Chicago	Illinois	3,457	Chicagoland Collegiate Athletic Conference
Savannah College of Art and Design*	Bees	Savannah	Georgia	17,575	Sun Conference
University of Science and Arts of Oklahoma	Drovers	Chickasha	Oklahoma	914	Sooner Athletic Conference
Simpson University	Red Hawks	Redding	California	907	California Pacific Conference (Cascade Collegiate Conference in 2027)
Soka University of America*	Lions	Aliso Viejo	California	476	Great Southwest Athletic Conference
Southeastern University	Fire	Lakeland	Florida	10,400	Sun Conference
Southern University at New Orleans (SUNO)	Knights and Lady Knights	New Orleans	Louisiana	2,059	HBCU Athletic Conference
Southern Oregon University	Raiders	Ashland	Oregon	5,371	Cascade Collegiate Conference
University of the Southwest	Mustangs	Hobbs	New Mexico	1,034	Red River Athletic Conference
Southwestern College	Moundbuilders	Winfield	Kansas	1,139	Kansas Collegiate Athletic Conference
Southwestern Christian University	Eagles	Bethany	Oklahoma	364	Sooner Athletic Conference
Spartanburg Methodist College	Pioneers	Saxon	South Carolina	1,029	Appalachian Athletic Conference
Spring Arbor University	Cougars	Spring Arbor	Michigan	2,390	Crossroads League
Stanton University	Elks	Anaheim	California	404	California Pacific Conference
Stephens College	Stars	Columbia	Missouri	532	American Midwest Conference
Sterling College	Warriors	Sterling	Kansas	707	Kansas Collegiate Athletic Conference
Stillman College	Tigers	Tuscaloosa	Alabama	779	HBCU Athletic Conference
Tabor College	Bluejays	Hillsboro	Kansas	664	Kansas Collegiate Athletic Conference
Talladega College	Tornadoes	Talladega	Alabama	837	HBCU Athletic Conference
Taylor University	Trojans	Upland	Indiana	2,398	Crossroads League
University of Tennessee Southern (UT Southern)	FireHawks	Pulaski	Tennessee	978	Southern States Athletic Conference
Tennessee Wesleyan University	Bulldogs	Athens	Tennessee	1,074	Appalachian Athletic Conference
Texas A&M University–San Antonio	Jaguars	San Antonio	Texas	7,584	Red River Athletic Conference
Texas A&M University–Texarkana (Note: Texas A&M-Texarkana will start a transition to NCAA Division II no later than July 2027, joining the Lone Star Conference.)	Eagles	Texarkana	Texas	2,109	Red River Athletic Conference
Texas A&M University–Victoria*	Jaguars	Victoria	Texas	3,784	Red River Athletic Conference
Texas College	Steers	Tyler	Texas	644	Red River Athletic Conference
Texas Wesleyan University (Note: Texas Wesleyan will start a transition to NCAA Division II and the Lone Star Conference no later than July 2028, before starting full NCAA competition by that time, pending NCAA approval.)	Rams	Fort Worth	Texas	2,595	Sooner Athletic Conference
Thomas University	Night Hawks	Thomasville	Georgia	1,583	Southern States Athletic Conference
Tougaloo College	Bulldogs	Tougaloo	Mississippi	725	HBCU Athletic Conference
Trinity Western University*	Spartans	Langley	British Columbia	6,000	Cascade Collegiate Conference
Truett McConnell University	Bears	Cleveland	Georgia	2,714	Appalachian Athletic Conference
Union Commonwealth University	Bulldogs	Barbourville	Kentucky	1,129	Appalachian Athletic Conference
United States Sports University*	Eagles	Daphne	Alabama	367	Continental Athletic Conference (Southern States Athletic Conference in 2027)
Valley City State University	Vikings	Valley City	North Dakota	1,754	Frontier Conference
University of Victoria*	Vikes	Victoria	British Columbia	22,020	Continental Athletic Conference
University of the Virgin Islands	Buccaneers	Saint Thomas	US Virgin Islands	1,739	HBCU Athletic Conference
Viterbo University	V-Hawks	La Crosse	Wisconsin	2,301	Chicagoland Collegiate Athletic Conference
Voorhees University	Tigers	Denmark	South Carolina	515	HBCU Athletic Conference
Waldorf University	Warriors	Forest City	Iowa	2,657	Great Plains Athletic Conference
Walla Walla University	Wolves	College Place	Washington	1,397	Cascade Collegiate Conference
Warner University	Royals	Lake Wales	Florida	891	Sun Conference
Warner Pacific University	Knights	Portland	Oregon	350	Cascade Collegiate Conference
Washington Adventist University	Shock	Takoma Park	Maryland	695	Continental Athletic Conference
Wayland Baptist University	Pioneers & Flying Queens (Note: The women's basketball team uses the nickname Flying Queens.)	Plainview	Texas	2,861	Sooner Athletic Conference
Webber International University	Warriors	Babson Park	Florida	930	Sun Conference
Wesleyan College	Wolves	Macon	Georgia	859	Southern States Athletic Conference
West Virginia University Institute of Technology (WVU Tech)	Golden Bears	Beckley	West Virginia	1,448	River States Conference
Westcliff University	Warriors	Irvine	California	6,532	California Pacific Conference
Wilberforce University	Bulldogs	Wilberforce	Ohio	617	HBCU Athletic Conference
Wiley University	Wildcats	Marshall	Texas	636	HBCU Athletic Conference
William Carey University	Crusaders	Hattiesburg	Mississippi	5,448	Southern States Athletic Conference
William Penn University	Statesmen	Oskaloosa	Iowa	1,536	Heart of America Athletic Conference
William Woods University	Owls	Fulton	Missouri	1,729	Heart of America Athletic Conference
Williams Baptist University	Eagles	Walnut Ridge	Arkansas	514	American Midwest Conference
Xavier University of Louisiana	Gold Rush & Gold Nuggets	New Orleans	Louisiana	3,181	Southern States Athletic Conference
York University	Panthers	York	Nebraska	585	Kansas Collegiate Athletic Conference

== Future institutions ==
These programs have been approved by the NAIA Council of Presidents to become active NAIA members, beginning in the next academic year.

School	Nickname	City	State/ province	Enrollment^{(Fall 2024)}	Current affiliation	Conference	Joins
Christian Brothers University	Buccaneers & Lady Buccaneers	Memphis	Tennessee	1,772	Gulf South (NCAA Division II)	Mid-South Conference	2027–28
Manchester University	Spartans	North Manchester	Indiana	1,175	HCAC (NCAA Division III)	Crossroads League	2027–28
Salem University	Tigers	Salem	West Virginia	894	Independent (NCAA Division II)	River States Conference	2027–28
Yavapai College	Roughriders	Prescott	Arizona	7,428	ACCAC (NJCAA)	Great Southwest Athletic Conference	2027–28

== Pending ==
The following programs have announced their intention to pursue NAIA membership, but have not yet been approved for full membership by the NAIA. Schools wishing to join the NAIA may apply by April 15 to receive a decision in October, or by October 15 to receive a decision in April.

School	Nickname	City	State/ province	Enrollment^{(Fall 2024)}	Current affiliation	Conference	Applying by
Baker College	Bees	Owosso	Michigan	4,969	None (launching athletics)	Wolverine–Hoosier Athletic Conference	2027
Maharishi International University	Pioneers	Fairfield	Iowa	1,368	Independent (USCAA)	Heart of America Athletic Conference	2027
University of Michigan–Flint	Wolverines	Flint	Michigan	7,124	None (launching athletics)	Wolverine–Hoosier Athletic Conference	2028
Florida Polytechnic University (Florida Poly)	Phoenix	Lakeland	Florida	1,700	None (launching athletics)	Sun Conference	TBA

== See also ==
- List of NCAA Division I institutions
- List of NCAA Division II institutions
- List of NCAA Division III institutions
- List of USCAA institutions
- List of NCCAA institutions
- List of NJCAA Division I schools
- List of NJCAA Division II schools
- List of NJCAA Division III schools
- List of NAIA football programs
- NAIA lacrosse
- List of NAIA conferences
