= Mid-South Conference =

College athletic conference in the United States

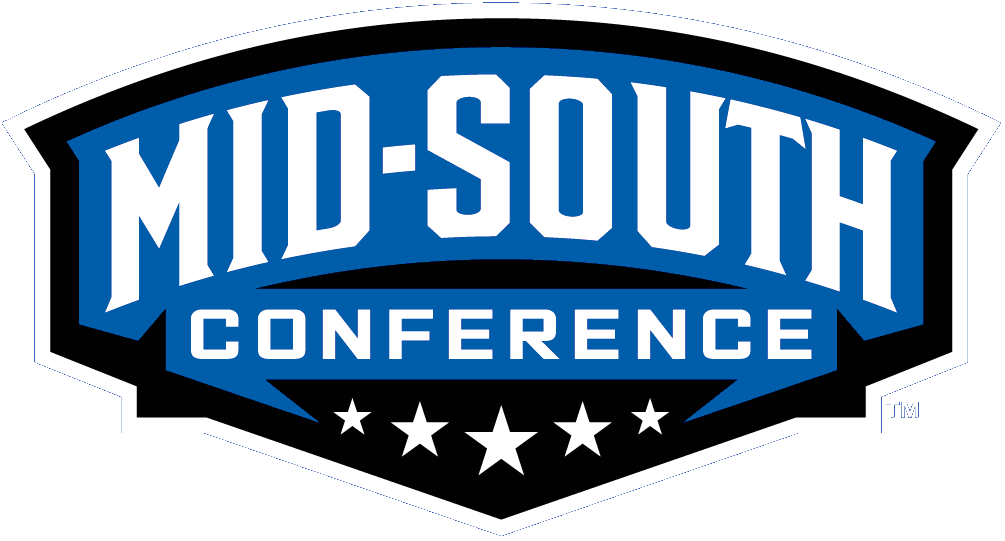
- Association: NAIA
- Founded: 1987; 39 years ago
- Commissioner: Chris Wells (Interim) (since May 14, 2025)
- Sports fielded: 26; men's: 13; women's: 13
- No. of teams: 7 (8 in 2027)
- Headquarters: Bowling Green, Kentucky
- Region: Southern United States
- Website: mid-southconference.org

Locations
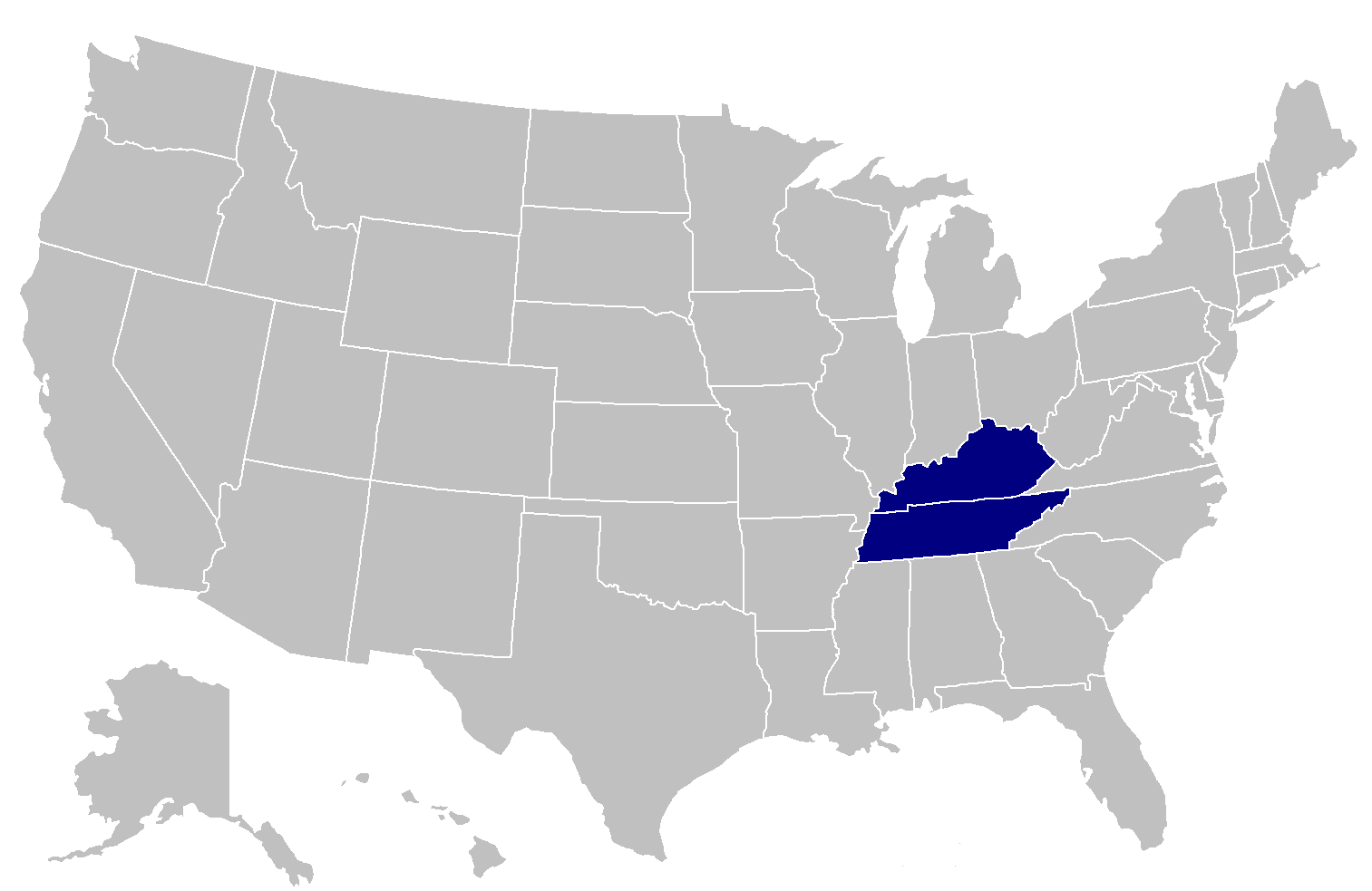

The Mid-South Conference (MSC) is a college athletic conference affiliated with the National Association of Intercollegiate Athletics (NAIA). Member institutions are located in Kentucky and Tennessee. The league is headquartered in Bowling Green, Kentucky, and the interim commissioner is Chris Wells.

The Mid-South Conference has 7 full members: Bethel (TN), Campbellsville, Cumberland (TN), Cumberlands (KY), Freed–Hardeman, Georgetown (KY) and Lindsey Wilson. Six of these members sponsor football; Freed–Hardeman does not.

The Mid-South Conference also has five associate members that compete primarily in other conferences. Kentucky Christian, Union Commonwealth and Reinhardt are associate members for football and men's volleyball. Former full member Bluefield is also an associate member for football and men's volleyball. This gave the conference 13 members for football. In the spring of 2016, the conference expanded to 20 members, adding the six football members of the Sun Conference, as well as Faulkner University for football, On January 4, 2018, the conference added Keiser University for football, and St. Thomas announced in July they were joining the conference for football in 2019. Another Sun Conference member, Florida Memorial in Miami Gardens, Florida, joined the MSC as an affiliate member for football in 2020, after re-adding the sport.

== History ==
Mid-South Conference
Location of Mid-South members: current, future

In April 2018, Thomas More University (then Thomas More College), which had been an NAIA member before moving to NCAA Division III in 1990, announced that it had been formally invited to rejoin the NAIA in the 2019–20 academic year as a member of the Mid-South Conference. The school, while acknowledging that it was considering this move, denied published reports that it had accepted the invitation. Thomas More eventually confirmed in July that it would join the Mid-South in 2019.

In 2020, Bethel University became a Mid-South full member, brought track and field back to the MSC, and transferred all sports other than football and archery to the conference (prior to that, Bethel was an associate member of the MSC for football and archery only); additionally, Freed–Hardeman and UT Southern, then known as Martin Methodist College, also joined Mid-South.

In December 2020, Life University also announced its departure from the MSC for the Southern States Athletic Conference for the 2022–23 academic year.

Most recently, Thomas More announced in August 2021 that it would return to the NCAA, but this time in Division II as a member of the Great Midwest Athletic Conference (G-MAC). It joined the G-MAC as a provisional member in July 2022, but continued as an NAIA member and in the Mid-South through 2022–23, after which it started G-MAC competition. Later, the Sun Conference announced on December 22, 2021, that it would reinstate football starting with the 2022 season. Then in July 2022, the Appalachian Athletic Conference announced it would add football as a sponsored sport.

On March 26, 2026, Faulkner left the Mid-South as an affiliate member for football to become an NAIA independent for the 2026 fall season.

=== Chronological timeline ===
- 1987 – The Mid-South Conference (MSC) was founded as a football-only conference. Charter members included Campbellsville College (now Campbellsville University), Cumberland College of Kentucky (now the University of the Cumberlands), Georgetown College and Union College (now Union Commonwealth University), beginning the 1987 fall season (1987–88 academic year).
- 1988 – The University of Evansville joined the conference in the 1988 fall season (1988–89 academic year).
- 1989 – Kentucky Wesleyan College and Tennessee Wesleyan University joined the conference in the 1989 fall season (1989–90 academic year).
- 1990 – Kentucky Wesleyan dropped out of the conference after the 1989 fall season (1989–90 academic year).
- 1990 – Cumberland College of Tennessee (now Cumberland University) and Lambuth University joined the Mid-South in the 1990 fall season (1990–91 academic year).
- 1991 – Cumberland (Tenn.) and Tennessee Wesleyan departed from the conference after the 1990 fall season (1990–91 academic year).
- 1991 – Tusculum University joined the Mid-South in the 1991 fall season (1991–92 academic year).
- 1992 – Evansville left the Mid-South after the 1991 fall season (1991–92 academic year).
- 1995 – The Mid-South became a multi-sport conference. North Greenville College (now North Greenville University) joined the conference beginning the 1995–96 academic year, while Bethel College of Tennessee joined as an affiliate member for football (with Cumberland [Tenn.] rejoining as well).
- 1996 – Tusculum departed from the conference as a football affiliate after the 1995 fall season (1995–96 academic year).
- 1996 – Cumberland (Tenn.) and Lambuth moved their other sports to the Mid-South as full members for the 1996–97 academic year.
- 1997 – Bethel (Tenn.) left the Mid-South as an affiliate member for football after the 1996 fall season (1996–97 academic year).
- 2000 – Lindsey Wilson College (now Lindsey Wilson University) and Pikeville College (now the University of Pikeville; a.k.a. UPike) joined the Mid-South in the 2000–01 academic year.
- 2001 – North Greenville left the Mid-South to join the Division II ranks of the National Collegiate Athletic Association (NCAA) as an NCAA D-II Independent after the 2000–01 academic year.
- 2002 – Two institutions left the Mid-South as full members to join their respective new home primary conferences, both effective after the 2001–02 academic year; while they remained in the conference as affiliate members for football:
  - Cumberland (Tenn.) to the TranSouth Athletic Conference (TranSouth or TSAC)
  - and Union (Ky.) to the Appalachian Athletic Conference (AAC)
- 2002 – The University of Virginia's College at Wise (UVa Wise) joined the Mid-South as an affiliate member for football in the 2002 fall season (2002–03 academic year).
- 2003 – Bethel (Tenn.) rejoined the Mid-South as an affiliate member for football in the 2003 fall season (2003–04 academic year).
- 2004 – Kentucky Wesleyan rejoined the Mid-South as an affiliate member for football in the 2004 fall season (2004–05 academic year).
- 2005 – Shorter College of Georgia (now Shorter University) joined the Mid-South as an affiliate member for football in the 2005 fall season (2005–06 academic year).
- 2006 – Lambuth left the Mid-South to join the TranSouth Athletic Conference (TSAC or TranSouth) after the 2005–06 academic year; while their football team remained in the Mid-South as an affiliate member.
- 2006 – Kentucky Wesleyan left the Mid-South again as an affiliate member for football after the 2005 fall season (2005–06 academic year).
- 2006 – West Virginia University Institute of Technology (West Virginia Tech or WVU Tech) joined the Mid-South in the 2006–07 academic year.
- 2007 – Bethel (Tenn.) and Shorter added track & field into their Mid-South affiliate memberships in the 2008 spring season (2007–08 academic year).
- 2008 – St. Catharine College joined the Mid-South in the 2008–09 academic year.
- 2008 – Faulkner University joined the Mid-South as an affiliate member for football in the 2008 fall season (2008–09 academic year).
- 2009 – The University of Rio Grande joined the Mid-South in the 2009–10 academic year.
- 2009 – Two institutions joined the Mid-South as affiliate members (and/or added other single sports into their affiliate memberships), both effective in the 2009–10 academic year:
  - Kentucky Christian University for football
  - and Cumberland (Tenn.) for men's wrestling
- 2010 – Lambuth left the Mid-South as an affiliate member for football after the 2009 fall season (2009–10 academic year).
- 2010 – Shawnee State University joined the Mid-South (with UVa Wise joining for all sports) in the 2010–11 academic year.
- 2010 – Shorter added men's wrestling into their Mid-South affiliate membership in the 2010–11 academic year.
- 2012 – West Virginia Tech left the Mid-South to become an NAIA Independent (which would later join the Kentucky Intercollegiate Athletic Conference (KIAC; now known as the River States Conference), beginning the 2015–16 school year) after the 2011–12 academic year.
- 2012 – Shorter (Ga.) left the Mid-South as an affiliate member for football, track & field and men's wrestling after the 2011–12 academic year.
- 2012 – Bluefield College (now Bluefield University) joined the Mid-South (with Cumberland [Tenn.] rejoining for all sports) in the 2012–13 academic year.
- 2012 – Bethel (Tenn.) and Union (Ky.) added men's and women's bowling into their Mid-South affiliate memberships in the 2013 spring season (2012–13 academic year).
- 2013 – UVa Wise left the Mid-South and the NAIA entirely to fully align with the NCAA Division II ranks, while joining the Mountain East Conference (MEC) after spending provisionally one season in the Great Midwest Athletic Conference (G-MAC) after the 2012–13 academic year.
- 2013 – Bethel (Tenn.) left the Mid-South as an affiliate member for track & field after the 2013 spring season (2012–13 academic year).
- 2013 – Reinhardt University joined the Mid-South as an affiliate member for football in the 2013 fall season (2013–14 academic year).
- 2014 – Two institutions left the Mid-South to join their respective new home primary conferences, both effective after the 2013–14 academic year:
  - Rio Grande to join the KIAC
  - Bluefield to rejoin the AAC; while their football team remained in the Mid-South as an affiliate member.
- 2014 – Life University joined the Mid-South in the 2014–15 academic year.
- 2015 – Belhaven left the Mid-South as an affiliate member for football to join the NCAA Division III ranks and the American Southwest Conference after the 2014 spring season (2014–15 academic year).
- 2015 – Eight institutions joined the Mid-South as affiliate members (and/or added other single sports into their affiliate memberships), all effective in the 2015–16 academic year:
  - Brewton–Parker College, St. Andrews University, Southeastern University of Florida and Truett McConnell College (now Truett McConnell University) for men's wrestling
  - Cincinnati Christian University for football
  - Lindenwood University–Belleville for men's & women's bowling and men's & women's swimming
  - and Martin Methodist College (now the University of Tennessee Southern, a.k.a. UT Southern) and Tennessee Wesleyan College (now Tennessee Wesleyan University) for men's and women's bowling
- 2016 – St. Catherine's left the Mid-South as the school had ceased operations after the 2015–16 academic year.
- 2016 – Three institutions joined the Mid-South as affiliate members (and/or added other single sports into their affiliate memberships), all effective in the 2015–16 academic year:
  - Loyola University New Orleans for men's and women's swimming
  - Reinhardt for men's wrestling
  - and Warner University for football
- 2017 – Four institutions left the Mid-South as affiliate members (and/or removed other single sports from their affiliate memberships), all effective after the 2016–17 academic year:
  - Reinhardt, St. Andrews (N.C.) and Truett McConnell for men's wrestling after the 2016–17 academic year:
  - and Lindenwood–Belleville for men's and women's bowling
- 2017 – Nine institutions joined the Mid-South as affiliate members (and/or added other single sports into their affiliate memberships), all effective in the 2017–18 academic year:
  - Ave Maria University, Edward Waters College (now Edward Waters University), Point University and St. Andrews (N.C.) for football
  - Bethel (Tenn.) for archery
  - Brewton–Parker and Lindenwood–Belleville for women's wrestling
  - Kentucky Christian for archery, baseball and softball
  - and Midland University for men's and women's swimming
- 2018 – Twelve institutions joined the Mid-South as affiliate members (and/or added other single sports into their affiliate memberships), all effective in the 2018–19 academic year:
  - Ave Maria, Keiser University and Marian University of Indiana for women's lacrosse
  - Bluefield, Brewton–Parker, Cincinnati Christian, St. Andrews (N.C.), Warner and Webber International University for men's volleyball
  - Indiana Wesleyan University for women's swimming
  - Midway University for men's volleyball and men's wrestling
  - and Union (Ky.) for archery
- 2019 – Five institutions left the Mid-South as affiliate members (and/or removed other single sports from their affiliate memberships), all effective after the 2018–19 academic year:
  - Brewton–Parker for men's volleyball
  - Edward Waters for football
  - Kentucky Christian for baseball and softball
  - Lindenwood–Belleville for women's wrestling and men's and women's swimming
  - and Midland for men's and women's swimming
- 2019 – Thomas More University joined the Mid-South in the 2019–20 academic year.
- 2019 – Six institutions joined the Mid-South as affiliate members (and/or added other single sports into their affiliate memberships), all effective in the 2019–20 academic year:
  - Blue Mountain College (now Blue Mountain Christian University), Marian (Ind.) and Midway for men's and women's bowling
  - Reinhardt and Truett McConnell for men's volleyball
  - and Keiser for men's wrestling
- 2020 – Cincinnati Christian left the Mid-South as an affiliate member for football and men's volleyball after the 2019 fall semester (without completing the rest of the 2019–20 academic year due to the school having to cease operations).
- 2020 – Freed–Hardeman University joined the Mid-South (with Bethel [Tenn.] and Martin Methodist (now UT Southern) upgrading as full members for all sports) in the 2020–21 academic year.
- 2020 – Nine institutions joined the Mid-South as affiliate members (and/or added other single sports into their affiliate memberships), all effective in the 2020–21 academic year:
  - Florida Memorial University for football
  - Indiana Institute of Technology, Lourdes University and St. Andrews (N.C.) for women's wrestling
  - Midway for men's and women's swimming
  - the University of Rio Grande for men's and women's swimming, and men's wrestling
  - St. Thomas University of Florida for men's wrestling
  - Truett McConnell for men's volleyball
  - and Webber International for women's lacrosse
- 2021 – Two institutions left the Mid-South as affiliate members (and/or removed other single sports from their affiliate memberships), both effective after the 2020–21 academic year:
  - Marian (Ind.) men's and women's bowling
  - and Rio Grande for men's and women's swimming
- 2021 – Three institutions joined the Mid-South as affiliate members (and/or added other single sports into their affiliate memberships), all effective in the 2021–22 academic year:
  - Indiana Wesleyan for men's swimming
  - Lincoln College of Illinois for men's and women's swimming
  - and Rio Grande for men's volleyball
- 2022 – Life left the Mid-South to join the Southern States Athletic Conference (SSAC) after the 2021–22 academic year; while their women's wrestling team remained in the Mid-South as an affiliate member.
- 2022 – Seventeen institutions left the Mid-South as affiliate members (and/or removed other single sports from their affiliate memberships), all effective after the 2021–22 academic year:
  - Ave Maria for football and women's lacrosse
  - Bluefield, Reinhardt, St. Andrews (N.C.) and Warner for football and men's volleyball
  - Brewton–Parker for men's wrestling
  - Florida Memorial and Southeastern (Fla.) to join The Sun for football
  - Keiser for women's lacrosse and men's wrestling
  - Kentucky Christian, Point and Union (Ky.) to join the AAC for football
  - Lincoln (Ill.) for men's and women's swimming
  - Marian (Ind.) for women's lacrosse
  - St. Thomas (Fla.) for men's wrestling
  - Truett McConnell for men's volleyball
  - and Webber International for men's volleyball and women's lacrosse
- 2022 – Wilberforce University joined the Mid-South in the 2022–23 academic year.
- 2022 – Montreat College, Rochester University (now Rochester Christian University) and Siena Heights University joined the Mid-South as affiliate members for women's wrestling in the 2022–23 academic year.
- 2023 – Thomas More left the Mid-South and the NAIA entirely to fully align with the NCAA Division II ranks and the G-MAC after the 2022–23 academic year. During that same school year, they returned to the NCAA to join the G-MAC as a provisional member, while remaining committed to compete in their final season within the Mid-South and the NAIA.
- 2023 – Four institutions left the Mid-South to join their respective new home primary conferences, all effective after the 2022–23 academic year:
  - Shawnee State to the RSC; while their men's and women's swimming teams remained in the Mid-South as an affiliate member.
  - Pikeville (UPike) to the AAC; while their archery and men's and women's bowling teams remained in the Mid-South as an affiliate member.
  - UT Southern to rejoin the SSAC
  - and Wilberforce as an NAIA Independent within the Continental Athletic Conference
- 2023 – Two institutions joined the Mid-South as affiliate members (and/or added other single sports into their affiliate memberships), both effective in the 2023–24 academic year:
  - Brescia University for men's volleyball
  - and Midway for archery
- 2024 – Four institutions left the Mid-South as affiliate members (and/or removed other single sports from their affiliate memberships), all effective after the 2023–24 academic year:
  - Brescia, Midway and Rio Grande for men's volleyball
  - and St. Andrews (N.C.) for women's wrestling
- 2024 – Rio Grande added women's wrestling into its Mid-South affiliate membership in the 2024–25 academic year.
- 2026 – Faulkner left the Mid-South as an affiliate member for football to become an NAIA Independent after the 2025 fall season (2025–26 academic year).
- 2027 – Christian Brothers University will join the Mid-South in the 2027–28 academic year.

== Member schools ==
=== Current members ===
The Mid-South currently has seven full members, all private schools.

Institution	Location	Founded	Affiliation	Enrollment	Nickname	Joined (Note: Represents the calendar year when fall sports competition begins.)
Bethel University	McKenzie, Tennessee	1842	Cumberland; Presbyterian	2,974	Wildcats	2020 (Note: Bethel (Tenn.) left the Mid-South after the 1996 fall season (1996–97 season) for football; later rejoined in the 2003 fall season (2003–04 school year). It also added archery during the 2017–18 school year. In the 2020 fall season (2020–21 school year), Bethel moved track & field back to the Mid-South after initially joining as an affiliate from 2007–08 to 2012–13, and transferred all other sports to the conference as a full member.)
Campbellsville University	Campbellsville, Kentucky	1906	Baptist	12,451	Tigers	1987
Cumberland University	Lebanon, Tennessee	1842	Nonsectarian	3,072	Phoenix	1996; 2012 (Note: Cumberland (Tenn.) left the Mid-South after the 2001–02 school year to join the TranSouth Athletic Conference (TranSouth); before rejoining the Mid-South, which transferred all other sports to the conference as a full member in the 2012–13 school year)
University of the Cumberlands	Williamsburg, Kentucky	1889	Nondenominational	20,327	Patriots	1987
Freed–Hardeman University	Henderson, Tennessee	1869	Churches of Christ	2,294	Lions	2020
Georgetown College	Georgetown, Kentucky	1829	Baptist	1,463	Tigers	1987
Lindsey Wilson University	Columbia, Kentucky	1903	United Methodist	4,055	Blue Raiders	2000

=== Future members ===
Institution	Location	Founded	Affiliation	Enrollment	Nickname	Joining	Current conference
Christian Brothers University	Memphis, Tennessee	1871	Catholic (FSC)	1,813	Buccaneers	2027	Gulf South (GSC) (Note: Currently an NCAA Division II athletic conference.)

=== Affiliate members ===
The Mid-South currently has 16 associate members. All but two are private schools; one is fully public, and the other operates private and public institutions within a single entity.

Institution	Location	Founded	Affiliation	Enrollment	Nickname	Joined (Note: Represents the calendar year when fall sports competition begins.)	Mid-South sport(s)	Primary conference
Brewton–Parker College (Note: Brewton–Parker competed in the Mid-South as an affiliate member for men's volleyball during the 2019 spring season (2018–19 school year), and for men's wrestling from 2015–16 to 2021–22.)	Mount Vernon, Georgia	1904	Baptist	1,123	Barons	2017	women's wrestling	Southern States (SSAC)
Indiana Institute of Technology	Fort Wayne, Indiana	1930	Nonsectarian	2,862	Warriors	2020	women's wrestling	Wolverine–Hoosier (WHAC)
Indiana Wesleyan University	Marion, Indiana	1920	Wesleyan Church	14,957	Wildcats	2018^{w.sw.} 2021^{m.sw.}	women's swimming men's swimming	Crossroads
Kentucky Christian University (Note: Kentucky Christian competed in the Mid-South as an affiliate member for baseball and softball from the 2018 to 2019 spring seasons (2017–18 to 2018–19 school years); and for football from the 2009 to 2021 fall seasons (2009–10 to 2021–22 school years).)	Grayson, Kentucky	1919	Christian	541	Knights	2017	archery	Appalachian (AAC)
Life University (Note: Life was a full member of the Mid-South from 2014–15 to 2021–22.)	Marietta, Georgia	1974	Nonsectarian	2,711	Running; Eagles	2022	women's wrestling	Southern States (SSAC)
Lourdes University	Sylvania, Ohio	1958	Catholic	1,014	Gray Wolves	2020	women's wrestling	Wolverine–Hoosier (WHAC)
Midway University (Note: Midway competed in the Mid-South as an affiliate member for men's volleyball from the 2022 to 2024 spring seasons (2021–22 to 2023–24 school years).)	Midway, Kentucky	1847	Disciples of Christ	1,945	Eagles	2018^{m.wr.} 2019^{m.bw.} 2019^{w.bw.} 2020^{m.sw.} 2020^{w.sw.} 2023^{arch.}	men's wrestling men's bowling women's bowling men's swimming women's swimming archery	River States (RSC)
Montreat College	Montreat, North Carolina	1916	Presbyterian (PCUSA)	932	Cavaliers	2022	women's wrestling	Appalachian (AAC)
University of Pikeville (Note: Pikeville was a full member of the Mid-South from 2000–01 to 2022–23.)	Pikeville, Kentucky	1889	Presbyterian (PCUSA)	2,610	Bears	2023^{arch.} 2023^{m.bw.} 2023^{w.bw.}	archery men's bowling women's bowling	Appalachian (AAC)
University of Rio Grande (Note: Rio Grande was a full member of the Mid-South from 2009–10 to 2013–14.) (Note: Rio Grande competed in the Mid-South as an affiliate member for men's and women's swimming during the 2020–21 school year, and for men's volleyball from the 2022 to 2024 spring seasons (2021–22 to 2023–24 school years).)	Rio Grande, Ohio	1876	Hybrid (Note: Rio Grande consists of a public community college and a private, nonsectarian four-year university.)	2,168	RedStorm	2020^{m.wr.} 2024^{w.wr.}	men's wrestling women's wrestling	River States (RSC)
Rochester Christian University (Note: Formerly known as Rochester University prior to 2024 and Rochester College prior to 2019.)	Rochester Hills, Michigan	1959	Churches of Christ	1,173	Warriors	2022	women's wrestling	Appalachian (AAC)
Tennessee Wesleyan University (Note: Tennessee Wesleyan competed in the Mid-South as an affiliate member for football from the 1989 to 1990 spring seasons (1989–90 to 1990–91 school years).)	Athens, Tennessee	1857	United Methodist	1,074	Bulldogs	2015^{m.bw.} 2015^{w.bw.}	men's bowling women's bowling	Appalachian (AAC)
Union Commonwealth University (Note: Known as Union College before March 2024.) (Note: Union Commonwealth, then Union (KY), was a full member of the Mid-South from 1995–96 to 2001–02.) (Note: Union (KY) competed in the Mid-South as an affiliate member for football from the 1987 to 1994 and 2002 to 2021 fall seasons (1987–88 to 1994–95 and 2002–03 to 2021–22 school years).)	Barbourville, Kentucky	1879	United Methodist	1,129	Bulldogs	2012^{m.bw.} 2012^{w.bw.} 2018^{arch.}	men's bowling women's bowling archery	Appalachian (AAC)

=== Former members ===
The Mid-South has 14 former full members. Ten of these are private schools, and one other operates private and public institutions within a single entity.

Institution	Location	Founded	Affiliation	Enrollment	Nickname	Joined (Note: Represents the calendar year when fall sports competition begins.)	Left (Note: Represents the calendar year when spring sports competition ends.)	Subsequent conference	Current conference
Bluefield College (Note: Currently known as Bluefield University since 2021.)	Bluefield, Virginia	1922	Baptist	989	Rams	2012	2014	Appalachian (AAC) (2014–present)	
Lambuth University (Note: Lambuth remained in the Mid-South as an affiliate member for football from the 2006 to 2009 fall seasons (2006–07 to 2009–10 school years) and previously from the 1990 to 1995 fall seasons (1990–91 to 1995–96 school years).)	Jackson, Tennessee	1843	United; Methodist	N/A	Eagles	1996	2006	TranSouth (TSAC) (2006–09); NAIA/D-II; Independent (2009–11)	Closed in 2011
Life University (Note: Life remains in the Mid-South as an affiliate member for women's wrestling.)	Marietta, Georgia	1974	Nonsectarian	2,711	Running; Eagles	2014	2022	Southern States (SSAC) (2022–present)	
North Greenville College (Note: Currently known as North Greenville University since 2006.)	Tigerville, South Carolina	1891	Baptist	2,219	Crusaders (Note: North Greenville adopted its current nickname of Trailblazers since 2024.)	1995	2001	D-II Independent (2001–11)	Carolinas (CC) (Note: Currently an NCAA Division II athletic conference.) (2011–present)
University of Pikeville (Note: Pikeville remains in the Mid-South as an affiliate member for archery and men's & women's bowling.)	Pikeville, Kentucky	1889	Presbyterian (PCUSA)	2,610	Bears	2000	2023	Appalachian (AAC) (2023–present)	
University of Rio Grande (Note: Rio Grande remains in the Mid-South as an affiliate member for men's & women's wrestling.)	Rio Grande, Ohio	1876	Hybrid (Note: Rio Grande consists of a public community college and a private, nonsectarian four-year university.)	2,168	RedStorm	2009	2014	River States (RSC) (2014–present)	
Shawnee State University (Note: Shawnee State remains in the Mid-South as an affiliate member for men's and women's swimming.)	Portsmouth, Ohio	1986	Public	3,206	Bears	2010	2023	River States (RSC) (2023–present)	
St. Catharine College	St. Catharine, Kentucky	1873	Catholic (D.S.P.)	N/A	Patriots	2008	2016	Closed in 2016	
Thomas More University	Crestview Hills, Kentucky	1921	Catholic	1,947	Saints	2021	2023 (Note: Thomas More left the Mid-South after the 2022–23 school year. Initially the school joined the Great Midwest Athletic Conference (G-MAC) as a provisional member for most sports as a transitional NCAA Division II member school during 2022–23; but was fulfilling its commitments to the final year of competition in the Mid-South and in the NAIA.)	Great Midwest (G-MAC) (2023–present)	
Union College (Note: Currently known as Union Commonwealth University since 2024.) (Note: Union (Ky.) competed in the Mid-South as an affiliate member for football from the 2002 to 2021 fall seasons (2002–03 to 2021–22 school years).) (Note: Union Commonwealth (formerly Union [Ky.]) remains in the Mid-South as an affiliate member for archery and men's & women's bowling.)	Barbourville, Kentucky	1879	United; Methodist	1,129	Bulldogs	1995	2002	Appalachian (AAC) (2002–present)	
University of Tennessee Southern	Pulaski, Tennessee	1870	Historically Methodist	978	FireHawks	2020	2023	Southern States (SSAC) (2023–present)	
University of Virginia's College at Wise (Note: UVA Wise previously competed in the Mid-South as an affiliate member for football from the 2002 to 2009 fall seasons (2002–03 to 2009–10 school years).)	Wise, Virginia	1954	Public	1,911	Highland; Cavaliers (Note: UVA Wise dropped "Highland" from its athletic nickname in 2017.)	2010	2013 (Note: UVA Wise left the Mid-South after the 2012–13 school year. Originally it joined the Great Midwest Athletic Conference (G-MAC) as a charter member for most sports as a transitional NCAA Division II member school during the 2012–13 school year, but was fulfilling its commitments to the final year of competition in the Mid-South and in the NAIA. However it has never began competition as a full G-MAC member, as it would later announce that it would join the Mountain East Conference (MEC) beginning the 2013–14 school year.)	various (Note: UVA Wise had joined the following subsequent conferences: the Great Midwest Athletic Conference (G-MAC) during the 2012–13 school year; and the Mountain East Conference (MEC) from 2013–14 to 2018–19.)	South Atlantic (SAC) (2019–present)
West Virginia University Institute of Technology	Montgomery, West Virginia (Note: WVU Tech's campus is now in Beckley, West Virginia, but was in Montgomery during the school's tenure in the Mid-South Conference.)	1895	Public	1,448	Golden; Bears	2006	2012	USCAA/NAIA; Independent (2012–15)	River States (RSC) (2015–present)
Wilberforce University	Wilberforce, Ohio	1856	A.M.E. Church (Note: Also a Historically black college and university.)	617	Bulldogs	2022	2023	Continental (2023–24)	HBCU (HBCUAC) (2024–present)

=== Former affiliate members ===
The Mid-South had 38 associate members, all but two were private schools:

Institution	Location	Founded	Affiliation	Enrollment	Nickname	Joined (Note: Represents the calendar year when fall sports competition begins.)	Left (Note: Represents the calendar year when spring sports competition ends.)	Mid-South sport(s)	Primary conference
Ave Maria University	Ave Maria, Florida	2003	Catholic (Diocese of Venice)	1,335	Gyrenes	2017^{fb.} 2018^{w.lax.}	2022^{fb.} 2022^{w.lax.}	football women's lacrosse	The Sun
Belhaven University	Jackson, Mississippi	1894	Presbyterian	3,616	Blazers	1998	2015	football	C.C. South (CCS) (Note: Currently an NCAA Division III athletic conference.)
Bethel University (Note: Bethel (Tenn.) rejoined the Mid-South during the 2020–21 school year and transferred all other sports to the conference as a full member.)	McKenzie, Tennessee	1842	Cumberland; Presbyterian	2,974	Wildcats	1996 & 2003^{fb.} 2007^{t.f.} 2012^{m.bw.} 2012^{w.bw.} 2017^{arch.}	1997 & 2020^{fb.} 2013^{t.f.} 2020^{m.bw.} 2020^{w.bw.} 2020^{arch.}	football track & field men's bowling women's bowing archery	Mid-South (MSC)
Bluefield University (Note: Bluefield was a full member of the Mid-South from 2012–13 to 2013–14.)	Bluefield, Virginia	1922	Baptist	989	Rams	2014^{fb.} 2018^{m.vb.}	2022^{fb.} 2022^{m.vb.}	football men's volleyball	Appalachian (AAC)
Blue Mountain College (Note: Currently known as Blue Mountain Christian University since 2022.)	Blue Mountain, Mississippi	1873	Baptist	971	Toppers	2019^{m.bw.} 2019^{w.bw.}	2022^{m.bw.} 2022^{w.bw.}	men's bowling women's bowling	Southern States (SSAC)
Brescia University	Owensboro, Kentucky	1925	Catholic (Ursulines)	638	Bearcats	2023	2024	men's volleyball	River States (RSC)
Brewton–Parker College (Note: Brewton–Parker remains in the Mid-South as an affiliate member for women's wrestling.)	Mount Vernon, Georgia	1904	Baptist	1,123	Barons	2015^{m.wr.} 2018^{m.vb.}	2022^{m.wr.} 2019^{m.vb.}	men's volleyball	Southern States (SSAC)
Cincinnati Christian University	Cincinnati, Ohio	1924	Christian	N/A	Eagles	2015^{fb.} 2018^{m.vb.}	2020^{fb.} (Note: Cincinnati Christian closed at the end of the 2019 fall semester, without completing the rest of the 2019–20 school year.); 2019^{m.vb.}	football men's volleyball	N/A
Cumberland University (Note: Cumberland (Tenn.) was a full member of the Mid-South 1995–96 to 2001–02, before rejoining the Mid-South in the 2012–13 school year.)	Lebanon, Tennessee	1842	Nonsectarian	3,072	Bulldogs (Note: Cumberland (Tenn.) changed its nickname from Bulldogs to Phoenix in 2016.)	1990 & 2002;^{fb.} 2009^{m.wr.}	1991 & 2012;^{fb.} 2012^{m.wr.}	football men's wrestling	Mid-South (MSC)
Edward Waters University	Jacksonville, Florida	1866	AME Church	1,175	Tigers	2017	2019	football	Southern (SIAC) (Note: Currently an NCAA Division II athletic conference.)
University of Evansville	Evansville, Indiana	1854	United; Methodist	2,109	Purple Aces	1988	1992	football	Missouri Valley (MVC) (Note: Currently an NCAA Division I conference.) (Note: During their tenure as a football-only member, Evansville's primary conference home was the Midwestern Collegiate Conference (now known as the Horizon League).)
Faulkner University	Montgomery, Alabama	1942	Churches of Christ	2,933	Eagles	2008	2026	football	Southern States (SSAC) (Note: Their primary conference is the Southern States Athletic Conference, however since SSAC does not sponsor football, they will now compete as a NAIA Independent in that sport.)
Florida Memorial University	Miami Gardens, Florida	1879	Baptist	1,365	Lions	2020	2022	football	The Sun
Keiser University	West Palm Beach, Florida	1977	Nonsectarian	20,102	Seahawks	2018^{w.lax.} 2019^{m.wr.}	2022^{w.lax.} 2022^{m.wr.}	women's lacrosse men's wrestling	The Sun
Kentucky Christian University (Note: Kentucky Christian remains in the Mid-South as an affiliate member for archery.)	Grayson, Kentucky	1919	Christian	541	Knights	2009^{fb.} 2017^{bsb.} 2017^{sfb.}	2022^{fb.} 2019^{bsb.} 2019^{sfb.}	football baseball softball	Appalachian (AAC)
Kentucky Wesleyan College	Owensboro, Kentucky	1858	United; Methodist	834	Panthers	1989; 2004	1990; 2006	football	Great Midwest (G-MAC) (Note: During their tenure as a football-only member, Kentucky Wesleyan's primary conference home was the Great Lakes Valley Conference (GLVC).)
Lambuth University (Note: Lambuth was a full member of the Mid-South from 1995–96 to 2005–06.)	Jackson, Tennessee	1843	United; Methodist	N/A	Eagles	1990; 2006	1995; 2010	football	Closed in 2011
Lincoln College	Lincoln, Illinois	1865	Nonsectarian	N/A	Lynx	2021^{m.sw.} 2021^{w.sw.}	2022^{m.sw.} 2022^{w.sw.}	men's swimming women's swimming	Closed in 2022
Lindenwood University–Belleville	Belleville, Illinois	2003	Catholic	N/A	Lynx	2015^{m.bw.} 2015^{w.bw.} 2015^{m.sw.} 2015^{w.sw.} 2017^{w.wr.}	2017^{m.bw.} 2017^{w.bw.} 2019^{m.sw.} 2019^{w.sw.} 2019^{w.wr.}	men's bowling women's bowling men's swimming women's swimming women's wrestling	Closed in 2020
Loyola University New Orleans	New Orleans, Louisiana	1904	Catholic (Jesuit)	4,351	Wolf Pack	2016^{m.sw.} 2016^{w.sw.}	2022^{m.sw.} 2022^{w.sw.}	men's swimming women's swimming	Southern States (SSAC)
Marian University	Indianapolis, Indiana	1851	Catholic (S.S.F.)	3,586	Knights	2018^{w.lax.} 2019^{m.bw.} 2019^{w.bw.}	2022^{w.lax.} 2021^{m.bw.} 2021^{w.bw.}	women's lacrosse men's bowling women's bowling	Crossroads
Martin Methodist College (Note: Martin Methodist joined the Mid-South during the 2020–21 school year and transferred all other sports to the conference as a full member. In July 2021, Martin Methodist joined the University of Tennessee system to become the University of Tennessee Southern.)	Pulaski, Tennessee	1870	Public	978	RedHawks (Note: Martin Methodist (now UT Southern) changed its nickname from RedHawks to FireHawks in 2021.)	2015^{m.bw.} 2015^{w.bw.}	2020^{m.bw.} 2020^{w.bw.}	men's bowling women's bowling	Mid-South (MSC)
Midland University	Fremont, Nebraska	1883	Lutheran ELCA	1,557	Warriors	2017^{m.sw.} 2017^{w.sw.}	2019^{m.sw.} 2019^{w.sw.}	men's swimming women's swimming	Great Plains (GPAC)
Midway University (Note: Midway remains in the Mid-South as an affiliate member for men's wrestling, men's & women's bowling, men's & women's swimming and archery.)	Midway, Kentucky	1847	Disciples of Christ	1,945	Eagles	2018	2024	men's volleyball	River States (RSC)
Point University	West Point, Georgia	1937	Christian	2,827	Skyhawks	2017	2022	football	Appalachian (AAC)
Reinhardt University	Waleska, Georgia	1883	United; Methodist	1,170	Eagles	2013^{fb.} 2016^{m.wr.} 2019^{m.vb.}	2022^{fb.} 2017^{m.wr.} 2022^{m.vb.}	football men's wrestling men's volleyball	Appalachian (AAC)
University of Rio Grande (Note: Rio Grande was a full member of the Mid-South from 2009–10 to 2013–14; but still remains in the Mid-South as an affiliate member for men's & women's wrestling.)	Rio Grande, Ohio	1876	Nonsectarian	2,168	RedStorm	2020^{m.sw.} 2020^{w.sw.} 2021^{m.vb.}	2021^{m.sw.} 2021^{w.sw.} 2024^{m.vb.}	men's swimming women's swimming men's volleyball	River States (RSC)
St. Andrews University	Laurinburg, North Carolina	1896	Presbyterian (PCUSA)	N/A	Knights	2015^{m.wr.} 2017^{fb.} 2018^{m.vb.} 2020^{w.wr.}	2017^{m.wr.} 2022^{fb.} 2022^{m.vb.} 2024^{w.wr.}	men's wrestling football men's volleyball women's wrestling	Closed in 2025
St. Thomas University	Miami Gardens, Florida	1961	Catholic (Archdiocese of Miami)	6,455	Bobcats	2020	2022	men's wrestling	The Sun
Shawnee State University (Note: Shawnee State was a full member of the Mid-South from 2010–11 to 2022–23.)	Portsmouth, Ohio	1986	Public	3,206	Bears	2023^{m.sw.} 2023^{w.sw.}	2026^{m.sw.} 2026^{w.sw.}	men's swimming women's swimming	Mountain East (MEC)
Shorter University	Rome, Georgia	1873	Baptist	1,447	Hawks	2005^{fb.} 2007^{t.f.} 2010^{m.wr.}	2012^{fb.} 2012^{t.f.} 2012^{m.wr.}	football track & field men's wrestling	Carolinas
Siena Heights University	Adrian, Michigan	1919	Catholic (O.P.)	1,832	Saints	2022	2026	women's wrestling	Closed in 2026
Southeastern University	Lakeland, Florida	1935	Assemblies of God	10,400	Fire	2015	2022	men's wrestling	The Sun
Tennessee Wesleyan University (Note: Tennessee Wesleyan remains in the Mid-South as an affiliate member for men's & women's bowling.)	Athens, Tennessee	1857	United; Methodist	1,074	Bulldogs	1989	1991	football	Appalachian (AAC)
Truett McConnell University	Cleveland, Georgia	1946	Baptist	2,714	Eagles	2015^{m.wr.} 2019^{m.vb.}	2017^{m.wr.} 2022^{m.vb.}	men's wrestling men's volleyball	Appalachian (AAC)
Tusculum University	Tusculum, Tennessee	1794	Presbyterian	1,200	Pioneers	1991	1996	football	South Atlantic (SAC)
Union College (Note: Currently known as Union Commonwealth University since 2024.) (Note: Union Commonwealth (under the name Union [Ky.]) was a full member of the Mid-South from 1995–96 to 2001–02, but still remains in the Mid-South as an affiliate member for archery and men's & women's bowling.)	Barbourville, Kentucky	1879	United; Methodist	1,129	Bulldogs	1987; 2002	1995; 2022	football	Appalachian (AAC)
University of Virginia's College at Wise (Note: UVA Wise later became a full member of the Mid-South from 2010–11 to 2012–13)	Wise, Virginia	1954	Public	1,911	Highland; Cavaliers (Note: UVA Wise dropped "Highland" from its athletic nickname in 2017.)	2002	2010	football	South Atlantic (SAC)
Warner University	Lake Wales, Florida	1968	Church of God	891	Royals	2016^{fb.} 2018^{m.vb.}	2022^{fb.} 2022^{m.vb.}	football men's volleyball	The Sun
Webber International University	Babson Park, Florida	1927	Nonsectarian	930	Warriors	2018^{m.vb.} 2020^{w.lax.}	2022^{m.vb.} 2022^{w.lax.}	men's volleyball women's lacrosse	The Sun

=== Membership timeline ===
Full member (all sports) Full member (non-football) Associate member (football only) Associate member (sport)

== Sports ==
Member teams compete in 28 sports: 13 men's, 13 women's and 2 mixed.

Conference sports
Sport	Men's	Women's	Mixed
Archery			✓
Baseball	✓		
Basketball	✓	✓	
Bowling	✓	✓	
Cheerleading			✓
Cross Country	✓	✓	
Football	✓		
Golf	✓	✓	
Lacrosse		✓	
Soccer	✓	✓	
Softball		✓	
Swimming	✓	✓	
Tennis	✓	✓	
Track & Field Indoor	✓	✓	
Track & Field Outdoor	✓	✓	
Volleyball	✓	✓	
Wrestling	✓	✓	

In addition, the Mid-South Conference also conducts championships for Esports and competitive dance. The MSC also stages invitational tournaments for junior varsity squads in the sports of men's and women's basketball, baseball, softball, and women's volleyball, if enough schools sponsor JV teams in a given year.

=== Football divisions ===
Beginning with the 2017 season, The Sun Conference and Mid-South merged their football conferences into the largest football conference in college sports. Edward Waters was previously a full member of the Sun Conference from 2006 to 2010 and a football affiliate member from 2014 to 2016 seasons. Edward Waters left after the 2018 football season.

However, the Sun Division folded when its teams left the Mid-South after the Sun Conference reinstated football for 2022, leaving the Mid-South with 15 football members. Later, the Appalachian Division folded when the AAC announced to sponsor the sport for the 2022 fall season, leaving the Mid-South with 9 football members.

- Bethel (Tenn.)^{*}
- Campbellsville^{*}
- Cumberland (Tenn.)^{*}
- Cumberlands (Ky.)^{*}
- Faulkner^{**}
- Georgetown^{*}
- Lindsey Wilson^{*}
- Pikeville^{*}
- Thomas More^{*}

Notes

^{*} - Mid-South full member ^{**} - Mid-South affiliate member
