= Sun Conference =

College athletic conference

- Formerly: Florida Intercollegiate Athletic Conference (1990–1992); Florida Sun Conference (1992–2008)
- Association: NAIA
- Founded: 1990; 36 years ago
- Commissioner: Dustin Wilke
- Sports fielded: 24; men's: 10; women's: 13; coeducational: 1
- No. of teams: 10
- Headquarters: Tampa, Florida
- Region: Southern United States
- Official website: thesunconference.com

Locations
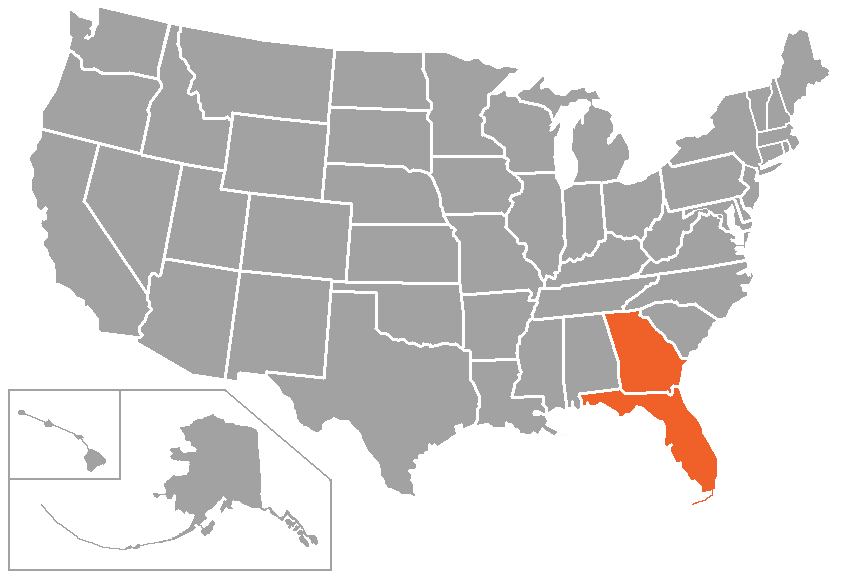

The Sun Conference (TSC) is a college athletic conference affiliated with the National Association of Intercollegiate Athletics (NAIA). Eight of the ten full member institutions are located in Florida, with two in Georgia. The Sun Conference competes in the NAIA in all sponsored sports.

== History ==
The Sun Conference
Location of TSC members: current

The conference was created in March 1990 as the Florida Intercollegiate Athletic Conference (FIAC), and renamed to the Florida Sun Conference in 1992. Charter members consisted of Embry–Riddle Aeronautical University, Flagler College, Florida Memorial University, Nova University of Advanced Technology (now Nova Southeastern University), Palm Beach Atlantic University, Saint Thomas University, Warner Southern College (now Warner University) and Webber International University.

The league later grew to nine members with the addition of Northwood University in 1994 (now Keiser University). Between 2002 and 2006, Nova Southeastern (2002), Palm Beach Atlantic (2003) and Flagler (2006) moved to NCAA Division II. But the league was able to recruit new members as Savannah College of Art and Design joined in 2004, followed by Edward Waters College (now a university) in 2006. It adopted its current name in August 2008 to reflect its expansion to institutions outside of Florida. With the addition of the University of South Carolina at Beaufort in 2008, the Florida campus of Johnson & Wales University at North Miami, Southeastern University and Ave Maria University in 2009, and Thomas University of Georgia in 2012, along with Edward Waters' move to the Gulf Coast Athletic Conference after the 2009–10 season, the league membership stood at 12 schools as of the 2012–13 season.

In 2014, Point University and former member Edward Waters College joined the conference for football only. Starting with the 2016 season, all six football members moved to the Mid-South Conference for that sport. Charter member Embry–Riddle Aeronautical University departed the conference on June 30, 2015 and joined the Sunshine State Conference (D-II). In 2017, the College of Coastal Georgia joined the Sun Conference, with the conference again standing at a total of 12 members. In 2018, Sun Conference member Keiser added football but Edward Waters left the Mid-South football league. In 2019, Saint Thomas also added football and Florida Memorial re-added the sport after more than 60 years, bringing the number of members participating in football to 8.

On June 25, 2020, Johnson & Wales announced it would close down its North Miami campus at the end of the 2020–21 school year, and on July 28, Johnson & Wales North Miami discontinued all sports.

On April 14, 2021, USCB Beaufort reported its invitation to join the Division II Peach Belt Conference in 2022 after applying for membership in, and pending acceptance into, the NCAA. The conference published on December 22 its reinstatement of football for the 2022 season, having grown to seven schools, with Thomas initiating football to become the eighth football member. By July 15, 2022, USCB was already accepted into the Continental Athletic Conference, formerly the Association of Independent Institutions, only for the first of its three-year NCAA provisional membership but with a Peach Belt schedule as part of the Sand Sharks' dual NAIA-NCAA membership.

In 2021, the Sun Conference added the University of Mobile, St. Andrews University, Truett McConnell University, and William Carey University as affiliate members for beach volleyball. Loyola University of New Orleans also participates in beach volleyball.

In 2022, Life University began participating in men's swimming, women's swimming, and women's lacrosse.

On July 1, 2022, Thomas announced that they would leave the conference and join the Southern States Athletic Conference (SSAC), starting in the 2023–24 academic year. They remain in the Sun Conference as an affiliate member for football, and men's and women's swimming from that day forward.

On October 2, 2023, the New College of Florida became the newest member to join the conference, starting in the 2024–25 academic year.

=== Chronological timeline ===
- 1990 – In March 1990, the Sun Conference was founded as the Florida Intercollegiate Athletic Conference (FIAC). Charter members included Embry–Riddle Aeronautical University–Daytona Beach, Flagler College, Florida Memorial University, Nova University of Advanced Technology (now Nova Southeastern University), Palm Beach Atlantic University, Saint Thomas University, Warner Southern College (now Warner University) and Webber International University, beginning the 1990–91 academic year.
- 1992 – The FIAC has been rebranded as the Florida Sun Conference in the 1992–93 academic year.
- 1994 – Northwood University–Florida joined the Florida Sun in the 1994–95 academic year.
- 2002 – Nova Southeastern left the Florida Sun and the NAIA to join the Division II ranks of the National Collegiate Athletic Association (NCAA) and the Sunshine State Conference (SSC) after the 2001–02 academic year.
- 2003 – Palm Beach Atlantic left the Florida Sun and the NAIA to join the NCAA Division II ranks as an NCAA D-II Independent after the 2002–03 academic year.
- 2004 – Savannah College of Art and Design at Savannah joined the Florida Sun in the 2004–05 academic year.
- 2006 – Flagler left the Florida Sun and the NAIA to join the NCAA Division II ranks as an NCAA D-II Independent after the 2005–06 academic year.
- 2006 – Edward Waters College (now Edward Waters University) joined the Florida Sun in the 2006–07 academic year.
- 2008 – The Florida Sun has been rebranded as The Sun Conference in the 2008–09 academic year.
- 2008 – The University of South Carolina at Beaufort (South Carolina–Beaufort or USC Beaufort) joined The Sun in the 2008–09 academic year.
- 2009 – Ave Maria University, the Florida campus of Johnson & Wales University (Johnson and Wales–North Miami) and Southeastern University of Florida joined The Sun in the 2009–10 academic year. Ave Maria joined as an associate/provisional member.
- 2010 – Edward Waters left The Sun to join the Gulf Coast Athletic Conference (GCAC; now the HBCU Athletic Conference or HBCUAC) after the 2009–10 academic year.
- 2012 – Thomas University joined The Sun in the 2012–13 academic year.
- 2014 – Point University joined The Sun as an affiliate member for football (with Edward Waters re-joining) in the 2014 fall season (2014–15 academic year).
- 2015 – Embry–Riddle left The Sun and the NAIA to join the NCAA Division II ranks and the SSC after the 2014–15 academic year.
- 2015 – Northwood–Florida left The Sun as the school announced that it would close after the 2014–15 academic year. However, Keiser University purchased the location, therefore it has inherited everything Northwood–Florida had sponsored (including its athletic program) and joined The Sun, beginning the 2015–16 academic year.
- 2017 – Point and Edward Waters left The Sun as affiliate members for football after the 2016 fall season (2016–17 academic year).
- 2017 – The College of Coastal Georgia joined The Sun in the 2017–18 academic year.
- 2020 – Johnson and Wales–Florida left The Sun as the school announced that it would close after the 2019–20 academic year.
- 2021 – The University of Mobile, St. Andrews University of North Carolina, Truett McConnell University and William Carey University joined The Sun as affiliate members for beach volleyball in the 2022 spring season (2021–22 academic year).
- 2022 – South Carolina–Beaufort (USCB or USC Beaufort) left The Sun to join the Continental Athletic Conference, in addition to the NCAA Division II ranks and the Peach Belt Conference (PBC) in the 2022–23 academic year. USC Beaufort would later leave the CAC and the NAIA after that school year to focus on realigning to the Peach Belt and the NCAA.
- 2022 – Four institutions joined The Sun as affiliate members (and/or added other single sports into their affiliate memberships), all effective in the 2022–23 academic year:
  - Life University for women's lacrosse and men's & women's swimming
  - Loyola University New Orleans for beach volleyball and men's & women's swimming
  - and the University of Tennessee Southern and William Carey for men's and women's swimming
- 2023 – Thomas (Ga.) left The Sun and join the Southern States Athletic Conference (SSAC) after the 2022–23 academic year; while its football and men's & women's swimming teams remained as an affiliate member.
- 2023 – Point (Ga.) rejoined The Sun as an affiliate member for men's and women's swimming in the 2023–24 academic year.
- 2024 – Point (Ga.) left The Sun as an affiliate member for men's and women's swimming after the 2023–24 academic year.
- 2024 – The New College of Florida joined The Sun in the 2024–25 academic year.
- 2024 – Brenau University and Spartanburg Methodist College joined The Sun as affiliate members for beach volleyball in the 2025 spring season (2024–25 academic year).

== Member schools ==
=== Current members ===
The Sun currently has ten full members, all but two are private schools. Departing members are highlighted in pink.

Institution	Location	Founded	Affiliation	Enrollment	Nickname	Joined (Note: Represents the calendar year when fall sports competition begins.)	Basketball?
Ave Maria University	Ave Maria, Florida	2003	Catholic (Diocese of Venice)	1,335	Gyrenes	2009	both
College of Coastal Georgia	Brunswick, Georgia	1961	Public	3,189	Mariners	2017	both
Florida Memorial University	Miami Gardens, Florida	1879	American Baptist (Note: Also a historically black college and university.)	1,365	Lions	1990	both
Keiser University	West Palm Beach, Florida	1977	Nonsectarian	20,102	Seahawks (Note: Keiser University's teams were the teams of Northwood University's Florida campus until Keiser University purchased it in 2015 and made the teams its own.)	2015	both
New College of Florida (NCF)	Sarasota, Florida	1960	Public	732	Mighty Banyans	2024	both
St. Thomas University	Miami Gardens, Florida	1961	Catholic (Archdiocese of Miami)	6,455	Bobcats	1990	both
Savannah College of Art and Design	Savannah, Georgia	1978	Non-profit art school	17,575	Bees	2004	none (Note: Savannah A&D had sponsored men's or women's basketball until after the 2008–09 school year.)
Southeastern University	Lakeland, Florida	1935	Assemblies of God	10,400	Fire	2009	both
Warner University	Lake Wales, Florida	1968	Church of God	891	Royals	1990	both
Webber International University	Babson Park, Florida	1927	Nonsectarian	930	Warriors	1990	both

=== Current affiliate members ===
The Sun has nine affiliate members, all but one are private schools:

Institution	Location	Founded	Affiliation	Enrollment	Nickname	Joined (Note: Represents the calendar year when fall sports competition begins.)	The Sun sport(s)	Current conference
Brenau University (Note: This institution is a women's college, therefore it does not compete in men's sports.)	Gainesville, Georgia	1878	Nonsectarian	2,420	Golden Tigers	2024	beach volleyball	Appalachian (AAC)
Life University	Marietta, Georgia	1974	Nonsectarian	2,711	Running Eagles	2022^{w.lax.} 2022^{m.sw.} 2022^{w.sw.}	women's lacrosse men's swimming women's swimming	Southern States (SSAC)
Loyola University New Orleans	New Orleans, Louisiana	1904	Catholic (Jesuit)	4,351	Wolf Pack	2022^{b.vb.} 2022^{m.sw.} 2022^{w.sw.}	beach volleyball men's swimming women's swimming	Southern States (SSAC)
University of Mobile	Mobile, Alabama	1961	Southern Baptist	1,911	Rams	2021	beach volleyball	Southern States (SSAC)
Spartanburg Methodist College	Spartanburg, South Carolina	1911	United Methodist	1,029	Pioneers	2024	beach volleyball	Appalachian (AAC)
Thomas University (Note: Thomas was a full member of The Sun from 2012–13 to 2022–23.)	Thomasville, Georgia	1950	Nonsectarian	1,583	Night Hawks	2023^{fb.} 2023^{m.sw.} 2023^{w.sw.}	football men's swimming women's swimming	Southern States (SSAC)
University of Tennessee Southern	Pulaski, Tennessee	1870	Public (Note: Part of the University of Tennessee System.)	978	FireHawks	2022^{m.sw.} 2022^{w.sw.}	men's swimming women's swimming	Southern States (SSAC)
Truett McConnell University	Cleveland, Georgia	1946	Baptist	2,714	Bears	2021	beach volleyball	Appalachian (AAC)
William Carey University	Hattiesburg, Mississippi	1892	Southern Baptist	5,448	Crusaders	2021^{b.vb.} 2022^{m.sw.} 2022^{w.sw.}	beach volleyball men's swimming women's swimming	Southern States (SSAC)

=== Former members ===
The Sun had nine former full members, most are private schools, one is public, and two are defunct:

Institution	Location	Founded	Affiliation	Enrollment	Nickname	Joined (Note: Represents the calendar year when fall sports competition begins.)	Left (Note: Represents the calendar year when spring sports competition ends.)	Subsequent conference(s)	Current conference
Embry–Riddle Aeronautical University (Daytona Beach Campus)	Daytona Beach, Florida	1926	Nonsectarian	12,268	Eagles	1990	2015	Sunshine State (SSC) (Note: Currently an NCAA Division II athletic conference.) (2015–present)	
Edward Waters College (Note: Currently known as Edward Waters University since 2021.) (Note: Edward Waters later joined The Sun as an affiliate member for football from the 2014 to 2016 fall seasons (2014–15 to 2016–17 school years).)	Jacksonville, Florida	1866	A.M.E. Church	1,175	Tigers	2006	2010	Gulf Coast (GCAC) (Note: Currently known as the HBCU Athletic Conference since fall 2024.) (2010–21)	Southern (SIAC) (2021–present)
Flagler College	St. Augustine, Florida	1968	Nonsectarian	2,441	Saints	1990	2006	D-II Independent (2006–09)	Peach Belt (PBC) (2009–present)
Northwood University–Florida	West Palm Beach, Florida	1984	Nonsectarian	N/A	Seahawks	1994	2015	N/A (Note: Northwood–Florida was sold to Keiser University in 2015.)	
Johnson & Wales University–Florida	North Miami, Florida	1992	Nonsectarian	N/A	Wildcats	2009	2020	Closed in 2021	
Nova Southeastern University	Fort Lauderdale, Florida	1964	Nonsectarian	20,877	Sharks	1990	2002	Sunshine State (SSC) (2002–present)	
Palm Beach Atlantic University	West Palm Beach, Florida	1968	Nondenominational	3,875	Sailfish	1990	2003	D-II Independent (2003–15)	Sunshine State (SSC) (2015–present)
University of South Carolina Beaufort	Beaufort, South Carolina	1959	Public	2,121	Sand Sharks	2008	2022	Continental (2022–23)	Peach Belt (PBC) (2022–present) (Note: USC Beaufort had dual membership with the NCAA (in its provisional transition phase) as the Sand Sharks remained in the NAIA as an Independent within the Continental Athletic Conference until spring 2023.)
Thomas University (Note: Thomas remains an affiliate member of The Sun in football and men's & women's swimming.)	Thomasville, Georgia	1950	Nonsectarian	1,583	Night Hawks	2012	2023	Southern States (SSAC) (2023–present)	

=== Former affiliate members ===
The Sun had three former affiliate members, all of them were private schools:

For the 2014 and 2015 football seasons, Edward Waters and Point joined the conference. All six members moved to the Mid-South Conference for the 2016 season. With the exception of Point, which participates in the Appalachian Division, these teams plus Faulkner University now form the Sun Division of the Mid-South Conference.

Institution	Location	Founded	Affiliation	Enrollment	Nickname	Joined (Note: Represents the calendar year when fall sports competition begins.)	Left (Note: Represents the calendar year when spring sports competition ends.)	The Sun sport(s)	Primary conference	Conference in former Sun sport
Edward Waters College (Note: Currently known as Edward Waters University since 2021.) (Note: Edward Waters was a full member of The Sun from 2006–07 to 2009–10.)	Jacksonville, Florida	1866	A.M.E. Church	1,175	Tigers	2014	2017	football	Southern (SIAC) (Note: Currently an NCAA Division II athletic conference.)	
Point University	West Point, Georgia	1937	Christian	2,827	Skyhawks	2014^{fb.} 2023^{m.sw.} 2023^{w.sw.}	2017^{fb.} 2024^{m.sw.} 2024^{w.sw.}	football men's swimming women's swimming	Southern States (SSAC)	Appalachian (AAC)
St. Andrews University	Laurinburg, North Carolina	1958	Presbyterian (PCUSA)	N/A	Knights	2021	2025	beach volleyball	Closed in 2025	

=== Membership timeline ===
Full member (all sports) Full member (non-football) Associate member (football-only)

== Sports ==
Conference sports
Sport	Men's	Women's
Baseball	✓	
Basketball	✓	✓
Beach Volleyball		✓
Cross Country	✓	✓
Flag football		✓
Football	✓	
Golf	✓	✓
Soccer	✓	✓
Softball		✓
Tennis	✓	✓
Track & Field Outdoor	✓	✓
Volleyball		✓
