= Montreat Cavaliers =

- University: Montreat College
- Association: NAIA
- Conference: AAC (primary); Mid-South (women's wrestling)
- Athletic director: Garrett Jones
- Location: Montreat, North Carolina
- Varsity teams: 22 (9 men's, 10 women's, 3 co-ed)
- Basketball arena: McAlister Gymnasium
- Baseball stadium: Newell Field
- Softball stadium: Roxy Hines Memorial Softball Field
- Soccer stadium: Howard Fisher Memorial Field at Pulliam Stadium
- Lacrosse stadium: Howard Fisher Memorial Field at Pulliam Stadium
- Nickname: Cavaliers
- Colors: Blue and Gold
- Website: montreatcavaliers.com
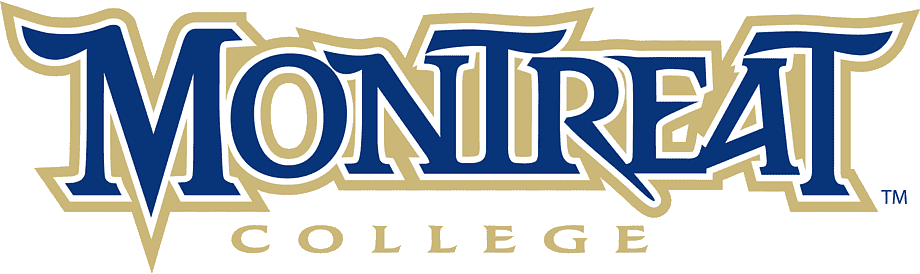

The Montreat Cavaliers are the athletic teams that represent Montreat College, located in Montreat, North Carolina, in intercollegiate sports as a member of the National Association of Intercollegiate Athletics (NAIA), primarily competing in the Appalachian Athletic Conference (AAC) since the 2001–02 academic year. They were also a member of the National Christian College Athletic Association (NCCAA), primarily competing as an independent in the South Region of the Division II level.

== Varsity teams ==
Montreat competes in 21 intercollegiate varsity sports:

Men's sports	Women's sports
Baseball	Basketball
Basketball	Cross country
Cross country	Golf
Golf	Lacrosse
Lacrosse	Soccer
Soccer	Softball
Tennis	Tennis
Track and field	Track and field
Wrestling	Volleyball
	Wrestling
Co-ed sports
Cycling
Target shooting
