= SCAD Atlanta Bees =

American Collegiate sports club

Coordinates: 33.7968°N 84.3915°W

- University: Savannah College of Art and Design (Atlanta campus)
- Association: NAIA
- Conference: AAC (primary)
- Athletic director: Glen Hill
- Location: Atlanta, Georgia
- First season: 2010
- Varsity teams: 14 (7 men's, 7 women's)
- Tennis venue: Bitsy Grant Tennis Center
- Nickname: Bees
- Colors: Yellow and Black
- Website: atlanta.scadathletics.com/index.aspx

The Savannah College of Art and Design Atlanta Bees (or SCAD Atlanta Bees) are the athletic teams that represent the Atlanta campus of the Savannah College of Art and Design (SCAD Atlanta), located in Atlanta, Georgia, in intercollegiate sports as a member of the National Association of Intercollegiate Athletics (NAIA), primarily competing in the Appalachian Athletic Conference (AAC) since the 2012–13 academic year; after spending two seasons as an NAIA Independent within the Association of Independent Institutions (AII) from 2010–11 (when the school began intercollegiate athletics and joined the NAIA) to 2011–12.

As a college of Art and Design, the school offers a sports lineup unlike most colleges. It is one of the few colleges in the United States to offer a competitive equestrian program, which is offered on the Savannah campus, as a SCAD Savannah Bees athletic team. and is unlikely to ever compete in some of the typical college sports, such as basketball or football.

== Conference affiliations ==
NAIA

- Association of Independent Institutions (2010–2012)
- Appalachian Athletic Conference (2012–present)

== Varsity teams ==
SCAD Savannah competes in 16 intercollegiate varsity sports. Men's sports include bowling, cross country, cycling, fencing, golf, tennis and track & field (indoor and outdoor); while women's sports include bowling, cross country, cycling, fencing, golf, tennis and track & field (indoor and outdoor).

== Origins ==
In 2010, SCAD Atlanta debuted in the NAIA with men's and women's golf, men's and women's tennis and men's and women's cross country.

== Achievements ==
In 2014, the Bees men's golf team were named the NAIA Academic national champions.

== Facilities ==
Golf is hosted by Legacy Golf Links in Smyrna and The Oaks Golf Course in Covington. Tennis competitions are at the Bitsy Grant Tennis Center in Atlanta.
