= Columbia College Koalas =

Athletic teams representing Columbia College in South Carolina

- College: Columbia College
- Nickname: Koalas
- Association: NAIA
- Conference: AAC (primary)
- Athletic director: Glen Crawford
- Location: Columbia, South Carolina
- Varsity teams: 18 (8 men's, 9 women's, 1 (Cheer) co-ed)
- Basketball arena: Porter Gymnasium
- Softball stadium: Sutton Softball Complex
- Soccer stadium: Younts Stadium
- Aquatics center: Greer Natatorium
- Tennis venue: Koala Tennis Courts
- Colors: Purple and Gray
- Mascot: Cece
- Website: www.gokoalas.com
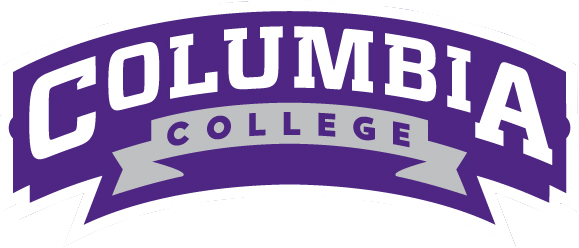

The Columbia College Koalas are the athletic teams that represent Columbia College, a liberal arts institution located in Columbia, South Carolina, in intercollegiate sports as a member of the National Association of Intercollegiate Athletics (NAIA), primarily competing in the Appalachian Athletic Conference (AAC) since the 2011–12 academic year. The Koalas previously competed in the Southern States Athletic Conference (SSAC; formerly known as Georgia–Alabama–Carolina Conference [GACC] until after spring 2004) from 2005–06 to 2010–11; and in the defunct Eastern Intercollegiate Athletic Conference (EIAC) during the 2004–05 school year.

== Conference affiliations ==
NAIA

- Eastern Intercollegiate Athletic Conference (2004–2005)
- Southern States Athletic Conference (2005–2011)
- Appalachian Athletic Conference (2011–present)

== Varsity teams ==
Columbia College competes in 18 intercollegiate varsity sports. Men's sports debuted when the college became co-educational in 2020, beginning athletic competition in the 2021 fall season. Esports, or competitive video gaming has become one of the fastest growing sports. Columbia College has had a growing Esports team since 2022, competing in the following games, Overwatch 2, Valorant, and Super Smash Bros Ultimate.

Men's sports	Women's sports
Basketball	Basketball
Cheer	Cheer
Cross Country	Cross Country
Golf	Lacrosse
Lacrosse	Soccer
Soccer	Softball
Swimming	Swimming
Tennis	Tennis
Track and Field	Track and Field
	Volleyball
