= Southern States Athletic Conference =

NAIA athletic conference in the US

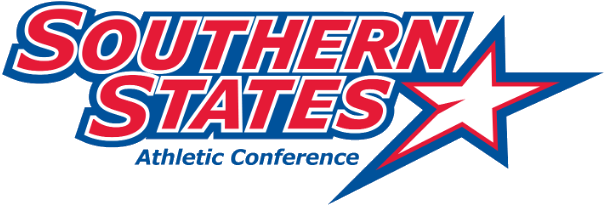
- Formerly: Georgia Alabama Carolina Conference (1999–2004)
- Association: NAIA
- Founded: 1999; 27 years ago
- Commissioner: Mike Hall
- Sports fielded: 20; men's: 9; women's: 10; coeducational: 1
- No. of teams: 15 (16 in 2027)
- Headquarters: Montgomery, Alabama
- Region: Southeastern United States
- Website: ssacsports.com

Locations
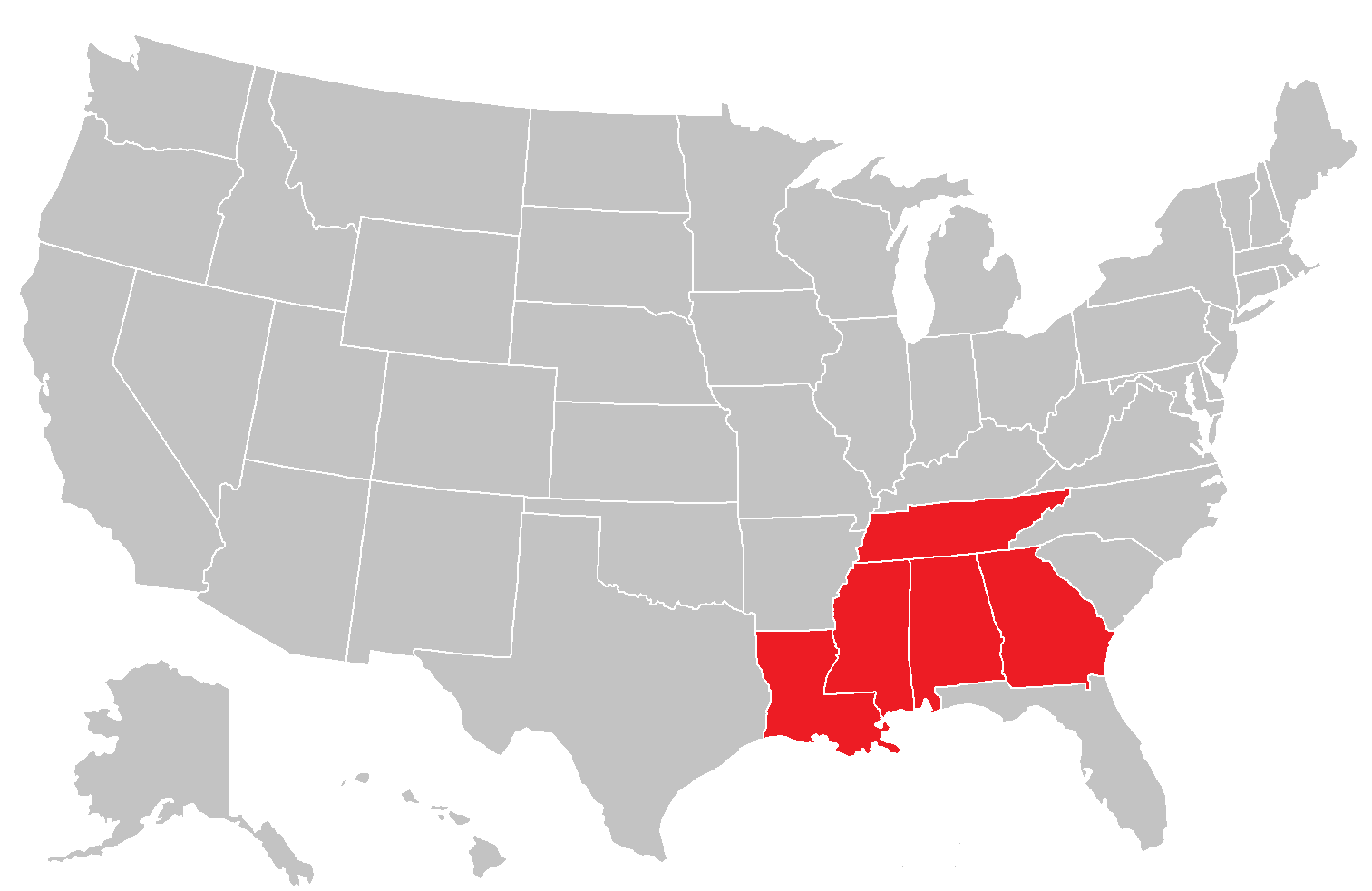

The Southern States Athletic Conference (SSAC) is a college athletic conference affiliated with the National Association of Intercollegiate Athletics (NAIA). The 12 member universities that compete in 20 sports are located in Alabama, Georgia, Louisiana, Mississippi, and Tennessee. Basketball teams compete as a single division in the NAIA.

== History ==
The Southern States Athletic Conference was established as the Georgia–Alabama–Carolina Conference (GACC) on March 16, 1999. On June 27, 2004, the conference changed its name to the Southern States Athletic Conference.

=== Chronological timeline ===
Southern States Athletic Conference
Location of SSAC members: current, departing, future
- 1999 – On March 16, 1999, the Southern States Athletic Conference (SSAC) was founded as the Georgia–Alabama–Carolina Conference (GACC). Charter members included Auburn University at Montgomery, Brenau University, Brewton–Parker College (now Brewton–Parker Christian University), Emmanuel College (now Emmanuel University), Faulkner University, Georgia Southwestern State University, North Georgia College & State University (now the University of North Georgia), Shorter College (now Shorter University), Southern Polytechnic State University and Southern Wesleyan University, beginning the 1999–2000 academic year.
- 2000 – Reinhardt College (now Reinhardt University) joined the GACC in the 2000–01 academic year.
- 2004:
  - On June 27, 2004, the GACC was rebranded as the Southern States Athletic Conference (SSAC) in the 2004–05 academic year.
  - Berry College and Lee University joined the SSAC in the 2004–05 academic year.
- 2005:
  - North Georgia left the SSAC and the NAIA to join the Division II ranks of the National Collegiate Athletic Association (NCAA) and the Peach Belt Conference (PBC) after the 2004–05 academic year.
  - Columbia College of South Carolina joined the SSAC in the 2005–06 academic year.
- 2006 – Georgia Southwestern State left the SSAC and the NAIA to join the NCAA Division II ranks and the Peach Belt (PBC) after the 2005–06 academic year.
- 2009 – Reinhardt left the SSAC to join the Appalachian Athletic Conference (AAC) after the 2008–09 academic year.
- 2010:
  - Berry left the SSAC and the NAIA to join the NCAA Division III ranks as an NCAA D-III Independent (which would later join the Southern Athletic Association (SAA) beginning the 2012–13 academic year) after the 2009–10 academic year.
  - Belhaven University, Loyola University New Orleans, the University of Mobile, Spring Hill College, Truett–McConnell College (now Truett–McConnell University), and William Carey University joined the SSAC in the 2010–11 academic year.
- 2011 – Columbia (S.C.) left the SSAC to join the Appalachian (AAC) after the 2010–11 academic year.
- 2012:
  - Shorter left the SSAC and the NAIA to join the NCAA Division II ranks and the Gulf South Conference (GSC) after the 2011–12 academic year.
  - The College of Coastal Georgia joined the SSAC in the 2012–13 academic year.
- 2013:
  - Lee left the SSAC and the NAIA to join the NCAA Division II ranks and the Gulf South (GSC) after the 2012–13 academic year.
  - Bethel University of Tennessee, Blue Mountain College (now Blue Mountain Christian University), and Martin Methodist College (now the University of Tennessee Southern) joined the SSAC in the 2013–14 academic year.
- 2014:
  - Three institutions left the SSAC and the NAIA to join the NCAA Division II ranks and their respective new home primary conferences, all effective after the 2013–14 academic year:
    - Emmanuel (Ga.) and Southern Wesleyan to the Conference Carolinas (CC)
    - and Spring Hill to the Southern Intercollegiate Athletic Conference (SIAC)
  - Southern Poly announced that it would drop its athletic program and close once it is consolidated by Kennesaw State University at the end of the 2013–14 academic year.
  - Dalton State College and Middle Georgia State University joined the SSAC in the 2014–15 academic year.
- 2015 – Belhaven left the SSAC and the NAIA to join the NCAA Division III ranks and the American Southwest Conference after the 2014–15 academic year.
- 2016 – Auburn–Montgomery left the SSAC and the NAIA to join the NCAA Division II ranks as an NCAA D-II Independent (which would later join the Gulf South (GSC), beginning the 2017–18 school year) after the 2015–16 academic year.
- 2017:
  - Two institutions left the SSAC to join their respective new home primary conferences, both effective after the 2016–17 academic year:
    - Brenau to join the Appalachian (AAC)
    - and Coastal Georgia to join the Sun Conference
  - Point University joined the SSAC as an affiliate member for competitive cheer in the 2017–18 academic year.
- 2018 – Florida College and Stillman College joined the SSAC in the 2018–19 academic year.
- 2020:
  - Bethel (Tenn.) and Martin Methodist left the SSAC to join the Mid-South Conference (MSC) after the 2019–20 academic year.
  - Two institutions joined the SSAC as affiliate members (and/or added other single sports into their affiliate memberships), both effective in the 2020–21 academic year:
    - Warner University for competitive cheer
    - and Xavier University of Louisiana for competitive cheer and men's and women's tennis
- 2021:
  - Florida College left the SSAC to become an NAIA Independent within the Continental Athletic Conference after the 2020–21 academic year.
  - Two institutions left the SSAC as affiliate members (and/or removed other single sports from their affiliate memberships), both effective after the 2020–21 academic year:
    - Warner University for competitive cheer
    - and Xavier University of Louisiana for competitive cheer and men's and women's tennis
  - Talladega College joined the SSAC in the 2021–22 academic year.
  - Five institutions joined SSAC as affiliate members (and/or added other single sports into their affiliate memberships), all effective in the 2021–22 academic year:
    - Dillard University, Florida National University, Rust College and Tougaloo College for men's and women's tennis
    - and Fisk University for women's tennis
- 2022:
  - Three institutions left the SSAC as affiliate members (and/or removed other single sports from their affiliate memberships), all effective after the 2021–22 academic year:
    - Fisk for women's tennis
    - and Rust and Tougaloo for men's and women's tennis
  - Life University joined the SSAC in the 2022–23 academic year.
  - Florida Memorial University joined the SSAC as an affiliate member for competitive cheer in the 2022–23 academic year.
- 2023:
  - Talladega left the SSAC to join the Gulf Coast Athletic Conference (GCAC, now the HBCU Athletic Conference) after the 2022–23 academic year.
  - Florida National left the SSAC as an affiliate member for men's and women's tennis after the 2023 spring season (2022–23 academic year).
  - Thomas University joined the SSAC (with the University of Tennessee Southern, formerly Martin Methodist, rejoining; plus Point upgrading for all sports) in the 2023–24 academic year.
  - Keiser University joined the SSAC as an affiliate member for competitive cheer in the 2023–24 academic year.
- 2024:
  - Stillman left the SSAC to join the HBCUAC after the 2023–24 academic year.
  - Two institutions left the SSAC as affiliate members (and/or removed other single sports from their affiliate memberships), both effective after the 2023–24 academic year:
    - Dillard for men's and women's tennis
    - and Keiser for competitive cheer
  - Abraham Baldwin Agricultural College joined the SSAC in the 2024–25 academic year.
- 2025 – Middle Georgia State left the SSAC to join the NCAA Division II ranks and the Peach Belt Conference (PBC) after the 2024–25 academic year.
- 2026 – Andrew College, Wesleyan College, and Xavier University of Louisiana all joined the SSAC, beginning the 2026–27 academic year.
- 2027:
  - Loyola New Orleans will leave the SSAC to join the NCAA Division II ranks and the Gulf South Conference (GSC) after the 2026–27 academic year.
  - Georgia Southern University–East Georgia Campus and the United States Sports University (U.S.S.U.) will join the SSAC, beginning the 2027–28 academic year.

== Member schools ==
=== Current members ===
The SSAC currently has 15 full members, all but three being public schools.

Institution	Location	Founded	Affiliation	Enrollment	Nickname	Joined (Note: Represents the calendar year when fall sports competition begins.)	Basketball?
Abraham Baldwin Agricultural College	Tifton, Georgia	1908	Public (Note: Part of the University System of Georgia.)	3,768	Golden Stallions	2024	both
Andrew College	Cuthbert, Georgia	1854	United; Methodist	496	Fighting Tigers	2026	both
Blue Mountain Christian University	Blue Mountain, Mississippi	1873	Southern Baptist	971	Toppers	2013	both
Brewton–Parker Christian University	Mount Vernon, Georgia	1904	Southern Baptist	1,123	Barons	1999	both
Dalton State College	Dalton, Georgia	1963	Public	4,902	Roadrunners	2014	men's
Faulkner University	Montgomery, Alabama	1942	Churches of Christ	2,933	Eagles	1999	both
Life University	Marietta, Georgia	1974	Nonsectarian	2,711	Running Eagles	2022	both
Loyola University New Orleans	New Orleans, Louisiana	1904	Catholic (Jesuit)	4,351	Wolf Pack	2010	both
University of Mobile	Mobile, Alabama	1961	Southern Baptist	1,911	Rams	2010	both
Point University	West Point, Georgia	1937	Christian	2,827	Skyhawks	2023	both
Thomas University	Thomasville, Georgia	1950	Nonsectarian	1,583	Night Hawks	2023	both
University of Tennessee Southern	Pulaski, Tennessee	1870	Public (Note: Part of the University of Tennessee System.)	978	FireHawks	2013; 2023 (Note: UT Southern initially joined the SSAC in the 2013–14 school year under its old name Martin Methodist College, before leaving after the 2019–20 school year, and then rejoining under its current name before the 2023–24 school year.)	both
Wesleyan College (Note: This institution is a women's college, therefore it does not field men's sports.)	Macon, Georgia	1839	United; Methodist	614	Wolves	2026	women's
William Carey University	Hattiesburg, Mississippi	1892	Southern Baptist	5,448	Crusaders	2010	both
Xavier University of Louisiana	New Orleans, Louisiana	1925	Catholic (S.B.S.) (Note: Also a historically black college and university.)	3,181	Gold Rush & Gold Nuggets	2026 (Note: Xavier was previously a SSAC affiliate member for cheer and men's & women's tennis for the 2020–21 athletic season.)	both

=== Future members ===
The SSAC will have two future members.

Institution	Location	Founded	Affiliation	Enrollment	Nickname	Joining (Note: Represents the calendar year when fall sports competition begins.)	Basketball?	Current conference
Georgia Southern University–East Georgia Campus	Swainsboro, Georgia	1973 (Note: GSU–East Georgia was originally founded as East Georgia State College, which began offering degrees in 1973. East Georgia State was consolidated into Georgia Southern as its East Georgia campus in 2026.)	Public	1,826	Golden Eagles	2027	both	NAIA Independent
United States Sports University	Daphne, Alabama	1972	Nonsectarian	367	Eagles	2027	none	NAIA Independent

=== Affiliate members ===
Institution	Location	Founded	Affiliation	Enrollment	Nickname	Joined (Note: Represents the calendar year when fall sports competition begins.)	SSAC sport(s)	Primary conference
Florida Memorial University	Miami Gardens, Florida	1879	American; Baptist (Note: Also a historically black college and university.)	1,365	Lions	2022	competitive cheer	The Sun (TSC)

=== Former members ===
The SSAC had 21 former full members, all but six were private schools. School names and nicknames reflect those used in the final school year of SSAC membership:

Institution	Location	Founded	Affiliation	Enrollment	Nickname	Joined (Note: Represents the calendar year when fall sports competition begins.)	Left (Note: Represents the calendar year when spring sports competition ends.)	Current conference
Auburn University at Montgomery	Montgomery, Alabama	1967	Public	5,189	Warhawks	1999	2016	Gulf South (GSC) (Note: Currently an NCAA Division II athletic conference.)
Belhaven University	Jackson, Mississippi	1883	Evangelical; Presbyterian	3,616	Blazers	2010	2015	C.C. South (CCS) (Note: Currently an NCAA Division III athletic conference.)
Bethel University	McKenzie, Tennessee	1842	Cumberland; Presbyterian	2,974	Wildcats	2013	2020	Mid-South (MSC) (Note: Bethel was already a Mid-South Conference affiliate in archery and football. Bethel returned to the MSC in track and field, and transferred all other sports to that conference as a full member.)
Berry College	Mount Berry, Georgia	1902	Nondenominational	2,370	Vikings	2004	2010	Southern (SAA)
Brenau University (Note: This institution is a women's college, therefore it does not compete in men's sports.)	Gainesville, Georgia	1878	Nonsectarian	2,420	Golden Tigers	1999	2017	Appalachian (AAC)
College of Coastal Georgia	Brunswick, Georgia	1961	Public (Note: Part of the University System of Georgia.)	3,189	Mariners	2012	2017	The Sun
Columbia College (Note: This institution was a women's college, but has since then been a co-educational institution, therefore it does compete in some men's sports [Columbia (S.C.) since 2020–21].)	Columbia, South Carolina	1854	United; Methodist	1,572	Fighting Koalas	2005	2011	Appalachian (AAC)
Emmanuel College (Note: Currently known as Emmanuel University since 2023.)	Franklin Springs, Georgia	1919	Pentecostal	896	Lions	1999	2014	Carolinas (CC)
Florida College (Note: Florida College had sponsored women's basketball until after the 2020–21 school year.)	Temple Terrace, Florida	1946	Churches of Christ	657	Falcons	2018	2021	Continental
Georgia Southwestern State University	Americus, Georgia	1906	Public	3,408	Hurricanes	1999	2006	Peach Belt (PBC)
Lee University	Cleveland, Tennessee	1918	Church of God	3,680	Flames	2004	2013	Gulf South (GSC)
Middle Georgia State University	Cochran, Georgia (Note: Middle Georgia State's main campus is in Macon, where the women's cross-country and volleyball teams and men's and women's tennis teams are housed; the other intercollegiate athletics teams compete on the Cochran campus.)	2013	Public	8,033	Knights	2014	2025	Peach Belt (PBC)
North Georgia College & State University (Note: North Georgia State consolidated with Gainesville State College in 2013 to form the current University of North Georgia.)	Dahlonega, Georgia	1873	Public	18,074	Saints (Note: Since the 2013 merger, North Georgia has competed as the North Georgia Nighthawks.)	1999	2005	Peach Belt (PBC)
Reinhardt College (Note: Currently known as Reinhardt University since 2010.)	Waleska, Georgia	1883	United; Methodist	1,170	Eagles	2000	2009	Appalachian (AAC)
Shorter University	Rome, Georgia	1873	Baptist	1,447	Hawks	1999	2012	Carolinas (CC)
Southern Polytechnic State University	Marietta, Georgia	1948	Public	N/A	Runnin' Hornets	1999	2014	N/A (Note: Southern Poly had consolidated with Kennesaw State University in 2014.)
Southern Wesleyan University	Central, South Carolina	1906	Wesleyan	1,188	Warriors	1999	2014	Carolinas (CC)
Spring Hill College	Mobile, Alabama	1830	Catholic (Jesuit)	977	Badgers	2010	2014	Southern (SIAC)
Stillman College	Tuscaloosa, Alabama	1876	Presbyterian (Note: Also a historically black college and university.) (PCUSA)	779	Tigers	2018	2024	HBCU (HBCUAC)
Talladega College	Talladega, Alabama	1867	U.C.C.	837	Tornadoes	2021	2023	HBCU (HBCUAC)
Truett–McConnell College	Cleveland, Georgia	1946	Baptist	2,714	Bears	2010	2013	Appalachian (AAC)

=== Former affiliate members ===
The SSAC had nine former affiliate members, all were private schools.

Institution	Location	Founded	Affiliation	Enrollment	Nickname	Joined (Note: Represents the calendar year when fall sports competition begins.)	Left (Note: Represents the calendar year when spring sports competition ends.)	SSAC sport(s)	Primary conference
Dillard University	New Orleans, Louisiana	1869	United; Methodist & U.C.C. (Note: Also a historically black college and university.)	1,122	Bleu Devils & Lady Bleu Devils	2021^{m.ten.} 2021^{w.ten.}	2024^{m.ten.} 2024^{w.ten.}	men's tennis women's tennis	HBCU (HBCUAC)
Fisk University	Nashville, Tennessee	1866	U.C.C.	1,005	Bulldogs	2021	2022	women's tennis	HBCU (HBCUAC)
Florida National University	Hialeah, Florida	1988	For-profit	2,638	Conquistadors	2021^{m.ten.} 2021^{w.ten.}	2023^{m.ten.} 2023^{w.ten.}	men's tennis women's tennis	Continental
Keiser University	West Palm Beach, Florida	1977	Nonsectarian	20,102	Seahawks	2023	2024	competitive cheer	The Sun (TSC)
Point University	West Point, Georgia	1937	Christian	2,827	Skyhawks	2017	2023	competitive cheer	Southern States (SSAC)
Rust College	Holly Springs, Mississippi	1866	United; Methodist	429	Bearcats	2021^{m.ten.} 2021^{w.ten.}	2022^{m.ten.} 2022^{w.ten.}	men's tennis women's tennis	HBCU (HBCUAC)
Tougaloo College	Tougaloo, Mississippi	1869	U.C.C. & Disciples of Christ	725	Bulldogs	2021^{m.ten.} 2021^{w.ten.}	2022^{m.ten.} 2022^{w.ten.}	men's tennis women's tennis	HBCU (HBCUAC)
Warner University	Lake Wales, Florida	1968	Church of God	891	Royals	2020	2021	competitive cheer	The Sun (TSC)
Xavier University of Louisiana	New Orleans, Louisiana	1925	Catholic (S.B.S.)	3,181	Gold Rush & Gold Nuggets	2020^{cheer.} 2020^{m.ten.} 2020^{w.ten.}	2021^{cheer.} 2021^{m.ten.} 2021^{w.ten.}	competitive cheer men's tennis women's tennis	Red River (RRAC)

=== Membership timeline ===
Full member (non-football)

== Sports ==
The SSAC holds championships in the following 20 sports:

A divisional format is used for men's and women's basketball.
East
- Abraham Baldwin
- Brewton-Parker
- Dalton State <men's only>
- Life
- Point
- Thomas
West
- Blue Mountain Christian
- Faulkner
- Loyola [La.]
- Mobile
- Tennessee-Southern
- William Carey

Conference sports
Sport	Men's	Women's	Mixed
Baseball	✓		
Basketball	✓	✓	
Bowling	✓	✓	
Competitive Cheer			✓
Cross Country	✓	✓	
Golf	✓	✓	
Soccer	✓	✓	
Softball		✓	
Tennis	✓	✓	
Track & Field Indoor	✓	✓	
Track & Field Outdoor	✓	✓	
Volleyball		✓	
