= Appalachian Athletic Conference =

NAIA college athletic conference

- Association: NAIA
- Founded: 2000; 26 years ago
- Commissioner: Bill Popp
- Sports fielded: 24; men's: 13; women's: 11
- No. of teams: 14 (15 in 2027)
- Headquarters: Asheville, North Carolina
- Region: Southeastern United States
- Website: aacsports.com

Locations
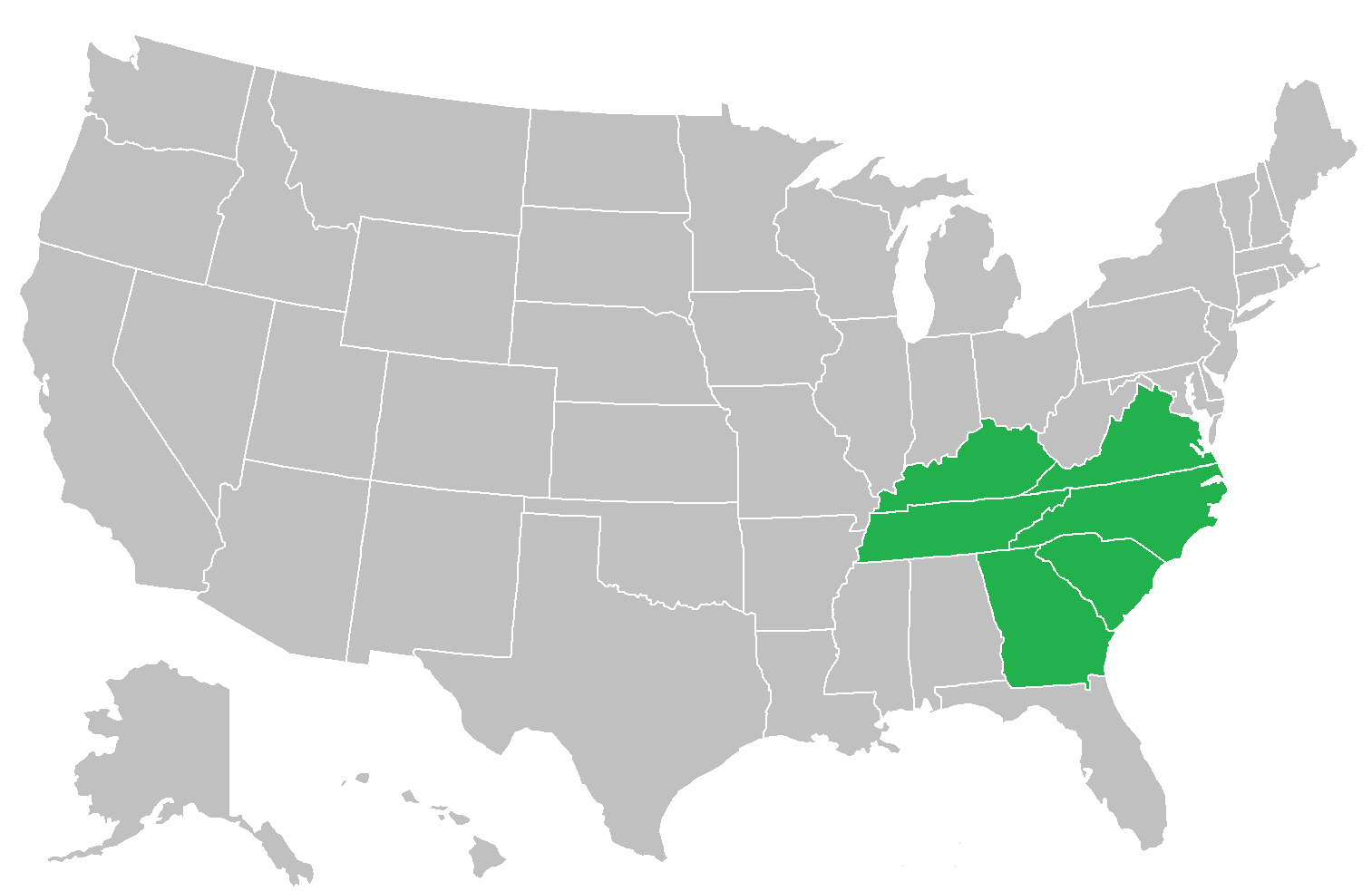

The Appalachian Athletic Conference (AAC) is a college athletic conference affiliated with the National Association of Intercollegiate Athletics (NAIA). Members of the conference are located in the Southeastern United States in Tennessee, Kentucky, Georgia, South Carolina, North Carolina, and Virginia.

== History ==
Appalachian Athletic Conference
Location of AAC members: current, future

The conference is the successor to the Volunteer State Athletic Conference (VSAC), which began in the 1940s; and later the Tennessee-Virginia Athletic Conference (TVAC) that operated during the 1980s and 1990s. The Appalachian Athletic Conference was formed in 2000 with the additions of members from Virginia, Kentucky, and North Carolina.

=== Recent changes ===
Bluefield College was a member of the AAC from 2000 until 2012 when it left to join the Mid-South Conference. On March 3, 2014, Bluefield announced that it would return to the AAC in fall 2014.

In 2019 the conference added Kentucky Christian University as a full member and Savannah College of Art and Design as an associate member in men's and women's lacrosse.

=== Chronological timeline ===
- 2000 – In 2000, the Appalachian Athletic Conference (AAC) was founded from the remnants of the Tennessee-Virginia Athletic Conference (TVAC). Charter members included Alice Lloyd College, Bluefield College (now Bluefield University), King College (now King University), Milligan College (now Milligan University), Montreat College, Tennessee Wesleyan College (now Tennessee Wesleyan University), Virginia Intermont College and the University of Virginia–Wise (UVA Wise); as well as the additions of Bryan College, Brevard College, and Covenant College, beginning the 2000–01 academic year.
- 2002 – Union College (now Union Commonwealth University) joined the AAC in the 2002–03 academic year.
- 2005 – Alice Lloyd left the AAC to rejoin the Kentucky Intercollegiate Athletic Conference (KIAC; now the River States Conference) after the 2004–05 academic year.
- 2006 – Brevard left the AAC and the NAIA to join the Division II ranks of the National Collegiate Athletic Association (NCAA) as an NCAA D-II Independent (to later join the South Atlantic Conference (SAC), beginning the 2008–09 school year) after the 2005–06 academic year.
- 2009:
  - Two institutions left the AAC to join their respective new home primary conferences, both effective after the 2008–09 academic year:
    - Covenant to join the NCAA Division III ranks as an NCAA D-III Independent (to later join the Great South Athletic Conference (GSAC), beginning the 2010–11 school year)
    - King (Tenn.) to become an NAIA Independent (to later join the NCAA Division II ranks as an NCAA D-II Independent during the 2010–11 school year; and then subsequently join the Conference Carolinas (CC), beginning 2011–12)
  - Reinhardt College (now Reinhardt University) joined the AAC in the 2009–10 academic year.
- 2010 – UVa Wise left the AAC to join the Mid-South Conference (MSC) after the 2009–10 academic year.
- 2011 – Columbia College and Atlanta Christian College (now Point University) joined the AAC in the 2011–12 academic year.
- 2012:
  - Bluefield left the AAC to join the Mid-South after the 2011–12 academic year.
  - St. Andrews University (formerly St. Andrews Presbyterian College) and the Savannah College of Art and Design at Atlanta joined the AAC in the 2012–13 academic year.
- 2013 – Truett McConnell University joined the AAC in the 2013–14 academic year.
- 2014:
  - Virginia Intermont left the AAC when the school ceased operations after the 2013–14 academic year.
  - Bluefield rejoined the AAC in the 2014–15 academic year.
- 2015 – Asbury University and the University of the Cumberlands joined the AAC as affiliate members for men's and women's lacrosse in the 2016 spring season (2015–16 academic year).
- 2016:
  - West Virginia University Institute of Technology (West Virginia Tech or WVU Tech) joined the AAC as an affiliate member for men's and women's swimming in the 2016–17 academic year.
  - Allen University joined the AAC in the 2016–17 academic year.
- 2017:
  - Brenau University joined the AAC in the 2017–18 academic year.
  - Two institutions joined the AAC as affiliate members (and/or added other single sports into their affiliate memberships), both effective in the 2017–18 academic year:
    - Georgetown College for women's lacrosse
    - and West Virginia Tech for men's wrestling
- 2018:
  - Cumberlands (Ky.) and Georgetown (Ky.) left the AAC as affiliate members for women's lacrosse to compete in their primary home conference in the Mid-South (where they began sponsoring that sport) after the 2018 spring season (2017–18 academic year).
  - Columbia International University joined the AAC in the 2018–19 academic year.
- 2019:
  - Asbury left the AAC as an affiliate member for men's lacrosse as the school announced to discontinue the sport during mid-season within the 2019 spring season (2018–19 academic year).
  - Kentucky Christian University joined the AAC in the 2019–20 academic year.
  - Savannah College of Art and Design at Savannah joined the AAC as an affiliate member for men's and women's lacrosse in the 2020 spring season (2019–20 academic year).
- 2020:
  - Allen left the AAC and the NAIA to join the NCAA Division II ranks and to rejoin the Southern Intercollegiate Athletic Conference (SIAC) after the 2019–20 academic year.
  - Webber International University joined the AAC as an affiliate member for men's lacrosse in the 2021 spring season (2020–21 academic year).
- 2021:
  - Asbury left the AAC as an affiliate member for women's lacrosse, men's and women's swimming after the 2020–21 academic year.
  - The Tennessee campus of Johnson University joined the AAC in the 2021–22 academic year.
  - Keiser University joined the AAC as an affiliate member for men's lacrosse in the 2022 spring season (2021–22 academic year).
- 2022:
  - Eight institutions joined the AAC as affiliate members (and/or added other single sports into their affiliate memberships), all effective in the 2022–23 academic year:
    - Brewton-Parker College, Keiser, St. Thomas University and Southeastern University for men's wrestling
    - Georgetown (Ky.) returned for women's lacrosse
    - Life University for men's volleyball and men's wrestling
    - and Warner University and Webber International for men's volleyball
  - The AAC began to sponsor football, with core members Bluefield, Kentucky Christian, Point, Reinhardt, St. Andrews (N.C.), and Union (Ky.) in the 2022 fall season (2022–23 academic year).
- 2023:
  - Point left the AAC to join the Southern States Athletic Conference (SSAC) after the 2023–24 academic year; while their football team still remains in the AAC as an affiliate member.
  - The University of Pikeville joined the AAC in the 2023–24 academic year.
- 2025:
  - Kentucky Christian left the AAC to join the River States Conference (RSC) after the 2024–25 academic year; while their football team still remains in the AAC as an affiliate member.
  - St. Andrews left the AAC as the school announced its closure after the 2024–25 academic year.
  - Spartanburg Methodist College joined the AAC as a full member the 2025–26 academic year.
  - The University of Rio Grande joined the AAC as an affiliate member for football in the 2025 fall season (2025–26 academic year).
- 2026:
  - The AAC confirmed SCAD Atlanta's departure from the conference after the 2025–26 academic year.
- 2027:
  - Carolina University will join the AAC as a full member starting in the 2027 fall season.
  - Andrew College and Faulkner University will join the AAC as affiliate members for football in the 2027 fall season (2027–28 academic year).

== Member schools ==
=== Current members ===
The AAC currently has 14 full members, all private schools.

Institution	Location	Founded	Affiliation	Enrollment	Nickname	Joined (Note: Represents the calendar year when fall sports competition begins.)	Basketball?
Bluefield University	Bluefield, Virginia	1922	Baptist	959	Rams	2000; 2014 (Note: Bluefield left the AAC after the 2011–12 school year to join the Mid-South Conference; before rejoining the AAC in the 2014–15 school year.)	both
Brenau University (Note: This institution is a women's college, therefore it does not compete in men's sports.)	Gainesville, Georgia	1878	Nonsectarian	2,436	Golden Tigers	2017	women's
Bryan College	Dayton, Tennessee	1930	Nondenominational	1,701	Lions	2000	both
Columbia College (Note: This institution was a women's college, but has since then been a co-educational institution, therefore it does compete in some men's sports (Columbia (S.C.) since 2020–21).)	Columbia, South Carolina	1854	United Methodist	1,725	Koalas	2011	both (Note: The Columbia (S.C.)'s men's basketball teams joined the AAC 13 years after becoming a full member for other sports (2024–25).)
Columbia International University	Columbia, South Carolina	1923	Christian	2,914	Rams	2018	both
Johnson University	Kimberlin Heights and Knoxville, Tennessee	1893	Christian	978	Royals	2021	both
Milligan University	Elizabethton, Tennessee	1866	Restoration; Movement	1,240	Buffaloes	2000	both
Montreat College	Montreat, North Carolina	1916	Presbyterian (PCUSA)	962	Cavaliers	2000	both
University of Pikeville	Pikeville, Kentucky	1889	Presbyterian (PCUSA)	2,547	Bears	2023	both
Reinhardt University	Waleska, Georgia	1883	United Methodist	1,233	Eagles	2009	both
Spartanburg Methodist College	Spartanburg, South Carolina	1911	United Methodist	1,119	Pioneers	2025	both
Tennessee Wesleyan University	Athens, Tennessee	1857	United Methodist	1,198	Bulldogs	2000	both
Truett McConnell University	Cleveland, Georgia	1946	Baptist	2,615	Bears	2013	both
Union Commonwealth University (Note: Formerly known as Union College until 2024.)	Barbourville, Kentucky	1879	United Methodist	1,324	Bulldogs and Lady Bulldogs	2002	both

=== Future member ===
The AAC will have one future full member for the 2027–28 school year:

Institution	Location	Founded	Affiliation	Enrollment	Nickname	Joining (Note: Represents the calendar year when fall sports competition begins.)	Current conference
Carolina University (Note: This institution held dual membership with the National Christian College Athletic Association (NCCAA).)	Winston-Salem, North Carolina	1945	Nondenominational	893	Bruins	2027	Continental (CAC)

=== Affiliate members ===
The AAC currently has 15 affiliate members. Thirteen are fully private, one is public, and one operates public and private schools within a single entity.

Institution	Location	Founded	Affiliation	Enrollment	Nickname	Joined (Note: Represents the calendar year when fall sports competition begins.)	AAC sport(s)	Primary conference
Brewton–Parker College	Mount Vernon, Georgia	1904	Baptist	1,338	Barons	2022	Men's wrestling	Southern States (SSAC)
Brewton–Parker College	Mount Vernon, Georgia	1904	Baptist	1,338	Barons	2024	Men's volleyball	Southern States (SSAC)
Carolina University	Winston-Salem, North Carolina	1945	Nondenominational	880	Bruins	2024	Men's volleyball	Continental
Georgetown College (Note: Georgetown (Ky.) competed in the AAC as an affiliate member for women's lacrosse during the 2018 spring season (2017–18), then rejoined since the 2023 spring season (2022–23 academic year).)	Georgetown, Kentucky	1829	Baptist	1,345	Tigers	2017; 2022	Women's lacrosse	Mid-South (MSC)
Keiser University	West Palm Beach, Florida	1977	Nonsectarian	20,888	Seahawks	2021	Men's lacrosse	The Sun
Keiser University	West Palm Beach, Florida	1977	Nonsectarian	20,888	Seahawks	2022	Men's wrestling	The Sun
Kentucky Christian University	Grayson, Kentucky	1919	Christian	550	Knights	2025 (Note: Kentucky Christian was a full member of the AAC from 2019–20 to 2024–25.)	Football	River States (RSC)
Life University	Marietta, Georgia	1974	Nonsectarian	2,714	Running Eagles	2022	Men's volleyball	Southern States (SSAC)
Life University	Marietta, Georgia	1974	Nonsectarian	2,714	Running Eagles	2022	Men's wrestling	Southern States (SSAC)
Point University	West Point, Georgia	1937	Christian	2,260	Skyhawks	2023 (Note: Point was a full member of the AAC from 2011–12 to 2022–23.)	Football	Southern States (SSAC)
University of Rio Grande	Rio Grande, Ohio	1876	Hybrid (Note: Rio Grande consists of a public community college and a private, nonsectarian four-year university. The community college component is part of the University System of Ohio.)	2,258	RedStorm	2025	Football	River States (RSC)
Savannah College of Art and Design	Savannah, Georgia	1978	Non-profit art school	18,550	Bees	2019	Men's lacrosse	The Sun
Savannah College of Art and Design	Savannah, Georgia	1978	Non-profit art school	18,550	Bees	2019	Women's lacrosse	The Sun
St. Thomas University	Miami Gardens, Florida	1961	Catholic (Archdiocese of Miami)	7,652	Bobcats	2022	Men's wrestling	The Sun
St. Thomas University	Miami Gardens, Florida	1961	Catholic (Archdiocese of Miami)	7,652	Bobcats	2024	Men's volleyball	The Sun
Southeastern University	Lakeland, Florida	1935	Assemblies of God	11,510	Fire	2022	Men's wrestling	The Sun
Talladega College	Talladega, Alabama	1867	United Church of Christ	760	Tornadoes	2024	Men's volleyball	HBCU (HBCUAC)
University of the Cumberlands (Note: Cumberlands (Ky.) competed in the AAC as an affiliate member for women's lacrosse from 2015–16 to 2017–18.)	Williamsburg, Kentucky	1887	Nondenominational	22,120	Patriots	2015	Men's lacrosse	Mid-South (MSC)
Warner University	Lake Wales, Florida	1968	Church of God	900	Royals	2022	Men's volleyball	The Sun
Webber International University	Babson Park, Florida	1927	Nonsectarian	878	Warriors	2020	Men's lacrosse	The Sun
Webber International University	Babson Park, Florida	1927	Nonsectarian	878	Warriors	2022	Men's volleyball	The Sun
West Virginia University Institute of Technology	Beckley, West Virginia	1895	Public	1,278	Golden Bears	2016	Men's swimming	River States (RSC)
West Virginia University Institute of Technology	Beckley, West Virginia	1895	Public	1,278	Golden Bears	2016	Women's swimming	River States (RSC)
West Virginia University Institute of Technology	Beckley, West Virginia	1895	Public	1,278	Golden Bears	2017	Men's wrestling	River States (RSC)

=== Future affiliate members ===
The AAC will have two future affiliate members, both private schools.

Institution	Location	Founded	Affiliation	Enrollment	Nickname	Joining (Note: Represents the calendar year when fall sports competition begins.)	AAC sport(s)	Primary conference
Andrew College	Cuthbert, Georgia	1854	United; Methodist	496	Fighting Tigers	2027	Football	Southern States (SSAC)
Faulkner University	Montgomery, Alabama	1942	Churches of Christ	2,933	Eagles	2027	Football	Southern States (SSAC)

=== Former members ===
The AAC had eight former full members, all but one were private schools:

Institution	Location	Founded	Affiliation	Nickname	Joined (Note: Represents the calendar year when fall sports competition begins.)	Left (Note: Represents the calendar year when spring sports competition ends.)	Subsequent conference(s)	Current conference
Alice Lloyd College	Pippa Passes, Kentucky	1925	Nondenominational	Eagles	2000	2005	River States (RSC) (2005–25)	Continental (2025–present)
Allen University	Columbia, South Carolina	1870	A.M.E. Church	Yellow Jackets	2016	2020	Southern (SIAC) (Note: Currently an NCAA Division II athletic conference.) (2020–present)	
Brevard College	Brevard, North Carolina	1853	United Methodist	Tornados	2000	2006	D-II Independent (2006–07); South Atlantic (SAC) (2007–17)	USA South (Note: Currently an NCAA Division III athletic conference.) (2017–present)
Covenant College	Lookout Mountain, Georgia	1955	Presbyterian (PCA)	Scots	2000	2009	various (Note: Covenant had joined the following subsequent conferences: as an NCAA D-III Independent during the 2009–10 and 2012–13 school years; the Great South Athletic Conference (GSAC) from 2010–11 to 2011–12; and the USA South Athletic Conference (USA South) from 2013–14 to 2021–22.)	C.C. South (CCS) (2022–present)
Kentucky Christian University	Grayson, Kentucky	1919	Christian	Knights	2019	2025	River States (RSC)	
King University	Bristol, Tennessee	1867	Presbyterian (Evangelical; Presbyterian/ PCUSA)	Tornados	2000	2009	NAIA Independent (2009–10); D-II Independent (2010–11)	Carolinas (CC) (2011–present)
Point University (Note: Point remains in the AAC as an affiliate member for football.)	West Point, Georgia	1937	Christian	Skyhawks	2011	2023	Southern States (SSAC) (2023–present)	
St. Andrews University	Laurinburg, North Carolina	1958	Presbyterian (PCUSA)	Knights	2012	2025	Closed in 2025	
Savannah College of Art and Design at Atlanta	Atlanta, Georgia	2005	Non-profit art school	Bees	2012	2026	None	
University of Virginia's College at Wise	Wise, Virginia	1954	Public	Highland; Cavaliers (Note: UVA Wise dropped "Highland" from its athletic nickname in 2017.)	2000	2010	various (Note: UVA Wise had joined the following subsequent conferences: the Mid-South Conference (MSC) (Note: UVA Wise left the Mid-South after the 2012–13 school year. Originally it joined the Great Midwest Athletic Conference (G-MAC) as a charter member for most sports as a transitional NCAA Division II member school during the 2012–13 school year, but was fulfilling its commitments to the final year of competition in the Mid-South and in the NAIA. However it never began competition as a full G-MAC member, as it would later announce that it would join the Mountain East Conference (MEC), beginning the 2013–14 school year.) from 2010–11 to 2012–13; the Great Midwest Athletic Conference (G-MAC) during the 2012–13 school year; and the Mountain East Conference (MEC) from 2013–14 to 2018–19.)	South Atlantic (SAC) (2019–present)
Virginia Intermont College	Bristol, Virginia	1884	Baptist	Cobras	2000	2014	Closed in 2014	

=== Former affiliate members ===
The AAC had two former affiliate members, both were private schools.

Institution	Location	Founded	Affiliation	Nickname	Joined (Note: Represents the calendar year when fall sports competition begins.)	Left (Note: Represents the calendar year when spring sports competition ends.)	AAC sport(s)	Primary conference
Asbury University	Wilmore, Kentucky	1890	Christian	Eagles	2015	2019	Men's lacrosse	C.C. South (CCS)
Asbury University	Wilmore, Kentucky	1890	Christian	Eagles	2015	2021	Women's lacrosse	C.C. South (CCS)
Asbury University	Wilmore, Kentucky	1890	Christian	Eagles	2016	2021	Men's swimming & diving	C.C. South (CCS)
Asbury University	Wilmore, Kentucky	1890	Christian	Eagles	2016	2021	Women's swimming & diving	C.C. South (CCS)
University of the Cumberlands (Note: Cumberlands (Ky) remains in the AAC as an affiliate member for men's lacrosse.)	Williamsburg, Kentucky	1887	Nondenominational	Patriots	2015	2018	Women's lacrosse	Mid-South (MSC)

=== Membership timeline ===
Full member (non-football) Associate member (sport)

== Conference sports ==
The Appalachian Athletic Conference currently fields 24 sports (13 men's and 11 women's):

Conference sports
Sport	Men's	Women's
Baseball	✓	
Basketball	✓	✓
Cross country	✓	✓
Football	✓	
Golf	✓	✓
Lacrosse	✓	✓
Soccer	✓	✓
Softball		✓
Swimming	✓	✓
Tennis	✓	✓
Track & field outdoor	✓	✓
Track & field indoor	✓	✓
Volleyball	✓	✓
Wrestling	✓	
