= Truett McConnell Bears =

Truett McConer Bears
- University: Truett McConnell University
- Association: NAIA
- Conference: AAC (primary)
- Athletic director: Jenni Shepard
- Location: Cleveland, Georgia
- Varsity teams: 23 (9 men's, 10 women's, 4 co-ed)
- Basketball arena: Benjamin F. Brady Arena
- Baseball stadium: TMU Baseball Complex
- Softball stadium: TMU Softball Complex
- Soccer stadium: TMU Soccer/Lacrosse Complex
- Lacrosse stadium: TMU Soccer/Lacrosse Complex
- Tennis venue: TMU Tennis Complex
- Nickname: Bears
- Colors: Navy, Gold, and Light Blue
- Website: tmbears.com
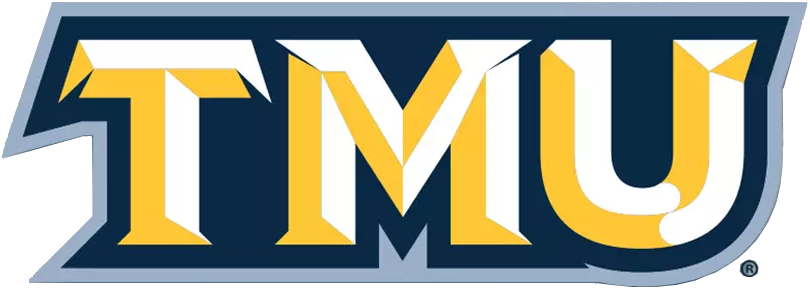

The Truett McConnell Bears are the athletic teams that represent Truett McConnell University, located in Cleveland, Georgia, in intercollegiate sports as a member of the National Association of Intercollegiate Athletics (NAIA), primarily competing in the Appalachian Athletic Conference (AAC) since the 2013–14 academic year. The Bears previously competed in the Southern States Athletic Conference (SSAC; formerly known as Georgia–Alabama–Carolina Conference (GACC) until after the 2003–04 school year) from 2010–11 to 2012–13; as well as an NAIA Independent within the Association of Independent Institutions (AII) during the 2009–10 school year (when the school joined the NAIA).

== Conference affiliations ==
NAIA

- Association of Independent Institutions (2009–2010)
- Southern States Athletic Conference (2010–2013)
- Appalachian Athletic Conference (2013–present)

College Disc Golf

- Southeast Conference (2023-present)

== Varsity teams ==
TMU competes in 22 intercollegiate varsity sports:

Men's sports	Women's sports
Baseball	Basketball
Basketball	Beach volleyball
Cross country	Cross country
Golf	Golf
Soccer	Lacrosse
Tennis	Soccer
Track and field	Softball
Volleyball	Tennis
Wrestling	Track and field
	Volleyball
Co-ed sports
Cycling
Disc golf
Pickleball
Shooting

== Nickname ==
The initial nickname of TMU's athletic teams, "The Mountaineers," was changed to "Danes" in 1965, and is now the "Bears".

== Notable people ==
Mitchell Wiggins, NBA player and father of NBA player Andrew Wiggins, played basketball at Truett McConnell from 1978 to 1979
