= Kentucky Christian University =

Christian university in Grayson, Kentucky, US

- Former names: Christian Normal Institute (1919–1944); Kentucky Christian College (1944–2004)
- Type: Private university
- Established: 1919
- Religious affiliation: Christian churches and churches of Christ
- President: Terry Allcorn
- Students: 500
- Location: Grayson, Kentucky, United States; 38.341°N 82.947°W
- Colors: Red & Black
- Sporting affiliations: NAIA – Appalachian; NCCAA – Division II Mid-East
- Mascots: Knights and Lady Knights
- Website: www.kcu.edu

Kentucky Christian University (KCU) is a private Christian university in Grayson, Kentucky, United States.

== History ==
It was founded on December 1, 1919, as Christian Normal Institute, by J. W. Lusby and J. O. Snodgrass. As a normal school its programs included a high school, a junior college, and a training program for public school teachers. During the early 1920s its emphasis shifted to educating students for the Christian ministry.

== Academics ==
Degree programs are offered in six schools within the university and are accredited by the Commission on Colleges of the Southern Association of Colleges and Schools and is authorized to award bachelor's and master's degrees.

== Athletics ==
The Kentucky Christian athletic teams are called the Knights and Lady Knights. The university is a member of the National Association of Intercollegiate Athletics (NAIA), primarily competing in the Appalachian Athletic Conference (AAC) since the 2019–20 academic year. They were also a member of the National Christian College Athletic Association (NCCAA), primarily competing as an independent in the Mid-East Region of the Division II level. The Knights and Lady Knights previously competed as an NAIA Independent within the Association of Independent Institutions (AII) from 2008–09 (when the school joined the NAIA) to 2018–19.

Kentucky Christian competes in 17 intercollegiate varsity sports: Men's sports include baseball, basketball, cross country, football, golf, soccer and track & field; while women's sports include basketball, cheerleading, cross country, golf, soccer, softball, track and field and volleyball; and co-ed sports compete in archery, bass fishing and cheerleading.

The Men's Basketball Team has won 7 NCCAA Division II National Championships since 1988. The women's basketball team has won 15 NCCAA Division II National Championships since 1989.

== Notable alumni ==
Several contemporary Christian music groups have come from KCU, including Audio Adrenaline and Bleach.
