= Truett McConnell University =

Baptist college in Cleveland, Georgia, US

- Former name: Truett-McConnell College (1946–2016)
- Type: Private college
- Established: 1946; 80 years ago (first classes offered: September 1947)
- Religious affiliation: Georgia Baptist Convention
- President: Larry W. Lyon
- Students: 2,141 (on campus/online)
- Location: Cleveland, Georgia, United States; 34.596°N 83.748°W
- Campus: 225 acres
- Colors: Navy Blue & Gold
- Sporting affiliations: NAIA – Appalachian
- Mascot: Bears
- Website: www.truett.edu

Truett McConnell University is a private Baptist college in Cleveland, Georgia. It is operated under the auspices of the Georgia Baptist Convention and controlled by a board of trustees elected by the convention. It was named to honor George W. Truett and Fernando C. McConnell.

== History ==
On July 23, 1946, the Georgia Baptist Convention held ceremonies at Cleveland, Georgia, to mark the establishment of a new two-year liberal arts college named for Truett and McConnell. Truett-McConnell College, operating in temporary quarters on or near the town square in Cleveland, first opened in September 1947, when it enrolled a class of 55 students. The school was first accredited in 1966 to issue two year degrees. In December 2002, the institution was approved by the Southern Association of Colleges and Schools to offer four-year degrees.

In the fall of 2003, a Bachelor of Arts in music and a Bachelor of Arts in music with a concentration in church music degree program was added, which was followed by the December 2005 approval for a Bachelor of Arts in Christian Studies and a Bachelor of Science in education with a concentration in early childhood education. Truett McConnell University offers thirteen bachelor's degrees with various concentrations in the fields of Business, Christian Studies, English, Education, History, Humanities, Music, and Science. The most recent degree to be approved by SACS is the Bachelor of Arts in World Missions, now referred to as Bachelor of Arts in Global Studies. In the spring of 2010, Truett-McConnell College received approval from SACS to offer online degrees in Business and Christian Studies.

Enrollment declined from 2033 in 2000 to 468 in 2008 (due to the closure of its satellite campuses); then the trend was reversed. In fall of 2010, the school saw its largest enrollment of 751 students, increasing its enrollment by 62% since 2008. In Fall of 2010, Truett-McConnell College announced a new building project, the largest building project in 40 years. It included additions to the Miller Building, a new dorm that would sleep 173 students, as well as an addition to the current dining hall. Ground breaking began late 2010 and construction started in early 2011. The current enrollment is over 2100 students, including residents, commuters, online, and ACCEL students. The administration broke ground in 2015 on the site of the new Student Recreation Center, set for completion in 2016. Following this project, a new chapel and fine arts facility will be underway as well as a new academic building.

In 2016, the institution's leaders changed the name of Truett-McConnell College to Truett McConnell University.

On May 29, 2025, a report accused President Emir Caner of ignoring complaints of sexual abuse of a student by Vice President Bradley Reynolds. About a week later, the college's board of trustees put president Emir Caner on administrative leave, with John Yarbrough acting as president until a third-party could conduct an investigation. Effective April 1, 2026, Larry W. Lyon became president.

== Athletics ==
The Truett McConnell (TMU) athletic teams are called the Bears. The institution is a member of the National Association of Intercollegiate Athletics (NAIA), primarily competing in the Appalachian Athletic Conference (AAC) since the 2013–14 academic year. The Bears previously competed in the Southern States Athletic Conference (SSAC; formerly known as Georgia–Alabama–Carolina Conference (GACC) until after the 2003–04 school year) from 2010–11 to 2012–13; as well as an NAIA Independent within the Association of Independent Institutions (AII) during the 2009–10 school year (when the school joined the NAIA).

TMU competes in 22 intercollegiate varsity sports: Men's sports include baseball, basketball, cross country, golf, soccer, tennis, track & field, volleyball and wrestling; while women's sports include basketball, beach volleyball, cross country, golf, lacrosse, soccer, softball, tennis, track & field and volleyball; and life sports include competitive gaming, cycling and shooting sports.

=== Nickname ===
The initial nickname of TMU's athletic teams, "The Mountaineers," was changed to "Danes" in 1965, and is now the "Bears".

== Notable alumni ==
Name	Known for	Relationship to Truett-McConnell
Matt Papa	Christian recording artist	BA, 2005; First two four-year degree graduates.
Xavier Roberts	Created the Cabbage Patch Kids toy line	studied art at Truett-McConnell
Mitchell Wiggins	NBA player and father of professional basketball player Andrew Wiggins	played basketball at Truett-McConnell from 1978 to 1979
