= 2018 NAIA baseball tournament =

- Teams: 46
- Finals site: Harris Field; Lewiston, Idaho
- Champions: Southeastern (FL) (1st title)
- Winning coach: Adrian Dinkel
- MVP: Manuel Mesa (Southeastern)

The 2018 NAIA baseball tournament was the 62nd edition of the NAIA baseball championship. The 46-team tournament began on May 14 with Opening Round games across nine different sites and concluded with the 2018 NAIA World Series in Lewiston, Idaho that began on May 25 and ended on May 31. Southeastern (FL) defeated Freed–Hardeman (TN) 6–3 in the championship game for their first title in program history and becoming the most recent team to win the NAIA baseball championship in their first World Series appearance. This was also the most recent championship game in which both teams were making their very first NAIA World Series appearance.

The 46 participating teams were selected from all eligible NAIA teams with the World Series host receiving an automatic bid to the NAIA World Series. The remaining 45 teams participated in the Opening Round with 31 teams being awarded automatic bids as either champions and/or runners-up of their conferences, and 14 teams were selected at-large by the National Selection Committee. Teams were then placed into one of nine pre-determined Opening Round sites of five teams a piece, each of which is conducted via a double-elimination tournament. The winners of each of the Opening Round sites plus the World Series host team participated in the NAIA World Series.

== Tournament procedure ==
A total of 46 teams entered the tournament. As World Series host, Lewis–Clark State received an automatic bid into the NAIA World Series. 31 automatic bids were determined by either winning their conference's regular season championship, conference tournament, and/or conference tournament runner-up. The other 14 bids were at-large, with selections determined by the NAIA Baseball National Selection Committee.

== Opening round hosts ==
On May 1, the NAIA announced the nine opening round host sites, which were played from May 14–17.

Opening Round hosts

Venue(s)	Location(s)	Host(s)
Bowling Green Ballpark	Bowling Green, KY	Bowling Green CVB
Doyle Buhl Stadium	Williamsburg, KY	University of the Cumberlands
Harrison Field	Montgomery, AL	Faulkner University
Grizzly Baseball Complex	Lawrenceville, GA	Georgia Gwinnett College
Jim Wade Stadium	Oklahoma City, OK	Oklahoma City University
McBean Stadium	Lincoln, CA	Placer Valley Tourism; William Jessup University
Winterholter Field	Upland, IN	Taylor University
Hunter Wright Stadium	Kingsport, TN	Visit Kingsport
Milton Wheeler Field	Hattiesburg, MS	William Carey University

== Bids ==
=== Automatic ===
School	Conference	Record	Berth	Last NAIA Appearance
Antelope Valley (CA)	NAIA West Group	41–11–1	Regular season champion	2017 (Bellevue Bracket)
Bellevue (NE)	North Star	37–21	Tournament champion	2017 (Bellevue Bracket)
British Columbia	NAIA West Group	28–24	Tournament runner-up	2016 (Lawrenceville Bracket)
Campbellsville (KY)	Mid-South	36–15	Tournament champion	2017 (Oklahoma City Bracket)
Central Methodist (MO)	Heart	40–14	Tournament runner-up	2017 (Lawrenceville Bracket)
Clarke (IA)	Heart	35–21–1	Tournament champion	2017 (Hutchinson Bracket)
Freed–Hardeman (TN)	American Midwest	40–14	Tournament champion	2016 (Savannah Bracket)
Georgia Gwinnett	A.I.I.	45–10	Tournament runner-up	2017 (Lawrenceville Bracket)
Indiana Tech	Wolverine-Hoosier	42–19	Regular season champion	2017 (Bartlesville Bracket)
Indiana Wesleyan	Crossroads	37–18	Regular season champion	2016 (Montgomery Bracket)
IU–Southeast	River States	40–12	Regular season champion	2017 (Kingsport Bracket)
Judson (IL)	Chicagoland	35–18	Regular season champion	2017 (Bellevue Bracket)
Lewis-Clark State (ID)	NAIA West Group	38–11	World Series host	2017 NAIA World Series
LSU–Alexandria	Red River	32–25	Tournament champion	2017 (Hattiesburg Bracket)
LSU–Shreveport	Red River	39–20	Regular season champion	2017 (Lawrenceville Bracket)
Lyon (AR)	American Midwest	36–15	Regular season champion	2017 (Hattiesburg Bracket)
Madonna (MI)	Wolverine-Hoosier	36–16	Tournament runner-up	2016 (Santa Barbara Bracket)
Marian (IN)	Crossroads	24–25	Tournament champion	2017 (Kingsport Bracket)
Middle Georgia State	Southern States	45–16	Tournament champion	2017 (Lima Bracket)
Midland (NE)	Great Plains	32–20	Tournament runner-up	2017 (Bartlesville Bracket)
Northwestern (IA)	Great Plains	30–18	Regular season champion	2014 (Shawnee Bracket)
Oklahoma City	Sooner	47–7	Tournament runner-up	2017 NAIA World Series
Oklahoma Wesleyan	Kansas	51–6	Regular season champion	2017 NAIA World Series
Point (GA)	Appalachian	34–23	Tournament champion	2016 (Savannah Bracket)
Point Park (PA)	River States	45–7	Tournament champion	2014 (Marion Bracket)
Science & Arts (OK)	Sooner	45–6	Tournament champion	2017 NAIA World Series
Talladega (AL)	A.I.I.	27–22	Tournament champion	2017 (Kingsport Bracket)
Tennessee Wesleyan	Appalachian	37–19	Tournament runner-up	2017 (Kingsport Bracket)
Trinity Christian (IL)	Chicagoland	34–21	Regular season champion	2013 (Joliet Bracket)
Webber International (FL)	The Sun	35–22	Tournament champion	2017 (Lawrenceville Bracket)
William Jessup (CA)	Golden State	38–15	Tournament champion	First appearance
York (NE)	Kansas	29–21	Tournament runner-up	2016 (Grand Rapids Bracket)

=== At–Large ===
School	Conference	Record	Last NAIA Appearance
Bryan (TN)	Appalachian	40–15	2017 (Bartlesville Bracket)
Cumberland (TN)	Mid-South	34–19	2014 NAIA World Series
Cumberlands (KY)	Mid-South	46–9	2017 (Montgomery Bracket)
Faulkner (AL)	Southern States	50–7	2017 NAIA World Series
Jamestown (ND)	North Star	41–9	2017 (Hutchinson Bracket)
Keiser (FL)	The Sun	37–17	2017 NAIA World Series
Mobile (AL)	Southern States	42–15	First appearance
Northwestern Ohio	Wolverine-Hoosier	38–18	2017 (Lima Bracket)
Reinhardt (GA)	Appalachian	38–17	First appearance
Southeastern (FL)	The Sun	51–7	2017 (Hattiesburg Bracket)
St. Thomas (FL)	The Sun	53–7	2017 (Montgomery Bracket)
Taylor (IN)	Crossroads	43–14	2016 (Savannah Bracket)
Westmont (CA)	Golden State	34–16	2016 (Santa Barbara Bracket)
William Carey (MS)	Southern States	33–23	2017 NAIA World Series

== Opening Round ==
=== Bowling Green Bracket ===
Hosted by the Bowling Green CVB at Bowling Green Ballpark

First round
4	Bellevue (NE)	7
5	Midland (NE)	1
First round
5	Midland	5
2	Campbellsville	11

Second round
1	Science & Arts (OK)	15
4	Bellevue	5
2	Campbellsville (KY)	3
3	Reinhardt (GA)	8
Second round
4	Bellevue	7
2	Campbellsville	9

Semifinals
1	Science & Arts	6
3	Reinhardt	7^{10}
Semifinals
1	Science & Arts	5
2	Campbellsville	7

Finals
3	Reinhardt	7	5
2	Campbellsville	10^{10}	1

=== Hattiesburg Bracket ===
Hosted by William Carey (MS) at Milton Wheeler Field

First round
4	LSU–Shreveport	10
5	William Carey (MS)	11^{10}
First round
4	LSU–Shreveport	8
2	Westmont (CA)	7

Second round
1	St. Thomas (FL)	8
5	William Carey	2
2	Westmont (CA)	1
3	IU–Southeast	11
Second round
5	William Carey	13
4	LSU–Shreveport	5

Semifinals
1	St. Thomas (FL)	6
3	IU–Southeast	1
Semifinals
3	IU–Southeast	2
5	William Carey	6

Finals
1	St. Thomas (FL)	6	–
5	William Carey	3	–

=== Kingsport Bracket ===
Hosted by Visit Kingsport at Hunter Wright Stadium

First round
4	Clarke (IA)	7
5	Trinity Christian (IL)	4
First round
5	Trinity Christian	7
3	Madonna	6

Second round
1	Southeastern (FL)	8
4	Clarke	6
2	Tennessee Wesleyan	11
3	Madonna (MI)	2
Second round
4	Clarke	8
5	Trinity Christian	1

Semifinals
1	Southeastern (FL)	5
2	Tennessee Wesleyan	2
Semifinals
2	Tennessee Wesleyan	5
4	Clarke	4

Finals
1	Southeastern (FL)	7	–
2	Tennessee Wesleyan	4	–

=== Lawrenceville Bracket ===
Hosted by Georgia Gwinnett at Grizzly Baseball Complex

First round
4	Indiana Wesleyan	7
5	Point (GA)	10
First round
4	Indiana Wesleyan	2
2	Lyon	12

Second round
1	Georgia Gwinnett	10
5	Point	0
2	Lyon (AR)	2
3	Keiser (FL)	8
Second round
5	Point	8
2	Lyon	1

Semifinals
1	Georgia Gwinnett	10
3	Keiser	2
Semifinals
3	Keiser	2
5	Point	6

Finals
1	Georgia Gwinnett	13	–
5	Point	0	–

=== Lincoln Bracket ===
Hosted by Placer Valley Tourism & William Jessup (CA) at McBean Stadium

First round
4	Judson (IL)	19
5	British Columbia	8
First round
5	British Columbia	4^{10}
2	Middle Georgia State	3

Second round
1	William Jessup (CA)	12
4	Judson	4
2	Middle Georgia State	6
3	Antelope Valley (CA)	8
Second round
4	Judson	15
5	British Columbia	5

Semifinals
1	William Jessup	3
3	Antelope Valley	4
Semifinals
1	William Jessup	8
4	Judson	1

Finals
3	Antelope Valley	1	16
1	William Jessup	6	15

=== Montgomery Bracket ===
Hosted by Faulkner (AL) at Harrison Field

First round
4	Talladega (AL)	9
5	LSU–Alexandria	0
First round
5	LSU–Alexandria	4
2	Webber International	7

Second round
1	Faulkner (AL)	20
4	Talladega	0
2	Webber International (FL)	5
3	Indiana Tech	10^{10}
Second round
4	Talladega	1
2	Webber International	8

Semifinals
1	Faulkner	7
3	Indiana Tech	2
Semifinals
3	Indiana Tech	1
2	Webber International	2^{11}

Finals
1	Faulkner	10^{13}	–
2	Webber International	7	–

=== Oklahoma City Bracket ===
Hosted by Oklahoma City at Jim Wade Stadium

First round
4	Jamestown (ND)	14
5	York (NE)	4
First round
5	York	8
2	Mobile	5

Second round
1	Oklahoma City	19
4	Jamestown	8
2	Mobile (AL)	3
3	Central Methodist (MO)	5
Second round
4	Jamestown	3
5	York	1

Semifinals
1	Oklahoma City	8
3	Central Methodist	3
Semifinals
3	Central Methodist	1
4	Jamestown	3

Finals
1	Oklahoma City	4	4
4	Jamestown	7	0

=== Upland Bracket ===
Hosted by Taylor (IN) at Winterholter Field

First round
4	Taylor (IN)	2
5	Northwestern (IA)	1
First round
5	Northwestern (IA)	7
3	Cumberland (TN)	8

Second round
1	Oklahoma Wesleyan	13
4	Taylor	2
2	Freed–Hardeman (TN)	13
3	Cumberland (TN)	8
Second round
4	Taylor	2
3	Cumberland (TN)	5

Semifinals
1	Oklahoma Wesleyan	2
2	Freed–Hardeman	3^{14}
Semifinals
1	Oklahoma Wesleyan	3
3	Cumberland (TN)	2

Finals
2	Freed–Hardeman	5	–
1	Oklahoma Wesleyan	0	–

=== Williamsburg Bracket ===
Hosted by Cumberlands (KY) at Doyle Buhl Stadium

First round
4	Northwestern Ohio	7
5	Marian (IN)	3
First round
5	Marian	4
2	Cumberlands (KY)	18

Second round
1	Bryan (TN)	5
4	Northwestern Ohio	10
2	Cumberlands (KY)	2
3	Point Park (PA)	8
Second round
1	Bryan	11
2	Cumberlands (KY)	8

Semifinals
4	Northwestern Ohio	13
3	Point Park	5
Semifinals
3	Point Park	8
1	Bryan	7

Finals
4	Northwestern Ohio	10	–
3	Point Park	1	–

== NAIA World Series ==
The NAIA World Series was held at Harris Field in Lewiston, Idaho.

=== Participants ===
School	Conference	Record	Head Coach	Bracket	Previous NAIA WS Appearances	Best NAIA WS Finish	NAIA WS Record
Antelope Valley (CA)	NAIA West Group (Cal Pac)	44–12–1	Jacob Garsez	Lincoln	none	none	0–0
Faulkner (AL)	Southern States	50–7	Patrick McCarthy	Montgomery	6 (last: 2017)	1st (2013)	17–10
Freed–Hardeman (TN)	American Midwest	47–15	Jonathan Estes	Upland	none	none	0–0
Georgia Gwinnett	A.I.I.	48–10	Brad Stromdahl	Lawrenceville	1 (last: 2014)	T-7th (2014)	1–2
Lewis–Clark State (ID)	NAIA West Group (Frontier)	38–11	Jeremiah Robbins	n/a	36 (last: 2017)	1st (1984, 1985, 1987, 1988, 1989, 1990, 1991, 1992, 1996, 1999, 2000, 2002, 2003, 2006, 2007, 2008, 2015, 2016, 2017)	142–46
Northwestern Ohio	Wolverine-Hoosier	42–18	Kory Hartman	Williamsburg	none	none	0–0
Oklahoma City	Sooner	50–8	Denney Crabaugh	Oklahoma City	15 (last: 2017)	1st (2005)	35–29
Reinhardt (GA)	Appalachian	41–18	Bill Popp	Bowling Green	none	none	0–0
Southeastern (FL)	The Sun	54–7	Adrian Dinkel	Macon	none	none	0–0
St. Thomas (FL)	The Sun	56–7	Jorge Perez	Hattiesburg	5 (last: 2015)	2nd (2015)	7–12

=== Bracket ===
==== Preliminary Bracket ====
First round Friday, May 25
8	Antelope Valley	2
9	Reinhardt	1
7	Freed–Hardeman	6
10	Northwestern Ohio	1
First round Saturday, May 26; Losers eliminated
10	Northwestern Ohio	13
3	St. Thomas (FL)	9
9	Reinhardt	3
4	Oklahoma City	10

First round Friday, May 25; Second round Saturday, May 26; Sunday, May 27
1	Faulkner	8
8	Antelope Valley	7
4	Oklahoma City	3
5	Southeastern	8
2	Georgia Gwinnett	3
7	Freed–Hardeman	5
3	St. Thomas (FL)	5
6	Lewis–Clark State	6
Second round Monday, May 28; Losers eliminated
8	Antelope Valley	15
10	Northwestern Ohio	4
2	Georgia Gwinnett	13
4	Oklahoma City	3

Third round Monday, May 28; Winners to Championship Bracket
1	Faulkner	4
5	Southeastern	6
7	Freed–Hardeman	5
6	Lewis–Clark State	4
Third round Tuesday, May 29; Winners to Championship Bracket
6	Lewis–Clark State	5
8	Antelope Valley	3
1	Faulkner	9
2	Georgia Gwinnett	20

Fourth Round; Tuesday, May 29
5	Southeastern	8
7	Freed–Hardeman	1

==== Championship Bracket ====
Semifinals; Wednesday, May 30
5	Southeastern	9
6	Lewis–Clark State	6
2	Georgia Gwinnett	7
7	Freed–Hardeman	11

Final; Thursday, May 31
5	Southeastern	6	–
7	Freed–Hardeman	3	–

=== Game Results ===
All game times are listed in Pacific Daylight Time (UTC−07:00).

==== Preliminary Bracket ====
Friday, May 25; 8:30 am Game 1	(9) Reinhardt	1–2	(8) Antelope Valley	Harris Field; Attendance: 1840; Umpires: HP: Andy Joseph, 1B: Jason Werle, 2B: Jeff Kopecky, 3B: Grant Henderson
Friday, May 25; 8:30 am Game 1	LP: Dylan Powers (11–4)	Boxscore	WP: Justin Stark (3–1)	Harris Field; Attendance: 1840; Umpires: HP: Andy Joseph, 1B: Jason Werle, 2B: Jeff Kopecky, 3B: Grant Henderson
Friday, May 25; 8:30 am Game 1	HR: Sherman Graves (11)	Boxscore	HR: Tyler Pittmon (10)	Harris Field; Attendance: 1840; Umpires: HP: Andy Joseph, 1B: Jason Werle, 2B: Jeff Kopecky, 3B: Grant Henderson

Friday, May 25; 11:30 am Game 2	(5) Southeastern	8–3	(4) Oklahoma City	Harris Field; Attendance: 660; Umpires: HP: Mike Blinic, 1B: Grant Henderson, 2B: Will Prestwood, 3B: Jason Werle
Friday, May 25; 11:30 am Game 2	WP: Jonathan Bermudez (14–2)	Boxscore	LP: Bryce Milligan (13–3)	Harris Field; Attendance: 660; Umpires: HP: Mike Blinic, 1B: Grant Henderson, 2B: Will Prestwood, 3B: Jason Werle
Friday, May 25; 11:30 am Game 2	HR: Adam De La Cruz (7)	Boxscore		Harris Field; Attendance: 660; Umpires: HP: Mike Blinic, 1B: Grant Henderson, 2B: Will Prestwood, 3B: Jason Werle

Friday, May 25; 3:00 pm Game 3	(7) Freed–Hardeman	6–1	(10) Northwestern Ohio	Harris Field; Attendance: 685; Umpires: HP: Jeff Kopecky, 1B: Bill Powell, 2B: Andy Joseph, 3B: Mike Thomas
Friday, May 25; 3:00 pm Game 3	WP: Austin Steel (11–2)	Boxscore	LP: Mike Alexander (8–3)	Harris Field; Attendance: 685; Umpires: HP: Jeff Kopecky, 1B: Bill Powell, 2B: Andy Joseph, 3B: Mike Thomas
Friday, May 25; 3:00 pm Game 3	HR: Josh Sears (20)	Boxscore	HR: Blake Maines (6)	Harris Field; Attendance: 685; Umpires: HP: Jeff Kopecky, 1B: Bill Powell, 2B: Andy Joseph, 3B: Mike Thomas

Friday, May 25; 7:00 pm Game 4	(3) St. Thomas (FL)	5–6	(6) Lewis–Clark State	Harris Field; Attendance: 3870; Umpires: HP: Will Prestwood, 1B: Mike Thomas, 2B: Mike Blinic, 3B: Bill Powell
Friday, May 25; 7:00 pm Game 4	LP: Orlando Rodriguez (14–1)	Boxscore	WP: Lalo Porras (2–0); Sv: Gage Burland (7)	Harris Field; Attendance: 3870; Umpires: HP: Will Prestwood, 1B: Mike Thomas, 2B: Mike Blinic, 3B: Bill Powell
Friday, May 25; 7:00 pm Game 4	HR: Chris Garabedian (3), Sergio Lopez 2 (15)	Boxscore	HR: Tyler McDowell (6)	Harris Field; Attendance: 3870; Umpires: HP: Will Prestwood, 1B: Mike Thomas, 2B: Mike Blinic, 3B: Bill Powell

Saturday, May 26; 12:00 pm Game 5	(4) Oklahoma City	10–3	(9) Reinhardt	Harris Field; Attendance: 560; Umpires: HP: Mike Thomas, 1B: Mike Blinic, 2B: Grant Henderson, 3B: Andy Joseph
Saturday, May 26; 12:00 pm Game 5	WP: Craig Knoche (7–2)	Boxscore	LP: Jason Gifford (9–4)	Harris Field; Attendance: 560; Umpires: HP: Mike Thomas, 1B: Mike Blinic, 2B: Grant Henderson, 3B: Andy Joseph
Saturday, May 26; 12:00 pm Game 5	HR: Garrett Foster (13)	Boxscore		Harris Field; Attendance: 560; Umpires: HP: Mike Thomas, 1B: Mike Blinic, 2B: Grant Henderson, 3B: Andy Joseph

Saturday, May 26; 3:00 pm Game 6	(10) Northwestern Ohio	13–9	(3) St. Thomas (FL)	Harris Field; Attendance: 1200; Umpires: HP: Bill Powell, 1B: Andy Joseph, 2B: Jason Werle, 3B: Mike Blinic
Saturday, May 26; 3:00 pm Game 6	WP: Mitch Ebben (7–0); Sv: Steven Amos (2)	Boxscore	LP: Erne Valdes (1–3)	Harris Field; Attendance: 1200; Umpires: HP: Bill Powell, 1B: Andy Joseph, 2B: Jason Werle, 3B: Mike Blinic
Saturday, May 26; 3:00 pm Game 6	HR: Felix Correa (4)	Boxscore		Harris Field; Attendance: 1200; Umpires: HP: Bill Powell, 1B: Andy Joseph, 2B: Jason Werle, 3B: Mike Blinic

Saturday, May 26; 6:00 pm Game 7	(8) Antelope Valley	7–8	(1) Faulkner	Harris Field; Umpires: HP: Grant Henderson, 1B: Will Prestwood, 2B: Mike Thomas, 3B: Jeff Kopecky
Saturday, May 26; 6:00 pm Game 7	LP: Clayton Rabiej (11–1)	Boxscore	WP: Tyler Tungate (9–0); Sv: Jonathan Wilkins (2)	Harris Field; Umpires: HP: Grant Henderson, 1B: Will Prestwood, 2B: Mike Thomas, 3B: Jeff Kopecky
Saturday, May 26; 6:00 pm Game 7	HR: Jake Harrison (7), Tyler Pittmon (11)	Boxscore	HR: Reese Cooley (14), Jacob Freeland (4), Austin Paschke (13)	Harris Field; Umpires: HP: Grant Henderson, 1B: Will Prestwood, 2B: Mike Thomas, 3B: Jeff Kopecky

Sunday, May 27; 1:30 pm Game 8	(2) Georgia Gwinnett	3–5	(7) Freed–Hardeman	Harris Field; Attendance: 890; Umpires: HP: Jason Werle, 1B: Jeff Kopecky, 2B: Bill Powell, 3B: Will Prestwood
Sunday, May 27; 1:30 pm Game 8	LP: Matthew Swain (0–2)	Boxscore	WP: Jared Humphry (8–3); Sv: Beau Caviness (17)	Harris Field; Attendance: 890; Umpires: HP: Jason Werle, 1B: Jeff Kopecky, 2B: Bill Powell, 3B: Will Prestwood

Monday, May 28; 8:30 am Game 9	(4) Oklahoma City	3–13	(2) Georgia Gwinnett	Harris Field; Attendance: 590; Umpires: HP: Andy Joseph, 1B: Will Prestwood, 2B: Jeff Kopecky, 3B: Jason Werle
Monday, May 28; 8:30 am Game 9	LP: J.R. Holloway (9–1)	Boxscore	WP: Gregory Loukinen (7–1)	Harris Field; Attendance: 590; Umpires: HP: Andy Joseph, 1B: Will Prestwood, 2B: Jeff Kopecky, 3B: Jason Werle
Monday, May 28; 8:30 am Game 9	HR: Elliott Cary (10)	Boxscore	HR: Chris Jones (4), Kade Carrigan (3)	Harris Field; Attendance: 590; Umpires: HP: Andy Joseph, 1B: Will Prestwood, 2B: Jeff Kopecky, 3B: Jason Werle

Monday, May 28; 11:30 am Game 10	(8) Antelope Valley	15–4	(10) Northwestern Ohio	Harris Field; Attendance: 445; Umpires: HP: Mike Thomas, 1B: Jason Werle, 2B: Mike Blinic, 3B: Will Prestwood
Monday, May 28; 11:30 am Game 10	WP: Jesse Garcia (8–4)	Boxscore	LP: Brett McEldowney (5–4)	Harris Field; Attendance: 445; Umpires: HP: Mike Thomas, 1B: Jason Werle, 2B: Mike Blinic, 3B: Will Prestwood
Monday, May 28; 11:30 am Game 10	HR: Jake Harrison (8)	Boxscore	HR: Misael Lebron (6), Junior Gomez (9)	Harris Field; Attendance: 445; Umpires: HP: Mike Thomas, 1B: Jason Werle, 2B: Mike Blinic, 3B: Will Prestwood

Monday, May 28; 3:00 pm Game 11	(1) Faulkner	4–6	(5) Southeastern	Harris Field; Attendance: 1930; Umpires: HP: Jeff Kopecky, 1B: Bill Powell, 2B: Andy Joseph, 3B: Grant Henderson
Monday, May 28; 3:00 pm Game 11	LP: Tyler Thornton (7–1)	Boxscore	WP: Jordan Scott (14–1); Sv: Jared Crescentini (5)	Harris Field; Attendance: 1930; Umpires: HP: Jeff Kopecky, 1B: Bill Powell, 2B: Andy Joseph, 3B: Grant Henderson

Monday, May 28; 6:30 pm Game 12	(6) Lewis–Clark State	4–5	(7) Freed–Hardeman	Harris Field; Attendance: 4660; Umpires: HP: Mike Blinic, 1B: Grant Henderson, 2B: Mike Thomas, 3B: Bill Powell
Monday, May 28; 6:30 pm Game 12	LP: Tyler Birch (9–2)	Boxscore	WP: Jacob Sawyers (8–1); Sv: Beau Caviness (18)	Harris Field; Attendance: 4660; Umpires: HP: Mike Blinic, 1B: Grant Henderson, 2B: Mike Thomas, 3B: Bill Powell
Monday, May 28; 6:30 pm Game 12	HR: Kyle Callahan (10)	Boxscore		Harris Field; Attendance: 4660; Umpires: HP: Mike Blinic, 1B: Grant Henderson, 2B: Mike Thomas, 3B: Bill Powell

Tuesday, May 29; 11:00 am Game 13	(2) Georgia Gwinnett	20–9	(1) Faulkner	Harris Field; Attendance: 505; Umpires: HP: Will Prestwood, 1B: Mike Thomas, 2B: Andy Joseph, 3B: Jeff Kopecky
Tuesday, May 29; 11:00 am Game 13	WP: Cole Uvila (4–2)	Boxscore	LP: Alex Carrillo (10–3)	Harris Field; Attendance: 505; Umpires: HP: Will Prestwood, 1B: Mike Thomas, 2B: Andy Joseph, 3B: Jeff Kopecky
Tuesday, May 29; 11:00 am Game 13	HR: Brandon Frazier (2), Kade Carrigan (4)	Boxscore	HR: Tekwaan Whyte (4), Ryan Rosa (6), Reese Cooley (15), Gage West (6), Austin Paschke (14), Reid Long (8)	Harris Field; Attendance: 505; Umpires: HP: Will Prestwood, 1B: Mike Thomas, 2B: Andy Joseph, 3B: Jeff Kopecky

Tuesday, May 29; 3:00 pm Game 14	(6) Lewis–Clark State	5–3	(8) Antelope Valley	Harris Field; Attendance: 2150; Umpires: HP: Jason Werle, 1B: Bill Powell, 2B: Mike Thomas, 3B: Andy Joseph
Tuesday, May 29; 3:00 pm Game 14	WP: Tyler Birch (10–2); Sv: Gage Burland (8)	Boxscore	LP: Gilberto Arroyo (4–3)	Harris Field; Attendance: 2150; Umpires: HP: Jason Werle, 1B: Bill Powell, 2B: Mike Thomas, 3B: Andy Joseph
Tuesday, May 29; 3:00 pm Game 14	HR: Cory Voss (11)	Boxscore		Harris Field; Attendance: 2150; Umpires: HP: Jason Werle, 1B: Bill Powell, 2B: Mike Thomas, 3B: Andy Joseph

Tuesday, May 29; 6:30 pm Game 15	(7) Freed–Hardeman	1–8	(5) Southeastern	Harris Field; Attendance: 2190; Umpires: HP: Grant Henderson, 1B: Jeff Kopecky, 2B: Will Prestwood, 3B: Mike Blinic
Tuesday, May 29; 6:30 pm Game 15	LP: Austin Steel (11–3)	Boxscore	WP: Felix Dieguez (7–2)	Harris Field; Attendance: 2190; Umpires: HP: Grant Henderson, 1B: Jeff Kopecky, 2B: Will Prestwood, 3B: Mike Blinic
Tuesday, May 29; 6:30 pm Game 15		Boxscore	HR: Dan Valerio (17)	Harris Field; Attendance: 2190; Umpires: HP: Grant Henderson, 1B: Jeff Kopecky, 2B: Will Prestwood, 3B: Mike Blinic

==== Championship Bracket ====
Wednesday, May 30; 3:05 pm Game 16	(7) Freed–Hardeman	11–7	(2) Georgia Gwinnett	Harris Field; Attendance: 1005; Umpires: HP: Bill Powell, 1B: Mike Thomas, 2B: Jeff Kopecky, 3B: Will Prestwood, LF: Mike Blinic, RF: Andy Joseph
Wednesday, May 30; 3:05 pm Game 16	WP: Connor Creasy (9–0)	Boxscore	LP: Jonathan McKinney (4–2)	Harris Field; Attendance: 1005; Umpires: HP: Bill Powell, 1B: Mike Thomas, 2B: Jeff Kopecky, 3B: Will Prestwood, LF: Mike Blinic, RF: Andy Joseph
Wednesday, May 30; 3:05 pm Game 16	HR: De'Mikyle Holmes (4)	Boxscore	HR: Jordan Tylski (3)	Harris Field; Attendance: 1005; Umpires: HP: Bill Powell, 1B: Mike Thomas, 2B: Jeff Kopecky, 3B: Will Prestwood, LF: Mike Blinic, RF: Andy Joseph

Wednesday, May 30; 6:35 pm Game 17	(5) Southeastern	6–8	(6) Lewis–Clark State	Harris Field; Attendance: 2210; Umpires: HP: Andy Joseph, 1B: Will Prestwood, 2B: Jason Werle, 3B: Mike Thomas, LF: Jeff Kopecky, RF: Bill Powell
Wednesday, May 30; 6:35 pm Game 17	WP: Jonathan Bermudez (15–5); Sv: Jared Crescentini (6)	Boxscore	LP: Lalo Porras (2–1)	Harris Field; Attendance: 2210; Umpires: HP: Andy Joseph, 1B: Will Prestwood, 2B: Jason Werle, 3B: Mike Thomas, LF: Jeff Kopecky, RF: Bill Powell
Wednesday, May 30; 6:35 pm Game 17	HR: Adam De La Cruz (8)	Boxscore	HR: Matt Thompson (5)	Harris Field; Attendance: 2210; Umpires: HP: Andy Joseph, 1B: Will Prestwood, 2B: Jason Werle, 3B: Mike Thomas, LF: Jeff Kopecky, RF: Bill Powell

==== Championship Game ====
Thursday, May 31 6:35 pm PDT at Harris Field Game 18
Team	1	2	3	4	5	6	7	8	9	R	H	E
Southeastern	0	0	0	5	0	0	0	1	0	6	10	0
Freed–Hardeman	1	0	0	0	0	2	0	0	0	3	6	2
WP: Eddie Jimenez (3–0) LP: Jared Humphry (8–4) Sv: Heibert Romero (7); Home runs: SEU: Ivan Nunez (7); FHU: Josh Sears (21), De'Mikyle Holmes (5); Attendance: 1115; Umpires: HP: Grant Henderson, 1B: Jason Werle, 2B: Mike Thomas, 3B: Jeff Kopecky, LF: Will Prestwood, RF: Andy Joseph; Boxscore

== See also ==
- 2018 NAIA softball tournament
- 2018 NCAA Division I baseball tournament
- 2018 NCAA Division II baseball tournament
- 2018 NCAA Division III baseball tournament
