= 2017 NAIA baseball tournament =

- Teams: 46
- Finals site: Harris Field; Lewiston, Idaho
- Champions: Lewis–Clark State (ID) (19th title)
- Winning coach: Jeremiah Robbins
- MVP: J.J. Robinson (Lewis–Clark State)

The 2017 NAIA baseball tournament was the 61st edition of the NAIA baseball championship. The 46-team tournament began on May 15 with Opening Round games across nine different sites and concluded with the 2017 NAIA World Series in Lewiston, Idaho that began on May 26 and ended on June 2. In a rematch of the previous year's championship game, Lewis–Clark State (ID) defeated Faulkner (AL) 6–4 in a winner-take-all championship game for their third straight title and their 19th title in program history. Faulkner forced a winner-take-all championship with a 6–5 victory over Lewis–Clark State the night before.

The 46 participating teams were selected from all eligible NAIA teams with the World Series host receiving an automatic bid to the NAIA World Series. The remaining 45 teams participated in the Opening Round with 30 teams being awarded automatic bids as either champions and/or runners-up of their conferences, and 15 teams were selected at-large by the National Selection Committee. Teams were then placed into one of nine pre-determined Opening Round sites of five teams a piece, each of which is conducted via a double-elimination tournament. The winners of each of the Opening Round sites plus the World Series host team participated in the NAIA World Series.

== Tournament procedure ==
A total of 46 teams entered the tournament. As World Series host, Lewis–Clark State received an automatic bid into the NAIA World Series. 30 automatic bids were determined by either winning their conference's regular season championship, conference tournament, and/or conference tournament runner-up. The other 15 bids were at-large, with selections determined by the NAIA Baseball National Selection Committee.

== Opening round hosts ==
On May 1, the NAIA announced the nine opening round host sites, which were played from May 15–18.

Opening Round hosts

Venue(s)	Location(s)	Host(s)
Don Roddy Field	Bellevue, NE	Bellevue University
Harrison Field	Montgomery, AL	Faulkner University
Grizzly Baseball Field	Lawrenceville, GA	Georgia Gwinnett College
Hunter Wright Stadium	Kingsport, TN	Kingsport CVB; Appalachian Athletic Conference
St. Rita's Sports Complex	Lima, OH	University of Northwestern Ohio
Jim Wade Stadium	Oklahoma City, OK	Oklahoma City University
Bill Doenges Memorial Stadium	Bartlesville, OK	Oklahoma Wesleyan University
Hobart-Detter Field; Rice Field	Hutchinson, KS	Tabor College
Milton Wheeler Field	Hattiesburg, MS	William Carey University

== Bids ==
=== Automatic ===
School	Conference	Record	Berth	Last NAIA Appearance
Antelope Valley (CA)	Cal Pac	36–16	Regular season champion	First appearance
Bellevue (NE)	North Star	49–9	Regular season champion	2016 NAIA World Series
Clarke (IA)	Heart	45–12	Tournament runner-up	2016 (Grand Rapids Bracket)
College of Idaho	NAIA West Group	24–28	Tournament champion	2016 (Santa Barbara Bracket)
Concordia (NE)	Great Plains	33–20	Regular season champion	First appearance
Cumberlands (KY)	Mid-South	42–13	Tournament champion	First appearance
Davenport (MI)	Wolverine-Hoosier	41–15	Tournament runner-up	2016 (Grand Rapids Bracket)
Faulkner (AL)	Southern States	47–10	Tournament champion	2016 NAIA World Series
Georgia Gwinnett	A.I.I.	38–19	Tournament champion	2016 (Lawrenceville Bracket)
Huntington (IN)	Crossroads	33–11	Regular season champion	2011 (Montgomery Bracket)
Judson (IL)	Chicagoland	37–18	Regular season champion	2015 (Kingsport Bracket)
Lewis-Clark State (ID)	NAIA West Group	35–15	World Series host	2016 NAIA World Series
LSU–Alexandria	Red River	33–22	Regular season champion	2015 (Kingsport Bracket)
LSU–Shreveport	Red River	38–19	Tournament champion	2016 (Montgomery Bracket)
Lyon (AR)	American Midwest	34–22	Tournament champion	2015 (Montgomery Bracket)
Marian (IN)	Crossroads	29–21	Tournament runner-up	First appearance
Mayville State (ND)	North Star	46–10	Tournament champion	2016 (Hutchinson Bracket)
MidAmerica Nazarene (KS)	Heart	34–18	Tournament champion	2015 (Shawnee Bracket)
Midland (NE)	Great Plains	40–18	Tournament champion	2016 (Jamestown Bracket)
Midway (KY)	River States	28–28	Tournament champion	First appearance
Missouri Baptist	American Midwest	41–14	Tournament champion	2016 (Jamestown Bracket)
Northwestern Ohio	Wolverine-Hoosier	43–10	Regular season champion	2015 (Santa Clarita Bracket)
Oklahoma City	Sooner	45–8	Tournament champion	2015 (Oklahoma City Bracket)
Oklahoma Wesleyan	Kansas	48–9	Regular season champion	2015 (Grand Rapids Bracket)
Southeastern (FL)	The Sun	48–9	Tournament champion	2015 (Daytona Beach Bracket)
St. Ambrose (IA)	Chicagoland	28–23	Tournament champion	First appearance
Tabor (KS)	Kansas	41–15	Tournament runner-up	2016 (Hutchinson Bracket)
Talladega (AL)	A.I.I.	36–22	Tournament runner-up	2014 (Daytona Beach Bracket)
Tennessee Wesleyan	Appalachian	39–18	Tournament champion	2016 NAIA World Series
The Master's (CA)	Golden State	35–21	Tournament champion	2016 NAIA World Series
Truett McConnell (GA)	Appalachian	31–26	Tournament runner-up	First appearance

=== At–Large ===
School	Conference	Record	Last NAIA Appearance
Bryan (TN)	Appalachian	37–18	2015 (Daytona Beach Bracket)
Campbellsville (KY)	Mid-South	33–19	2016 (Savannah Bracket)
Central Methodist (MO)	Heart	42–16	2016 (Faulkner Bracket)
Friends (KS)	Kansas	31–20	2014 (Shawnee Bracket)
Hope International (CA)	Golden State	32–15	First appearance
IU–Southeast	River States	45–13	2016 (Lawrenceville Bracket)
Indiana Tech	Wolverine-Hoosier	41–12	2016 (Kingsport Bracket)
Jamestown (ND)	North Star	40–19	2016 (Jamestown Bracket)
Keiser (FL)	The Sun	39–18	2016 (Montgomery Bracket)
Middle Georgia State	Southern States	43–14	2016 (Kingsport Bracket)
Science & Arts (OK)	Sooner	41–15	2016 NAIA World Series
St. Thomas (FL)	The Sun	35–17	2016 (Kingsport Bracket)
Texas Wesleyan	Sooner	45–13	2016 (Faulkner Bracket)
Webber International (FL)	The Sun	38–15	First appearance
William Carey (MS)	Southern States	33–23	2016 (Santa Barbara Bracket)

== Opening Round ==
=== Bartlesville Bracket ===
Hosted by Oklahoma Wesleyan at Bill Doenges Memorial Stadium

First round
4	Midland (NE)	10
5	St. Ambrose (IA)	4
First round
5	St. Ambrose	2
3	Bryan	12

Second round
1	Oklahoma Wesleyan	10
4	Midland	5
2	Indiana Tech	17
3	Bryan (TN)	10
Second round
4	Midland	20
3	Bryan	10

Semifinals
1	Oklahoma Wesleyan	15
2	Indiana Tech	14
Semifinals
2	Indiana Tech	25
4	Midland	24

Finals
1	Oklahoma Wesleyan	14	14
2	Indiana Tech	18	6

=== Bellevue Bracket ===
Hosted by Bellevue (NE) at Don Roddy Field

First round
4	Antelope Valley (CA)	14
5	Judson (IL)	9
First round
5	Judson	5
3	Davenport	6

Second round
1	Bellevue (NE)	7
4	Antelope Valley	6
2	Science & Arts (OK)	4
3	Davenport (MI)	2
Second round
4	Antelope Valley	1
3	Davenport	7

Semifinals
1	Bellevue	4
2	Science & Arts	15
Semifinals
1	Bellevue	3
3	Davenport	2

Finals
2	Science & Arts	5	–
1	Bellevue	4	–

=== Hattiesburg Bracket ===
Hosted by William Carey (MS) at Milton Wheeler Field

First round
4	Lyon (AR)	2^{10}
5	LSU–Alexandria	1
First round
5	LSU–Alexandria	1
2	Texas Wesleyan	5

Second round
1	Southeastern (FL)	7
4	Lyon	2
2	Texas Wesleyan	3
3	William Carey (MS)	4
Second round
4	Lyon	1
2	Texas Wesleyan	9

Semifinals
1	Southeastern (FL)	5
3	William Carey	2
Semifinals
3	William Carey	6
2	Texas Wesleyan	5

Finals
1	Southeastern (FL)	4	9
3	William Carey	6^{10}	10

=== Hutchinson Bracket ===
Hosted by Tabor (KS) at Hobart-Detter Field and Rice Field

First round
4	Jamestown (ND)	7
5	Concordia (NE)	8
First round
4	Jamestown	5
3	Tabor	9

Second round
1	Clarke (IA)	19
5	Concordia (NE)	8
2	Missouri Baptist	10
3	Tabor (KS)	5
Second round
5	Concordia (NE)	11
3	Tabor	12

Semifinals
1	Clarke	9
2	Missouri Baptist	13
Semifinals
1	Clarke	7
3	Tabor	8

Finals
2	Missouri Baptist	9	–
3	Tabor	6	–

=== Kingsport Bracket ===
Hosted by Kingsport CVB & Appalachian Athletic Conference at Hunter Wright Stadium

First round
4	Talladega (AL)	2
5	Marian (IN)	3
First round
4	Talladega	3
2	Tennessee Wesleyan	5

Second round
1	Keiser (FL)	4
5	Marian	1
2	Tennessee Wesleyan	2
3	IU–Southeast	6
Second round
5	Marian	7
2	Tennessee Wesleyan	8^{10}

Semifinals
1	Keiser	7
3	IU–Southeast	1
Semifinals
3	IU–Southeast	9
2	Tennessee Wesleyan	8

Finals
1	Keiser	6	9
3	IU–Southeast	9^{10}	6

=== Lawrenceville Bracket ===
Hosted by Georgia Gwinnett at Grizzly Baseball Field

First round
4	The Master's (CA)	8
5	LSU–Shreveport	4
First round
5	LSU–Shreveport	6
3	Central Methodist	4

Second round
1	Georgia Gwinnett	3
4	The Master's	4
2	Webber International (FL)	3
3	Central Methodist (MO)	0
Second round
1	Georgia Gwinnett	20
5	LSU–Shreveport	2

Semifinals
4	The Master's	14
2	Webber International	12
Semifinals
2	Webber International	6
1	Georgia Gwinnett	7

Finals
4	The Master's	9	–
1	Georgia Gwinnett	1	–

=== Lima Bracket ===
Hosted by Northwestern Ohio at St. Rita's Sports Complex

First round
4	MidAmerica Nazarene (KS)	8
5	Midway (KY)	3
First round
5	Midway	13
2	Middle Georgia State	14

Second round
1	Northwestern Ohio	7
4	MidAmerica Nazarene	2
2	Middle Georgia State	2
3	Hope International (CA)	4
Second round
4	MidAmerica Nazarene	1
2	Middle Georgia State	8

Semifinals
1	Northwestern Ohio	7
3	Hope International	17
Semifinals
1	Northwestern Ohio	6
2	Middle Georgia State	13

Finals
3	Hope International	12	–
2	Middle Georgia State	11	–

=== Montgomery Bracket ===
Hosted by Faulkner (AL) at Harrison Field

First round
4	Cumberlands (KY)	9
5	Truett McConnell (GA)	10^{11}
First round
4	Cumberlands (KY)	9
2	St. Thomas (FL)	7

Second round
1	Faulkner (AL)	6
5	Truett McConnell	1
2	St. Thomas (FL)	6
3	Huntington (IN)	12
Second round
5	Truett McConnell	3
4	Cumberlands (KY)	1

Semifinals
1	Faulkner	3
3	Huntington	0
Semifinals
3	Huntington	11
5	Truett McConnell	6

Finals
1	Faulkner	8	–
3	Huntington	4	–

=== Oklahoma City Bracket ===
Hosted by Oklahoma City at Jim Wade Stadium

First round
4	Friends (KS)	5
5	College of Idaho	1
First round
5	College of Idaho	4
2	Mayville State	2

Second round
1	Oklahoma City	10
4	Friends	5
2	Mayville State (ND)	2
3	Campbellsville (KY)	3
Second round
4	Friends	9
5	College of Idaho	6

Semifinals
1	Oklahoma City	19
3	Campbellsville	5
Semifinals
3	Campbellsville	8
4	Friends	6

Finals
1	Oklahoma City	17^{10}	–
3	Campbellsville	16	–

== NAIA World Series ==
The NAIA World Series was held at Harris Field in Lewiston, Idaho.

=== Participants ===
School	Conference	Record	Head Coach	Bracket	Previous NAIA WS Appearances	Best NAIA WS Finish	NAIA WS Record
Faulkner (AL)	Southern States	50–10	Patrick McCarthy	Montgomery	5 (last: 2016)	1st (2013)	13–8
Hope International (CA)	Golden State	35–16	Erich Pfohl	Lima	none	none	0–0
Keiser (FL)	The Sun	42–19	Jeremy Kennedy	Kingsport	none	none	0–0
Lewis–Clark State (ID)	NAIA West Group (Frontier)	35–13	Jeremiah Robbins	n/a	35 (last: 2016)	1st (1984, 1985, 1987, 1988, 1989, 1990, 1991, 1992, 1996, 1999, 2000, 2002, 2003, 2006, 2007, 2008, 2015, 2016)	137–45
Missouri Baptist	American Midwest	44–14	Eddie Uschold	Hutchinson	1 (last: 2013)	T-5th (2013)	2–2
Oklahoma City	Sooner	44–8	Denney Crabaugh	Oklahoma City	14 (last: 2012)	1st (2005)	33–27
Oklahoma Wesleyan	Kansas	51–10	Mike Parker	Bartlesville	1 (last: 2014)	3rd (2014)	3–2
Science & Arts (OK)	Sooner	44–15	Mike Ross	Bellevue	1 (last: 2016)	T-9th (2016)	0–2
The Master's (CA)	Golden State	39–21	Monte Brooks	Lawrenceville	3 (last: 2016)	T-3rd (2000)	4–6
William Carey (MS)	Southern States	42–18	Bobby Halford	Hattiesburg	2 (last: 1978)	1st (1969)	4–3

=== Bracket ===
==== Preliminary Bracket ====
First round Friday, May 26
8	Hope International	8
9	William Carey	11
7	Science & Arts	3
10	The Master's	7
First round Saturday, May 27; Losers eliminated
7	Science & Arts	8
3	Oklahoma Wesleyan	2
8	Hope International	5
4	Keiser	8

First round Friday, May 26; Second round Saturday, May 27
1	Oklahoma City	8
9	William Carey	3
4	Keiser	4
5	Lewis–Clark State	7
2	Faulkner	13
10	The Master's	5
3	Oklahoma Wesleyan	3
6	Missouri Baptist	5
Second round Monday, May 29; Losers eliminated
9	William Carey	6
7	Science & Arts	5
10	The Master's	9
4	Keiser	2

Third round Monday, May 29; Winners to Championship Bracket
1	Oklahoma City	7
5	Lewis–Clark State	8
2	Faulkner	16
6	Missouri Baptist	2
Third round Tuesday, May 30; Winners to Championship Bracket
6	Missouri Baptist	3
9	William Carey	12
1	Oklahoma City	16
10	The Master's	5

Fourth Round; Tuesday, May 30
5	Lewis–Clark State	8
2	Faulkner	6

==== Championship Bracket ====
Semifinals; Wednesday, May 31
5	Lewis–Clark State	12
9	William Carey	7
2	Faulkner	5
1	Oklahoma City	3

Finals; Thursday, June 1 Friday, June 2
5	Lewis–Clark State	5	6
2	Faulkner	6	4

=== Game Results ===
All game times are listed in Pacific Daylight Time (UTC−07:00).

==== Preliminary Bracket ====
Friday, May 26; 8:30 am Game 1	(7) Science & Arts	3–7	(10) The Master's	Harris Field; Attendance: 1530; Umpires: HP: Joey Stegner, 1B: Jason Werle, 2B: Dale Gardner, 3B: Juan Garza
Friday, May 26; 8:30 am Game 1	LP: Francis Ventura (10–2)	Boxscore	WP: Jason Karkenny (6–2); Sv: Danny Lutz (2)	Harris Field; Attendance: 1530; Umpires: HP: Joey Stegner, 1B: Jason Werle, 2B: Dale Gardner, 3B: Juan Garza

Friday, May 26; 11:30 am Game 2	(3) Oklahoma Wesleyan	3–5	(6) Missouri Baptist	Harris Field; Attendance: 1015; Umpires: HP: Dale Gardner, 1B: Juan Garza, 2B: Joey Stegner, 3B: Jason Werle
Friday, May 26; 11:30 am Game 2	LP: Zach Johnson (11–1)	Boxscore	WP: Michael Syrett (9–1); Sv: Nick Vichio (14)	Harris Field; Attendance: 1015; Umpires: HP: Dale Gardner, 1B: Juan Garza, 2B: Joey Stegner, 3B: Jason Werle

Friday, May 26; 3:00 pm Game 3	(9) William Carey	11–8	(8) Hope International	Harris Field; Attendance: 1190; Umpires: HP: Bill Fogarty, 1B: Grant Henderson, 2B: Mike Pierce, 3B: Shannon Bunger
Friday, May 26; 3:00 pm Game 3	WP: Lane Fazende (7–5)	Boxscore	LP: George Castillo (8–4)	Harris Field; Attendance: 1190; Umpires: HP: Bill Fogarty, 1B: Grant Henderson, 2B: Mike Pierce, 3B: Shannon Bunger
Friday, May 26; 3:00 pm Game 3	HR: James Land (20), Tyler Odom (9), Larson Barkurn (1)	Boxscore	HR: Cameron Baranek (14), Brandon Gonzalez (11)	Harris Field; Attendance: 1190; Umpires: HP: Bill Fogarty, 1B: Grant Henderson, 2B: Mike Pierce, 3B: Shannon Bunger

Friday, May 26; 7:00 pm Game 4	(4) Keiser	4–7	(5) Lewis–Clark State	Harris Field; Attendance: 3010; Umpires: HP: Mike Pierce, 1B: Shannon Bunger, 2B: Bill Fogarty, 3B: Grant Henderson
Friday, May 26; 7:00 pm Game 4	LP: Daniel Garmendia (10–3)	Boxscore	WP: Connor Brogdon (7–1)	Harris Field; Attendance: 3010; Umpires: HP: Mike Pierce, 1B: Shannon Bunger, 2B: Bill Fogarty, 3B: Grant Henderson
Friday, May 26; 7:00 pm Game 4	HR: Jack Curtis (6)	Boxscore	HR: Raymond Pedrina (6), Seaver Whalen (10), Tyler McDowell (2)	Harris Field; Attendance: 3010; Umpires: HP: Mike Pierce, 1B: Shannon Bunger, 2B: Bill Fogarty, 3B: Grant Henderson

Saturday, May 27; 8:30 am Game 5	(3) Oklahoma Wesleyan	2–8	(7) Science & Arts	Harris Field; Attendance: 535; Umpires: HP: Shannon Bunger, 1B: Joey Stegner, 2B: Juan Garza, 3B: Dale Gardner
Saturday, May 27; 8:30 am Game 5	LP: Carlos Aldana (7–6)	Boxscore	WP: Jose Hidalgo (10–1)	Harris Field; Attendance: 535; Umpires: HP: Shannon Bunger, 1B: Joey Stegner, 2B: Juan Garza, 3B: Dale Gardner
Saturday, May 27; 8:30 am Game 5	HR: Hunter Henry (8), Will Price (28)	Boxscore	HR: Dillon White (16)	Harris Field; Attendance: 535; Umpires: HP: Shannon Bunger, 1B: Joey Stegner, 2B: Juan Garza, 3B: Dale Gardner

Saturday, May 27; 11:30 am Game 6	(8) Hope International	5–8	(4) Keiser	Harris Field; Attendance: 440; Umpires: HP: Juan Garza, 1B: Dale Gardner, 2B: Shannon Bunger, 3B: Joey Stegner
Saturday, May 27; 11:30 am Game 6	LP: Dominic Potlongo (7–5)	Boxscore	WP: Keivan Berges (6–1); Sv: Jeremy Graf (5)	Harris Field; Attendance: 440; Umpires: HP: Juan Garza, 1B: Dale Gardner, 2B: Shannon Bunger, 3B: Joey Stegner
Saturday, May 27; 11:30 am Game 6	HR: Brandon Gonzalez (12), Jose Tejeda (4)	Boxscore	HR: Keivan Berges (13), Brad Myott (5)	Harris Field; Attendance: 440; Umpires: HP: Juan Garza, 1B: Dale Gardner, 2B: Shannon Bunger, 3B: Joey Stegner

Saturday, May 27; 3:00 pm Game 7	(10) The Master's	5–13	(2) Faulkner	Harris Field; Attendance: 520; Umpires: HP: Mike Pierce, 1B: Bill Fogerty, 2B: Jason Werle, 3B: Grant Henderson
Saturday, May 27; 3:00 pm Game 7	LP: Aaron Alexander (10–5)	Boxscore	WP: Ivan Pelaez (10–3)	Harris Field; Attendance: 520; Umpires: HP: Mike Pierce, 1B: Bill Fogerty, 2B: Jason Werle, 3B: Grant Henderson
Saturday, May 27; 3:00 pm Game 7	HR: David Sheaffer (9)	Boxscore	HR: Paolo Montezuma 2 (13)	Harris Field; Attendance: 520; Umpires: HP: Mike Pierce, 1B: Bill Fogerty, 2B: Jason Werle, 3B: Grant Henderson

Saturday, May 27; 6:30 pm Game 8	(1) Oklahoma City	8–3	(7) William Carey	Harris Field; Attendance: 2350; Umpires: HP: Jason Werle, 1B: Grant Henderson, 2B: Mike Pierce, 3B: Bill Fogerty
Saturday, May 27; 6:30 pm Game 8	WP: Matt Young (10–2)	Boxscore	LP: Conner McWilliams (7–2)	Harris Field; Attendance: 2350; Umpires: HP: Jason Werle, 1B: Grant Henderson, 2B: Mike Pierce, 3B: Bill Fogerty
Saturday, May 27; 6:30 pm Game 8		Boxscore	HR: Tyler Graves (6), Cody Christian (2)	Harris Field; Attendance: 2350; Umpires: HP: Jason Werle, 1B: Grant Henderson, 2B: Mike Pierce, 3B: Bill Fogerty

Monday, May 29; 8:30 am Game 9	(7) Science & Arts	5–6	(9) William Carey	Harris Field; Attendance: 405; Umpires: HP: Juan Garza, 1B: Joey Stegner, 2B: Bill Fogarty, 3B: Dale Gardner
Monday, May 29; 8:30 am Game 9	LP: Carlos Pimental (4–5)	Boxscore	WP: Braden Smith (7–3)	Harris Field; Attendance: 405; Umpires: HP: Juan Garza, 1B: Joey Stegner, 2B: Bill Fogarty, 3B: Dale Gardner
Monday, May 29; 8:30 am Game 9		Boxscore	HR: Tyler Graves (7)	Harris Field; Attendance: 405; Umpires: HP: Juan Garza, 1B: Joey Stegner, 2B: Bill Fogarty, 3B: Dale Gardner

Monday, May 29; 11:30 am Game 10	(8) Keiser	2–9	(10) The Master's	Harris Field; Attendance: 480; Umpires: HP: Bill Fogarty, 1B: Dale Gardner, 2B: Juan Garza, 3B: Joey Stegner
Monday, May 29; 11:30 am Game 10	LP: Kyle Keatts (7–5)	Boxscore	WP: Robert Winslow (9–5)	Harris Field; Attendance: 480; Umpires: HP: Bill Fogarty, 1B: Dale Gardner, 2B: Juan Garza, 3B: Joey Stegner
Monday, May 29; 11:30 am Game 10		Boxscore	HR: Jonah Jarrard (13), Michael Sexton (17)	Harris Field; Attendance: 480; Umpires: HP: Bill Fogarty, 1B: Dale Gardner, 2B: Juan Garza, 3B: Joey Stegner

Monday, May 29; 3:00 pm Game 11	(2) Faulkner	16–2	(6) Missouri Baptist	Harris Field; Attendance: 595; Umpires: HP: Grant Henderson, 1B: Mike Pierce, 2B: Shannon Bunger, 3B: Jason Werle
Monday, May 29; 3:00 pm Game 11	WP: Israel Fuentes (12–0); Sv: Preston Szuch (1)	Boxscore	LP: Patrick Boyle (7–3)	Harris Field; Attendance: 595; Umpires: HP: Grant Henderson, 1B: Mike Pierce, 2B: Shannon Bunger, 3B: Jason Werle
Monday, May 29; 3:00 pm Game 11	HR: Tra'mayne Holmes (7), Paolo Montezuma (14), Ryan Rosa (5)	Boxscore	HR: John Hagan (9)	Harris Field; Attendance: 595; Umpires: HP: Grant Henderson, 1B: Mike Pierce, 2B: Shannon Bunger, 3B: Jason Werle

Monday, May 29; 6:30 pm Game 12	(5) Lewis–Clark State	8–7	(1) Oklahoma City	Harris Field; Attendance: 4215; Umpires: HP: Shannon Bunger, 1B: Jason Werle, 2B: Grant Henderson, 3B: Mike Pierce
Monday, May 29; 6:30 pm Game 12	WP: Henry McAree (3–0)	Boxscore	LP: Mark Simon (10–2)	Harris Field; Attendance: 4215; Umpires: HP: Shannon Bunger, 1B: Jason Werle, 2B: Grant Henderson, 3B: Mike Pierce
Monday, May 29; 6:30 pm Game 12	HR: Seaver Whalen (11)	Boxscore		Harris Field; Attendance: 4215; Umpires: HP: Shannon Bunger, 1B: Jason Werle, 2B: Grant Henderson, 3B: Mike Pierce

Tuesday, May 30; 11:00 am Game 13	(6) Missouri Baptist	3–12	(9) William Carey	Harris Field; Attendance: 235; Umpires: HP: Joey Stegner, 1B: Grant Henderson, 2B: Shannon Bunger, 3B: Mike Pierce
Tuesday, May 30; 11:00 am Game 13	LP: Donnie Lovelady (7–5)	Boxscore	WP: Cole Edgens (10–1)	Harris Field; Attendance: 235; Umpires: HP: Joey Stegner, 1B: Grant Henderson, 2B: Shannon Bunger, 3B: Mike Pierce
Tuesday, May 30; 11:00 am Game 13	HR: Austin Rieman (5)	Boxscore	HR: Tyler Graves (8), Larson Barkurn (2)	Harris Field; Attendance: 235; Umpires: HP: Joey Stegner, 1B: Grant Henderson, 2B: Shannon Bunger, 3B: Mike Pierce

Tuesday, May 30; 3:00 pm Game 14	(10) The Master's	5–16	(1) Oklahoma City	Harris Field; Attendance: 390; Umpires: HP: Jason Werle, 1B: Juan Garza, 2B: Bill Fogarty, 3B: Dale Gardner
Tuesday, May 30; 3:00 pm Game 14	LP: Jason Karkenny (6–3)	Boxscore	WP: Roberto Delgado (10–2)	Harris Field; Attendance: 390; Umpires: HP: Jason Werle, 1B: Juan Garza, 2B: Bill Fogarty, 3B: Dale Gardner
Tuesday, May 30; 3:00 pm Game 14	HR: Pearson Good (1)	Boxscore	HR: Jared Baker (20), Garrett Foster (7), Branden Grieger (9), Jerame Littell (11)	Harris Field; Attendance: 390; Umpires: HP: Jason Werle, 1B: Juan Garza, 2B: Bill Fogarty, 3B: Dale Gardner

Tuesday, May 30; 6:30 pm Game 15	(2) Faulkner	6–8	(5) Lewis–Clark State	Harris Field; Attendance: 2450; Umpires: HP: Mike Pierce, 1B: Shannon Bunger, 2B: Joey Stegner, 3B: Grant Henderson
Tuesday, May 30; 6:30 pm Game 15	LP: Tyler Tungate (10–1)	Boxscore	WP: Matt Fish (7–1); Sv: Anthony Balderas (4)	Harris Field; Attendance: 2450; Umpires: HP: Mike Pierce, 1B: Shannon Bunger, 2B: Joey Stegner, 3B: Grant Henderson
Tuesday, May 30; 6:30 pm Game 15	HR: Ryan Rosa (6)	Boxscore	HR: Raymond Pedrina (7), J.J. Robinson (20)	Harris Field; Attendance: 2450; Umpires: HP: Mike Pierce, 1B: Shannon Bunger, 2B: Joey Stegner, 3B: Grant Henderson

==== Championship Bracket ====
Wednesday, May 31; 3:05 pm Game 16	(1) Oklahoma City	3–5	(2) Faulkner	Harris Field; Attendance: 676; Umpires: HP: Dale Gardner, 1B: Jason Werle, 2B: Shannon Bunger, 3B: Joey Stegner, LF: Grant Henderson, RF: Mike Pierce
Wednesday, May 31; 3:05 pm Game 16	LP: Matt Young (10–3)	Boxscore	WP: Ivan Belaez (11–3); Sv: Tra'mayne Holmes (2)	Harris Field; Attendance: 676; Umpires: HP: Dale Gardner, 1B: Jason Werle, 2B: Shannon Bunger, 3B: Joey Stegner, LF: Grant Henderson, RF: Mike Pierce
Wednesday, May 31; 3:05 pm Game 16		Boxscore	HR: John Price (9)	Harris Field; Attendance: 676; Umpires: HP: Dale Gardner, 1B: Jason Werle, 2B: Shannon Bunger, 3B: Joey Stegner, LF: Grant Henderson, RF: Mike Pierce

Wednesday, May 31; 6:35 pm Game 17	(9) William Carey	7–12	(5) Lewis–Clark State	Harris Field; Attendance: 2830
Wednesday, May 31; 6:35 pm Game 17	LP: Conner McWilliams (7–6)	Boxscore	WP: Connor Brodgdon (8–1)	Harris Field; Attendance: 2830
Wednesday, May 31; 6:35 pm Game 17	HR: Tyler Graves (9), James Land (21), Cody Christian (3)	Boxscore	HR: Micah Brown (5), Seaver Whalen (12), J.J. Robinson 2 (22), Logan Griffin (5)	Harris Field; Attendance: 2830

==== Championship Games ====
===== Game 1 =====
Thursday, June 1 6:35 pm PDT at Harris Field Game 18
Team	1	2	3	4	5	6	7	8	9	R	H	E
Lewis–Clark State	0	0	0	1	4	0	0	0	0	5	5	1
Faulkner	1	0	0	1	0	1	0	1	2	6	10	0
WP: Austin Moreland (3–0) LP: Henry McAree (3–1); Home runs: LCSC: None; FU: Tra'mayne Holmes (8), John Price (10); Attendance: 3780; Umpires: HP: Shannon Bunger, 1B: Mike Pierce, 2B: Grant Henderson, 3B: Dale Gardner, LF: Jason Werle, RF: Joey Stegner; Notes: Winning run scored with 1 out Boxscore

===== Game 2 =====
Friday, June 2 6:35 pm PDT at Harris Field Game 19
Team	1	2	3	4	5	6	7	8	9	R	H	E
Faulkner	2	1	0	1	0	0	0	0	0	4	10	0
Lewis–Clark State	3	0	0	0	0	1	2	0	X	6	8	0
WP: Dalton Blackwell (2–0) LP: Jonathan Wilkins (0–2) Sv: Anthony Balderas (5); Home runs: FU: John Price (11); LCSC: Micah Brown (6); Attendance: 4390; Umpires: HP: Jason Werle, 1B: Shannon Bunger, 2B: Grant Henderson, 3B: Mike Pierce, LF: Dale Gardner, RF: Joey Stegner; Boxscore

== See also ==
- 2017 NAIA softball tournament
- 2017 NCAA Division I baseball tournament
- 2017 NCAA Division II baseball tournament
- 2017 NCAA Division III baseball tournament
