= 2016 NAIA baseball tournament =

- Teams: 46
- Finals site: Harris Field; Lewiston, Idaho
- Champions: Lewis–Clark State (ID) (18th title)
- Winning coach: Jeremiah Robbins
- MVP: Jacob Zanon (Lewis–Clark State)

The 2016 NAIA baseball tournament was the 60th edition of the NAIA baseball championship. The 46-team tournament began on May 17 with Opening Round games across nine different sites and concluded with the 2016 NAIA World Series in Lewiston, Idaho that began on May 27 and ended on June 3. Lewis–Clark State (ID) defeated Faulkner (AL) 12–11 in the championship game for their second consecutive title and 18th title in program history.

The 46 participating teams were selected from all eligible NAIA teams with the World Series host receiving an automatic bid to the NAIA World Series. The remaining 45 teams participated in the Opening Round with 31 teams being awarded automatic bids as either champions and/or runners-up of their conferences, and 14 teams were selected at-large by the National Selection Committee. Teams were then placed into one of nine pre-determined Opening Round sites of five teams a piece, each of which is conducted via a double-elimination tournament. The winners of each of the Opening Round sites plus the World Series host team participated in the NAIA World Series.

== Tournament procedure ==
A total of 46 teams entered the tournament. As World Series host, Lewis–Clark State received an automatic bid into the NAIA World Series. 31 automatic bids were determined by either winning their conference's regular season championship, conference tournament, and/or conference tournament runner-up. The other 14 bids were at-large, with selections determined by the NAIA Baseball National Selection Committee.

== Opening round hosts ==
On April 22, the NAIA announced the nine opening round host sites, which were played from May 17–20.

Opening Round hosts

Venue(s)	Location(s)	Host(s)
AUM Baseball Complex	Montgomery, AL (Note: Since Montgomery hosted two Opening Round sites, the site at Auburn–Montgomery was referred to as the Montgomery Bracket while the site at Faulkner was referred to as the Faulkner Bracket.)	Auburn University at Montgomery
Farmers Insurance Athletic Complex	Grand Rapids, MI	Davenport University
Harrison Field	Montgomery, AL	Faulkner University
Grizzly Baseball Field	Lawrenceville, GA	Georgia Gwinnett College
Jack Brown Stadium	Jamestown, ND	University of Jamestown
Hunter Wright Stadium	Kingsport, TN	Kingsport CVB; Appalachian Athletic Conference
Hobart-Detter Field	Hutchinson, KS	Tabor College
Historic Grayson Stadium	Savannah, GA	University of South Carolina Beaufort
Russell Carr Field	Santa Barbara, CA	Westmont College

== Bids ==
=== Automatic ===
School	Conference	Record	Berth	Last NAIA Appearance
Auburn–Montgomery	Southern States	42–15	Tournament runner-up	2015 (Daytona Beach Bracket)
Avila (MO)	Heart	33–24	Regular season champion	2013 (Cleveland Bracket)
Bellevue (NE)	North Star	47–9	Regular season champion	2015 (Bellevue Bracket)
British Columbia	NAIA West Group	38–20	Regular season runner-up	2015 (Santa Clarita Bracket)
Campbellsville (KY)	Mid-South	36–15	Tournament champion	2015 (Montgomery Bracket)
Central Baptist (AR)	American Midwest	44–14	Tournament champion	First appearance
Central Methodist (MO)	Heart	43–15	Tournament champion	2013 (Hattiesburg Bracket)
Clarke (IA)	Unaffiliated Group	37–15	Tournament runner-up	First appearance
College of Idaho	NAIA West Group	38–20	Tournament runner-up	2012 NAIA World Series
Faulkner (AL)	Southern States	46–12	Tournament champion	2015 NAIA World Series
Georgia Gwinnett	Unaffiliated Group	55–4	Tournament champion	2015 (Lawrenceville Bracket)
Indiana Tech	Wolverine-Hoosier	39–18	Tournament runner-up	2013 (Montgomery Bracket)
Indiana Wesleyan	Crossroads	36–23–1	Tournament co-champion	First appearance
Keiser (FL) (Note: Keiser (FL) was known as Northwood (FL) when they made their last Opening Round appearance.)	The Sun	37–20	Tournament champion	2015 (Montgomery Bracket)
Lewis-Clark State (ID)	NAIA West Group	48–7	World Series host	2015 NAIA World Series
LSU–Shreveport	Red River	38–18	Tournament champion	2015 (Shawnee Bracket)
Madonna (MI)	Wolverine-Hoosier	41–15	Regular season champion	2015 (Bellevue Bracket)
Mayville State (ND)	North Star	31–28	Tournament runner-up	2015 (Bellevue Bracket)
Midland (NE)	Great Plains	41–18–1	Regular season champion	2014 (Marion Bracket)
Missouri Baptist	American Midwest	42–13	Tournament runner-up	2015 (Oklahoma City Bracket)
Morningside (IA)	Great Plains	43–14	Tournament champion	First appearance
Olivet Nazarene (IL)	Chicagoland	39–15	Regular season champion	First appearance
Point (GA)	Appalachian	30–28	Tournament runner-up	2014 (Montgomery Bracket)
Rio Grande (OH)	Kentucky	37–23	Tournament champion	2015 (Daytona Beach Bracket)
Saint Xavier (IL)	Chicagoland	30–24	Tournament champion	2009 (Group 3 Bracket)
Science & Arts (OK)	Sooner	45–11	Tournament champion	2013 (Oklahoma City Bracket)
Sterling (KS)	Kansas	47–13	Tournament champion	2015 (Shawnee Bracket)
Tabor (KS)	Kansas	42–16	Regular season champion	2015 NAIA World Series
Taylor (IN)	Crossroads	40–16–1	Regular season champion	2013 (Kingsport Bracket)
Tennessee Wesleyan	Appalachian	45–12	Regular season champion	2015 (Kingsport Bracket)
Texas A&M–Texarkana	Unaffiliated Group	31–18	Tournament third place	First appearance
The Master's (CA)	Golden State	38–17	Tournament champion	2015 (Santa Clarita Bracket)

=== At–Large ===
School	Conference	Record	Last NAIA Appearance
Davenport (MI)	Wolverine-Hoosier	41–15	2015 NAIA World Series
Freed–Hardeman (TN)	American Midwest	40–17	2015 (Kingsport Bracket)
IU–Southeast	Kentucky	42–13	2011 (Kingsport Bracket)
Jamestown (ND)	North Star	50–9	2014 (Hutchinson Bracket)
Lindsey Wilson (KY)	Mid-South	37–22	2015 NAIA World Series
Middle Georgia State	Southern States	39–16	First appearance
St. Thomas (FL)	The Sun	35–20	2015 NAIA World Series
Texas Wesleyan	Sooner	39–17	2013 (Montgomery Bracket)
USC–Beaufort	The Sun	43–12	2013 (Hattiesburg Bracket)
Vanguard (CA)	Golden State	37–15–1	2015 NAIA World Series
Wayland Baptist (TX)	Sooner	44–15	2009 (Group 1 Bracket)
Westmont (CA)	Golden State	41–11	2015 (Lawrenceville Bracket)
William Carey (MS)	Southern States	37–19	2013 (Hattiesburg Bracket)
York (NE)	Kansas	44–15	2015 (Oklahoma City Bracket)

== Opening Round ==
=== Faulkner Bracket ===
Hosted by Faulkner (AL) at Harrison Field

First round
4	Central Methodist (MO)	14
5	Texas A&M–Texarkana	7
First round
5	Texas A&M–Texarkana	8
3	Texas Wesleyan	4

Second round
1	Faulkner (AL)	7
4	Central Methodist	2
2	Vanguard (CA)	4
3	Texas Wesleyan	1
Second round
4	Central Methodist	3
5	Texas A&M–Texarkana	4

Semifinals
1	Faulkner	10
2	Vanguard	0
Semifinals
2	Vanguard	14
5	Texas A&M–Texarkana	7

Finals
1	Faulkner	4	5
2	Vanguard	5	3

=== Grand Rapids Bracket ===
Hosted by Davenport (MI) at Farmers Insurance Athletic Complex

First round
4	Clarke (IA)	3
5	Saint Xavier (IL)	1
First round
5	Saint Xavier (IL)	0
2	York	6

Second round
1	Bellevue (NE)	1
4	Clarke	0
2	York (NE)	2
3	Davenport (MI)	4
Second round
4	Clarke	4
2	York	6

Semifinals
1	Bellevue	4
3	Davenport	7
Semifinals
1	Bellevue	4
2	York	3

Finals
3	Davenport	5	2
1	Bellevue	6	7

=== Hutchinson Bracket ===
Hosted by Tabor (KS) at Hobart-Detter Field

First round
4	Morningside (IA)	6
5	Mayville State (ND)	0
First round
5	Mayville State	3
2	Tabor	4

Second round
1	Science & Arts (OK)	24
4	Morningside	1
2	Tabor (KS)	2
3	Wayland Baptist (TX)	4
Second round
4	Morningside	1
2	Tabor	3

Semifinals
1	Science & Arts	3
3	Wayland Baptist	0
Semifinals
3	Wayland Baptist	7
2	Tabor	12

Finals
1	Science & Arts	18	–
2	Tabor	2	–

=== Jamestown Bracket ===
Hosted by Jamestown (ND) at Jack Brown Stadium

First round
4	Midland (NE)	14
5	Avila (MO)	10
First round
5	Avila	8
3	Jamestown	12

Second round
1	Sterling (KS)	22
4	Midland	3
2	Missouri Baptist	7
3	Jamestown (ND)	4
Second round
4	Midland	9
3	Jamestown	11

Semifinals
1	Sterling	5
2	Missouri Baptist	4
Semifinals
2	Missouri Baptist	15
3	Jamestown	8

Finals
1	Sterling	2	14
2	Missouri Baptist	7	4

=== Kingsport Bracket ===
Hosted by Kingsport CVB & Appalachian Athletic Conference at Hunter Wright Stadium

First round
4	Indiana Tech	4
5	Rio Grande (OH)	5
First round
4	Indiana Tech	10
2	Middle Georgia State	5

Second round
1	Tennessee Wesleyan	15
5	Rio Grande	4
2	Middle Georgia State	1
3	St. Thomas (FL)	2
Second round
5	Rio Grande	4
4	Indiana Tech	3

Semifinals
1	Tennessee Wesleyan	2
3	St. Thomas (FL)	1
Semifinals
3	St. Thomas (FL)	9
5	Rio Grande	6

Finals
1	Tennessee Wesleyan	1	6
3	St. Thomas (FL)	4	1

=== Lawrenceville Bracket ===
Hosted by Georgia Gwinnett at Grizzly Baseball Field

First round
4	Olivet Nazarene (IL)	2
5	British Columbia	12
First round
4	Olivet Nazarene	1
3	Lindsey Wilson	2

Second round
1	Georgia Gwinnett	3
5	British Columbia	0
2	IU–Southeast	8
3	Lindsey Wilson (KY)	4
Second round
5	British Columbia	4
3	Lindsey Wilson	8

Semifinals
1	Georgia Gwinnett	8
2	IU–Southeast	2
Semifinals
2	IU–Southeast	3
3	Lindsey Wilson	15

Finals
1	Georgia Gwinnett	3	3
3	Lindsey Wilson	9	4

=== Montgomery Bracket ===
Hosted by Auburn–Montgomery at AUM Baseball Complex

First round
4	LSU–Shreveport	4
5	Indiana Wesleyan	6
First round
4	LSU–Shreveport	2
2	Keiser	9

Second round
1	Auburn–Montgomery	10
5	Indiana Wesleyan	3
2	Keiser (FL)	2
3	Central Baptist (AR)	10
Second round
5	Indiana Wesleyan	1
2	Keiser	3

Semifinals
1	Auburn–Montgomery	20
3	Central Baptist	5
Semifinals
3	Central Baptist	7
2	Keiser	20

Finals
1	Auburn–Montgomery	8^{11}	–
2	Keiser	7	–

=== Santa Barbara Bracket ===
Hosted by Westmont (CA) at Russell Carr Field

First round
4	William Carey (MS)	7
5	College of Idaho	6
First round
5	College of Idaho	11
2	Madonna	8

Second round
1	Westmont (CA)	14
4	William Carey	1
2	Madonna (MI)	1
3	The Master's (CA)	7
Second round
4	William Carey	7
5	College of Idaho	6

Semifinals
1	Westmont	0
3	The Master's	1
Semifinals
1	Westmont	3
4	William Carey	10

Finals
3	The Master's	5	–
4	William Carey	4	–

=== Savannah Bracket ===
Hosted by USC–Beaufort at Historic Grayson Stadium

First round
4	Taylor (IN)	1
5	Point (GA)	8
First round
4	Taylor	4
3	Freed–Hardeman	15

Second round
1	Campbellsville (KY)	2
5	Point	7
2	USC–Beaufort	2
3	Freed–Hardeman (TN)	0
Second round
1	Campbellsville	7
3	Freed–Hardeman	2

Semifinals
5	Point	6
2	USC–Beaufort	5
Semifinals
2	USC–Beaufort	1
1	Campbellsville	6

Finals
5	Point	0	2
1	Campbellsville	10	1

== NAIA World Series ==
The NAIA World Series was held at Harris Field in Lewiston, Idaho.

=== Participants ===
School	Conference	Record	Head Coach	Bracket	Previous NAIA WS Appearances	Best NAIA WS Finish	NAIA WS Record
Auburn–Montgomery	Southern States	45–15	Marty Lovrich	Montgomery	3 (last: 2006)	2nd (1990)	7–6
Bellevue (NE)	North Star	51–10	Duane Monlux	Grand Rapids	12 (last: 2008)	1st (1995)	20–22
Faulkner (AL)	Southern States	50–11	Patrick McCarthy	Faulkner	4 (last: 2015)	1st (2013)	9–6
Lewis–Clark State (ID)	NAIA West Group (Frontier)	48–7	Jeremiah Robbins	n/a	34 (last: 2015)	1st (1984, 1985, 1987, 1988, 1989, 1990, 1991, 1992, 1996, 1999, 2000, 2002, 2003, 2006, 2007, 2008, 2015)	133–44
Lindsey Wilson (KY)	Mid-South	42–23	Jonathan Burton	Lawrenceville	1 (last: 2015)	T-9th (2015)	0–2
Point (GA)	Appalachian	34–29	Jeremy Christian	Savannah	none	none	0–0
Science & Arts (OK)	Sooner	48–11	Mike Ross	Hutchinson	none	none	0–0
Sterling (KS)	Kansas	50–14	Adrian Dinkel	Jamestown	1 (last: 2013)	T-9th (2013)	0–2
Tennessee Wesleyan	Appalachian	48–13	Travis Watson	Kingsport	3 (last: 2012)	1st (2012)	5–5
The Master's (CA)	Golden State	41–17	Monte Brooks	Santa Barbara	2 (last: 2013)	T-3rd (2000)	3–4

=== Bracket ===
==== Preliminary Bracket ====
First round Friday, May 27
8	Lindsey Wilson	7
9	The Master's	1
7	Sterling	9
10	Point	3
First round Saturday, May 28; Losers eliminated
9	The Master's	6
5	Science & Arts	1
10	Point	9
6	Auburn–Montgomery	11^{14}

First round Friday, May 27; Second round Saturday, May 28
1	Faulkner	5
8	Lindsey Wilson	4
4	Lewis–Clark State	2
5	Science & Arts	1
2	Tennessee Wesleyan	14
7	Sterling	4
3	Bellevue	6^{10}
6	Auburn–Montgomery	5
Second round Monday, May 30; Losers eliminated
7	Sterling	9
9	The Master's	7
8	Lindsey Wilson	15
6	Auburn–Montgomery	12

Third round Monday, May 30; Winners to Championship Bracket
1	Faulkner	0
4	Lewis–Clark State	3
2	Tennessee Wesleyan	9
3	Bellevue	3
Third round Tuesday, May 31; Winners to Championship Bracket
1	Faulkner	13
7	Sterling	6
3	Bellevue	4
8	Lindsey Wilson	1

Fourth Round; Tuesday, May 31
4	Lewis–Clark State	11
2	Tennessee Wesleyan	7

==== Championship Bracket ====
First Round; Wednesday, June 1
4	Lewis–Clark State	5
3	Bellevue	8
1	Faulkner	4^{11}
2	Tennessee Wesleyan	3

Semifinal; Thursday, June 2
3	Bellevue	5
1	Faulkner	14

Final; Friday, June 3
1	Faulkner	11
4	Lewis–Clark State	12

=== Game Results ===
All game times are listed in Pacific Daylight Time (UTC−07:00).

==== Preliminary Bracket ====
Friday, May 27; 9:00 am Game 1	(7) Sterling	9–3	(10) Point	Harris Field; Attendance: 2520; Umpires: HP: Dale Gardner, 1B: Grant Henderson, 2B: Mike Pierce, 3B: Jason Werle
Friday, May 27; 9:00 am Game 1	WP: James McDonald (6–1)	Boxscore	LP: Payne Kosobucki (7–2)	Harris Field; Attendance: 2520; Umpires: HP: Dale Gardner, 1B: Grant Henderson, 2B: Mike Pierce, 3B: Jason Werle

Friday, May 27; 12:00 pm Game 2	(9) The Master's	1–7	(8) Lindsey Wilson	Harris Field; Attendance: 1380; Umpires: HP: Mike Pierce, 1B: Jason Werle, 2B: Dale Gardner, 3B: Grant Henderson
Friday, May 27; 12:00 pm Game 2	LP: Conner Menez (11–3)	Boxscore	WP: Scott Debald (11–3)	Harris Field; Attendance: 1380; Umpires: HP: Mike Pierce, 1B: Jason Werle, 2B: Dale Gardner, 3B: Grant Henderson
Friday, May 27; 12:00 pm Game 2	HR: Nick Covello (18)	Boxscore		Harris Field; Attendance: 1380; Umpires: HP: Mike Pierce, 1B: Jason Werle, 2B: Dale Gardner, 3B: Grant Henderson

Friday, May 27; 3:00 pm Game 3	(3) Bellevue	6–5 (F/10)	(6) Auburn–Montgomery	Harris Field; Attendance: 1770; Umpires: HP: Mike Thomas, 1B: Cory Spangler, 2B: Eric Johansen, 3B: Shannon Bunger
Friday, May 27; 3:00 pm Game 3	WP: Leland Tilley (10–1)	Boxscore	LP: Jed Carter (2–1)	Harris Field; Attendance: 1770; Umpires: HP: Mike Thomas, 1B: Cory Spangler, 2B: Eric Johansen, 3B: Shannon Bunger

Friday, May 27; 7:00 pm Game 4	(5) Science & Arts	1–2	(4) Lewis–Clark State	Harris Field; Attendance: 2715; Umpires: HP: Eric Johansen, 1B: Shannon Bunger, 2B: Mike Thomas, 3B: Cory Spangler
Friday, May 27; 7:00 pm Game 4	LP: Allan Sanchez (13–2)	Boxscore	WP: Kevin Hamann (9–1)	Harris Field; Attendance: 2715; Umpires: HP: Eric Johansen, 1B: Shannon Bunger, 2B: Mike Thomas, 3B: Cory Spangler

Saturday, May 28; 9:00 am Game 5	(6) Auburn–Montgomery	11–9 (F/14)	(10) Point	Harris Field; Attendance: 770; Umpires: HP: Grant Henderson, 1B: Eric Johansen, 2B: Cory Spangler, 3B: Mike Pierce
Saturday, May 28; 9:00 am Game 5	WP: Clark Gray (3–0)	Boxscore	LP: Luis Florentino (3–8)	Harris Field; Attendance: 770; Umpires: HP: Grant Henderson, 1B: Eric Johansen, 2B: Cory Spangler, 3B: Mike Pierce

Saturday, May 28; 12:00 pm Game 6	(9) The Master's	6–1	(5) Science & Arts	Harris Field; Attendance: 1180; Umpires: HP: Cory Spangler, 1B: Mike Pierce, 2B: Grant Henderson, 3B: Eric Johansen
Saturday, May 28; 12:00 pm Game 6	WP: Brad Lohse (10–3)	Boxscore	LP: Alsis Herrera (11–4)	Harris Field; Attendance: 1180; Umpires: HP: Cory Spangler, 1B: Mike Pierce, 2B: Grant Henderson, 3B: Eric Johansen

Saturday, May 28; 3:00 pm Game 7	(2) Tennessee Wesleyan	14–4	(7) Sterling	Harris Field; Attendance: 1300; Umpires: HP: Shannon Bunger, 1B: Mike Thomas, 2B: Jason Werle, 3B: Dale Gardner
Saturday, May 28; 3:00 pm Game 7	WP: Ryan Hartman (10–0)	Boxscore	LP: Kade Wagner (11–3)	Harris Field; Attendance: 1300; Umpires: HP: Shannon Bunger, 1B: Mike Thomas, 2B: Jason Werle, 3B: Dale Gardner
Saturday, May 28; 3:00 pm Game 7	HR: Wardy Polanco (17), Omar Gomez (6), Chevis Hoover (3), Alfred Cruz (9)	Boxscore		Harris Field; Attendance: 1300; Umpires: HP: Shannon Bunger, 1B: Mike Thomas, 2B: Jason Werle, 3B: Dale Gardner

Saturday, May 28; 6:30 pm Game 8	(8) Lindsey Wilson	4–5	(1) Faulkner	Harris Field; Attendance: 405; Umpires: HP: Jason Werle, 1B: Dale Gardner, 2B: Shannon Bunger, 3B: Mike Thomas
Saturday, May 28; 6:30 pm Game 8	LP: Daniel Ferrell (7–4)	Boxscore	WP: Ivan Palaez (6–2); Sv: Austin Moreland (8)	Harris Field; Attendance: 405; Umpires: HP: Jason Werle, 1B: Dale Gardner, 2B: Shannon Bunger, 3B: Mike Thomas

Monday, May 30; 9:00 am Game 9	(7) Sterling	9–7	(9) The Master's	Harris Field; Attendance: 905; Umpires: HP: Eric Johansen, 1B: Jason Werle, 2B: Cory Spangler, 3B: Shannon Bunger
Monday, May 30; 9:00 am Game 9	WP: Kade Wagner (12–3)	Boxscore	LP: Aaron Alexander (4–2)	Harris Field; Attendance: 905; Umpires: HP: Eric Johansen, 1B: Jason Werle, 2B: Cory Spangler, 3B: Shannon Bunger
Monday, May 30; 9:00 am Game 9	HR: Gerald Ceballos 2 (11)	Boxscore	HR: Brandon Van Horn (11), Michael Sexton (17)	Harris Field; Attendance: 905; Umpires: HP: Eric Johansen, 1B: Jason Werle, 2B: Cory Spangler, 3B: Shannon Bunger

Monday, May 30; 12:00 pm Game 10	(8) Lindsey Wilson	15–12	(6) Auburn–Montgomery	Harris Field; Attendance: 1375; Umpires: HP: Cory Spangler, 1B: Shannon Bunger, 2B: Eric Johansen, 3B: Jason Werle
Monday, May 30; 12:00 pm Game 10	WP: Daniel Ferrell (8–4); Sv: James Roll (1)	Boxscore	LP: Kade Suther (8–4)	Harris Field; Attendance: 1375; Umpires: HP: Cory Spangler, 1B: Shannon Bunger, 2B: Eric Johansen, 3B: Jason Werle
Monday, May 30; 12:00 pm Game 10	HR: Alec Salcedo (1)	Boxscore	HR: Dalton Kelley (4)	Harris Field; Attendance: 1375; Umpires: HP: Cory Spangler, 1B: Shannon Bunger, 2B: Eric Johansen, 3B: Jason Werle

Monday, May 30; 3:00 pm Game 11	(3) Bellevue	3–9	(2) Tennessee Wesleyan	Harris Field; Attendance: 3010; Umpires: HP: Mike Thomas, 1B: Mike Pierce, 2B: Grant Henderson, 3B: Dale Gardner
Monday, May 30; 3:00 pm Game 11	LP: Todd Nicks (7–2)	Boxscore	WP: Tyler Thornton (11–2)	Harris Field; Attendance: 3010; Umpires: HP: Mike Thomas, 1B: Mike Pierce, 2B: Grant Henderson, 3B: Dale Gardner
Monday, May 30; 3:00 pm Game 11		Boxscore	HR: Sully Rios Reyes (6)	Harris Field; Attendance: 3010; Umpires: HP: Mike Thomas, 1B: Mike Pierce, 2B: Grant Henderson, 3B: Dale Gardner

Monday, May 30; 6:30 pm Game 12	(1) Faulkner	0–3	(4) Lewis–Clark State	Harris Field; Attendance: 3330
Monday, May 30; 6:30 pm Game 12	LP: Ivan Pelaez (6–3)	Boxscore	WP: Jake Barnett (6–1)	Harris Field; Attendance: 3330
Monday, May 30; 6:30 pm Game 12		Boxscore	HR: Dylan Tashjian (3)	Harris Field; Attendance: 3330

Tuesday, May 31; 12:00 pm Game 13	(8) Lindsey Wilson	1–4	(3) Bellevue	Harris Field; Attendance: 430; Umpires: HP: Shannon Bunger, 1B: Cory Spangler, 2B: Mike Thomas, 3B: Grant Henderson
Tuesday, May 31; 12:00 pm Game 13	LP: Tyler Russell (7–3)	Boxscore	WP: Braulio Torres-Perez (12–3)	Harris Field; Attendance: 430; Umpires: HP: Shannon Bunger, 1B: Cory Spangler, 2B: Mike Thomas, 3B: Grant Henderson
Tuesday, May 31; 12:00 pm Game 13		Boxscore	HR: Joe Mancuso (9)	Harris Field; Attendance: 430; Umpires: HP: Shannon Bunger, 1B: Cory Spangler, 2B: Mike Thomas, 3B: Grant Henderson

Tuesday, May 31; 3:00 pm Game 14	(1) Faulkner	13–6	(7) Sterling	Harris Field; Attendance: 450; Umpires: HP: Mike Pierce, 1B: Eric Johansen, 2B: Dale Gardner, 3B: Cory Spangler
Tuesday, May 31; 3:00 pm Game 14	WP: Kurt Lipscomb (3–2); Sv: Miguel Castellanos (4)	Boxscore	LP: Oscar Sandoval (6–2)	Harris Field; Attendance: 450; Umpires: HP: Mike Pierce, 1B: Eric Johansen, 2B: Dale Gardner, 3B: Cory Spangler
Tuesday, May 31; 3:00 pm Game 14	HR: T.J. Condon (9), Nick Cain (18)	Boxscore		Harris Field; Attendance: 450; Umpires: HP: Mike Pierce, 1B: Eric Johansen, 2B: Dale Gardner, 3B: Cory Spangler

Tuesday, May 31; 6:30 pm Game 15	(4) Lewis–Clark State	11–7	(2) Tennessee Wesleyan	Harris Field; Attendance: 3610; Umpires: HP: Jason Werle, 1B: Mike Thomas, 2B: Grant Henderson, 3B: Eric Johansen
Tuesday, May 31; 6:30 pm Game 15	WP: Henry Mcaree (8–0)	Boxscore	LP: Diego Ibarra (10–3)	Harris Field; Attendance: 3610; Umpires: HP: Jason Werle, 1B: Mike Thomas, 2B: Grant Henderson, 3B: Eric Johansen
Tuesday, May 31; 6:30 pm Game 15	HR: Jacob Zanon (13), Gunnar Buhner (4)	Boxscore		Harris Field; Attendance: 3610; Umpires: HP: Jason Werle, 1B: Mike Thomas, 2B: Grant Henderson, 3B: Eric Johansen

==== Championship Bracket ====
Wednesday, June 1; 3:05 pm Game 16	(2) Tennessee Wesleyan	3–4 (F/11)	(1) Faulkner	Harris Field; Attendance: 410; Umpires: HP: Eric Johansen, 1B: Shannon Bunger, 2B: Grant Henderson, 3B: Jason Werle, LF: Mike Thomas, RF: Cory Spangler
Wednesday, June 1; 3:05 pm Game 16	LP: Ryan Hartman (10–1)	Boxscore	WP: Christian Torres (11–2)	Harris Field; Attendance: 410; Umpires: HP: Eric Johansen, 1B: Shannon Bunger, 2B: Grant Henderson, 3B: Jason Werle, LF: Mike Thomas, RF: Cory Spangler
Wednesday, June 1; 3:05 pm Game 16	HR: Wardy Polanco (18), Alfred Cruz (10)	Boxscore	HR: Dennis Morton (16)	Harris Field; Attendance: 410; Umpires: HP: Eric Johansen, 1B: Shannon Bunger, 2B: Grant Henderson, 3B: Jason Werle, LF: Mike Thomas, RF: Cory Spangler

Wednesday, June 1; 6:35 pm Game 17	(4) Lewis–Clark State	5–8	(3) Bellevue	Harris Field; Attendance: 3890; Umpires: HP: Mike Thomas, 1B: Grant Henderson, 2B; Jason Werle, 3B: Shannon Bunger, LF: Cory Spangler, RF: Eric Johansen
Wednesday, June 1; 6:35 pm Game 17	LP: Tyler Burch (0–1)	Boxscore	WP: Ben McKendall (12–2); Sv: Leland Tilley (9)	Harris Field; Attendance: 3890; Umpires: HP: Mike Thomas, 1B: Grant Henderson, 2B; Jason Werle, 3B: Shannon Bunger, LF: Cory Spangler, RF: Eric Johansen

Thursday, June 2; 6:35 pm Game 18	(1) Faulkner	14–5	(3) Bellevue	Harris Field; Attendance: 1625; Umpires: HP: Shannon Bunger, 1B: Jason Werle, 2B: Mike Thomas, 3B: Grant Henderson, LF: Eric Johansen, RF: Cory Spangler
Thursday, June 2; 6:35 pm Game 18	WP: Ivan Pelaez (7–3)	Boxscore	LP: Kameron Miner (2–1)	Harris Field; Attendance: 1625; Umpires: HP: Shannon Bunger, 1B: Jason Werle, 2B: Mike Thomas, 3B: Grant Henderson, LF: Eric Johansen, RF: Cory Spangler
Thursday, June 2; 6:35 pm Game 18	HR: T.J. Condon (10), Deivy Palmeiro (6)	Boxscore	HR: Connor Garrison (1)	Harris Field; Attendance: 1625; Umpires: HP: Shannon Bunger, 1B: Jason Werle, 2B: Mike Thomas, 3B: Grant Henderson, LF: Eric Johansen, RF: Cory Spangler

==== Championship Game ====
Friday, June 3 6:35 pm PDT at Harris Field Game 19
Team	1	2	3	4	5	6	7	8	9	R	H	E
Lewis–Clark State	0	2	0	1	3	4	2	0	0	12	12	0
Faulkner	0	2	0	1	4	0	1	0	3	11	17	1
WP: Quin Grogan (5–1) LP: Brandon Suttles (0–1); Home runs: LCSC: Jacob Zanon (14), J.J. Robinson (15), Micah Brown 2 (7), Tyler McDowell (5), Julian Ramon (3); FU: T.J Condon (11), Dennis Morton 3 (19), Nick Cain (19); Attendance: 5020; Umpires: HP: Cory Spangler, 1B: Mike Thomas, 2B: Grant Henderson, 3B: Eric Johansen, LF: Shannon Bunger, RF: Jason Werle; Boxscore

== See also ==
- 2016 NAIA softball tournament
- 2016 NCAA Division I baseball tournament
- 2016 NCAA Division II baseball tournament
- 2016 NCAA Division III baseball tournament
