= Jacob Garsez =

American baseball coach

Current position
- Title: Head coach
- Team: Saint Martin's
- Conference: GNAC
- Record: 0–0 (–)

Biographical details
- Education: College of Idaho

Playing career
- 2006–2007: Columbia Basin CC
- 2007–2009: College of Idaho
- Position: infielder

Coaching career (HC unless noted)
- 2011: Caldwell (HS)
- 2011–2015: Corban University (assistant)
- 2016–2019: Antelope Valley
- 2021–2024: Oregon Tech
- 2025: Sonoma State
- 2026–present: Saint Martin's

Head coaching record
- Overall: 292–185–2 (.612)

Accomplishments and honors

Championships
- CCC Champions (2023); 4× CPAC Champions (2016–2019); 2× CPAC Tournament Champions (2018–2019)

Awards
- CCC Coach of the Year (2023); 2× CPAC Coach of the Year (2016, 2018); ABCA NAIA West Region Coach of the Year (2018)

Jacob Garsez is an American baseball coach who is the current head coach of Saint Martin's Saints.

== Early life ==
Prior to his coaching career, Garsez played high school baseball at Caldwell High School in Caldwell, Idaho, where he was an all-conference and first team all-state selection as a senior. Garsez then played college baseball at College of Idaho. Over the 2007–2009 seasons, Garsez posted a .273 average over 89 games played.

== Coaching career ==
Garsez was the head coach at Caldwell High School in 2011. He began his collegiate coaching career at Corban University in 2011 as an assistant coach. In 2012, he was named the team's recruiting coordinator and hitting coach. In 2014, he was elevated to Associate Head Baseball Coach in 2014. He primarily worked with the Warriors' infields and served as third base coach.

=== Antelope Valley ===
On January 15, 2015 Garsez was announced the head coach at Antelope Valley. In 2018, Garsez led the Pioneers to the university's first-ever NAIA World Series appearance. The club finished the season ranked sixth nationally in the NAIA coaches poll. With the Pioneers, Garsez was named California Pacific Conference Coach of the Year in 2016 and 2018. He was also recognized by the ABCA, where he was named NAIA Regional Coach of the Year in 2018.

=== Oregon Tech ===
On August 10, 2020, was named head coach at Oregon Tech. In 2023, Garsez was named Cascade Collegiate Conference Coach of the Year. In 2024, the Owls broke the single-season wins record, finishing 34–18.

=== Sonoma State ===
On August 1, 2024, Garsez was named head coach at Sonoma State University. During the 2025 season, the Seawolves announced the elimination of its athletic department.

=== Saint Martin's ===
On July 8, 2025, Garsez was announced as the new head coach of the Saint Martin's Saints.

== Head coaching record ==
Record table
Season	Team	Overall	Conference	Standing	Postseason
Antelope Valley (CPAC) (2016–2019)
2016	Antelope Valley	38–14	14–4	1st	
2017	Antelope Valley	37–18	24–6	1st	NAIA Tournament Qualifiers
2018	Antelope Valley	46–14–1	27–3	1st	NAIA World Series
2019	Antelope Valley	35–19–1	25–5	1st	NAIA Tournament Qualifiers
Antelope Valley:		156–65–2 (.704)	90–18 (.833)		
Oregon Tech (CCC) (2021–2024)
2021	Oregon Tech	23–25	18–14	2nd	CCC Tournament
2022	Oregon Tech	30–25	9–15	6th	
2023	Oregon Tech	33–19	16–8	1st	CCC Tournament
2024	Oregon Tech	34–18	18–6	2nd	CCC Tournament
Oregon Tech:		120–87 (.580)	61–43 (.587)		
Sonoma State (CCAA) (2025)
2025	Sonoma State	15–33	12–27	10th	
Sonoma State:		15–33 (.313)	12–27 (.308)		
Saint Martin's (GNAC) (2026–present)
2026	Saint Martin's				
Saint Martin's:		– (–)	– (–)		
Total:		292–185–2 (.612)			
National champion Postseason invitational champion Conference regular season champion Conference regular season and conference tournament champion Division regular season champion Division regular season and conference tournament champion Conference tournament champion
