= 2015 NAIA baseball tournament =

- Teams: 46
- Finals site: Harris Field; Lewiston, Idaho
- Champions: Lewis–Clark State (ID) (17th title)
- Winning coach: Jeremiah Robbins
- MVP: Beau Kerns (Lewis–Clark State)

The 2015 NAIA baseball tournament was the 59th edition of the NAIA baseball championship. The 46-team tournament began on May 17 with Opening Round games across nine different sites and concluded with the 2015 NAIA World Series in Lewiston, Idaho that began on May 22 and ended on May 29. Lewis–Clark State (ID) defeated St. Thomas (FL) 10–7 in the championship game for their 17th title in program history.

The 46 participating teams were selected from all eligible NAIA teams with the World Series host receiving an automatic bid to the NAIA World Series. The remaining 45 teams participated in the Opening Round with 29 teams being awarded automatic bids as either champions and/or runners-up of their conferences, and 16 teams were selected at-large for the first time by the National Selection Committee, which was created as a pilot group for the 2015 season. Teams were then placed into one of nine pre-determined Opening Round sites of five teams a piece, each of which is conducted via a double-elimination tournament. The winners of each of the Opening Round sites plus the World Series host team participated in the NAIA World Series.

== Tournament procedure ==
A total of 46 teams entered the tournament. As World Series host, Lewis–Clark State received an automatic bid into the NAIA World Series. 29 automatic bids were determined by either winning their conference's regular season championship, conference tournament, and/or conference tournament runner-up. The other 16 bids were at-large, with selections determined by the NAIA Baseball National Selection Committee.

== Opening round hosts ==
On April 15, the NAIA announced the nine opening round host sites, which were played from May 17–20.

Opening Round hosts

Venue(s)	Location(s)	Host(s)
Don Roddy Field	Bellevue, NE	Bellevue University
Farmers Insurance Athletic Complex	Grand Rapids, MI	Davenport University
Sliwa Stadium	Daytona Beach, FL	Embry–Riddle Aeronautical University (FL)
Harrison Field	Montgomery, AL	Faulkner University
Grizzly Baseball Complex	Lawrenceville, GA	Georgia Gwinnett College
Hunter Wright Stadium	Kingsport, TN	Kingsport CVB
Bison Field at Ford Park	Shawnee, OK	Oklahoma Baptist University
Jim Wade Stadium	Oklahoma City, OK	Oklahoma City University
Reese Field at Lou Herwaldt Stadium	Santa Clarita, CA	The Master's College

== Bids ==
=== Automatic ===
School	Conference	Record	Berth	Last NAIA Appearance
Auburn–Montgomery	Southern States	40–16	Tournament champion	2012 (Daytona Beach Bracket)
Bellevue (NE)	Midlands	44–13	Tournament champion	2014 (Shawnee Bracket)
Briar Cliff (IA)	Great Plains	29–23–1	Regular season champion	First appearance
British Columbia	NAIA West Group	38–17	Tournament champion	2014 (Santa Clarita Bracket)
Bryan (TN)	Appalachian	42–16	Tournament runner-up	2014 (Kingsport Bracket)
Cal State San Marcos	A.I.I.	36–15	Tournament champion	2013 (Santa Clarita Bracket)
Concordia (CA)	Golden State	44–15	Tournament champion	2013 (Daytona Beach Bracket)
Dakota Wesleyan (SD)	Great Plains	24–24	Tournament champion	2009 (Group 8 Bracket)
Davenport (MI)	Wolverine-Hoosier	48–9	Tournament champion	2014 (Santa Clarita Bracket)
Embry–Riddle (FL)	The Sun	36–17	Tournament champion	2014 (Daytona Beach Bracket)
Faulkner (AL)	Southern States	45–13	Tournament runner-up	2014 NAIA World Series
Grand View (IA)	Midwest	20–20	Tournament champion	2013 (Cleveland Bracket)
Judson (IL)	Chicagoland	40–18	Tournament champion	2014 (Montgomery Bracket)
Lewis-Clark State (ID)	NAIA West Group	41–11	World Series host	2014 NAIA World Series
Lindsey Wilson (KY)	Mid-South	38–17	Tournament champion	2013 (Daytona Beach Bracket)
LSU–Shreveport	Red River	43–12	Tournament champion	2014 (Montgomery Bracket)
Lyon (AR)	American Midwest	33–11	Tournament runner-up	2013 (Claremore Bracket)
Mayville State (ND)	North Star	39–20	Tournament champion	2014 (Hutchinson Bracket)
MidAmerican Nazarene (KS)	Heart	33–21	Tournament runner-up	2014 (Montgomery Bracket)
Missouri Baptist	American Midwest	41–11	Tournament champion	2014 (Kingsport Bracket)
Mount Vernon Nazarene (OH)	Crossroads	37–10	Regular season champion	2014 (Marion Bracket)
Northwestern Ohio	Wolverine-Hoosier	42–13	Regular season champion	First appearance
Northwood (FL)	The Sun	39–12	Regular season champion	First appearance
Oklahoma City	Sooner	43–11	Tournament champion	2014 (Jackson Bracket)
Peru State (NE)	Heart	38–14	Regular season champion	2012 (Paducah Bracket)
Rio Grande (OH)	Kentucky	32–20	Tournament champion	2010 (Group 7 Bracket)
Spring Arbor (MI)	Crossroads	30–16	Tournament champion	2014 (Marion Bracket)
St. Francis (IL)	Chicagoland	27–26	Regular season champion	2014 (Lawrenceville Bracket)
Tabor (KS)	Kansas	49–9	Tournament champion	2014 NAIA World Series
Tennessee Wesleyan	Appalachian	43–10	Regular season champion	2014 (Daytona Beach Bracket)

=== At–Large ===
School	Conference	Record	Last NAIA Appearance
Campbellsville (KY)	Mid-South	28–11	2012 (Kingsport Bracket)
Freed–Hardeman (TN)	American Midwest	35–14	2012 (Cleveland Bracket)
Georgia Gwinnett	A.I.I.	47–12	2014 NAIA World Series
LSU–Alexandria	Red River	39–14	2014 (Daytona Beach Bracket)
Madonna (MI)	Wolverine-Hoosier	37–15	2013 (Cleveland Bracket)
Oklahoma Baptist	Sooner	49–6	2014 NAIA World Series
Oklahoma Wesleyan	Midlands	46–12	2014 NAIA World Series
Southeastern (FL)	The Sun	38–19	2014 (Lawrenceville Bracket)
St. Catharine (KY)	Mid-South	37–15	First appearance
St. Thomas (FL)	The Sun	41–15	2012 (Hardeeville Bracket)
Sterling (KS)	Kansas	46–13	2014 (Jackson Bracket)
The Master's (CA)	Golden State	42–12	2014 (Santa Clarita Bracket)
Vanguard (CA)	Golden State	34–20	2014 (Santa Clarita Bracket)
William Woods (MO)	American Midwest	38–12	2014 (Lawrenceville Bracket)
Westmont (CA)	Golden State	39–15	2014 (Lawrenceville Bracket)
York (NE)	Midlands	39–17	2013 NAIA World Series

== Opening Round ==
=== Bellevue Bracket ===
Hosted by Bellevue (NE) at Don Roddy Field

First round
4	Madonna (MI)	1
5	Mayville State (ND)	6
First round
4	Madonna	6
3	William Woods	8

Second round
1	Tabor (KS)	8
5	Mayville State	0
2	Bellevue (NE)	3
3	William Woods (MO)	2
Second round
5	Mayville State	6
3	William Woods	3

Semifinals
1	Tabor	1
2	Bellevue	3
Semifinals
1	Tabor	12
5	Mayville State	4

Finals
2	Bellevue	5	4
1	Tabor	11	9

=== Daytona Beach Bracket ===
Hosted by Embry–Riddle (FL) at Sliwa Stadium

First round
4	Southeastern (FL)	4
5	Rio Grande (OH)	10
First round
4	Southeastern (FL)	2
3	Bryan	4

Second round
1	Auburn–Montgomery	2
5	Rio Grande	3
2	Embry–Riddle (FL)	3
3	Bryan (TN)	0
Second round
1	Auburn–Montgomery	2
3	Bryan	6

Semifinals
5	Rio Grande	3
2	Embry–Riddle (FL)	9
Semifinals
5	Rio Grande	5
3	Bryan	4

Finals
2	Embry–Riddle (FL)	2	–
5	Rio Grande	1	–

=== Grand Rapids Bracket ===
Hosted by Davenport (MI) at Farmers Insurance Athletic Complex

First round
4	Peru State (NE)	7
5	Grand View (IA)	12
First round
4	Peru State	6
3	Mount Vernon Nazarene	2

Second round
1	Oklahoma Wesleyan	4
5	Grand View	1
2	Davenport (MI)	10
3	Mount Vernon Nazarene (OH)	5
Second round
5	Grand View	6^{10}
4	Peru State	4

Semifinals
1	Oklahoma Wesleyan	1
2	Davenport	3
Semifinals
1	Oklahoma Wesleyan	7
5	Grand View	3

Finals
2	Davenport	6	11
1	Oklahoma Wesleyan	8	4

=== Kingsport Bracket ===
Hosted by Kingsport CVB at Hunter Wright Stadium

First round
4	LSU–Alexandria	9
5	Judson (IL)	4
First round
5	Judson	1
3	Freed–Hardeman	4

Second round
1	Tennessee Wesleyan	3
4	LSU–Alexandria	2
2	Lindsey Wilson (KY)	5
3	Freed–Hardeman (TN)	4
Second round
4	LSU–Alexandria	2
3	Freed–Hardeman	10

Semifinals
1	Tennessee Wesleyan	1
2	Lindsey Wilson	10
Semifinals
1	Tennessee Wesleyan	4^{11}
3	Freed–Hardeman	3

Finals
2	Lindsey Wilson	4	–
1	Tennessee Wesleyan	1	–

=== Lawrenceville Bracket ===
Hosted by Georgia Gwinnett at Grizzly Baseball Complex

First round
4	St. Catharine (KY)	9
5	Spring Arbor (MI)	3
First round
5	Spring Arbor	10
2	Westmont	13

Second round
1	Georgia Gwinnett	11
4	St. Catharine	5
2	Westmont (CA)	0
3	St. Thomas (FL)	5
Second round
4	St. Catharine	2
2	Westmont	6

Semifinals
1	Georgia Gwinnett	2
3	St. Thomas (FL)	10
Semifinals
1	Georgia Gwinnett	12
2	Westmont	3

Finals
3	St. Thomas (FL)	3	8
1	Georgia Gwinnett	10	2

=== Montgomery Bracket ===
Hosted by Faulkner (AL) at Harrison Field

First round
4	Lyon (AR)	9
5	St. Francis (IL)	3
First round
5	St. Francis (IL)	9
2	Northwood (FL)	10^{10}

Second round
1	Faulkner (AL)	17
4	Lyon	2
2	Northwood (FL)	2
3	Campbellsville (KY)	6
Second round
4	Lyon	10^{11}
2	Northwood (FL)	7

Semifinals
1	Faulkner	3
3	Campbellsville	1
Semifinals
3	Campbellsville	10
4	Lyon	2

Finals
1	Faulkner	5	–
3	Campbellsville	3	–

=== Oklahoma City Bracket ===
Hosted by Oklahoma City at Jim Wade Stadium

First round
4	Missouri Baptist	6
5	Dakota Wesleyan (SD)	4
First round
5	Dakota Wesleyan	2
3	York	4

Second round
1	Oklahoma City	4
4	Missouri Baptist	5^{13}
2	Concordia (CA)	2
3	York (NE)	1
Second round
1	Oklahoma City	10
3	York	4

Semifinals
4	Missouri Baptist	1
2	Concordia (CA)	4
Semifinals
4	Missouri Baptist	7
1	Oklahoma City	8^{10}

Finals
2	Concordia (CA)	2	7^{10}
1	Oklahoma City	5	6

=== Santa Clarita Bracket ===
Hosted by The Master's (CA) at Reese Field

First round
4	Vanguard (CA)	6
5	Cal State San Marcos	4
First round
5	Cal State San Marcos	3
2	Northwestern Ohio	4^{12}

Second round
1	The Master's (CA)	7
4	Vanguard	8
2	Northwestern Ohio	2
3	British Columbia	4
Second round
1	The Master's	3
2	Northwestern Ohio	6

Semifinals
4	Vanguard	8
3	British Columbia	2
Semifinals
3	British Columbia	1
2	Northwestern Ohio	2

Finals
4	Vanguard	8	–
2	Northwestern Ohio	0	–

=== Shawnee Bracket ===
Hosted by Oklahoma Baptist at Bison Field at Ford Park

First round
4	Briar Cliff (IA)	2
5	MidAmerica Nazarene (KS)	10
First round
4	Briar Cliff	1
2	LSU–Shreveport	14

Second round
1	Oklahoma Baptist	7
5	MidAmerica Nazarene	4
2	LSU–Shreveport	0
3	Sterling (KS)	1
Second round
5	MidAmerica Nazarene	10
2	LSU–Shreveport	15

Semifinals
1	Oklahoma Baptist	5
3	Sterling	0
Semifinals
3	Sterling	9
2	LSU–Shreveport	12

Finals
1	Oklahoma Baptist	17	–
2	LSU–Shreveport	12	–

== NAIA World Series ==
The NAIA World Series was held at Harris Field in Lewiston, Idaho.

=== Participants ===
School	Conference	Record	Head Coach	Bracket	Previous NAIA WS Appearances	Best NAIA WS Finish	NAIA WS Record
Concordia (CA)	Golden State	47–16	Mike Grahovac	Oklahoma City	2 (last: 2011)	1st (2011)	6–3
Davenport (MI)	Wolverine-Hoosier	51–10	Kevin Tidey	Grand Rapids	none	none	0–0
Embry–Riddle (FL)	The Sun	39–17	Randy Stegall	Daytona Beach	12 (last: 2013)	2nd (2005)	19–24
Faulkner (AL)	Southern States	48–13	Patrick McCarthy	Montgomery	3 (last: 2014)	1st (2013)	6–4
Lewis–Clark State (ID)	NAIA West Group (Frontier)	41–11	Jeremiah Robbins	n/a	33 (last: 2014)	1st (1984, 1985, 1987, 1988, 1989, 1990, 1991, 1992, 1996, 1999, 2000, 2002, 2003, 2006, 2007, 2008)	128–43
Lindsey Wilson (KY)	Mid-South	41–17	Jonathan Burton	Kingsport	none	none	0–0
Oklahoma Baptist	Sooner	52–6	Bobby Cox	Shawnee	4 (last: 2014)	4th (1989, 2014)	3–8
St. Thomas (FL)	The Sun	44–16	Jorge Perez	Lawrenceville	4 (last: 2007)	3rd (1996)	3–8
Tabor (KS)	Kansas	53–10	Mark Standiford	Bellevue	1 (last: 2014)	T-5th (2014)	2–2
Vanguard (CA)	Golden State	38–20	Rob Pegg	Santa Clarita	1 (last: 1985)	4th (1985)	2–2

=== Bracket ===
==== Preliminary Bracket ====
First round Friday, May 22
8	Concordia (CA)	12
9	St. Thomas (FL)	2
7	Lindsey Wilson	1
10	Vanguard	3
First round Saturday, May 23; Losers eliminated
9	St. Thomas (FL)	8
5	Davenport	3
7	Lindsey Wilson	0
3	Tabor	3

First round Friday, May 22; Second round Saturday, May 23; Sunday, May 24
1	Oklahoma Baptist	1
8	Concordia (CA)	4
4	Lewis–Clark State	6
5	Davenport	2
2	Faulkner	4
10	Vanguard	1
3	Tabor	1
6	Embry–Riddle (FL)	9
Second round Monday, May 25; Losers eliminated
10	Vanguard	10
9	St. Thomas (FL)	14
1	Oklahoma Baptist	5
3	Tabor	1

Third round Monday, May 25; Winners to Championship Bracket
8	Concordia (CA)	4
4	Lewis–Clark State	7
2	Faulkner	7
6	Embry–Riddle (FL)	6
Third round (Note: Bracket was adjusted after Game 12 to match teams in the losers' bracket who have not faced each other.); Tuesday, May 26; Winners to Championship Bracket
8	Concordia (CA)	5
6	Embry–Riddle (FL)	6
9	St. Thomas (FL)	5
1	Oklahoma Baptist	4

Fourth Round; Tuesday, May 26
4	Lewis–Clark State	10
2	Faulkner	12

==== Championship Bracket ====
First Round; Wednesday, May 27
2	Faulkner	3
9	St. Thomas (FL)	6^{10}
4	Lewis–Clark State	2
6	Embry–Riddle (FL)	0

Semifinal; Thursday, May 28
2	Faulkner	8
4	Lewis–Clark State	10

Final; Friday, May 29
4	Lewis–Clark State	10
9	St. Thomas (FL)	7

=== Game Results ===
All game times are listed in Pacific Daylight Time (UTC−07:00).

==== Preliminary Bracket ====
Friday, May 22; 9:00 am Game 1	(10) Vanguard	3–1	(7) Lindsey Wilson	Harris Field; Attendance: 1440; Umpires: HP: Jason Werle, 1B: Tracy Roles, 2B: Grant Henderson, 3B: Cory Spangler
Friday, May 22; 9:00 am Game 1	WP: Sean Issac (10–5)	Boxscore	LP: Chris Erker (7–6)	Harris Field; Attendance: 1440; Umpires: HP: Jason Werle, 1B: Tracy Roles, 2B: Grant Henderson, 3B: Cory Spangler

Friday, May 22; 12:00 pm Game 2	(9) St. Thomas (FL)	2–12	(8) Concordia (CA)	Harris Field; Attendance: 610; Umpires: HP: Grant Henderson, 1B: Cory Spangler, 2B: Jason Werle, 3B: Tracy Roles
Friday, May 22; 12:00 pm Game 2	LP: Marcos Barrios (9–3)	Boxscore	WP: Isaiah Terrazas (7–2); Sv: Garrett Kraemer (1)	Harris Field; Attendance: 610; Umpires: HP: Grant Henderson, 1B: Cory Spangler, 2B: Jason Werle, 3B: Tracy Roles

Friday, May 22; 3:00 pm Game 3	(6) Embry–Riddle (FL)	9–1	(3) Tabor	Harris Field; Attendance: 1240; Umpires: HP: Shannon Bunger, 1B: Dwayne Finley, 2B: Mike Thomas, 3B: Eric Johansen
Friday, May 22; 3:00 pm Game 3	WP: Stetson Nelson (10–4)	Boxscore	LP: Dustin Hurlbutt (10–3)	Harris Field; Attendance: 1240; Umpires: HP: Shannon Bunger, 1B: Dwayne Finley, 2B: Mike Thomas, 3B: Eric Johansen
Friday, May 22; 3:00 pm Game 3	HR: Hunter Bruehl (1)	Boxscore		Harris Field; Attendance: 1240; Umpires: HP: Shannon Bunger, 1B: Dwayne Finley, 2B: Mike Thomas, 3B: Eric Johansen

Friday, May 22; 7:00 pm Game 4	(5) Davenport	2–6	(4) Lewis–Clark State	Harris Field; Attendance: 2620; Umpires: HP: Mike Thomas, 1B: Eric Johansen, 2B: Shannon Bunger, 3B: Dwayne Finley
Friday, May 22; 7:00 pm Game 4	LP: Brendan Bender (8–2)	Boxscore	WP: Beau Kerns (11–1)	Harris Field; Attendance: 2620; Umpires: HP: Mike Thomas, 1B: Eric Johansen, 2B: Shannon Bunger, 3B: Dwayne Finley
Friday, May 22; 7:00 pm Game 4	HR: Brandon Cable (3)	Boxscore	HR: Seth Brown (23)	Harris Field; Attendance: 2620; Umpires: HP: Mike Thomas, 1B: Eric Johansen, 2B: Shannon Bunger, 3B: Dwayne Finley

Saturday, May 23; 9:00 am Game 5	(7) Lindsey Wilson	0–2	(3) Tabor	Harris Field; Attendance: 450; Umpires: HP: Cory Spangler, 1B: Mike Thomas, 2B: Dwayne Finley, 3B: Shannon Bunger
Saturday, May 23; 9:00 am Game 5	LP: Scott Sebald (10–4)	Boxscore	WP: Russell Longworth (12–3)	Harris Field; Attendance: 450; Umpires: HP: Cory Spangler, 1B: Mike Thomas, 2B: Dwayne Finley, 3B: Shannon Bunger

Saturday, May 23; 12:00 pm Game 6	(9) St. Thomas (FL)	8–3	(5) Davenport	Harris Field; Attendance: 475; Umpires: HP: Dwayne Finley, 1B: Shannon Bunger, 2B: Cory Spangler, 3B: Mike Thomas
Saturday, May 23; 12:00 pm Game 6	WP: Alex Hernandez (4–1)	Boxscore	LP: Corey Murphy (9–5)	Harris Field; Attendance: 475; Umpires: HP: Dwayne Finley, 1B: Shannon Bunger, 2B: Cory Spangler, 3B: Mike Thomas
Saturday, May 23; 12:00 pm Game 6		Boxscore	HR: Zack Sardellitti (2)	Harris Field; Attendance: 475; Umpires: HP: Dwayne Finley, 1B: Shannon Bunger, 2B: Cory Spangler, 3B: Mike Thomas

Saturday, May 23; 3:00 pm Game 7	(2) Faulkner	4–1	(10) Vanguard	Harris Field; Attendance: 765; Umpires: HP: Tracy Roles, 1B: Jason Werle, 2B: Eric Johansen, 3B: Grant Henderson
Saturday, May 23; 3:00 pm Game 7	WP: Jack Charleston (10–1)	Boxscore	LP: Scott Torrey (6–2)	Harris Field; Attendance: 765; Umpires: HP: Tracy Roles, 1B: Jason Werle, 2B: Eric Johansen, 3B: Grant Henderson

Saturday, May 23 (Note: Game was suspended due to weather on Saturday with two out in the bottom of the 4th and was resumed at 1:00 pm the next day.); 6:30 pm Game 8	(8) Concordia (CA)	4–1	(1) Oklahoma Baptist	Harris Field; Attendance: 2115; Umpires: HP: Eric Johansen, 1B: Grant Henderson, 2B: Tracy Roles, 3B: Jason Werle
Saturday, May 23; 6:30 pm Game 8	WP: Dillon Moran (10–4)	Boxscore	LP: Jinny Parra (10–2)	Harris Field; Attendance: 2115; Umpires: HP: Eric Johansen, 1B: Grant Henderson, 2B: Tracy Roles, 3B: Jason Werle

Monday, May 25; 9:00 am Game 9	(10) Vanguard	10–14	(9) St. Thomas (FL)	Harris Field; Attendance: 630; Umpires: HP: Cory Spangler, 1B: Tracy Roles, 2B: Grant Henderson, 3B: Jason Werle
Monday, May 25; 9:00 am Game 9	LP: Sam Frakes (0–3)	Boxscore	WP: Chris Rodriguez (3–0)	Harris Field; Attendance: 630; Umpires: HP: Cory Spangler, 1B: Tracy Roles, 2B: Grant Henderson, 3B: Jason Werle
Monday, May 25; 9:00 am Game 9	HR: Brock Eissman (9)	Boxscore	HR: Cesar Ramirez (7), Paul Chacin (6), Jerry Downs 2 (9)	Harris Field; Attendance: 630; Umpires: HP: Cory Spangler, 1B: Tracy Roles, 2B: Grant Henderson, 3B: Jason Werle

Monday, May 25; 12:00 pm Game 10	(3) Tabor	1–5	(1) Oklahoma Baptist	Harris Field; Attendance: 910; Umpires: HP: Grant Henderson, 1B: Jason Werle, 2B: Cory Spangler, 3B: Tracy Roles
Monday, May 25; 12:00 pm Game 10	LP: Jean Acevedo (10–2)	Boxscore	WP: Nathan Thompson (6–1)	Harris Field; Attendance: 910; Umpires: HP: Grant Henderson, 1B: Jason Werle, 2B: Cory Spangler, 3B: Tracy Roles

Monday, May 25; 3:00 pm Game 11	(2) Faulkner	7–6	(6) Embry–Riddle (FL)	Harris Field; Attendance: 2870; Umpires: HP: Mike Thomas, 1B: Dwayne Finley, 2B: Shannon Bunger, 3B: Eric Johansen
Monday, May 25; 3:00 pm Game 11	WP: Christian Torres (7–1); Sv: Alejandro Castro (10)	Boxscore	LP: Zac Grotz (8–2)	Harris Field; Attendance: 2870; Umpires: HP: Mike Thomas, 1B: Dwayne Finley, 2B: Shannon Bunger, 3B: Eric Johansen
Monday, May 25; 3:00 pm Game 11	HR: Chris Madera (9)	Boxscore		Harris Field; Attendance: 2870; Umpires: HP: Mike Thomas, 1B: Dwayne Finley, 2B: Shannon Bunger, 3B: Eric Johansen

Monday, May 25; 6:30 pm Game 12	(4) Lewis–Clark State	7–4	(8) Concordia (CA)	Harris Field; Attendance: 3540; Umpires: HP: Shannon Bunger, 1B: Eric Johansen, 2B: Mike Thomas, 3B: Dwayne Finley
Monday, May 25; 6:30 pm Game 12	WP: Nick Sagendorf (5–1); Sv: Beau Kearns (1)	Boxscore	LP: Garrett Kraemer (2–1)	Harris Field; Attendance: 3540; Umpires: HP: Shannon Bunger, 1B: Eric Johansen, 2B: Mike Thomas, 3B: Dwayne Finley
Monday, May 25; 6:30 pm Game 12	HR: Max Whitt (16)	Boxscore		Harris Field; Attendance: 3540; Umpires: HP: Shannon Bunger, 1B: Eric Johansen, 2B: Mike Thomas, 3B: Dwayne Finley

Tuesday, May 26; 12:00 pm Game 13	(1) Oklahoma Baptist	4–5	(9) St. Thomas (FL)	Harris Field; Attendance: 470; Umpires: HP: Dwyane Finley, 1B: Mike Thomas, 2B: Cory Spangler, 3B: Tracy Roles
Tuesday, May 26; 12:00 pm Game 13	LP: Les Northcutt (3–1)	Boxscore	WP: Chris Rodriguez (4–0)	Harris Field; Attendance: 470; Umpires: HP: Dwyane Finley, 1B: Mike Thomas, 2B: Cory Spangler, 3B: Tracy Roles
Tuesday, May 26; 12:00 pm Game 13		Boxscore	HR: Michael Centeno (8)	Harris Field; Attendance: 470; Umpires: HP: Dwyane Finley, 1B: Mike Thomas, 2B: Cory Spangler, 3B: Tracy Roles

Tuesday, May 26; 3:00 pm Game 14	(8) Concordia (CA)	5–6	(6) Embry–Riddle (FL)	Harris Field; Attendance: 430; Umpires: HP: Eric Johansen, 1B: Shannon Bunger, 2B: Jason Werle, 3B: Grant Henderson
Tuesday, May 26; 3:00 pm Game 14	LP: Collin Orellana (6–3)	Boxscore	WP: Stetson Nelson (11–4); Sv: Corey Tufts (1)	Harris Field; Attendance: 430; Umpires: HP: Eric Johansen, 1B: Shannon Bunger, 2B: Jason Werle, 3B: Grant Henderson
Tuesday, May 26; 3:00 pm Game 14		Boxscore	HR: Enderson Velasquez (2), Hunter Bruehl (2)	Harris Field; Attendance: 430; Umpires: HP: Eric Johansen, 1B: Shannon Bunger, 2B: Jason Werle, 3B: Grant Henderson

Tuesday, May 26; 6:30 pm Game 15	(4) Lewis–Clark State	10–12	(2) Faulkner	Harris Field; Attendance: 2890; Umpires: HP: Tracy Roles, 1B: Cory Spangler, 2B: Shannon Bunger, 3B: Mike Thomas
Tuesday, May 26; 6:30 pm Game 15	LP: Bryce Jackson (1–1)	Boxscore	WP: Phillip Anderson (9–2); Sv: Alejandro Castro (11)	Harris Field; Attendance: 2890; Umpires: HP: Tracy Roles, 1B: Cory Spangler, 2B: Shannon Bunger, 3B: Mike Thomas
Tuesday, May 26; 6:30 pm Game 15	HR: Michael Sexton (8)	Boxscore	HR: Dario Polanco (6), Cody Sos (9)	Harris Field; Attendance: 2890; Umpires: HP: Tracy Roles, 1B: Cory Spangler, 2B: Shannon Bunger, 3B: Mike Thomas

==== Championship Bracket ====
Wednesday, May 27; 3:05 pm Game 16	(6) Embry–Riddle (FL)	0–2	(4) Lewis–Clark State	Harris Field; Attendance: 2370
Wednesday, May 27; 3:05 pm Game 16	LP: Tyler Cyr (7–5)	Boxscore	WP: Ty Jackson (8–1); Sv: Beau Kerns (2)	Harris Field; Attendance: 2370
Wednesday, May 27; 3:05 pm Game 16		Boxscore	HR: Ty Jackson (8)	Harris Field; Attendance: 2370

Wednesday, May 27; 6:35 pm Game 17	(9) St. Thomas (FL)	6–3 (F/10)	(2) Faulkner	Harris Field; Attendance: 1095; Umpires: HP: Shannon Bunger, 1B: Cory Spangler, 2B; Dwayne Finley, 3B: Eric Johansen, LF: Tracy Roles, RF: Mike Thomas
Wednesday, May 27; 6:35 pm Game 17	WP: Chris Rodriguez (4–0)	Boxscore	LP: Kurt Lipscomb (6–3)	Harris Field; Attendance: 1095; Umpires: HP: Shannon Bunger, 1B: Cory Spangler, 2B; Dwayne Finley, 3B: Eric Johansen, LF: Tracy Roles, RF: Mike Thomas

Thursday, May 28; 6:35 pm Game 18	(2) Faulkner	8–10	(4) Lewis–Clark State	Harris Field; Attendance: 4005; Umpires: HP: Dwayne Finley, 1B: Shannon Bunger, 2B: Mike Thomas, 3B: Cory Spangler, LF: Eric Johansen, RF: Tracy Roles
Thursday, May 28; 6:35 pm Game 18	LP: Patrick McGrady (0–1)	Boxscore	WP: Beau Kearns (12–1)	Harris Field; Attendance: 4005; Umpires: HP: Dwayne Finley, 1B: Shannon Bunger, 2B: Mike Thomas, 3B: Cory Spangler, LF: Eric Johansen, RF: Tracy Roles
Thursday, May 28; 6:35 pm Game 18	HR: Randy Joung (2), Cody Sos (10)	Boxscore	HR: Ty Jackson (9), Max Whitt (17)	Harris Field; Attendance: 4005; Umpires: HP: Dwayne Finley, 1B: Shannon Bunger, 2B: Mike Thomas, 3B: Cory Spangler, LF: Eric Johansen, RF: Tracy Roles

==== Championship Game ====
Friday, May 29 6:35 pm PDT at Harris Field Game 19
Team	1	2	3	4	5	6	7	8	9	R	H	E
Lewis–Clark State	0	0	1	0	0	2	1	6	0	10	9	1
St. Thomas (FL)	5	0	0	0	2	0	0	0	0	7	8	2
WP: Cameron Pongs (3–1) LP: Eric Santamaria (0–1); Home runs: LCSC: None; STU: Eric Santamaria (4); Attendance: 4975; Umpires: HP: Tracy Roles, 1B: Mike Thomas, 2B: Dwayne Finley, 3B: Shannon Bunger, LF: Cory Spangler, RF: Eric Johansen; Notes: 44 minute lightning delay in the bottom of the 6th Boxscore

== See also ==
- 2015 NAIA softball tournament
- 2015 NCAA Division I baseball tournament
- 2015 NCAA Division II baseball tournament
- 2015 NCAA Division III baseball tournament
