= Placer Valley =

Northern California region, US

The Placer Valley is a region spanning the western slope of Placer County in Northern California and refers to the valley of Placer County. Placer Valley is located in the greater Sacramento metropolitan area. The area is 71 square miles in total.

Cities in Placer Valley include, Lincoln, Rocklin, and Roseville. Communities in Placer Valley are, Loomis, Granite Bay, Newcastle and Sheridan.

== Etymology ==
Reference to Etymology on Placer County.

== Geography ==
Placer County is divided into three sections, High Country, Gold Country and the Valley. Valley is considered to be the western slope of the county reaching from Roseville to Loomis and is referred to as Placer Valley.

East of Placer Valley is Gold County which leads to the Sierra Nevada and Lake Tahoe.

Placer Valley is northeast of Sacramento County. Interstate 80 and Highway 65 are the major highways that pass through Placer Valley.

== Economy ==
Major employers in Placer Valley are, Kaiser Permanente, Sutter Health, Thunder Valley Casino and Resort, Adventist Heath, Costco Wholesale, Golf land Sunsplash, Oracle, Hewlett- Packard, and Sierra Community College District.

== Local Media ==
Gold County Media covers Placer Valley with the Lincoln Messenger, Placer Herald and Roseville Press Tribune.

== Tourism ==
Placer Tourism, Inc., doing business as Placer Valley Tourism (PVT), is a Business Improvement District (BID), formed in 2004 by the City of Roseville under provisions in the California Streets and Highways Code Section 36500-36504, which is known as the "Property and Business Improvement District Law of 1994". The organization is classified for tax purposes as a 501(c)6.

The geographic footprint of PVT consists of the three cities of Roseville, Rocklin, and Lincoln, California. PVT exists to market the three-city region as a tourism destination in order to generate incremental room nights in hotels in the cities. PVT is a non-profit organization that markets Placer Valley as a sports facility destination. Placer Valley's most popular sports facilities are the Roebbelen Center located @the Grounds, Roseville Aquatics Complex, Maidu Sports Complex, and Hardwood Palace.

=== Points of interest ===
- Roebbelen Center located @the Grounds in Roseville, officially opened in February 2020. Previously named the Placer Valley Event Center, the Roebbelen Center is a 160,000 sqft indoor event center ideal for basketball, volleyball and other indoor sporting events. The Roebbelen Center is equipped with 12 basketball courts that can be converted to 24 volleyball courts. Meeting spaces and a 10,000 sqft lobby make the Roebbelen Center flexible for any event and is the largest event space in Placer Valley.
- Maidu Regional Park in Roseville, is known for a wide variety of sports amenities. This includes soccer fields, baseball and softball fields. Recreational options include picnic areas, bike path and jungle gyms.
- Mahany Regional Park in Roseville, which sports amenities include baseball, cycling, football, lacrosse, ultimate frisbee, tennis and soccer
- Roseville Aquatics Complex in Roseville and is known for their Olympic-size competition pool.
- Rocklin Quarry Park in Rocklin, that is popular for their adventure park, amphitheater and playground.
- William Jessup University in Rocklin, and is a Christian liberal arts university.
- Sierra College in Rocklin, is a public community college.
- Westfield Galleria in Roseville is a 1.4 million-square-foot shopping mall, the largest in the Sacramento region.
- Foskett Regional Park in Lincoln, has four lighted softball field, Baseball fields and four lighted soccer fields that are also suited for football, lacrosse and rugby.
- Gladding McBean a ceramics company located in Lincoln, is one of the oldest companies in California.
- McBean Regional Park in Lincoln, Lincoln Potters Woodbat Baseball team in the summer. During the school year, William Jessup University’s baseball team calls McBean home.
- Thunder Valley Casino in Lincoln, and is owned by the United Auburn Indian Community, a Native American tribe consisting of mostly Miwuk and Maidu Indians indigenous to the Sacramento Valley region.
