= Point Skyhawks =

Athletic Teams representing Point University in West Point, Georgia

Coordinates: 32.8791°N 85.1869°W

- University: Point University
- Association: NAIA
- Conference: Southern States (primary); AAC (football)
- Athletic director: Jaunelle White
- Location: West Point, Georgia
- Varsity teams: 19
- Football stadium: Ram Stadium
- Basketball arena: West Point Park Gym
- Baseball stadium: West Point Park Baseball Field
- Softball stadium: West Point Park Softball Field
- Soccer stadium: River Bowl Stadium
- Mascot: Charger
- Nickname: Skyhawks
- Colors: Navy blue and gold
- Website: skyhawkathletics.com
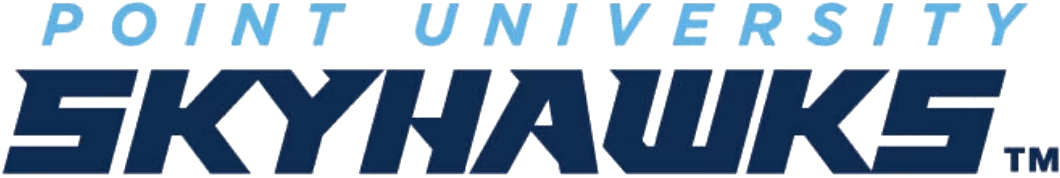

The Point Skyhawks are the athletic teams that represent Point University, located in West Point, Georgia, in intercollegiate sports in the National Association of Intercollegiate Athletics (NAIA). The Skyhawks primarily compete in the Southern States Athletic Conference (SSAC). They are affiliate members of the Appalachian Athletic Conference for football.

Its football team was a member of the Sun Conference for the 2014 and 2015 fall seasons, before moving to the Appalachian Division of the Mid-South Conference (MSC) where they competed from the 2017 to 2021 fall seasons. They were also a member of the National Christian College Athletic Association (NCCAA), primarily competing as an independent in the South Region of the Division II level.

On August 9, 2022, Point was invited and unanimously approved to join the Southern States Athletic Conference (SSAC), effective July 1, 2023.

== Conference affiliations ==
=== NAIA ===
- Appalachian Athletic Conference (2011–2023)
- Southern States Athletic Conference (2023–present)

== Varsity teams ==
Point competes in 19 intercollegiate varsity sports:

Men's sports	Women's sports
Baseball	Basketball
Basketball	Flag football
Football	Golf
Golf	Soccer
Lacrosse	Softball
Soccer	Volleyball

== Achievements ==
The Skyhawks football team won The Sun Conference championship in 2015.

In 1993, Point (then Atlanta Christian) won the NCCAA Division II-A men's basketball championship. In 2000, Point (then Atlanta Christian) won the NCCAA Division II men's basketball championship. In 2001 Carlton Griffin was the Pete Maravich Player of the Year.

The baseball team (as Atlanta Christian) won the 2000 NCCAA Division II and the 2010 NCCAA Division II-A national championships.
