= University of Northwestern Ohio =

University in Lima, Ohio, USA

- Former names: Northwestern School of Commerce (1920–1970); Northwestern Business College (1970–1974); Northwestern Business College-Technical Center (1974–1990); Northwestern College (1990–2000)
- Type: Private university
- Established: 1920; 106 years ago
- President: Jeffrey Alan Jarvis
- Academic staff: 135 (fall 2023)
- Students: 2,606 (fall 2023)
- Undergraduates: 2,572 (fall 2023)
- Postgraduates: 34 (fall 2023)
- Location: Lima, Ohio, United States
- Colors: Burgundy, Gray, Black & White
- Nickname: Racers
- Sporting affiliations: NAIA – WHAC
- Website: www.unoh.edu

The University of Northwestern Ohio (UNOH) is a private university in Lima, Ohio, United States. It was founded in 1920 and grants associate degrees, bachelor's degrees, and master's degrees across more than 50 disciplines within five constituent colleges. As of fall 2023, the university had an enrollment of approximately 2,600 students.

== History ==
The institution, initially established as the Northwestern School of Commerce in 1920, remained under this name until 1970 and was located on North Elizabeth Street in Lima, Ohio.

Since 1970, the institution has undergone various changes in name and location. In 1970, it was rebranded as the Northwestern Business College and was relocated two years later to the Cable Road campus in 1972. From 1974 to 1990, the institution was known as the Northwestern Business College-Technical Center, and later as the Northwestern College from 1990 to 2000. Since August 1, 2000, the institution has been officially designated as the University of Northwestern Ohio.

In January 2024, the UNOH Development Corporation purchased Harry's Hideaway in order to improve access to the UNOH Event Center, a 25,000-square foot building on North Cable Road.

== Academics ==
UNOH is structured into five colleges offering a variety of academic programs, including master's, bachelor's, and associate degrees, as well as diplomas and post-associate certificate programs:

1. College of Business
2. College of Occupational Professions
3. College of Health Professions
4. College of Applied Technologies
5. Graduate College

Some colleges collaborate with external institutions, such as the College of Applied Technologies, which offers a degree in Motorsports Marketing in partnership with Monster Jam University.

The university is accredited by the Higher Learning Commission and approved by the Ohio Department of Higher Education. Specific programs at the institution are accredited by the Commission on Accreditation of Allied Health Education Programs, National Automotive Technicians Education Foundation, or Partnership for Air Conditioning Heating Refrigeration Accreditation – Air-Conditioning Refrigeration Institute.

In 1994, the University of Northwestern Ohio was designated by the United States Department of Energy as one of six original Alternate Fuels training facilities in the United States. It is also a National Alternative Fuels Training Consortium Training Center.

== Student life ==
UNOH offers four dormitory communities for student accommodation: College Park, Northwestern Park, Sherwood Park, and Racers Village. These apartment-style dorms feature bedrooms, common living areas, some kitchens, and laundry facilities.

The UNOH Indoor Athletic Complex, situated on Cable Road across from the campus, is available for all students to use free of charge. Racers Station serves as a hub for student activities on campus, hosting events such as movie nights, pool tournaments, club meetings, and special occasions like Oktoberfest.

UNOH has two Honor Societies: the Kappa Beta Delta International Business Honor Society and the National Technical Honor Society.

In January 2024, UNOH received a Mental Health Support Grant from the Ohio Department of Higher Education, amounting to $168,551 over two years. The grant aims to improve mental health support services for students on campus, aligning with UNOH's commitment to student well-being.

== Athletics ==
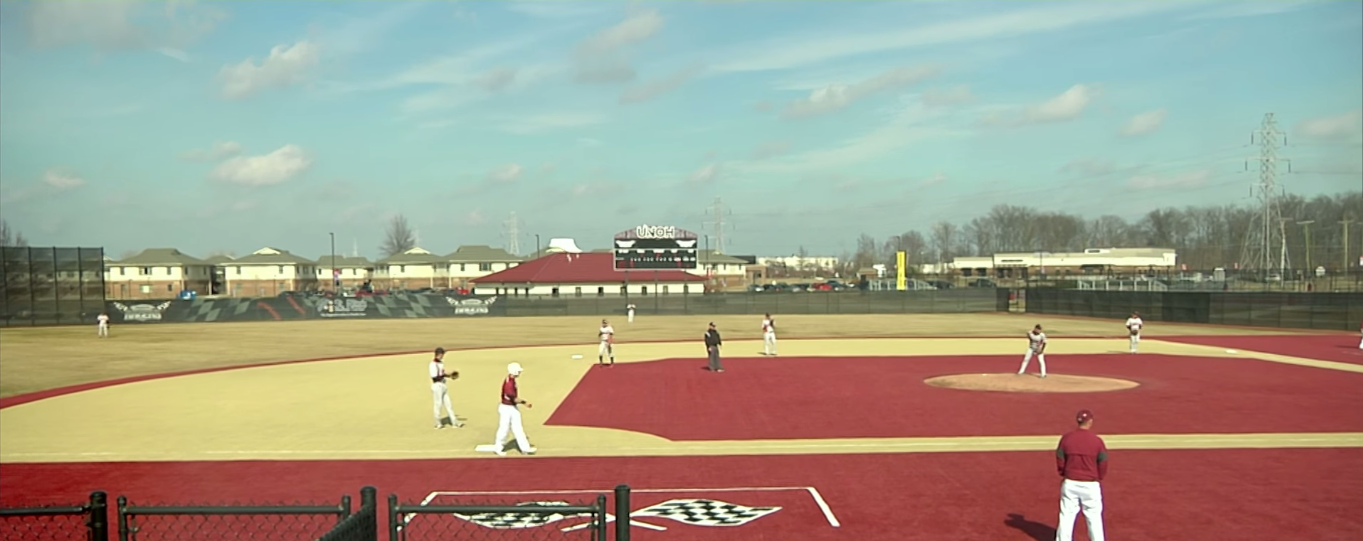
A 2015 college baseball game between Northwestern Ohio and Grace College at Racer Field

The UNOH athletic teams are known as the Racers. The university is a member of the National Association of Intercollegiate Athletics (NAIA), primarily competing in the Wolverine–Hoosier Athletic Conference (WHAC) since the 2010–2011 academic year. The Racers previously competed as a member of the defunct American Mideast Conference between 2008 and 2010, and as an NAIA Independent during the 2007–2008 school year when it debuted its athletics program and joined the NAIA. The school colors are burgundy and gray.

UNOH competes in 17 intercollegiate varsity sports. Sports for both men and women include basketball, bowling, golf, soccer, and tennis. However, men also have the opportunity to partake in baseball, while women have the option to play softball and volleyball. The school also has co-ed sports, such as cheerleading, and three motorsports teams that race stock, modified, or drag-style cars.
