= University of Antelope Valley =

For-profit university in Lancaster, California, U.S.

- Former names: Antelope Valley Medical College (1997–2009)
- Type: Private for-profit university
- Active: 1997–2024
- President: Tracy West
- Students: 1,146
- Undergraduates: 853
- Location: Lancaster, California, United States; 34.6835°N 118.1353°W
- Colors: Blue & Red
- Nickname: Pioneers
- Sporting affiliations: NAIA – Cal Pac
- Website: www.uav.edu

The University of Antelope Valley (UAV) was a private, for-profit university in Lancaster, California. It offered master's, bachelor's, and associate degrees as well as certificate programs and continuing education courses. The university was accredited by the WASC Senior College and University Commission, but it was placed on accreditation probation in 2023 for failing to meet several of the accreditor's standards following the university's 2022 purchase by Genius Group Limited, a Singaporean technology company.

On February 29, 2024, the California Bureau for Private Postsecondary Education ordered the university to cease all operations by March 8, 2024 due to its "severe financial position" at which point it closed permanently.

== History ==
The school was founded as Antelope Valley Medical College in 1997 by retired Los Angeles City firefighter / paramedic Marco Johnson and his wife Sandra as a school teaching community CPR, first aid, EMT and other medical training. In 2009 the school was accredited by the Accrediting Council for Independent Colleges and Schools and began granting associate's, bachelor's, and master's degrees and became the University of Antelope Valley. In 2016 the University of Antelope Valley received its regional accreditation from the Western Association of Schools and Colleges (WASC).

In 2022, the university was purchased by Genius Group Limited, a Singaporean technology group with plans to help the university grow. Those plans did not pan out and in 2023 the WASC Senior College and University Commission placed the university on probation for failing to meet several of it standards related to "leadership, financial strength, enrollment, student success and communication".

At about the same time, the university's president stepped down and an entirely new board of trustees took over management of the college. The institution began to pay employees primarily with stock options and faced eviction from several of its academic and residential buildings. The university eventually left its campus facilities on February 25, 2024 and switched to an online-only learning model. It also announced the immediate cancellation of its athletic programs, leaving its basketball teams trying to raise funds to attend national tournaments.

On February 29, 2024, the California Bureau for Private Postsecondary Education ordered the university to cease all operations by Friday, March 8, 2024 due to its "severe financial position" at which point the university closed.

== Academics ==
UAV offered five associate degrees, eight bachelor's degree programs, and three master's degree programs. A variety of certificate programs were also available. UAV was accredited by the Western Association of Schools and Colleges (WSCUC) and Commission on Accreditation of Allied Health Education Programs (CAAHEP). It was also approved by California's Bureau for Private Postsecondary Education (BPPE). At the time of its closure, UAV's Paramedic Program was only 1 of 4 programs approved in Los Angeles County.

== Athletics ==
The Antelope Valley athletic teams were called the Pioneers. The university was a member of the National Association of Intercollegiate Athletics (NAIA), primarily competing in the California Pacific Conference (Cal Pac) from the 2015–16 academic year until its closure during the 2023–24 season. The Pioneers previously competed as an NAIA Independent within the Association of Independent Institutions from 2004–05 when the school began intercollegiate athletics.

Antelope Valley competed in 11 intercollegiate varsity sports: Men's sports include baseball, basketball, cross country, distance track and soccer; while women's sports include basketball, cross country, distance track, soccer, softball and volleyball.

Although all athletic programs were suspended after the university was forced to shut down, the Pioneers men's and women's basketball teams were permitted to participate in the 2024 NAIA basketball championship tournaments after the team raised $40,000 on GoFundMe to continue operations until the tournament ended.
