= Faulkner Eagles =

Collegiate athletic program

- University: Faulkner University
- Nickname: Eagles
- Association: NAIA
- Conference: SSAC (primary); Mid-South (football)
- Athletic director: Reed Sutton
- Location: Montgomery, Alabama
- Varsity teams: 14 (6 men's, 6 women's, 2 co-ed)
- Football stadium: Billy D. Hilyer Stadium
- Basketball arena: Tine W. Davis Gymnasium
- Baseball stadium: Harrison Field
- Softball stadium: Wynn Field
- Colors: Royal blue and gray
- Website: faulknereagles.com
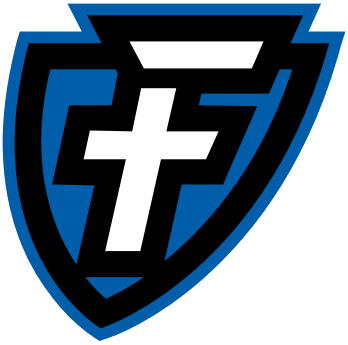

The Faulkner Eagles are the athletic teams that represent Faulkner University, located in Montgomery, Alabama as a member of the National Association of Intercollegiate Athletics (NAIA). The school is primarily a member of the Southern States Athletic Conference (SSAC), but also the Mid-South Conference as a football affiliate. They also formerly competed as members of the National Christian College Athletic Association (NCCAA).

== Varsity teams ==
Faulkner competes in 14 intercollegiate varsity sports.

| Men's sports | Women's sports |
|---|---|
| Baseball | Basketball |
| Basketball | Cross Country |
| Cross Country | Golf |
| Football | Soccer |
| Golf | Softball |
| Soccer | Volleyball |
Co-ed sports
Bass fishing
Esports
Cheerleading

== Conference affiliations ==
- Southern States Athletic Conference (1999–present)
  - Mid-South Conference – football only (2008–present)

== Facilities ==
| Venue | Sport(s) | Ref. |
|---|---|---|
| Billy D. Hilyer Stadium | Football; Soccer | |
| Tine W. Davis Gymnasium | Basketball; Volleyball | |
| Harrison Field | Baseball | |
| Wynn Field | Softball | |

== Conference championships ==
=== Mid-South (football only) ===
- 2013 West Division co-Champions

=== Southern States Collegiate Conference ===
| Sport | Titles (total) | Winning years | |
| Sport | Titles (total) | Regular season | Tournament |
|---|---|---|---|
| Baseball | 12 | 2004, 2012, 2013, 2014, 2016, 2018, 2019 | 2000, 2013, 2016, 2017, 2019 |
| Basketball (men') | 10 | 2000–01, 2001–02; 2002–03; 2019–20; 2020–21* | 2002, 2003, 2013, 2016, 2021 |
| Basketball (women') | 2 | 2012–13 | 2023 |
| Golf (men's) | 2 | | 2013–14, 2021–22 |
| Volleyball | 6 | 1999, 2001, 2018 | 2001, 2003, 2018 |

== National championships ==
=== NAIA ===
Faulkner has won two NAIA National Championship.

| Sport | Competition | Titles | Winning years |
|---|---|---|---|
| Baseball | World Series | 1 | 2013 |
| Basketball | Division I tournament | 1 | 2001 |

=== NCCAA ===
Faulkner has won two NCCAA National Championships.

| Sport | Competition | Titles | Winning years | Ref. |
|---|---|---|---|---|
| Baseball | National championship | 2 | 1985, 2001 | |
