= St. Thomas Bobcats =

Coordinates: 25.9199°N 80.2559°W

- University: St. Thomas University
- Association: NAIA
- Conference: The Sun (primary); AAC (men's wrestling); Mid-South (eSports)
- Athletic director: Bill Rychel
- Location: Miami Gardens, Florida
- Varsity teams: 29 (14 men's, 14 women's, 1 co-ed)
- Football stadium: AutoNation Field
- Basketball arena: Fernandez Family Center
- Baseball stadium: Paul Demie Mainieri Field
- Softball stadium: Col. Jaquelin J. Kelly Field
- Soccer stadium: AutoNation Field
- Aquatics center: MDC North Aquatic & Fitness Center
- Lacrosse stadium: AutoNation Field
- Tennis venue: STU Tennis Courts
- Mascot: Bobcat
- Nickname: Bobcats
- Colors: Burgundy and Navy
- Website: stubobcats.com

The St. Thomas Bobcats are the athletic teams that represent St. Thomas University, located in Miami Gardens, Florida, in intercollegiate sports as a member of the National Association of Intercollegiate Athletics (NAIA), primarily competing in the Sun Conference (formerly known as the Florida Sun Conference (FSC) until after spring 2008) since the 1990–91 academic year; while its men's wrestling team competes in the Appalachian Athletic Conference (AAC) and its eSports team competes in the Mid-South Conference (MSC). The Bobcats previously competed in the Sunshine State Conference (SSC) of the NCAA Division II ranks from 1975–76 to 1986–87.

== History ==
St. Thomas has won the NAIA men's basketball championship three times: in 1994, 1997, and 2009. St. Thomas Men’s Swimming won the first ever national championship in school history in 2024.

St. Thomas University added men's and women's track & field as a varsity sport in 2018 as well as a football team and marching band in 2019. The Bobcats football team competes in the Sun Division of the Mid-South Conference, and play their home games at AutoNation Field on their campus.

== Varsity teams ==
St. Thomas competes in 29 intercollegiate varsity sports:

Men's sports	Women's sports
Baseball	Basketball
Basketball	Beach volleyball
Bowling	Bowling
Cross country	Cross country
Football	Flag football
Golf	Golf
Lacrosse	Lacrosse
Rugby	Rugby
Soccer	Soccer
Swimming	Softball
Tennis	Swimming
Track and field	Tennis
Volleyball	Track and field
Wrestling	Volleyball
Co-ed sports
eSports
