= 2026 NAIA softball tournament =

College softball tournament

- Teams: 48
- Finals site: South Commons Complex; Columbus, Georgia
- Champions: Madonna (MI) (1st title)
- Winning coach: Ron Pezzoni
- MVP: Ashley Rosiewicz (Madonna)

The 2026 NAIA softball tournament was the 45th edition of the NAIA softball championship. The 48-team tournament began on May 11 with Opening Round games across ten different sites and concluded with the 2026 NAIA Softball World Series in Columbus, Georgia that started on May 21 and ended on May 28.

Madonna (MI) captured their first NAIA softball championship defeating Southeastern (FL) in the championship game 8–4 with Ashley Rosiewicz of Madonna winning the tournament MVP. Madonna went unbeaten in seven tournament games and finished the season with a 52–4 record.

The 48 participating teams were selected from all eligible NAIA teams. 29 teams were awarded automatic bids as either champions and/or runners-up of their conferences, four teams were selected at-large as Opening Round hosts, and 15 teams were selected at-large by the National Selection Committee. Teams were then placed into one of ten pre-determined Opening Round sites, with eight sites consisting of five teams and two sites consisting of four teams, each of which is conducted via a double-elimination tournament. The winners of each of the Opening Round sites will advance to the NAIA Softball World Series.

== Tournament procedure ==
A total of 48 teams entered the tournament. 29 automatic bids were determined by either winning their conference's regular season championship, conference tournament, and/or conference tournament runner-up. The other 19 bids were at-large, either by hosting an Opening Round or selected by the NAIA Softball National Selection Committee.

== Opening round hosts ==
On May 1, the NAIA announced the ten opening round host sites, which were played from May 11–15.

Opening Round hosts

Venue	Location	Host
Cox Softball Complex	Fayette, MO	Central Methodist University
UC Softball Complex	Williamsburg, KY	University of the Cumberlands
Marilyn D. Sparks Park	Columbia, KY	Lindsey Wilson University
UM Softball Field	Mobile, AL	University of Mobile
Ann Lacy Stadium	Oklahoma City, OK	Oklahoma City University
Stilwell Stadium	Klamath Falls, OR	Oregon Tech
Bill Smith Ballpark	Chickasha, OK	University of Science and Arts of Oklahoma
Diamond Plex	Winter Haven, FL (Note: Listed as Lakeland Bracket)	Southeastern University
Laurel Park	Ashland, OR	Southern Oregon University
Joseph & Nancy Fail Field	Hattiesburg, MS	William Carey University

== Bids ==
=== Automatic ===
School	Conference	Record	Berth	Last NAIA Appearance
Central Methodist (MO)	Heart	38–15	Tournament champion	2025 NAIA Softball World Series
Columbia (MO)	American Midwest	27–13	Tournament champion	2023 (Indianapolis Bracket)
Dickinson State (ND)	Frontier	40–12	Tournament champion	2024 (Fayette Bracket)
Dillard (LA)	HBCU	27–14	Tournament champion	First appearance
Evangel (MO)	Kansas	43–9	Regular season champion	2025 (Lawrenceville Bracket)
Friends (KS)	Kansas	31–20	Tournament runner-up	2025 (Sioux Center Bracket)
Georgia Gwinnett	Continental	29–22	Tournament champion	2025 NAIA Softball World Series
Indiana Tech	Wolverine-Hoosier	33–16	Tournament runner-up	2023 (Lawrenceville Bracket)
Indiana Wesleyan	Crossroads	37–13	Regular season champion	2025 (Marion Bracket)
IU Southeast	River States	29–21	Tournament champion	2024 (Hattiesburg Bracket)
Johnson (TN)	Appalachian	31–18	Regular season champion	2025 (Lawrenceville Bracket)
Keiser (FL)	The Sun	44–8	Tournament champion	2025 (Ashland Bracket)
Lindsey Wilson (KY)	Mid-South	41–6	Tournament champion	2022 (Marion Bracket)
LSU–Alexandria	Red River	34–16	Regular season champion	2025 (Fayette Bracket)
Madonna (MI)	Wolverine-Hoosier	45–4	Regular season champion	2025 (Marion Bracket)
Midland (NE)	Great Plains	42–14	Regular season champion	2025 NAIA Softball World Series
Missouri Baptist	Heart	40–12	Regular season champion	2025 (Oklahoma City Bracket)
Morningside (IA)	Great Plains	30–18	Tournament runner-up	2025 (Oklahoma City Bracket)
Oakland City (IN)	River States	36–16	Regular season champion	First appearance
Oklahoma City (OK)	Sooner	47–7	Tournament champion	2025 NAIA Softball World Series
Ottawa (AZ) (OUAZ)	Great Southwest	33–16	Tournament champion	2021 (Fayette Bracket)
Our Lady of the Lake (TX)	Red River	39–10	Tournament champion	2025 (San Antonio Bracket)
Saint Francis (IN)	Crossroads	41–12	Tournament champion	First appearance
Saint Xavier (IL)	Chicagoland	47–9	Tournament champion	2025 (Ashland Bracket)
Science & Arts (OK)	Sooner	44–7	Regular season champion	2025 (Chickasha Bracket)
Southern Oregon	Cascade	36–11	Tournament champion	2025 NAIA Softball World Series
Truett McConnell (GA)	Appalachian	30–17	Tournament champion	2021 (Hattiesburg Bracket)
William Carey (MS)	Southern States	39–12	Tournament champion	2025 (Oklahoma City Bracket)
Williams Baptist (AR)	American Midwest	41–13	Regular season champion	2016 (LSU–Alexandria Bracket)

=== At–Large ===
School	Conference	Record	Last NAIA Appearance
Arizona Christian	Great Southwest	36–13	2025 (Klamath Falls Bracket)
Benedictine (KS)	Heart	33–18	2024 (Williamsburg Bracket)
Blue Mountain Christian (MS)	Southern States	38–15	First appearance
British Columbia	Cascade	27–21	2025 (Fayette Bracket)
Campbellsville (KY)	Mid-South	31–17	2025 (Fayette Bracket)
Coastal Georgia	The Sun	37–12	2025 (Marion Bracket)
College of Idaho	Cascade	34–20	2025 (Ashland Bracket)
Cumberlands (KY)	Mid-South	36–18	2025 NAIA Softball World Series
Dordt (IA)	Great Plains	39–12	First appearance
Eastern Oregon	Cascade	38–11	2025 NAIA Softball World Series
Faulkner (AL)	Southern States	35–14	2018 (Bowling Green Bracket #2)
Grand View (IA)	Heart	37–16	2025 NAIA Softball World Series
Marian (IN)	Crossroads	34–16	2025 NAIA Softball World Series
Mobile (AL)	Southern States	35–15	2025 (Williamsburg Bracket)
Oregon Tech	Cascade	41–8	2025 (Klamath Falls Bracket)
Southeastern (FL)	The Sun	41–13	2025 (Klamath Falls Bracket)
St. Thomas (FL)	The Sun	31–20	2025 (Lawrenceville Bracket)
Tennessee Southern	Southern States	30–17	2025 (Fayette Bracket)
Texas A&M–Texarkana	Red River	37–14	2025 (Williamsburg Bracket)

== Opening Round ==
=== Ashland Bracket ===
Hosted by Southern Oregon University at Laurel Park

First Round
4	Dordt (IA)	2
5	OUAZ	0
First Elimination Game
5	OUAZ	1
3	Saint Francis (IN)	7

Second Round
1	Southern Oregon	3
4	Dordt (IA)	1
2	Texas A&M–Texarkana	5
3	Saint Francis (IN)	4
Second Elimination Game
4	Dordt (IA)	7
3	Saint Francis (IN)	5

Semifinal
1	Southern Oregon	5
2	Texas A&M–Texarkana	2
Third Elimination Game
2	Texas A&M–Texarkana	2
4	Dordt (IA)	7

Championship
1	Southern Oregon	10^{(6)}	–
4	Dordt (IA)	2	–

=== Chickasha Bracket ===
Hosted by the University of Science and Arts of Oklahoma at Bill Smith Ballpark

First Round
4	Morningside (IA)	1
5	Friends (KS)	0
First Elimination Game
5	Friends (KS)	1
2	LSU–Alexandria	10^{(5)}

Second Round
1	Science & Arts (OK)	9^{(6)}
4	Morningside (IA)	1
2	LSU–Alexandria	4
3	College of Idaho	7
Second Elimination Game
4	Morningside (IA)	3
2	LSU–Alexandria	11^{(6)}

Semifinal
1	Science & Arts (OK)	3
3	College of Idaho	6
Third Elimination Game
1	Science & Arts (OK)	2
2	LSU–Alexandria	9

Championship
3	College of Idaho	10	–
2	LSU–Alexandria	6	–

=== Columbia Bracket ===
Hosted by Lindsey Wilson University at Marilyn D. Sparks Park

First Round
4	Tennessee Southern	2
5	Johnson (TN)	3
First Elimination Game
4	Tennessee Southern	8
2	Missouri Baptist	3

Second Round
1	Lindsey Wilson (KY)	4
5	Johnson (TN)	0
2	Missouri Baptist	4
3	Indiana Wesleyan	6^{(9)}
Second Elimination Game
5	Johnson (TN)	8
4	Tennessee Southern	6

Semifinal
1	Lindsey Wilson (KY)	3
3	Indiana Wesleyan	11
Third Elimination Game
1	Lindsey Wilson (KY)	1
5	Johnson (TN)	3

Championship
3	Indiana Wesleyan	10^{(6)}	–
5	Johnson (TN)	2	–

=== Fayette Bracket ===
Hosted by Central Methodist University at Cox Softball Complex

First Round
1	Madonna (MI)	6
4	IU Southeast	0
2	Midland (NE)	5
3	Central Methodist (MO)	4
First Elimination Game
4	IU Southeast	7
3	Central Methodist (MO)	8

Semifinal
1	Madonna (MI)	4
2	Midland (NE)	1
Second Elimination Game
2	Midland (NE)	0
3	Central Methodist (MO)	8^{(5)}

Championship
1	Madonna (MI)	1	–
3	Central Methodist (MO)	0	–

=== Hattiesburg Bracket ===
Hosted by William Carey University at Joseph & Nancy Fail Field

First Round
4	Marian (IN)	3
5	Columbia (MO)	1
First Elimination Game
5	Columbia (MO)	2
2	Coastal Georgia	3

Second Round
1	William Carey (MS)	0
4	Marian (IN)	1^{(11)}
2	Coastal Georgia	2
3	Georgia Gwinnett	3
Second Elimination Game
1	William Carey (MS)	7
2	Coastal Georgia	2

Semifinal
4	Marian (IN)	3
3	Georgia Gwinnett	0
Third Elimination Game
3	Georgia Gwinnett	3
1	William Carey (MS)	11^{(5)}

Championship
4	Marian (IN)	1	–
1	William Carey (MS)	0	–

=== Klamath Falls Bracket ===
Hosted by Oregon Tech at Stilwell Stadium

First Round
4	Arizona Christian	4
5	Dickinson State (ND)	8
First Elimination Game
4	Arizona Christian	5
3	St. Thomas (FL)	4

Second Round
1	Oregon Tech	4
5	Dickinson State (ND)	0
2	Our Lady of the Lake (TX)	13
3	St. Thomas (FL)	7
Second Elimination Game
5	Dickinson State (ND)	7
4	Arizona Christian	3

Semifinal
1	Oregon Tech	2
2	Our Lady of the Lake (TX)	1
Third Elimination Game
2	Our Lady of the Lake (TX)	9^{(13)}
5	Dickinson State (ND)	8

Championship
1	Oregon Tech	5	3
2	Our Lady of the Lake (TX)	8	5

=== Lakeland Bracket ===
Hosted by Southeastern University at Diamond Plex in Winter Haven, FL

First Round
1	Southeastern (FL)	1
4	Dillard (LA)	0
2	Evangel (MO)	0
3	Faulkner (AL)	5
First Elimination Game
4	Dillard (LA)	3
2	Evangel (MO)	7

Semifinal
1	Southeastern (FL)	2
3	Faulkner (AL)	3
Second Elimination Game
1	Southeastern (FL)	5
2	Evangel (MO)	1

Championship
3	Faulkner (AL)	3	0
1	Southeastern (FL)	5	1

=== Mobile Bracket ===
Hosted by University of Mobile at UM Softball Field

First Round
4	Indiana Tech	5
5	Truett McConnell (GA)	0
First Elimination Game
5	Truett McConnell (GA)	2
3	Campbellsville (KY)	3^{(8)}

Second Round
1	Mobile (AL)	8^{(6)}
4	Indiana Tech	0
2	Eastern Oregon	9
3	Campbellsville (KY)	8
Second Elimination Game
4	Indiana Tech	3
3	Campbellsville (KY)	1

Semifinal
1	Mobile (AL)	2
2	Eastern Oregon	4
Third Elimination Game
1	Mobile (AL)	2
4	Indiana Tech	0

Championship
2	Eastern Oregon	1	4
1	Mobile (AL)	7	5

=== Oklahoma City Bracket ===
Hosted by Oklahoma City University at Ann Lacy Stadium

First Round
4	British Columbia	6
5	Williams Baptist (AR)	0
First Elimination Game
5	Williams Baptist (AR)	3
3	Blue Mountain Christian (MS)	4

Second Round
1	Oklahoma City (OK)	1
4	British Columbia	2
2	Grand View (IA)	2
3	Blue Mountain Christian (MS)	1
Second Elimination Game
1	Oklahoma City (OK)	1
3	Blue Mountain Christian (MS)	0

Semifinal
4	British Columbia	5
2	Grand View (IA)	3
Third Elimination Game
2	Grand View (IA)	2
1	Oklahoma City (OK)	8

Championship
4	British Columbia	3	2
1	Oklahoma City (OK)	16	1

=== Williamsburg Bracket ===
Hosted by the University of the Cumberlands at UC Softball Complex

First Round
4	Benedictine (KS)	9^{(6)}
5	Oakland City (IN)	1
First Elimination Game
5	Oakland City (IN)	1
2	Saint Xavier (IL)	4

Second Round
1	Keiser (FL)	4^{(8)}
4	Benedictine (KS)	3
2	Saint Xavier (IL)	4
3	Cumberlands (KY)	5^{(9)}
Second Elimination Game
4	Benedictine (KS)	3
2	Saint Xavier (IL)	7

Semifinal
1	Keiser (FL)	2
3	Cumberlands (KY)	1
Third Elimination Game
3	Cumberlands (KY)	3
2	Saint Xavier (IL)	2

Championship
1	Keiser (FL)	3	3
3	Cumberlands (KY)	6	6

== NAIA Softball World Series ==
The NAIA Softball World Series was held at South Commons Complex in Columbus, Georgia from May 21 to 28.

=== Participants ===
School	Conference	Record	Head Coach	Bracket	Previous NAIA WS Appearances	Best NAIA WS Finish	NAIA WS Record
British Columbia	Cascade	31–22	Jennifer McKellar	Oklahoma City	none	none	0–0
College of Idaho	Cascade	37–20	Al Mendiola	Chickasha	4 (last: 2021)	3rd (2021)	7–8
Cumberlands (KY)	Mid-South	40–19	Bruce Leiniton	Williamsburg	3 (last: 2025)	3rd (2023)	4–6
Indiana Wesleyan	Crossroads	40–13	Kelsey Kooistra	Columbia	4 (last: 2022)	T-5th (2022)	3–8
Madonna (MI)	Wolverine-Hoosier	48–4	Ron Pezzoni	Fayette	6 (last: 2024)	T-5th (2021, 2024)	9–10
Marian (IN)	Crossroads	38–16	Scott Fleming	Hattiesburg	7 (last: 2025)	4th (2023)	7–14
Mobile (AL)	Southern States	39–16	Alison Sellers-Cook	Mobile	21 (last: 2022)	1st (2006)	55–42
Our Lady of the Lake (TX)	Red River	43–11	Amanda Davila	Klamath Falls	2 (last: 2024)	1st (2024)	4–2
Southeastern (FL)	The Sun	45–14	Kayla Watkins	Lakeland	2 (last: 2022)	3rd (2016, 2022)	5–4
Southern Oregon	Cascade	39–11	Jessica Pistole	Ashland	15 (last: 2025)	1st (2019, 2021, 2023, 2025)	28–9

=== Bracket ===
First round Thursday, May 21	First round Thursday, May 21; Second round Saturday, May 23	Third round Monday, May 25	Fourth Round; Tuesday, May 26	Championship; Thursday, May 28
1	Madonna (MI)	6
8	Indiana Wesleyan	4^{(8)}	8	Indiana Wesleyan	3
1	Madonna (MI)	5
9	Marian (IN)	3
4	Mobile (AL)	2
4	Mobile (AL)	9^{(5)}
5	Our Lady of the Lake (TX)	1
1	Madonna (MI)	8
2	Southeastern (FL)	2
2	Southeastern (FL)	3
7	College of Idaho	4	7	College of Idaho	1
2	Southeastern (FL)	5
10	British Columbia	3
3	Southern Oregon	2
3	Southern Oregon	4
6	Cumberlands (KY)	2	1	Madonna (MI)	8	–
2	Southeastern (FL)	4	–
First round Friday, May 22; Saturday, May 23; Losers eliminated	Second round Saturday, May 23; Sunday, May 24; Losers eliminated	Third round Monday, May 25; Tuesday, May 26; Losers eliminated	Fourth Round; Tuesday, May 26; Wednesday, May 27; Loser eliminated	Semifinal; Wednesday, May 27
4	Mobile (AL)	0
7	College of Idaho	0	5	Our Lady of the Lake (TX)	1	2	Southeastern (FL)	3
9	Marian (IN)	2	5	Our Lady of the Lake (TX)	6	5	Our Lady of the Lake (TX)	2^{(10)}	5	Our Lady of the Lake (TX)	0
5	Our Lady of the Lake (TX)	10^{(6)}	8	Indiana Wesleyan	1
3	Southern Oregon	1
8	Indiana Wesleyan	1^{(8)}	8	Indiana Wesleyan	3
6	Cumberlands (KY)	1	10	British Columbia	0
10	British Columbia	2

=== Game Results ===
All game times are listed in Eastern Time (UTC−05:00).

Thursday, May 21; 10:00 am Game 1	(9) Marian (IN)	3–4 (F/8)	(8) Indiana Wesleyan	South Commons Complex; Umpires: HP: Jay Motter, 1B: Brian Soule, 3B: Colene Adams
Thursday, May 21; 10:00 am Game 1	LP: Macy Coan (21–5)	Boxscore	WP: Isabelle Beidelschies (16–7)	South Commons Complex; Umpires: HP: Jay Motter, 1B: Brian Soule, 3B: Colene Adams

Thursday, May 21; 1:00 pm Game 2	(5) Our Lady of the Lake (TX)	1–9 (F/5)	(4) Mobile (AL)	South Commons Complex; Umpires: HP: Steve Meeker, 1B: Lauren Eisenreich, 3B: Michael Brown
Thursday, May 21; 1:00 pm Game 2	LP: Annika Litterio (26–9)	Boxscore	WP: Avery Harrell (20–8)	South Commons Complex; Umpires: HP: Steve Meeker, 1B: Lauren Eisenreich, 3B: Michael Brown

Thursday, May 21; 4:00 pm Game 3	(6) Cumberlands (KY)	2–4	(3) Southern Oregon	South Commons Complex; Umpires: HP: Brian Soule, 1B: Colene Adams, 3B: Jay Motter
Thursday, May 21; 4:00 pm Game 3	LP: Jessica Cord (24–14)	Boxscore	WP: Ayla Davies (27–7)	South Commons Complex; Umpires: HP: Brian Soule, 1B: Colene Adams, 3B: Jay Motter
Thursday, May 21; 4:00 pm Game 3	HR: Grace Ross (19)	Boxscore		South Commons Complex; Umpires: HP: Brian Soule, 1B: Colene Adams, 3B: Jay Motter

Thursday, May 21; 7:00 pm Game 4	(10) British Columbia	3–4	(7) College of Idaho	South Commons Complex; Umpires: HP: Lauren Eisenreich, 1B: Michael Brown, 3B: Steve Meeker
Thursday, May 21; 7:00 pm Game 4	LP: Carleen Murray (21–13)	Boxscore	WP: Drew Williams (15–9)	South Commons Complex; Umpires: HP: Lauren Eisenreich, 1B: Michael Brown, 3B: Steve Meeker

Friday, May 22; 10:00 am Game 5	(9) Marian (IN)	2–10 (F/6)	(5) Our Lady of the Lake (TX)	South Commons Complex; Umpires: HP: Michael Brown, 1B: Jay Motter, 3B: Brian Soule
Friday, May 22; 10:00 am Game 5	LP: Macy Coan (21–6)	Boxscore	WP: Annika Litterio (27–9)	South Commons Complex; Umpires: HP: Michael Brown, 1B: Jay Motter, 3B: Brian Soule
Friday, May 22; 10:00 am Game 5		Boxscore	HR: Marisa Rosales (6)	South Commons Complex; Umpires: HP: Michael Brown, 1B: Jay Motter, 3B: Brian Soule

Friday, May 22 (Note: Game was suspended in the 5th inning on Friday due to severe weather with game being completed on Saturday, May 23.); 1:00 pm Game 6	(10) British Columbia	2–1	(6) Cumberlands (KY)	South Commons Complex; Umpires: HP: Colene Adams, 1B: Steve Meeker, 3B: Lauren Eisenreich
Friday, May 22; 1:00 pm Game 6	WP: Carleen Murray (22–13)	Boxscore	LP: Jessica Cord (24–15)	South Commons Complex; Umpires: HP: Colene Adams, 1B: Steve Meeker, 3B: Lauren Eisenreich

Saturday, May 23 (Note: Game pushed back from Friday, May 22 to Saturday, May 23 due to severe weather.); 11:30 am Game 7	(8) Indiana Wesleyan	3–6	(1) Madonna (MI)	South Commons Complex; Umpires: HP: Jay Motter, 1B: Brian Soule, 3B: Michael Brown
Saturday, May 23; 11:30 am Game 7	LP: Avery Toole (20–4)	Boxscore	WP: Anna Battagin (7–1)	South Commons Complex; Umpires: HP: Jay Motter, 1B: Brian Soule, 3B: Michael Brown

Saturday, May 23; 3:05 pm Game 8	(7) College of Idaho	1–3	(2) Southeastern (FL)	South Commons Complex; Umpires: HP: Lauren Eisenreich, 1B: Steve Meeker, 3B: Colene Adams
Saturday, May 23; 3:05 pm Game 8	LP: Kina Watts (11–3)	Boxscore	WP: Edan Playa (18–4)	South Commons Complex; Umpires: HP: Lauren Eisenreich, 1B: Steve Meeker, 3B: Colene Adams

Saturday, May 23 (Note: Game suspended after two innings on Saturday due to severe weather with game being completed on Sunday, May 24.); 5:40 pm Game 9	(10) British Columbia	0–1 (F/8)	(8) Indiana Wesleyan	South Commons Complex; Umpires: HP: Brian Soule, 1B: Michael Brown, 3B: Jay Motter
Saturday, May 23; 5:40 pm Game 9	LP: Carleen Murray (22–14)	Boxscore	WP: Avery Toole (21–4)	South Commons Complex; Umpires: HP: Brian Soule, 1B: Michael Brown, 3B: Jay Motter

Sunday, May 24 (Note: Game pushed back from Saturday, May 24 to Sunday, May 25 due to severe weather.) (Note: Game suspended in the top of the 1st inning due to heavy rain with game being completed on Monday, May 25.); 7:10 pm Game 10	(7) College of Idaho	0–6	(5) Our Lady of the Lake (TX)	South Commons Complex; Umpires: HP: Colene Adams, 1B: Lauren Eisenreich, 3B: Steve Meeker
Sunday, May 24; 7:10 pm Game 10	LP: Kina Watts (11–4)	Boxscore	WP: Annika Litterio (28–9)	South Commons Complex; Umpires: HP: Colene Adams, 1B: Lauren Eisenreich, 3B: Steve Meeker

Monday, May 25 (Note: Game pushed back from Saturday, May 23 to Monday, May 25 due to severe weather.); 2:10 pm Game 11	(3) Southern Oregon	2–5	(2) Southeastern (FL)	South Commons Complex; Umpires: HP: Michael Brown, 1B: Jay Motter, 3B: Colene Adams
Monday, May 25; 2:10 pm Game 11	LP: Ayla Davies (27–8)	Boxscore	WP: Maria Zelenka (18–3)	South Commons Complex; Umpires: HP: Michael Brown, 1B: Jay Motter, 3B: Colene Adams

Monday, May 25; 6:15 pm Game 12	(4) Mobile (AL)	2–5	(1) Madonna (MI)	South Commons Complex; Umpires: HP: Steve Meeker, 1B: Brian Soule, 3B: Jay Motter
Monday, May 25; 6:15 pm Game 12	LP: Avery Harrell (20–8)	Boxscore	WP: Camille Oyer (23–0); Sv: Anna Battagin (3)	South Commons Complex; Umpires: HP: Steve Meeker, 1B: Brian Soule, 3B: Jay Motter
Monday, May 25; 6:15 pm Game 12		Boxscore	HR: Ashley Rosiewicz (15)	South Commons Complex; Umpires: HP: Steve Meeker, 1B: Brian Soule, 3B: Jay Motter

Monday, May 25; 8:15 pm Game 13	(8) Indiana Wesleyan	3–1	(3) Southern Oregon	South Commons Complex; Umpires: HP: Lauren Eisenreich, 1B: Colene Adams, 3B: Michael Brown
Monday, May 25; 8:15 pm Game 13	WP: Avery Toole (22–4)	Boxscore	LP: Ayla Davies (27–9)	South Commons Complex; Umpires: HP: Lauren Eisenreich, 1B: Colene Adams, 3B: Michael Brown

Tuesday, May 26 (Note: Game pushed back from Monday, May 25 to Tuesday, May 26 due to multiple severe weather delays.); 10:00 am Game 14	(5) Our Lady of the Lake (TX)	1–0	(4) Mobile (AL)	South Commons Complex; Umpires: HP: Jay Motter, 1B: Steve Meeker, 3B: Lauren Eisenreich
Tuesday, May 26; 10:00 am Game 14	WP: Annika Litterio (29–9)	Boxscore	LP: Avery Harrell (20–10)	South Commons Complex; Umpires: HP: Jay Motter, 1B: Steve Meeker, 3B: Lauren Eisenreich

Tuesday, May 26; 12:00 pm Game 15	(2) Southeastern (FL)	2–8	(1) Madonna (MI)	South Commons Complex; Umpires: HP: Brian Soule, 1B: Lauren Eisenreich, 2B: Colene Adams, 3B: Steve Meeker
Tuesday, May 26; 12:00 pm Game 15	LP: Edan Playa (18–5)	Boxscore	WP: Camille Oyer (24–0)	South Commons Complex; Umpires: HP: Brian Soule, 1B: Lauren Eisenreich, 2B: Colene Adams, 3B: Steve Meeker
Tuesday, May 26; 12:00 pm Game 15		Boxscore	HR: Jessica Dunkel (2)	South Commons Complex; Umpires: HP: Brian Soule, 1B: Lauren Eisenreich, 2B: Colene Adams, 3B: Steve Meeker

Tuesday, May 26 (Note: Game suspended in the bottom of the 4th due to heavy rain and was completed on Wednesday, May 27.); 2:50 pm Game 16	(8) Indiana Wesleyan	1–2 (F/10)	(5) Our Lady of the Lake (TX)	South Commons Complex; Umpires: HP: Michael Brown, 1B: Colene Adams, 2B: Jay Motter, 3B: Brian Soule
Tuesday, May 26; 2:50 pm Game 16	LP: Avery Toole (22–5)	Boxscore	WP: Annika Litterio (30–9)	South Commons Complex; Umpires: HP: Michael Brown, 1B: Colene Adams, 2B: Jay Motter, 3B: Brian Soule

Wednesday, May 27 (Note: Game moved from Tuesday, May 26 to Wednesday, May 27 due to heavy rain.); 12:40 pm Game 17	(5) Our Lady of the Lake (TX)	0–3	(2) Southeastern (FL)	South Commons Complex; Umpires: HP: Steve Meeker, 1B: Michael Brown, 2B: Brian Soule, 3B: Colene Adams
Wednesday, May 27; 12:40 pm Game 17	LP: Annika Litterio (30–10)	Boxscore	WP: Maria Zelenka (19–3)	South Commons Complex; Umpires: HP: Steve Meeker, 1B: Michael Brown, 2B: Brian Soule, 3B: Colene Adams

==== Championship Game ====
Thursday, May 28, 11:00 am at South Commons Complex, Columbus, GA Game 18
Team	1	2	3	4	5	6	7	R	H	E
Southeastern (FL)	0	0	2	2	0	0	0	4	8	2
Madonna (MI)	0	0	4	3	0	1	X	8	11	1
WP: Anna Battagin (8–1) LP: Edan Playa (18–5); Home runs: SEU: None; Madonna: None; Umpires: HP: Lauren Eisenreich, 1B: Brian Soule, 2B: Michael Brown, 3B: Jay Motter; Boxscore

== See also ==
- 2026 NAIA baseball tournament
- 2026 NCAA Division I softball tournament
- 2026 NCAA Division II softball tournament
- 2026 NCAA Division III softball tournament
