= 2025 NAIA softball tournament =

College softball tournament

- Teams: 48
- Finals site: South Commons Complex; Columbus, Georgia
- Champions: Southern Oregon (4th title)
- Winning coach: Jessica Pistole
- MVP: Ayla Davies (Southern Oregon)

The 2025 NAIA softball tournament was the 44th edition of the NAIA softball championship. The 48-team tournament began on May 11 with Opening Round games across ten different sites and concluded with the 2026 NAIA Softball World Series in Columbus, Georgia that started on May 21 and ended on May 28.

After losing to Marian (IN) in the first game of the World Series, Southern Oregon won five straight elimination games, then defeated Oklahoma City (OK) 6–0 to force a winner-take-all championship game. Southern Oregon then beat Oklahoma City again in the second championship game 6–3 to capture their fourth national championship becoming the first team since the format change in 2013 (which removed pool play) to emerge from the elimination bracket an win the national title. Ayla Davies of Southern Oregon won the tournament MVP.

The 48 participating teams were selected from all eligible NAIA teams. 29 teams were awarded automatic bids as either champions and/or runners-up of their conferences and 19 teams were selected at-large by the National Selection Committee. Teams were then placed into one of ten pre-determined Opening Round sites, with eight sites consisting of five teams and two sites consisting of four teams, each of which is conducted via a double-elimination tournament. The winners of each of the Opening Round sites will advance to the NAIA Softball World Series.

== Tournament procedure ==
A total of 48 teams entered the tournament. 29 automatic bids were determined by either winning their conference's regular season championship, conference tournament, and/or conference tournament runner-up. The other 19 bids were at-large selected by the NAIA Softball National Selection Committee.

== Opening round hosts ==
On May 1, the NAIA announced the ten opening round host sites, which were played from May 11–15.

Opening Round hosts

| Venue | Location | Host |
|---|---|---|
| Cox Stadium Complex | Fayette, MO | Central Methodist University |
| UC Softball Complex | Williamsburg, KY | University of the Cumberlands |
| Grizzly Softball Complex | Lawrenceville, GA | Georgia Gwinnett College |
| Sue Bowman Field | Marion, IN | Indiana Wesleyan University |
| Open Space Park | Sioux Center, IA | Northwestern College |
| Ann Lacy Stadium | Oklahoma City, OK | Oklahoma City University |
| Stilwell Stadium | Klamath Falls, OR | Oregon Tech |
| St. Mary's University Softball Field | San Antonio, TX | Our Lady of the Lake University |
| Bill Smith Ballpark | Chickasha, OK | University of Science and Arts of Oklahoma |
| University Softball Field | Ashland, OR | Southern Oregon University |

== Bids ==
=== Automatic ===
| School | Conference | Record | Berth | Last NAIA Appearance |
|---|---|---|---|---|
| Arizona Christian | Great Southwest | 27–24 | Tournament champion | 2016 (St. Gregory Bracket) |
| Central Baptist (AR) | American Midwest | 31–25 | Tournament runner-up | 2021 (Hattiesburg Bracket) |
| Central Methodist (MO) | Heart | 38–9 | Regular season champion | 2024 NAIA Softball World Series |
| Cumberlands (KY) | Mid-South | 37–7 | Tournament champion | 2024 NAIA Softball World Series |
| Eastern Oregon | Cascade | 32–9 | Tournament champion | 2024 (Lawrenceville Bracket) |
| Evangel (MO) | Kansas | 40–10 | Tournament champion | 2024 (San Antonio Bracket) |
| Friends (KS) | Kansas | 36–13 | Regular season champion | 2024 (Chickasha Bracket) |
| Georgia Gwinnett | Continental | 43–8 | Tournament champion | 2024 NAIA Softball World Series |
| Grand View (IA) | Heart | 37–13 | Tournament champion | 2024 (Sioux Center Bracket) |
| Indiana Wesleyan | Crossroads | 43–9 | Tournament runner-up | 2024 (Fayette Bracket) |
| Jamestown (ND) | North Star | 35–15 | Tournament champion | 2018 (Dodge City Bracket) |
| Johnson (TN) | Appalachian | 29–13 | Tournament champion | First appearance |
| LSU–Alexandria | Red River | 46–7 | Best record in Conference & Tournament play | 2024 (Chickasha Bracket) |
| Madonna (MI) | Wolverine-Hoosier | 44–8 | Regular season champion | 2024 NAIA Softball World Series |
| Marian (IN) | Crossroads | 44–7 | Co-Regular season champion | 2024 (Indianapolis Bracket) |
| Middle Georgia State | Southern States | 38–8 | Tournament champion | 2024 (Indianapolis Bracket) |
| Missouri Baptist | American Midwest | 44–6 | Regular season champion | 2024 (Lawrenceville Bracket) |
| Morningside (IA) | Great Plains | 33–17 | Tournament runner-up | 2021 (Southern Oregon Bracket) |
| Northwestern (IA) | Great Plains | 46–11 | Regular season champion | 2024 (Sioux Center Bracket) |
| Northwestern Ohio | Wolverine-Hoosier | 35–16 | Tournament champion | 2018 (Lawrenceville Bracket) |
| Oklahoma City (OK) | Sooner | 46–8 | Tournament runner-up | 2024 NAIA Softball World Series |
| Oregon Tech | Cascade | 42–9 | Co-Regular season champion | 2024 NAIA Softball World Series |
| Our Lady of the Lake (TX) | Red River | 45–7 | Regular season champion | 2024 NAIA Softball World Series |
| Reinhardt (GA) | Appalachian | 28–10 | Regular season champion | 2024 (Hattiesburg Bracket) |
| Rio Grande (OH) | River States | 44–9 | Tournament champion | 2024 (Indianapolis Bracket) |
| Saint Xavier (IL) | Chicagoland | 36–6 | Tournament champion | 2024 (Sioux Center Bracket) |
| Science & Arts (OK) | Sooner | 47–7 | Regular season champion | 2024 NAIA Softball World Series |
| St. Thomas (FL) | The Sun | 44–6 | Tournament champion | 2024 (Klamath Falls Bracket) |
| Stillman (LA) | HBCU | 33–11 | Tournament champion | 2024 (Hattiesburg Bracket) |

=== At–Large ===
| School | Conference | Record | Last NAIA Appearance |
|---|---|---|---|
| Baker (KS) | Heart | 29–17 | 2024 (Chickasha Bracket) |
| British Columbia | Cascade | 26–18 | First appearance |
| Campbellsville (KY) | Mid-South | 27–16 | 2023 (San Antonio Bracket) |
| Coastal Georgia | The Sun | 35–17 | 2024 (Williamsburg Bracket) |
| College of Idaho | Cascade | 26–18 | 2024 (Fayette Bracket) |
| Cornerstone (MI) | Wolverine-Hoosier | 35–14 | 2014 (Lindsey Wilson Bracket) |
| Embry–Riddle (AZ) | Great Southwest | 27–11 | 2024 (Klamath Falls Bracket) |
| Freed–Hardeman (TN) | Mid-South | 20–15 | 2024 (Oklahoma City Bracket) |
| Hope International (CA) | Great Southwest | 35–13 | 2024 (San Antonio Bracket) |
| Houston–Victoria (TX) | Red River | 29–21 | 2024 (Oklahoma City Bracket) |
| Keiser (FL) | The Sun | 39–15 | First appearance |
| Midland (NE) | Great Plains | 37–15 | 2024 (Chickasha Bracket) |
| Mobile (AL) | Southern States | 32–18 | 2023 (Chickasha Bracket) |
| Southeastern (FL) | The Sun | 40–9 | 2024 (Lawrenceville Bracket) |
| Southern Oregon | Cascade | 45–8 | 2024 NAIA Softball World Series |
| Tennessee Southern (Note: Tennessee Southern was known as Martin Methodist (TN) when they made their last tournament appearance.) | Southern States | 30–19 | 2016 (LSU–Alexandria Bracket) |
| Texas A&M–Texarkana | Red River | 39–10 | 2022 (Oklahoma City Bracket) |
| Thomas (GA) | Southern States | 29–20 | 2018 (Gulf Shores Bracket) |
| William Carey (MS) | Southern States | 38–15 | 2024 (Hattiesburg Bracket) |

=== By conference ===
| Conference | Total | Schools |
|---|---|---|
| Cascade | 5 | British Columbia, College of Idaho, Eastern Oregon, Oregon Tech, Southern Oregon |
| Southern States | 5 | Middle Georgia State, Mobile (AL), Tennessee Southern, Thomas (GA), William Carey (MS) |
| Red River | 4 | Houston–Victoria (TX), LSU–Alexandria, Our Lady of the Lake (TX), Texas A&M–Texarkana |
| The Sun | 4 | Coastal Georgia, Keiser (FL), Southeastern (FL), St. Thomas (FL) |
| Great Plains | 3 | Midland (NE), Morningside (IA), Northwestern (IA) |
| Great Southwest | 3 | Arizona Christian, Embry–Riddle (AZ), Hope International (CA) |
| Heart | 3 | Baker (KS), Central Methodist (MO), Grand View (IA) |
| Mid-South | 3 | Campbellsville (KY), Cumberlands (KY), Freed–Hardeman (TN) |
| Wolverine-Hoosier | 3 | Cornerstone (MI), Madonna (MI), Northwestern Ohio |
| American Midwest | 2 | Central Baptist (MO), Missouri Baptist |
| Appalachian | 2 | Johnson (TN), Reinhardt (GA) |
| Crossroads | 2 | Indiana Wesleyan, Marian (IN) |
| Kansas | 2 | Evangel (MO), Friends (KS) |
| Sooner | 2 | Oklahoma City (OK), Science & Arts (OK) |
| Chicagoland | 1 | Saint Xavier (IL) |
| Continental | 1 | Georgia Gwinnett |
| HBCU | 1 | Stillman (AL) |
| North Star | 1 | Jamestown (ND) |
| River States | 1 | Rio Grande (OH) |

== Opening Round ==
The Opening Round was held across ten different sites from May 11 to 15.

=== Ashland Bracket ===
Hosted by Southern Oregon University at University Softball Field

First Round
4 | Keiser (FL) | 6
5 | College of Idaho | 9
First Elimination Game
4 | Keiser (FL) | 0
2 | Saint Xavier (IL) | 7

Second Round
1 | Southern Oregon | 3
5 | College of Idaho | 1
2 | Saint Xavier (IL) | 1
3 | Hope International (CA) | 2
Second Elimination Game
5 | College of Idaho | 4
2 | Saint Xavier (IL) | 2

Semifinal
1 | Southern Oregon | 10^{(5)}
3 | Hope International (CA) | 2
Third Elimination Game
3 | Hope International (CA) | 6
5 | College of Idaho | 3

Championship
1 | Southern Oregon | 5 | –
3 | Hope International (CA) | 3 | –

=== Chickasha Bracket ===
Hosted by the University of Science and Arts of Oklahoma at Bill Smith Ballpark

First Round
1 | Science & Arts (OK) | 5
4 | Stillman (AL) | 3
2 | Grand View (IA) | 8^{(5)}
3 | Freed–Hardeman (TN) | 0
First Elimination Game
4 | Stillman (AL) | 6
3 | Freed–Hardeman (TN) | 7

Semifinal
1 | Science & Arts (OK) | 1
2 | Grand View (IA) | 3
Second Elimination Game
1 | Science & Arts (OK) | 8^{(5)}
3 | Freed–Hardeman (TN) | 0

Championship
2 | Grand View (IA) | 7 | 3
1 | Science & Arts (OK) | 10 | 1

=== Fayette Bracket ===
Hosted by Central Methodist University at Cox Stadium Complex

First Round
4 | Campbellsville (KY) | 0
5 | Tennessee Southern | 4
First Elimination Game
4 | Campbellsville (KY) | 1
3 | British Columbia | 2^{(10)}

Second Round
1 | LSU–Alexandria | 6
5 | Tennessee Southern | 0
2 | Central Methodist (MO) | 4
3 | British Columbia | 1
Second Elimination Game
5 | Tennessee Southern | 4
3 | British Columbia | 1

Semifinal
1 | LSU–Alexandria | 3
2 | Central Methodist (MO) | 4
Third Elimination Game
1 | LSU–Alexandria | 3
5 | Tennessee Southern | 7^{(8)}

Championship
2 | Central Methodist (MO) | 5 | –
5 | Tennessee Southern | 1 | –

=== Klamath Falls Bracket ===
Hosted by Oregon Tech at Stilwell Stadium

First Round
4 | Jamestown (ND) | 10
5 | Arizona Christian | 6
First Elimination Game
5 | Arizona Christian | 3
2 | Southeastern (FL) | 15^{(5)}

Second Round
1 | Oregon Tech | 4
4 | Jamestown (ND) | 2
2 | Southeastern (FL) | 3
3 | Midland (NE) | 6
Second Elimination Game
4 | Jamestown (ND) | 3
2 | Southeastern (FL) | 8

Semifinal
1 | Oregon Tech | 10
3 | Midland (NE) | 12
Third Elimination Game
1 | Oregon Tech | 2^{(8)}
2 | Southeastern (FL) | 1

Championship
3 | Midland (NE) | 0 | 5
1 | Oregon Tech | 2 | 3

=== Lawrenceville Bracket ===
Hosted by Georgia Gwinnett College at Grizzly Softball Complex

First Round
4 | Thomas (GA) | 3
5 | Johnson (TN) | 1
First Elimination Game
5 | Johnson (TN) | 2
3 | Evangel (MO) | 4

Second Round
1 | Georgia Gwinnett | 5
4 | Thomas (GA) | 1
2 | St. Thomas (FL) | 3^{(10)}
3 | Evangel (MO) | 2
Second Elimination Game
4 | Thomas (GA) | 0
3 | Evangel (MO) | 7

Semifinal
1 | Georgia Gwinnett | 3
2 | St. Thomas (FL) | 2
Third Elimination Game
2 | St. Thomas (FL) | 4
3 | Evangel (MO) | 0

Championship
1 | Georgia Gwinnett | 6 | –
2 | St. Thomas (FL) | 1 | –

=== Marion Bracket ===
Hosted by Indiana Wesleyan University at Sue Bowman Field

First Round
4 | Coastal Georgia | 1
5 | Reinhardt (GA) | 2
First Elimination Game
4 | Coastal Georgia | 4
2 | Indiana Wesleyan | 6

Second Round
1 | Madonna (MI) | 2
5 | Reinhardt (GA) | 4
2 | Indiana Wesleyan | 2
3 | Rio Grande (OH) | 4
Second Elimination Game
1 | Madonna (MI) | 7^{(8)}
2 | Indiana Wesleyan | 6

Semifinal
5 | Reinhardt (GA) | 7
3 | Rio Grande (OH) | 1
Third Elimination Game
3 | Rio Grande (OH) | 2
1 | Madonna (MI) | 0

Championship
5 | Reinhardt (GA) | 4 | –
3 | Rio Grande (OH) | 2 | –

=== Oklahoma City Bracket ===
Hosted by Oklahoma City University at Ann Lacy Stadium

First Round
4 | Houston–Victoria (TX) | 1
5 | Morningside (IA) | 2
First Elimination Game
4 | Houston–Victoria (TX) | 1
3 | William Carey (MS) | 7

Second Round
1 | Oklahoma City (OK) | 5
5 | Morningside (IA) | 0
2 | Missouri Baptist | 8
3 | William Carey (MS) | 2
Second Elimination Game
5 | Morningside (IA) | 8
3 | William Carey (MS) | 4

Semifinal
1 | Oklahoma City (OK) | 3
2 | Missouri Baptist | 5
Third Elimination Game
1 | Oklahoma City (OK) | 11^{(5)}
5 | Morningside (IA) | 1

Championship
2 | Missouri Baptist | 5 | 3
1 | Oklahoma City (OK) | 6 | 4^{(8)}

=== San Antonio Bracket ===
Hosted by Our Lady of the Lake University at St. Mary's University Softball Field

First Round
4 | Embry–Riddle (AZ) | 2
5 | Central Baptist (AR) | 1
First Elimination Game
5 | Central Baptist (AR) | 1
3 | Middle Georgia State | 9^{(6)}

Second Round
1 | Our Lady of the Lake (TX) | 3
4 | Embry–Riddle (AZ) | 1
2 | Eastern Oregon | 3
3 | Middle Georgia State | 2
Second Elimination Game
4 | Embry–Riddle (AZ) | 0
3 | Middle Georgia State | 1^{(9)}

Semifinal
1 | Our Lady of the Lake (TX) | 3
2 | Eastern Oregon | 4
Third Elimination Game
1 | Our Lady of the Lake (TX) | 7
3 | Middle Georgia State | 3

Championship
2 | Eastern Oregon | 3^{(8)} | –
1 | Our Lady of the Lake (TX) | 0 | –

=== Sioux Center Bracket ===
Hosted by the Northwestern College at Open Space Park

First Round
4 | Baker (KS) | 2
5 | Northwestern Ohio | 0
First Elimination Game
5 | Northwestern Ohio | 1
3 | Friends (KS) | 2

Second Round
1 | Northwestern (IA) | 3
4 | Baker (KS) | 2
2 | Marian (IN) | 5
3 | Friends (KS) | 4
Second Elimination Game
4 | Baker (KS) | 5
3 | Friends (KS) | 1

Semifinal
1 | Northwestern (IA) | 0
2 | Marian (IN) | 9^{(6)}
Third Elimination Game
1 | Northwestern (IA) | 3
4 | Baker (KS) | 2

Championship
2 | Marian (IN) | 10^{(6)} | –
1 | Northwestern (IA) | 2 | –

=== Williamsburg Bracket ===
Hosted by the University of the Cumberlands at UC Softball Complex

First Round
1 | Cumberlands (KY) | 7
4 | Cornerstone (MI) | 3
2 | Texas A&M–Texarkana | 4
3 | Mobile (AL) | 3
First Elimination Game
4 | Cornerstone (MI) | 3
3 | Mobile (AL) | 4

Semifinal
1 | Cumberlands (KY) | 5
2 | Texas A&M–Texarkana | 1
Second Elimination Game
2 | Texas A&M–Texarkana | 2
3 | Mobile (AL) | 1

Championship
1 | Cumberlands (KY) | 9^{(9)} | –
2 | Texas A&M–Texarkana | 8 | –

== NAIA Softball World Series ==
The NAIA Softball World Series was held at South Commons Complex in Columbus, Georgia from May 22 to 29.

=== Participants ===
| School | Conference | Record | Head Coach | Bracket | Previous NAIA WS Appearances | Best NAIA WS Finish | NAIA WS Record |
|---|---|---|---|---|---|---|---|
| Central Methodist (MO) | Heart | 41–9 | Pat Reardon | Fayette | 5 (last: 2024) | T-5th (2015) | 4–10 |
| Cumberlands (KY) | Mid-South | 40–7 | Bailey Dillender | Williamsburg | 2 (last: 2024) | 3rd (2023) | 4–4 |
| Eastern Oregon | Cascade | 35–9 | Nicole Christan | San Antonio | 2 (last: 2000) | 3rd (1999) | 5–4 |
| Georgia Gwinnett | Continental | 46–8 | Kat Ihlenburg | Lawrenceville | 4 (last: 2024) | 3rd (2019) | 6–8 |
| Grand View (IA) | Heart | 40–14 | Lou A. Yacinich | Chickasha | 2 (last: 2022) | T-7th (2022) | 2–5 |
| Marian (IN) | Crossroads | 47–7 | Scott Fleming | Sioux Center | 6 (last: 2024) | 4th (2023) | 6–12 |
| Midland (NE) | Great Plains | 40–16 | Beth Singleton | Klamath Falls | 3 (last: 2023) | T-7th (2023) | 4–9 |
| Oklahoma City (OK) | Sooner | 49–9 | Phil McSpadden | Oklahoma City | 34 (last: 2024) | 1st (1994, 1995, 1996, 1997, 2000, 2001, 2002, 2007, 2016, 2017, 2022) | 135–51 |
| Reinhardt (GA) | Appalachian | 32–10 | Matthew Wright | Marion | 4 (last: 2014) | 3rd (2014) | 6–8 |
| Southern Oregon | Cascade | 48–8 | Jessica Pistole | Ashland | 14 (last: 2024) | 1st (2019, 2021, 2023) | 21–8 |

=== Bracket ===
First round Thursday, May 22 | First round Thursday, May 22; Second round Friday, May 23 | Third round Saturday, May 24 | Fourth Round; Tuesday, May 27 | Championship; Wednesday, May 28; Thursday, May 29
1 | Cumberlands (KY) | 0
8 | Grand View (IA) | 8 | 8 | Grand View (IA) | 2
8 | Grand View (IA) | 0
9 | Midland (NE) | 3
4 | Oklahoma City (OK) | 8
4 | Oklahoma City (OK) | 13^{(5)}
5 | Central Methodist (MO) | 0
4 | Oklahoma City (OK) | 3
7 | Eastern Oregon | 1
2 | Georgia Gwinnett | 2
7 | Eastern Oregon | 1 | 7 | Eastern Oregon | 4
7 | Eastern Oregon | 8^{(5)}
10 | Reinhardt (GA) | 0
6 | Marian (IN) | 0
3 | Southern Oregon | 2
6 | Marian (IN) | 3^{(12)} | 4 | Oklahoma City (OK) | 0 | 3
3 | Southern Oregon | 6 | 6
First round Friday, May 23; Losers eliminated | Second round Saturday, May 24; Losers eliminated | Third round Monday, May 26; Losers eliminated | Fourth Round; Tuesday, May 27; Wednesday, May 28; Loser eliminated | Semifinal; Wednesday, May 28
6 | Marian (IN) | 6
1 | Cumberlands (KY) | 0 | 3 | Southern Oregon | 7^{(9)} | 7 | Eastern Oregon | 0
3 | Southern Oregon | 3 | 3 | Southern Oregon | 3 | 3 | Southern Oregon | 3 | 3 | Southern Oregon | 8^{(5)}
10 | Reinhardt (GA) | 1 | 2 | Georgia Gwinnett | 0
8 | Grand View (IA) | 0
2 | Georgia Gwinnett | 5 | 2 | Georgia Gwinnett | 2
9 | Midland (NE) | 3 | 5 | Central Methodist (MO) | 1
5 | Central Methodist (MO) | 11^{(6)}

=== Game Results ===
All game times are listed in Eastern Time (UTC−05:00).

| Thursday, May 22; 10:00 am Game 1 | (9) Midland (NE) | 3–8 | (8) Grand View (IA) | South Commons Complex; Umpires: HP: Steve Meeker, 1B: Jay Motter, 3B: Derek Smith |
| Thursday, May 22; 10:00 am Game 1 | LP: Campbell Petrick (17–8) | Boxscore | WP: Madi Huisman (16–9) | South Commons Complex; Umpires: HP: Steve Meeker, 1B: Jay Motter, 3B: Derek Smith |

| Thursday, May 22; 1:00 pm Game 2 | (6) Marian (IN) | 3–2 (F/12) | (3) Southern Oregon | South Commons Complex; Umpires: HP: Dustin Holton, 1B: Gavin Ramsey, 3B: John Smith |
| Thursday, May 22; 1:00 pm Game 2 | WP: Olivia Stunkel (30–0) | Boxscore | LP: Ayla Davies (31–5) | South Commons Complex; Umpires: HP: Dustin Holton, 1B: Gavin Ramsey, 3B: John Smith |
| Thursday, May 22; 1:00 pm Game 2 | HR: Abbey Hofmann (8) | Boxscore | | South Commons Complex; Umpires: HP: Dustin Holton, 1B: Gavin Ramsey, 3B: John Smith |

| Thursday, May 22; 4:00 pm Game 3 | (10) Reinhardt (GA) | 0–1 | (7) Eastern Oregon | South Commons Complex; Umpires: HP: Jay Motter, 1B: Derek Smith, 3B: Steve Meeker |
| Thursday, May 22; 4:00 pm Game 3 | LP: Anslie Pettit (20–4) | Boxscore | WP: Kylie Parsons (21–0) | South Commons Complex; Umpires: HP: Jay Motter, 1B: Derek Smith, 3B: Steve Meeker |

| Thursday, May 22; 7:00 pm Game 4 | (5) Central Methodist (MO) | 0–13 (F/5) | (4) Oklahoma City (OK) | South Commons Complex; Umpires: HP: Gavin Ramsey, 1B: John Smith, 3B: Dustin Holton |
| Thursday, May 22; 7:00 pm Game 4 | LP: Haley Cotter (18–5) | Boxscore | WP: Emersen Heron (25–5) | South Commons Complex; Umpires: HP: Gavin Ramsey, 1B: John Smith, 3B: Dustin Holton |
| Thursday, May 22; 7:00 pm Game 4 | | Boxscore | HR: Analise Rayburn 2 (27) | South Commons Complex; Umpires: HP: Gavin Ramsey, 1B: John Smith, 3B: Dustin Holton |

| Friday, May 23; 10:00 am Game 5 | (10) Reinhardt (GA) | 1–3 | (3) Southern Oregon | South Commons Complex; Umpires: HP: Derek Smith, 1B: Dustin Holton, 3B: Jay Motter |
| Friday, May 23; 10:00 am Game 5 | LP: Macy Langley (4–3) | Boxscore | WP: Ayla Davies (32–5) | South Commons Complex; Umpires: HP: Derek Smith, 1B: Dustin Holton, 3B: Jay Motter |
| Friday, May 23; 10:00 am Game 5 | | Boxscore | HR: Ari Williams (5) | South Commons Complex; Umpires: HP: Derek Smith, 1B: Dustin Holton, 3B: Jay Motter |

| Friday, May 23; 1:00 pm Game 6 | (9) Midland (NE) | 3–11 (F/6) | (5) Central Methodist (MO) | South Commons Complex; Umpires: HP: John Smith, 1B: Steve Meeker, 3B: Gavin Ramsey |
| Friday, May 23; 1:00 pm Game 6 | LP: Paeton Coler (16–10) | Boxscore | WP: Veronica Dearth (12–2) | South Commons Complex; Umpires: HP: John Smith, 1B: Steve Meeker, 3B: Gavin Ramsey |
| Friday, May 23; 1:00 pm Game 6 | | Boxscore | HR: Elizabeth Palumbo (11) | South Commons Complex; Umpires: HP: John Smith, 1B: Steve Meeker, 3B: Gavin Ramsey |

| Friday, May 23; 4:00 pm Game 7 | (8) Grand View (IA) | 2–0 | (1) Cumberlands (KY) | South Commons Complex; Umpires: HP: Jay Motter, 1B: Derek Smith, 3B: Dustin Holton |
| Friday, May 23; 4:00 pm Game 7 | WP: Madeline Waldorf (15–3) | Boxscore | LP: Lindsey Shope (23–4) | South Commons Complex; Umpires: HP: Jay Motter, 1B: Derek Smith, 3B: Dustin Holton |

| Friday, May 23; 7:00 pm Game 8 | (7) Eastern Oregon | 4–2 | (2) Georgia Gwinnett | South Commons Complex; Umpires: HP: Gavin Ramsey, 1B: John Smith, 3B: Steve Meeker |
| Friday, May 23; 7:00 pm Game 8 | WP: Kylie Parsons (22–0) | Boxscore | LP: Kailynn James (17–4) | South Commons Complex; Umpires: HP: Gavin Ramsey, 1B: John Smith, 3B: Steve Meeker |

| Saturday, May 24; 10:00 am Game 9 | (3) Southern Oregon | 3–0 | (1) Cumberlands (KY) | South Commons Complex; Umpires: HP: Dustin Holton, 1B: Steve Meeker, 3B: Gavin Ramsey |
| Saturday, May 24; 10:00 am Game 9 | WP: Ayla Davies (33–5) | Boxscore | LP: Lindsey Shope (23–5) | South Commons Complex; Umpires: HP: Dustin Holton, 1B: Steve Meeker, 3B: Gavin Ramsey |

| Saturday, May 24; 1:00 pm Game 10 | (5) Central Methodist (MO) | 1–5 | (2) Georgia Gwinnett | South Commons Complex; Umpires: HP: Derek Smith, 1B: John Smith, 3B: Jay Motter |
| Saturday, May 24; 1:00 pm Game 10 | LP: Haley Cotter (18–6) | Boxscore | WP: Annalise Jarvis (24–2) | South Commons Complex; Umpires: HP: Derek Smith, 1B: John Smith, 3B: Jay Motter |

| Saturday, May 24; 4:00 pm Game 11 | (4) Oklahoma City (OK) | 8–0 | (8) Grand View (IA) | South Commons Complex; Umpires: HP: Steve Meeker, 1B: Gavin Ramsey, 3B: Dustin Holton |
| Saturday, May 24; 4:00 pm Game 11 | WP: Emersen Heron (26–5) | Boxscore | LP: Madi Huisman (16–10) | South Commons Complex; Umpires: HP: Steve Meeker, 1B: Gavin Ramsey, 3B: Dustin Holton |
| Saturday, May 24; 4:00 pm Game 11 | HR: Kindalyn Miller (7) | Boxscore | | South Commons Complex; Umpires: HP: Steve Meeker, 1B: Gavin Ramsey, 3B: Dustin Holton |

| Saturday, May 24; 7:00 pm Game 12 | (7) Eastern Oregon | 8–0 (F/5) | (6) Marian (IN) | South Commons Complex; Umpires: HP: John Smith, 1B: Jay Motter, 3B: Derek Smith |
| Saturday, May 24; 7:00 pm Game 12 | WP: Kylie Parsons (23–0) | Boxscore | LP: Olivia Stunkel (30–1) | South Commons Complex; Umpires: HP: John Smith, 1B: Jay Motter, 3B: Derek Smith |
| Saturday, May 24; 7:00 pm Game 12 | HR: Kelly Monaghan (3) | Boxscore | | South Commons Complex; Umpires: HP: John Smith, 1B: Jay Motter, 3B: Derek Smith |

| Monday, May 26; 1:00 pm Game 13 | (6) Marian (IN) | 6–7 (F/9) | (3) Southern Oregon | South Commons Complex; Umpires: HP: Jay Motter, 1B: Gavin Ramsey, 2B: Dustin Holton, 3B: Steve Meeker |
| Monday, May 26; 1:00 pm Game 13 | LP: Olivia Stunkel (30–2) | Boxscore | WP: Ayla Davies (34–5) | South Commons Complex; Umpires: HP: Jay Motter, 1B: Gavin Ramsey, 2B: Dustin Holton, 3B: Steve Meeker |

| Monday, May 26; 4:00 pm Game 14 | (8) Grand View (IA) | 0–2 | (2) Georgia Gwinnett | South Commons Complex; Umpires: HP: John Smith, 1B: Steve Meeker, 2B: Gavin Ramsey, 3B: Derek Smith |
| Monday, May 26; 4:00 pm Game 14 | LP: Madeline Waldorf (15–4) | Boxscore | WP: Annalise Jarvis (25–2) | South Commons Complex; Umpires: HP: John Smith, 1B: Steve Meeker, 2B: Gavin Ramsey, 3B: Derek Smith |

| Tuesday, May 27 (Note: Game pushed back from Monday, May 26 due to inclement weather.); 11:00 am Game 15 | (4) Oklahoma City (OK) | 3–1 | (7) Eastern Oregon | South Commons Complex; Umpires: HP: Dustin Holton, 1B: Jay Motter, 2B: Steve Meeker, 3B: John Smith |
| Tuesday, May 27; 11:00 am Game 15 | WP: Emersen Heron (27–5) | Boxscore | LP: Kylie Parsons (23–1) | South Commons Complex; Umpires: HP: Dustin Holton, 1B: Jay Motter, 2B: Steve Meeker, 3B: John Smith |
| Tuesday, May 27; 11:00 am Game 15 | | Boxscore | HR: Emily Barry (11) | South Commons Complex; Umpires: HP: Dustin Holton, 1B: Jay Motter, 2B: Steve Meeker, 3B: John Smith |

| Tuesday, May 27 (Note: Game suspended in the bottom of the 4th due to heavy rain and was completed on Wednesday, May 28.); 1:30 pm Game 16 | (3) Southern Oregon | 3–0 | (2) Georgia Gwinnett | South Commons Complex; Umpires: HP: Derek Smith, 1B: Gavin Ramsey, 2B: John Smith, 3B: Jay Motter |
| Tuesday, May 27; 1:30 pm Game 16 | WP: Ayla Davies (35–5) | Boxscore | LP: Annalise Jarvis (25–3) | South Commons Complex; Umpires: HP: Derek Smith, 1B: Gavin Ramsey, 2B: John Smith, 3B: Jay Motter |
| Tuesday, May 27; 1:30 pm Game 16 | HR: Kennedy Kila (4) | Boxscore | | South Commons Complex; Umpires: HP: Derek Smith, 1B: Gavin Ramsey, 2B: John Smith, 3B: Jay Motter |

| Wednesday, May 28 (Note: Game pushed back from Tuesday, May 27 due to inclement weather.); 11:30 am Game 17 | (7) Eastern Oregon | 0–8 (F/5) | (3) Southern Oregon | South Commons Complex; Umpires: HP: Steve Meeker, 1B: Dustin Holton, 2B: Gavin Ramsey, 3B: Derek Smith |
| Wednesday, May 28; 11:30 am Game 17 | LP: Kylie Parsons (23–2) | Boxscore | WP: Ayla Davies (36–5) | South Commons Complex; Umpires: HP: Steve Meeker, 1B: Dustin Holton, 2B: Gavin Ramsey, 3B: Derek Smith |
| Wednesday, May 28; 11:30 am Game 17 | | Boxscore | HR: Sammie Pemberton (1) | South Commons Complex; Umpires: HP: Steve Meeker, 1B: Dustin Holton, 2B: Gavin Ramsey, 3B: Derek Smith |

==== Championship Games ====
===== First Game =====
Wednesday, May 28, 3:00 pm at South Commons Complex, Columbus, GA – Game 18
| Team | 1 | 2 | 3 | 4 | 5 | 6 | 7 | R | H | E |
|---|---|---|---|---|---|---|---|---|---|---|
| Oklahoma City (OK) | 0 | 0 | 0 | 0 | 0 | 0 | 0 | 0 | 4 | 2 |
| Southern Oregon | 4 | 0 | 0 | 0 | 0 | 2 | X | 6 | 8 | 0 |
WP: Ayla Davies (37–5) LP: Emersen Heron (27–6); Home runs: OCU: None; SOU: None; Umpires: HP: Gavin Ramsey, 1B: Dustin Holton, 2B: Derek Smith, 3B: Steve Meeker; Boxscore

===== Second Game =====
Thursday, May 29, 10:00 am at South Commons Complex, Columbus, GA – Game 19
| Team | 1 | 2 | 3 | 4 | 5 | 6 | 7 | R | H | E |
|---|---|---|---|---|---|---|---|---|---|---|
| Oklahoma City (OK) | 2 | 0 | 1 | 0 | 0 | 0 | 0 | 3 | 6 | 2 |
| Southern Oregon | 4 | 0 | 0 | 0 | 0 | 2 | X | 6 | 6 | 0 |
WP: Ayla Davies (38–5) LP: Emersen Heron (27–7); Home runs: OCU: Tara Hoehner (16), Analise Rayburn (28); SOU: Vanessa Lang (1); Umpires: HP: Jay Motter, 1B: Derek Smith, 2B: Dustin Holton, 3B: John Smith; Boxscore

== See also ==
- 2025 NAIA baseball tournament
- 2025 NCAA Division I softball tournament
- 2025 NCAA Division II softball tournament
- 2025 NCAA Division III softball tournament
