= 2024 NAIA softball tournament =

- Teams: 48
- Finals site: South Commons Complex; Columbus, Georgia
- Champions: Our Lady of the Lake (TX) (1st title)
- Winning coach: Bruce Lenington
- MVP: Cassandra Valdez (Our Lady of the Lake)

The 2024 NAIA softball tournament was the 43rd edition of the NAIA softball championship. The 48-team tournament began on May 13 with Opening Round games across ten different sites and concluded with the 2024 NAIA Softball World Series Columbus, Georgia that started on May 23 and ended on May 29.

Our Lady of the Lake (TX) won its first NAIA title, defeating Jessup (CA) 2–0. Cassandra Valdez of Our Lady of the Lake was named tournament MVP.

The 48 participating teams were selected from all eligible NAIA teams. 32 teams were awarded automatic bids as either champions and/or runners-up of their conferences and 16 teams were selected at-large by the National Selection Committee. Teams were then placed into one of ten pre-determined Opening Round sites, with eight sites consisting of five teams and two sites consisting of four teams, each of which was conducted via a double-elimination tournament. The winners of each of the Opening Round sites will advanced to the NAIA Softball World Series.

== Format ==
For the 2024 tournament, the field was expanded to 48 teams, with 32 receiving an automatic bid by either winning their conference's tournament, finishing as their conference tournament runner-up, or by finishing in first place in their conference. The remaining 16 bids were issued at large, with selections extended by the NAIA Selection Committee.

== Opening round hosts ==
On May 1, the NAIA announced the ten opening round host sites, which were played from May 13–16.

Opening Round hosts

Venue	Location	Host
Cox Softball Complex	Fayette, MO	Central Methodist University
UC Softball Complex	Williamsburg, KY	University of the Cumberlands
Grizzly Softball Complex	Lawrenceville, GA	Georgia Gwinnett College
Marian Softball Diamond	Indianapolis, IN	Marian University
Open Space Park	Sioux Center, IA	Northwestern College
Ann Lacy Stadium	Oklahoma City, OK	Oklahoma City University
Stilwell Stadium	Klamath Falls, OR	Oregon Tech
Bill Smith Ballpark	Chickasha, OK	University of Science and Arts of Oklahoma
St. Mary's University Softball Field	San Antonio, TX	Our Lady of the Lake University
Joseph & Nancy Fail Field	Hattiesburg, MS	William Carey University

== Bids ==
Conferences with 10 or more members received two automatic berths, while conferences with less than 10 received one. All conferences awarded a bid to their tournament champion.

=== Automatic ===
School	Conference	Record	Berth	Last NAIA Appearance
Aquinas (MI)	Wolverine-Hoosier	40–13	Tournament runner-up	2021 (Bowling Green Bracket) (Note: Aquinas (MI) qualified for the 2021 NAIA softball tournament but withdrew prior to the Opening Round due to COVID-19 issues.)
Benedictine (KS)	Heart	39–14	Tournament runner-up	First appearance
Central Methodist (MO)	Heart	48–4	Regular season champion	2023 NAIA Softball World Series
Cottey (MO)	American Midwest	31–19	Regular season champion	2023 (Chickasha Bracket)
Dickinson State (ND)	North Star	24–22	Tournament champion	2021 (Oklahoma City Bracket)
Eastern Oregon	Cascade	37–8	Tournament champion	2022 (Oklahoma City Bracket)
Embry–Riddle (AZ)	Cal-Pac	38–11	Tournament champion	2023 (Klamath Falls Bracket)
Evangel (MO)	Kansas	36–8	Regular season champion	2006 NAIA Softball World Series (Pool A)
Florida National	Continental	23–22	Tournament runner-up	First appearance
Freed–Hardeman (TN)	Mid-South	31–16	Tournament champion	2023 (Henderson Bracket)
Georgia Gwinnett	Continental	29–15	Tournament champion	2023 NAIA Softball World Series
Indiana Wesleyan	Crossroads	40–13	Tournament runner-up	2023 (Williamsburg Bracket)
IU Southeast	River States	34–16	Regular season champion	2023 (Baldwin City Bracket)
LSU–Alexandria	Red River	36–12	Tournament champion	2019 (Lawrenceville Bracket)
Madonna (MI)	Wolverine-Hoosier	48–3	Regular season champion	2023 (Williamsburg Bracket)
Marian (IN)	Crossroads	44–10	Regular season champion	2023 NAIA Softball World Series
Middle Georgia State	Southern States	33–14	Tournament runner-up	2023 (Indianapolis Bracket)
Midland (NE)	Great Plains	42–10	Tournament runner-up	2023 NAIA Softball World Series
Missouri Baptist	American Midwest	33–12	Regular season champion	First appearance
Northwestern (IA)	Great Plains	48–5	Regular season champion	2023 (Klamath Falls Bracket)
Oklahoma City (OK)	Sooner	49–3	Regular season champion	2023 (Oklahoma City Bracket)
Oregon Tech	Cascade	43–9	Regular season champion	2023 NAIA Softball World Series
Ottawa (KS)	Kansas	38–16	Regular season runner-up	2023 (Henderson Bracket)
Our Lady of the Lake (TX)	Red River	50–3	Regular season champion	2023 NAIA Softball World Series
Reinhardt (GA)	Appalachian	42–8	Regular season champion	2023 (Ashland Bracket)
Rio Grande (OH)	River States	34–17	Tournament champion	2022 (Klamath Falls Bracket)
Saint Xavier (IL)	Chicagoland	27–12	Tournament champion	2023 (Klamath Falls Bracket)
Science & Arts (OK)	Sooner	44–7	Tournament champion	2023 NAIA Softball World Series
St. Thomas (FL)	The Sun	38–10	Tournament champion	2014 (Concordia Bracket)
Tennessee Wesleyan	Appalachian	27–13	Tournament runner-up	2023 (Indianapolis Bracket)
Vanguard (CA)	Golden State	40–11	Tournament champion	2023 (Ashland Bracket)
William Carey (MS)	Southern States	38–12	Regular season champion	2022 (Hattiesburg Bracket)

=== At-Large ===
School	Conference	Record	Last NAIA Appearance
Baker (KS)	Heart	33–14	2023 NAIA Softball World Series
Bellevue (NE)	North Star	32–20	2019 (Dodge City Bracket)
Coastal Georgia	The Sun	36–12	2023 (Lawrenceville Bracket)
College of Idaho	Cascade	32–17	2023 (Baldwin City Bracket)
Cumberlands (KY)	Mid-South	44–7	2023 NAIA Softball World Series
Friends (KS)	Kansas	34–17	2011 NAIA Softball World Series (Pool A)
Grand View (IA)	Heart	33–17	2022 NAIA Softball World Series
Hope International (CA)	Golden State	35–15	2023 (San Antonio Bracket)
Houston–Victoria (TX)	Red River	32–12	2021 (Hattiesburg Bracket)
Jessup (CA)	Golden State	36–9	2022 (Klamath Falls Bracket)
Mid-America Christian (OK)	Sooner	36–15	First appearance
St. Francis (IL)	Chicagoland	29–14	2023 (Henderson Bracket)
Southeastern (FL)	The Sun	38–17	2023 (Ashland Bracket)
Southern Oregon	Cascade	42–11	2023 NAIA Softball World Series
Spring Arbor (MI)	Crossroads	33–20	1986 NAIA Softball World Series
Stillman (AL)	Southern States	35–13	First appearance

=== By conference ===
Conference	Total	Schools
Cascade	4	College of Idaho, Eastern Oregon, Oregon Tech, Southern Oregon
Heart	4	Baker (KS), Benedictine (KS), Central Methodist (MO), Grand View (IA)
Crossroads	3	Indiana Wesleyan, Marian (IN), Spring Arbor (MI)
Golden State	3	Jessup (CA), Hope International (CA), Vanguard (CA)
Kansas	3	Evangel (MO), Friends (KS), Ottawa (KS)
Red River	3	Houston–Victoria (TX), LSU–Alexandria, Our Lady of the Lake (TX)
Sooner	3	Mid-America Christian (OK), Oklahoma City (OK), Science & Arts (OK)
Southern States	3	Middle Georgia State, Stillman (AL), William Carey (MS)
The Sun	3	Coastal Georgia, Southeastern (FL), St. Thomas (FL)
American Midwest	2	Cottey (MO), Missouri Baptist
Appalachian	2	Reinhardt (GA), Tennessee Wesleyan
Chicagoland	2	Saint Xavier (IL), St. Francis (IL)
Continental	2	Georgia Gwinnett, Florida National
Great Plains	2	Midland (NE), Northwestern (IA)
Mid-South	2	Cumberlands (KY), Freed–Hardeman (TN)
North Star	2	Bellevue (NE), Dickinson State (ND)
River States	2	IU Southeast, Rio Grande (OH)
Wolverine-Hoosier	2	Aquinas (MI), Madonna (MI)
Cal-Pac	1	Embry–Riddle (AZ)

== Opening Round ==
The Opening Round was held from May 13 to 16.

=== Chickasha Bracket ===
Hosted by University of Science and Arts of Oklahoma at Bill Smith Ballpark

First round
4	Baker (KS)	3
5	Friends (KS)	0
First elimination round
5	Friends (KS)	0
3	LSU–Alexandria	1

Second round
1	Science & Arts (OK)	5
4	Baker (KS)	3
2	Midland (NE)	2
3	LSU–Alexandria	0
Second elimination round
4	Baker (KS)	1
3	LSU–Alexandria	7

Semifinals
1	Science & Arts (OK)	5
2	Midland (NE)	4
Third elimination round
2	Midland (NE)	5
3	LSU–Alexandria	2

Championship
1	Science & Arts (OK)	8^{(5)}	–
2	Midland (NE)	0	–

=== Fayette Bracket ===
Hosted by Central Methodist University at Cox Softball Complex

First round
4	Mid-America Christian (OK)	0
5	Dickinson State (ND)	2
First elimination round
4	Mid-America Christian (OK)	4
3	College of Idaho	0

Second round
1	Central Methodist (MO)	12^{(5)}
5	Dickinson State (ND)	0
2	Indiana Wesleyan	1
3	College of Idaho	0
Second elimination round
5	Dickinson State (ND)	3
4	Mid-America Christian (OK)	2

Semifinals
1	Central Methodist (MO)	3
2	Indiana Wesleyan	4
Third elimination round
1	Central Methodist (MO)	7
5	Dickinson State (ND)	0

Championship
2	Indiana Wesleyan	3	1
1	Central Methodist (MO)	8	4

=== Hattiesburg Bracket ===
Hosted by William Carey University at Joseph & Nancy Fail Field

First round
4	IU Southeast	3
5	Stillman (AL)	7
First elimination round
4	IU Southeast	1
3	Reinhardt (GA)	0

Second round
1	Jessup (CA)	6
5	Stillman (AL)	3
2	William Carey (MS)	3
3	Reinhardt (GA)	2
Second elimination round
5	Stillman (AL)	4
4	IU Southeast	1

Semifinals
1	Jessup (CA)	6
2	William Carey (MS)	3
Third elimination round
2	William Carey (MS)	10
5	Stillman (AL)	3

Championship
1	Jessup (CA)	2	4
2	William Carey (MS)	3	3

=== Indianapolis Bracket ===
Hosted by Marian University at Marian Softball Diamond

First round
4	Aquinas (MI)	2
5	Rio Grande (OH)	5
First elimination round
4	Aquinas (MI)	4
3	Middle Georgia State	1

Second round
1	Marian (IN)	6
5	Rio Grande (OH)	5
2	Southern Oregon	1
3	Middle Georgia State	0
Second elimination round
5	Rio Grande (OH)	0
4	Aquinas (MI)	8^{(5)}

Semifinals
1	Marian (IN)	1
2	Southern Oregon	6
Third elimination round
1	Marian (IN)	1^{(9)}
4	Aquinas (MI)	0

Championship
2	Southern Oregon	9	–
1	Marian (IN)	2	–

=== Klamath Falls Bracket ===
Hosted by Oregon Tech at Stilwell Stadium

First round
4	Embry–Riddle (AZ)	10^{(5)}
5	Florida National	0
First elimination round
5	Florida National	5
3	St. Thomas (FL)	6

Second round
1	Oregon Tech	4^{(8)}
4	Embry–Riddle (AZ)	3
2	Vanguard (CA)	8
3	St. Thomas (FL)	5
Second elimination round
4	Embry–Riddle (AZ)	0
3	St. Thomas (FL)	1

Semifinals
1	Oregon Tech	2
2	Vanguard (CA)	8
Third elimination round
1	Oregon Tech	7
3	St. Thomas (FL)	5

Championship
2	Vanguard (CA)	5	0
1	Oregon Tech	7	8^{(5)}

=== Lawrenceville Bracket ===
Hosted by Georgia Gwinnett College at Grizzly Softball Complex

First round
4	Missouri Baptist	3
5	Spring Arbor (MI)	4
First elimination round
4	Missouri Baptist	4
3	Southeastern (FL)	5^{(10)}

Second round
1	Eastern Oregon	8
5	Spring Arbor (MI)	3
2	Georgia Gwinnett	4
3	Southeastern (FL)	0
Second elimination round
5	Spring Arbor (MI)	0
3	Southeastern (FL)	4

Semifinals
1	Eastern Oregon	0
2	Georgia Gwinnett	2
Third elimination round
1	Eastern Oregon	3
3	Southeastern (FL)	2

Championship
2	Georgia Gwinnett	1	–
1	Eastern Oregon	0	–

=== Oklahoma City Bracket ===
Hosted by Oklahoma City University at Ann Lacy Stadium

First round
1	Oklahoma City (OK)	6
4	Ottawa (KS)	0
2	Houston–Victoria (TX)	4
3	Freed–Hardeman (TN)	0
First elimination round
4	Ottawa (KS)	2
3	Freed–Hardeman (TN)	1

Semifinal
1	Oklahoma City (OK)	5
2	Houston–Victoria (TX)	0
Second elimination round
2	Houston–Victoria (TX)	2
4	Ottawa (KS)	3

Championship
1	Oklahoma City (OK)	11^{(5)}	–
4	Ottawa (KS)	1	–

=== San Antonio Bracket ===
Hosted by Our Lady of the Lake University at St. Mary's University Softball Stadium

First round
1	Our Lady of the Lake (TX)	4
4	Cottey (MO)	0
2	Hope International (CA)	3
3	Evangel (MO)	0
First elimination round
4	Cottey (MO)	6
3	Evangel (MO)	5

Semifinal
1	Our Lady of the Lake (TX)	1
2	Hope International (CA)	0
Second elimination round
2	Hope International (CA)	9^{(5)}
4	Cottey (MO)	0

Championship
1	Our Lady of the Lake (TX)	2	–
2	Hope International (CA)	0	–

=== Sioux Center Bracket ===
Hosted by Northwestern College at Open Space Park

First round
4	Saint Xavier (IL)	4
5	Bellevue (NE)	3
First elimination round
5	Bellevue (NE)	2
3	Grand View (IA)	0

Second round
1	Northwestern (IA)	2
4	Saint Xavier (IL)	1
2	Madonna (MI)	6
3	Grand View (IA)	3
Second elimination round
4	Saint Xavier (IL)	4
5	Bellevue (NE)	6

Semifinals
1	Northwestern (IA)	3
2	Madonna (MI)	2
Third elimination round
2	Madonna (MI)	7
5	Bellevue (NE)	1

Championship
1	Northwestern (IA)	2	0
2	Madonna (MI)	8	1

=== Williamsburg Bracket ===
Hosted by the University of the Cumberlands at UC Softball Complex

First round
4	Tennessee Wesleyan	1
5	St. Francis (IL)	3
First elimination round
4	Tennessee Wesleyan	1
3	Coastal Georgia	7

Second round
1	Cumberlands (KY)	3
5	St. Francis (IL)	1
2	Benedictine (KS)	2
3	Coastal Georgia	1
Second elimination round
5	St. Francis (IL)	4
3	Coastal Georgia	5

Semifinals
1	Cumberlands (KY)	5
2	Benedictine (KS)	1
Third elimination round
2	Benedictine (KS)	1
3	Coastal Georgia	4

Championship
1	Cumberlands (KY)	7	–
3	Coastal Georgia	1	–

== NAIA Softball World Series ==
The NAIA Softball World Series was held at the South Commons Softball Complex in Columbus, Georgia from May 23 to 29.

=== Participants ===
School	Conference	Record	Head Coach	Bracket	Previous NAIA WS Appearances	Best NAIA WS Finish	NAIA WS Record
Central Methodist (MO)	Heart	52-5	Pat Reardon	Fayette	4 (last: 2023)	T-5th (2015)	4-8
Cumberlands (KY)	Mid-South	47-7	Bailey Dillender	Williamsburg	1 (last: 2023)	3rd (2023)	2-2
Georgia Gwinnett	Continental	32-15	Kat Ihlenburg	Lawrenceville	3 (last: 2023)	3rd (2019)	6-6
Jessup (CA)	Golden State	39-10	Brie Campbell	Hattiesburg	none	none	0-0
Madonna (MI)	Wolverine-Hoosier	52-4	Ron Pezzoni	Sioux Center	5 (last: 2021)	T-5th (2021)	7-8
Oklahoma City (OK)	Sooner	54-3	Phil McSpadden	Oklahoma City	33 (last: 2022)	1st (1994, 1995, 1996, 1997, 2000, 2001, 2002, 2007, 2016, 2017, 2022)	135-49
Oregon Tech	Cascade	47-10	Greg Stewart	Klamath Falls	8 (last: 2023)	1st (2011)	22-14
Our Lady of the Lake (TX)	Red River	53-3	Bruce Lenington	San Antonio	1 (last: 2023)	T-9th (2023)	0-2
Science & Arts (OK)	Sooner	47-7	Jadyn Wallis	Chickasha	7 (last: 2023)	1st (2018)	16-14
Southern Oregon	Cascade	40-17	Jessica Pistole	Indianapolis	5 (last: 2023)	1st (2019, 2021)	20-6

=== Bracket ===
First round Thursday, May 23	First round Thursday, May 23; Second round Friday, May 24	Third round Saturday, May 25	Semifinal; Tuesday, May 28	Championship; Wednesday, May 29
1	Our Lady of the Lake (TX)	3
8	Madonna (MI)	1	8	Madonna (MI)	0
1	Our Lady of the Lake (TX)	3
9	Georgia Gwinnett	0
5	Oregon Tech	0
4	Cumberlands (KY)	1
5	Oregon Tech	2
1	Our Lady of the Lake (TX)	4^{(8)}
6	Science & Arts (OK)	3
2	Oklahoma City (OK)	2
7	Jessup (CA)	5	7	Jessup (CA)	11^{(5)}
7	Jessup (CA)	4
10	Southern Oregon	4
6	Science & Arts (OK)	5
3	Central Methodist	3
6	Science & Arts (OK)	8	1	Our Lady of the Lake (TX)	2	–
7	Jessup (CA)	0	–
First round Friday, May 24; Losers eliminated	Second round Saturday, May 25; Losers eliminated	Third round Monday, May 27 & Tuesday, May 28; Losers eliminated	Fourth round Tuesday, May 28; Loser eliminated	Semifinal; Wednesday, May 29
5	Oregon Tech	4
2	Oklahoma City (OK)	1	4	Cumberlands (KY)	2	6	Science & Arts (OK)	2
9	Georgia Gwinnett	0	4	Cumberlands (KY)	4	5	Oregon Tech	3	7	Jessup (CA)	3
4	Cumberlands (KY)	1^{(8)}	7	Jessup (CA)	4
7	Jessup (CA)	4
8	Madonna (MI)	4	8	Madonna (MI)	3
10	Southern Oregon	3	10	Southern Oregon	3
3	Central Methodist	2

=== Game results ===
Date	Game	Winning team	Score	Losing team	Winning pitcher	Losing pitcher	Save	Notes
May 23	Game 1	Jessup	5-4	Southern Oregon	Katie Blankenheim (16–5)	Katie Machado (25–6)	-	-
May 23	Game 2	Madonna	1-0	Georgia Gwinnett	Maeson Schlaud (36–3)	Annalise Jarvis (19–6)	-	-
May 23	Game 3	Oregon Tech	2-1	Cumberlands	Kacie Schmidt (26–7)	Lindsey Shope (17–3)	-	-
May 23	Game 4	Science & Arts	8-3	Central Methodist	Sophie Williams (28–4)	Jordan Ball (27–2)	-	-
May 24	Game 5	Cumberlands	1-0 (8 inn.)	Georgia Gwinnett	Talli Burgess (15–0)	Annalise Jarvis (19–7)	-	Georgia Gwinnett eliminated
May 24	Game 6	Southern Oregon	3-2	Central Methodist	Katie Machado (26–6)	Haile Farris (19–3)	-	Central Methodist eliminated
May 24	Game 7	Jessup	11-2 (5 inn.)	Oklahoma City	Bella MacFarlane (5–1)	Shelby Cornelson (23–4)	-	-
May 24	Game 8	Our Lady of the Lake	3-0	Madonna	Cassandra Valdez (27–1)	Maeson Schlaud (36–4)	-	-
May 25	Game 9	Cumberlands	4-1	Oklahoma City	Talli Burgess (16–0)	Shelby Cornelson (23–5)	-	Oklahoma City eliminated
May 25	Game 10	Madonna	4-3	Southern Oregon	Maeson Schlaud (37–4)	Katie Machado (26–7)	-	Southern Oregon eliminated
May 25	Game 11	Our Lady of the Lake	3-0	Oregon Tech	Cassandra Valdez (28–1)	Kacie Schmidt (26–8)	-	-
May 25	Game 12	Science & Arts	5-4	Jessup	Sophie Williams (29–4)	Terra Goetz (14–3)	-	-
May 27	Game 13	Oregon Tech	4-2	Cumberlands	Kacie Schmidt (27–8)	Talli Burgess (16–1)	Mackenzie Staub (2)	Cumberlands eliminated; game delayed & completed on May 28
May 28	Game 14	Jessup	4-3	Madonna	Katie Blankenheim (17–5)	Maeson Schlaud (37–5)	-	Madonna eliminated
May 28	Game 15	Our Lady of the Lake	4-3 (8 inn.)	Science & Arts	Cassandra Valdez (29–1)	Sophie Williams (29–5)	-	-
May 28	Game 16	Jessup	4-3	Oregon Tech	Bella MacFarlane (5–1)	Kacie Schmit (27–9)	-	Oregon Tech eliminated
May 29	Game 17	Jessup	3-2	Science & Arts	Katie Blankenheim (18–5)	Sophie Williams (29–6)	-	Science & Arts eliminated
May 29	Game 18	Our Lady of the Lake	2-0	Jessup	Cassandra Valdez (30–1)	Terra Goetz (14–4)	-	Our Lady of the Lake wins NAIA Softball World Series

=== Championship game ===
May 29, 2024 - 5:00 PM EDT at South Commons Softball Complex in Columbus, Georgia
Team	1	2	3	4	5	6	7	R	H	E
Jessup	0	0	0	0	0	0	0	0	4	0
Our Lady of the Lake	0	0	1	0	0	1	X	2	6	0
WP: Cassandra Valdez (30-1) LP: Terra Goetz (14-4); Home runs: JESSUP: None; OLLU: Madison Garza; Attendance: N/A Time: 1:53; Umpires: HP: Scott Helmka, 1B: Terry Hall, 2B: Phil Troutman, 3B: Kristina Bates; Boxscore

=== All-Tournament Team ===
Position	Player	School
P	Talli Burgess	Cumberlands
P	Annalise Jarvis	Georgia Gwinnett
P	Maeson Schlaud	Madonna
P	Kacie Schmidt	Oregon Tech
P	Sophie Williams	Science & Arts
P/UTL	Cassandra Valdez (MVP)	Our Lady of the Lake
1B	Puakea Milbourne	Oregon Tech
INF	Sarah Giles	Jessup
INF	Malea McMurtrey	Science & Arts
INF/OF	Hailey Seva	Southern Oregon
OF	Kayla Dreese	Our Lady of the Lake
OF	Amber Gainer	Cumberlands
OF	Alyssa Gauthier	Madonna
OF	Macenzie Ruth	Science & Arts
UTL	Sam Lorge	Jessup
UTL	Maddy Ybarra	Jessup

== Media coverage ==
=== Live-streaming ===
The Opening Round live streams were produced by the host schools. World Series games from May 23–28 were streamed on the NAIA Network with play-by-play by Jack Kreuzer.

=== Television ===
The semifinals and national championship were broadcast on ESPN3, with Kreuzer providing play-by-play and Columbus State University softball coach Brad Huskisson serving as the analyst.
