= 2023 NAIA softball tournament =

42nd NAIA softball championship

- Teams: 40
- Format: double-elimination
- Finals site: South Commons Softball Complex Columbus, GA
- Champions: Southern Oregon (3rd title)
- Runner-up: Oregon Tech
- Winning coach: Jessica Pistole
- MVP: Cayla Williams (Southern Oregon)
- Television: NAIA Network, ESPN3

The 2023 NAIA softball tournament was the 42nd edition of the NAIA softball championship.The 40-team tournament began on May 15 with Opening Round games at ten different sites and concluded with the 2023 NAIA Softball World Series in Columbus, Georgia on May 25-31.

Southern Oregon won its third NAIA title, defeating Oregon Tech 11-0 in five innings. Cayla Williams of Southern Oregon was named tournament MVP.

== Format ==
A total of 40 teams entered the tournament, with 32 receiving an automatic bid by either winning their conference's tournament, finishing as their conference tournament runner-up, or by finishing in first place in their conference. The remaining 8 bids were issued at large, with selections extended by the NAIA Selection Committee.

== Bids ==
Conferences with 10 or more members received two automatic berths, while conferences with less than 10 received one. All conferences awarded a bid to their tournament champion.

=== Automatic ===
School	Conference	Record	Qualifying Method	Last NAIA Appearance
Avila (MO)	Kansas	34–19	Tournament champion	2019
Campellsville (KY)	Mid-South	31–15–2	Tournament runner-up	2022
Central Methodist (MO)	Heart	38–10	Regular season champion	2022
Coastal Georgia	The Sun	40–10	Tournament champion	2022
College of Idaho	Cascade	46–8	Tournament runner-up	2022
Columbia (MO)	American Midwest	24–17	Tournament champion	2022
Cottey (MO)	American Midwest	34–19	Regular season champion	2022
Cumberlands (KY)	Mid-South	44–3–1	Tournament champion	2017
Embry–Riddle (AZ)	Cal-Pac	37–14	Tournament champion	2022
Georgia Gwinnett	Continental	40–10	Tournament champion	2022
IU Southeast	River States	33–17	Regular season champion	2021
Indiana Tech	Wolverine-Hoosier	40–10	Regular season champion	First appearance
Madonna (MI)	Wolverine–Hoosier	36–12	Tournament champion	2022
Marian (IN)	Crossroads	45–6	Regular season champion	2022
Middle Georgia State	Southern States	46–12	Tournament champion	First appearance
Midland (NE)	Great Plains	36–12	Tournament champion	2022
Mount Mercy (IA)	Heart	32–18	Tournament runner-up	2021
Northwestern (IA)	Great Plains	46–8	Regular season champion	2018
Oregon Tech	Cascade	47–7	Regular season champion	2022
Ottawa (KS)	Kansas	41–9	Regular season champion	2022
Our Lady of the Lake (TX)	Red River	47–5	Regular season champion	2022
Reinhardt (GA)	Appalachian	35–11	Regular season champion	2021
St. Mary-of-the-Woods (IN)	River States	36–14	Tournament champion	2022
Saint Xavier (IL)	Chicagoland	34–12	Tournament champion	2022
Science & Arts (OK)	Sooner	39–13	Tournament champion	2022
St. Francis (IL)	Chicagoland	32–9	Regular season champion	2018
Taylor (IN)	Crossroads	26–30	Tournament runner-up	2022
Tennessee Wesleyan	Appalachian	27–15	Tournament champion	2022
Texas A&M–San Antonio	Red River	30–21	Tournament runner-up	First appearance
USC–Beaufort	Continental	14–43	Tournament runner-up	2019
Valley City State (ND)	North Star	28–21	Tournament champion	2022
Vanguard (CA)	Golden State	26–28	Tournament champion	2019

=== At–Large ===
School	Conference	Record	Last Opening Round Appearance
Baker (KS)	Heart	44–9	2019
Freed–Hardeman (TN)	Mid-South	25–13	2022
Hope International (CA)	Golden State	39–14	2021
Indiana Wesleyan	Crossroads	40–13	2022
Mobile (AL)	Southern States	38–13	2022
Oklahoma City (OK)	Sooner	45–9	2022
Southeastern (FL)	The Sun	33–16	2022
Southern Oregon	Cascade	42–11	2022

=== By conference ===
Conference	Total	Schools
Cascade	3	College of Idaho, Oregon Tech, Southern Oregon
Crossroads	3	Indiana Wesleyan, Marian (IN), Taylor (IN)
Heart	3	Baker (KS), Central Methodist (MO), Mount Mercy (IA)
Mid-South	3	Campellsville (KY), Cumberlands (KY), Freed–Hardeman (TN)
American Midwest	2	Columbia (MO), Cottey (MO)
Appalachian	2	Reinhardt (GA), Tennessee Wesleyan
Chicagoland	2	Saint Xavier (IL), St. Francis (IL)
Continental	2	Georgia Gwinnett, USC–Beaufort
Golden State	2	Hope International (CA), Vanguard (CA)
Great Plains	2	Midland (NE), Northwestern (IA)
Kansas	2	Avila (MO), Ottawa (KS)
Red River	2	Our Lady of the Lake (TX), Texas A&M–San Antonio
River States	2	IU Southeast, St. Mary-of-the-Woods (IN)
Sooner	2	Oklahoma City (OK), Science & Arts (OK)
SSAC	2	Middle Georgia State, Mobile (AL)
The Sun	2	Coastal Georgia, Southeastern (FL)
Wolverine-Hoosier	2	Indiana Tech, Madonna (MI)
Cal-Pac	1	Embry–Riddle (AZ)
North Star	1	Valley City State (ND)

== Opening Round ==
The Opening Round brackets were held May 15-17.

=== Ashland Bracket ===
Hosted by Southern Oregon University at University Field

First Round
1	Southern Oregon	4
4	Vanguard (CA)	8
2	Southeastern (FL)	4
3	Reinhardt (GA)	6
First Elimination Round
1	Southern Oregon	2
2	Southeastern (FL)	0

Semifinal
4	Vanguard (CA)	0
3	Reinhardt (GA)	1^{(8)}
Second Elimination Round
1	Southern Oregon	10
4	Vanguard (CA)	4

Championship
3	Reinhardt (GA)	4	0
1	Southern Oregon	8	11^{(5)}

=== Baldwin City Bracket ===
Hosted by Baker University at Cavaness Field

First Round
1	College of Idaho	4
4	Valley City State (ND)	1
2	Baker (KS)	3
3	IU Southeast	0
First Elimination Round
4	Valley City State (ND)	9
3	IU Southeast	12

Semifinal
1	College of Idaho	1
2	Baker (KS)	5
Second Elimination Round
1	College of Idaho	8
3	IU Southeast	2

Championship
2	Baker (KS)	2	5
1	College of Idaho	4	3

=== Chickasha Bracket ===
Hosted by University of Science and Arts of Oklahoma at Bill Smith Ballpark

First Round
1	Science & Arts (OK)	4
4	Avila (MO)	0
2	Mobile (AL)	2
3	Cottey (MO)	0
First Elimination Round
4	Avila (MO)	4
3	Cottey (MO)	0

Semifinal
1	Science & Arts (OK)	3^{(9)}
2	Mobile (AL)	2
Second Elimination Round
2	Mobile (AL)	6
4	Avila (MO)	2

Championship
1	Science & Arts (OK)	1	–
2	Mobile (AL)	0	–

=== Henderson Bracket ===
Hosted by Freed-Hardeman University at Tucker Field

First Round
1	Central Methodist (MO)	2
4	St. Francis (IL)	1
2	Ottawa (KS)	4
3	Freed–Hardeman (TN)	5
First Elimination Round
4	St. Francis (IL)	1
2	Ottawa (KS)	4

Semifinal
1	Central Methodist (MO)	9^{(6)}
3	Freed–Hardeman (TN)	1
Second Elimination Round
3	Freed–Hardeman (TN)	2
2	Ottawa (KS)	0

Championship
1	Central Methodist (MO)	6^{(10)}	–
3	Freed–Hardeman (TN)	4	–

=== Indianapolis Bracket ===
Hosted by Marian University at Marian Softball Diamond

First Round
1	Marian (IN)	3
4	Tennessee Wesleyan	0
2	Middle Georgia State	0
3	Columbia (MO)	5
First Elimination Round
4	Tennessee Wesleyan	0
2	Middle Georgia State	5

Semifinal
1	Marian (IN)	2
3	Columbia (MO)	4
Second Elimination Round
1	Marian (IN)	5
2	Middle Georgia State	0

Championship
3	Columbia (MO)	0	1
1	Marian (IN)	1	8

=== Klamath Falls Bracket ===
Hosted by Oregon Tech at Stilwell Stadium

First Round
1	Oregon Tech	4
4	Saint Xavier (IL)	3
2	Northwestern (IA)	6
3	Embry–Riddle (AZ)	5
First Elimination Round
4	Saint Xavier (IL)	6
3	Embry–Riddle (AZ)	5

Semifinal
1	Oregon Tech	10^{(6)}
2	Northwestern (IA)	2
Second Elimination Round
2	Northwestern (IA)	2
4	Saint Xavier (IL)	10^{(6)}

Championship
1	Oregon Tech	0	5
4	Saint Xavier (IL)	3	2

=== Lawrenceville Bracket ===
Hosted by Georgia Gwinnett College at Grizzly Softball Complex

First Round
1	Georgia Gwinnett	4
4	St. Mary-of-the-Woods (IN)	1
2	Coastal Georgia	1
3	Indiana Tech	2^{(8)}
First Elimination Round
4	St. Mary-of-the-Woods (IN)	4
2	Coastal Georgia	8

Semifinal
1	Georgia Gwinnett	7
3	Indiana Tech	1
Second Elimination Round
3	Indiana Tech	0
2	Coastal Georgia	3

Championship
1	Georgia Gwinnett	6^{(11)}	–
2	Coastal Georgia	5	–

=== Oklahoma City Bracket ===
Hosted by Oklahoma City University at Yukon High School in Yukon, OK and Ann Lacy Stadium (Note: The May 15 games (Games 1 and 2) in the Oklahoma City Bracket were played at Yukon High School in Yukon, OK due to heavy rains that made Ann Lacy Stadium unplayable. The remainder of the tournament was then played at Ann Lacy Stadium.)

First Round
1	Oklahoma City (OK)	11^{(5)}
4	Texas A&M–San Antonio	2
2	Midland (NE)	2^{(9)}
3	Mount Mercy (IA)	1
First Elimination Round
4	Texas A&M–San Antonio	0
3	Mount Mercy (IA)	1^{(12)}

Semifinal
1	Oklahoma City (OK)	1
2	Midland (NE)	2
Second Elimination Round
1	Oklahoma City (OK)	5
3	Mount Mercy (IA)	2

Championship
2	Midland (NE)	1	2
1	Oklahoma City (OK)	3	1

=== San Antonio Bracket ===
Hosted by Our Lady of the Lake University at St. Mary's University Softball Stadium

First Round
1	Our Lady of the Lake (TX)	9
4	Taylor (IN)	1
2	Hope International (CA)	1
3	Campellsville (KY)	0
First Elimination Round
4	Taylor (IN)	6
3	Campellsville (KY)	2

Semifinal
1	Our Lady of the Lake (TX)	0
2	Hope International (CA)	1
Second Elimination Round
1	Our Lady of the Lake (TX)	10
4	Taylor (IN)	3

Championship
2	Hope International (CA)	0	0
1	Our Lady of the Lake (TX)	2	2

=== Williamsburg Bracket ===
Hosted by the University of the Cumberlands at UC Softball Complex

First Round
1	Cumberlands (KY)	3^{(8)}
4	USC–Beaufort	2
2	Indiana Wesleyan	0
3	Madonna (MI)	2
First Elimination Round
4	USC–Beaufort	8
2	Indiana Wesleyan	4

Semifinal
1	Cumberlands (KY)	4
3	Madonna (MI)	2
Second Elimination Round
3	Madonna (MI)	11^{(5)}
4	USC–Beaufort	1

Championship
1	Cumberlands (KY)	4^{(10)}	–
3	Madonna (MI)	1	–

== NAIA Softball World Series ==
The 42nd annual NAIA Softball World Series was held May 25-31 at the South Commons Softball Complex in Columbus, Georgia.

=== Participants ===
School	Conference	Record (conference)	Head Coach	World Series Appearances (including 2023)	World Series Record (excluding 2023)
Baker	Heart	47-10 (21-5)	Dana Goss	1 (2023)	0-0
Central Methodist	Heart	41-10 (21-5)	Pat Reardon	4 (2023, 2015, 2012, 1981)	3-6
Cumberlands	Mid-South	47-3-1 (21-0)	Bailey Dillender	1 (2023)	0-0
Georgia Gwinnett	Continental	43-10 (7-1)	Kat Ihlenburg	3 (2023, 2019, 2018)	4-4
Marian	Crossroads League	49-7 (31-5)	Scott Flemming	6 (2023, 2019, 2018, 2017, 2016, 2003)	3-10
Midland	GPAC	39-13 (16-6)	Beth Singleton	4 (2023, 2011, 2010, 2003)	2-7
Oregon Tech	Cascade	50-8 (29-1)	Greg Stewart	8 (2023, 2022, 2021, 2019, 2015, 2012, 2011, 1997)	18-12
Our Lady of the Lake	Red River	51-6 (28-0)	Bruce Lenington	1 (2023)	0-0
Science & Arts	Sooner	42-13 (25-7)	Jaydn Wallis	7 (2023, 2022, 2019, 2018, 2006, 2005, 2004)	16-12
Southern Oregon	Cascade	46-12 (25-5)	Jessica Pistole	5 (2023, 2021, 2019 2018, 2017)	16-6

=== Bracket ===
First Round	First/Second Round	Quarterfinals	Semifinals	Championship
1	Oregon Tech	4
8	Central Methodist (MO)	2	8	Central Methodist (MO)	1
1	Oregon Tech	0
9	Baker (KS)	0
4	Southern Oregon	10^{(6)}
4	Southern Oregon	5
5	Georgia Gwinnett	1
4	Southern Oregon	9^{(5)}
3	Cumberlands (KY)	1
2	Our Lady of the Lake (TX)	3
7	Marian (IN)	2	7	Marian (IN)	6
7	Marian (IN)	6
10	Midland (NE)	0
3	Cumberlands (KY)	9
3	Cumberlands (KY)	2
6	Science & Arts (OK)	1	4	Southern Oregon	11^{(5)}	–
1	Oregon Tech	0	–
First Round	Second Round	Quarterfinals	Semifinals	Semifinals
7	Marian (IN)	6
8	Central Methodist (MO)	7	5	Georgia Gwinnett	0	3	Cumberlands (KY)	0
9	Baker (KS)	2	5	Georgia Gwinnett	9	7	Marian (IN)	5	1	Oregon Tech	3
5	Georgia Gwinnett	6	1	Oregon Tech	8
1	Oregon Tech	6
2	Our Lady of the Lake (TX)	5	10	Midland (NE)	0
10	Midland (NE)	3^{(11)}	10	Midland (NE)	6
6	Science & Arts (OK)	2

=== Game results ===
Date	Game	Winning team	Score	Losing team	Winning pitcher	Losing pitcher	Save	Notes
May 25	Game 1	Marian	2-0	Midland	Sydney Wilson (23-3)	Aliyah Rincon (23-7)	-	-
May 25	Game 2	Central Methodist	2-0 (8 inn.)	Baker	Jordyn Ball (19-3)	Kira Baker (24-2)	-	-
May 25	Game 3	Southern Oregon	5-1	Georgia Gwinnett	Cayla Williams (21-5)	Annalise Wood (23-3)	-	-
May 25	Game 4	Cumberlands	2-1	Science & Arts	Talli Burgess (20-0)	Sophie Williams (24-7)	-	-
May 26	Game 5	Georgia Gwinnett	6-2	Baker	Kailyn Berry (9-4)	Kira Baker 924-3)	-	Baker eliminated
May 26	Game 6	Midland	3-2 (11 inn.)	Science & Arts	Aliyah Rincon (24-7)	Sophie Williams (24-8)	-	Science & Arts eliminated
May 26	Game 7	Oregon Tech	4-1	Central Methodist	Kacie Schmidt (27-1)	Haley Cotter (7-1)	-	-
May 26	Game 8	Marian	6-3	Our Lady of the Lake	Olivia Stunkel (25-3)	Cassandra Valdez (28-5)	Sydney Wilson (2)	-
May 27	Game 9	Georgia Gwinnett	9-7	Central Methodist	Alexa Good (12-4)	Haley Cotter (7-2)	Annalise Wood (4)	Central Methodist eliminated
May 27	Game 10	Midland	6-5	Our Lady of the Lake	Aliyah Rincon (25-7)	Angela Ramirez (17-2)	-	Our Lady of the Lake eliminated
May 27	Game 11	Southern Oregon	10-0 (6 inn.)	Oregon Tech	Cayla Williams (22-5)	McKenzie Staub (23-7)	-	-
May 27	Game 12	Cumberlands	9-6	Marian	Talli Burgess (21-0)	Olivia Stunkel (25-4)	Morgan Radford (1)	-
May 29	Game 13	Marian	6-0	Georgia Gwinnett	Sydney Wilson (24-3)	Kailyn Berry (9-5)	-	Georgia Gwinnett eliminated
May 29	Game 14	Oregon Tech	6-0	Midland	Kacie Schmidt (28-1)	Aliyah Rincon (25-8)	-	Midland eliminated
May 29	Game 15	Southern Oregon	9-1 (5 inn.)	Cumberlands	Cayla Williams (23-5)	Talli Burgess (21-1)	-	-
May 30	Game 16	Oregon Tech	8-5	Marian	McKenzie Staub (24-7)	Olivia Stunkel (25-6)	-	Marian eliminated
May 30	Game 17	Oregon Tech	3-0	Cumberlands	Kacie Schmidt (29-1)	Morgan Radford (15-2)	-	Cumberlands eliminated
May 31	Game 18	Southern Oregon	11-0 (5 inn.)	Oregon Tech	Cayla Williams (24-5)	Kacie Schmidt (29-2)	-	Southern Oregon wins NAIA Softball World Series

=== Championship game ===
May 31, 2023 - 5:00 p.m. EDT at South Commons Softball Complex in Columbus, Georgia
Team	1	2	3	4	5	R	H	E
Southern Oregon	5	0	0	0	6	11	13	1
Oregon Tech	0	0	0	0	0	0	5	4
WP: Cayla Williams (24-5) LP: Kacie Schmidt (29-7); Home runs: SOU: Ashton Cathey, Riley Donovan; OIT: None; Attendance: N/A Time: 1:43; Umpires: HP: Terry Hall, 1B: Antonio Flores, 2B: Brian Soule, 3B: Eric Salgado; Notes: Game ended after 5 innings due to 8-run rule Boxscore

=== All-Tournament Team ===
Position	Player	School
P	Morgan Radford	Cumberlands
P	Aliyah Rincon	Midland
P	Sydney Wilson	Marian
P/1B	Cayla Williams (MVP)	Southern Oregon
2B	Deja Acosta	Southern Oregon
2B	Carly Oliver	Cumberlands
SS	Savannah Harweger	Marian
SS	Kaila Mick	Oregon Tech
SS	Madison White	Central Methodist
INF	Lindzie Owen	Georgia Gwinnett
OF	Maggie Buckholz	Oregon Tech
OF	Makenzie Keatts	Cumberlands
OF	Sarah Kerling	Southern Oregon
OF	Abby Madere	Marian
C	Riley Donovan	Southern Oregon

== Media coverage ==
=== Live-streaming ===
The Opening Round live streams were produced by the host schools. World Series games from May 25-29 were streamed on the NAIA Network with play-by-play by Jack Kreuzer.

=== Television ===
The semifinals and national championship were broadcast on ESPN3, with Kreuzer providing play-by-play. Columbus State University softball coach Brad Huskisson served as the analyst.
