= Nora Chapa Mendoza =

American painter (born 1932)

- Born: 1932 (age 93–94); Weslaco, Texas
- Known for: abstract painting

Nora Chapa Mendoza (born 1932) is a Texas-born artist. She has been named Michigan Artist of the Year and in 1999 she received the Governor's Arts Award. In 1996, she was one of eight artists that participated in the renovation of Detroit's Music Hall.

== Biography ==
=== Life and education ===
She was born in Weslaco, Texas to Mexican parents. She studied at the Center for Creative Studies in Detroit and Madonna University in Livonia, Michigan.

== Art work ==
She has become well known for the forms hidden within her abstract paintings. Her paintings often draw on themes of immigration and deterritorialization, human rights, labor, rebellion and are informed by her Mexican heritage and her experiences as an artist in Detroit. She has done work including restoration, workshops, artist in residence, and murals.

=== Arts Organizations ===
Throughout her life, Mendoza worked to create an environment where differences were valued, and where future generations would not experience the discrimination she experienced in her own life. In 1978, Mendoza, along with a group of Latino artists formed Nuestras Artes de Michigan (NAM), with chapters established in Ann Arbor, Detroit and Lansing. She was also a founding member of the Michigan Hispanic Cultural/Art Association (MHCC). In 1999, Mendoza acted as the official liaison to the Michigan Latino Arts and Culture Initiative, a collaboration of Casa de Unidad, the Michigan Council for the Arts, and the Michigan Department of Education.

== Awards and recognition ==
In 1981, she opened Galeria Mendoza in Detroit, which became the "first legitimate Latin American art gallery ever established in Detroit."

She has exhibited nationally and internationally, and her work is represented in collections around the world. Her collectors include Detroit's former Mayor Dennis Archer, singer Aretha Franklin, actor Edward James Olmos, and the former president of General Motors Mr. Jack Smith. Corporate collectors include the Ford offices in Rockefeller Plaza (New York, New York), Edison Plaza (Detroit, Michigan), General Motors offices (Detroit, Michigan), and Blue Cross/Blue Shield of Michigan (Detroit, Michigan).

She was named the Visual Artist of 2011 by the Wayne County Council for Arts, History & Humanities.
