= Texas A&M–Victoria Jaguars =

American collage athletic teams in Texas

A&M–Victoria Jaguars
- University: University of Houston–Victoria (2007–2025); Texas A&M University–Victoria (2025–present)
- Conference: RRAC (primary)
- NAIA: Division I
- Athletic director: Ashley Walyuchow
- Location: Victoria, Texas
- Varsity teams: 6
- Baseball stadium: Riverside Stadium
- Soccer stadium: The Cage
- Mascot: 'JAX'
- Nickname: Jaguars
- Website: tamuvathletics.com

The Texas A&M–Victoria Jaguars (also known as Jaguars, Jags, or A&M–Victoria Jaguars, formerly UHV Jaguars) are the athletic teams that represent Texas A&M University–Victoria (TAMUV) in intercollegiate sports as a member of the National Association of Intercollegiate Athletics (NAIA), primarily competing in the Red River Athletic Conference (RRAC) since the 2015–16 academic year. The Jaguars previously competed as an NAIA Independent within the Association of Independent Institutions (AII) from the school's athletic program's inception in 2007–08 until 2014–15.

TAMUV is one of eleven Texas A&M University System member schools with a varsity athletic program. The university and its athletic program assumed their current identities on September 1, 2025, when the former University of Houston–Victoria transferred from the UH System to the Texas A&M University System and became Texas A&M University–Victoria.

== Varsity teams ==
A&M–Victoria competes in six intercollegiate sports: Men's sports include baseball, golf and soccer; while women's sports include golf, soccer and softball. It began its intercollegiate athletic program with baseball and softball in 2007–08, followed by men's & women's golf and men's & women's soccer in 2010–11.

In 2025, under its current name, it unveiled an updated jaguar and wordmark.

== Mascot ==
The nickname "Jaguar" originates from input by students, staff, faculty, and the local community.

== Athletic director ==
Ashley Walyuchow has served as director of athletics since the program's inception in 2006.

== Baseball ==
The Jaguars baseball team finished their first season nationally ranked as No. 31 by the NAIA with a 29–5 record. The Jaguars baseball team plays their home games at Riverside Stadium in Victoria, Texas. The Jaguars baseball head coach Terry Puhl is a former outfielder for the Houston Astros and Kansas City Royals. Puhl is also a Canadian Baseball Hall of Fame and Texas Baseball Hall of Fame inductee, and manager for the Canada national baseball team. During the team's first season, former Astros manager and one of Puhl's teammates as a player for the club, Phil Garner became interim coach for the team as Puhl's obligation to the Canada national baseball team forced him to temporarily leave his position. Puhl eventually returned as coach.

In the final 2009 NAIA Baseball Coaches’ Poll, UHV was ranked No. 35. The Jaguars captured their first Association of Independent Institutions (AII) conference championship and earned a berth to the NAIA National Championships opening round in Lubbock.

In 2010, The Jaguars won the AII conference championship again and advance to the opening round of the national championships coming up one win short of advancing to the NAIA World Series in Lewiston, Idaho. In 2011, the Jaguars were runner-up at the conference tournament in Thomasville, Georgia.

== Softball ==
The Jaguars softball team finished their first regular season nationally ranked as No. 15 by the NAIA, and received the No. 4 seed to the Region VI tournament. The Jaguars' regular season record was 30–16. The Jaguars softball team plays their home games at Burdge Field in the O'Connor Athletic Complex located in Victoria, Texas. The Jaguars are coached by Lindsey Ortiz.

The Jaguars won the AII conference championship and advanced to the NAIA National Championships in Decatur, Alabama but did not advance out of pool play. The Jaguars finished the 2009 season ranked No. 18 by the NAIA.

The Jaguars did not win the conference championship in 2010 or 2011.

== Other sports ==
In November 2008, UHV announced that two more sports would be added to the athletics department. Men's and women's golf and soccer programs began in the 2010–11 season.

== See also ==
- Cultural significance of the jaguar in North America
