= LSU–Alexandria Generals =

- University: Louisiana State University of Alexandria
- Conference: RRAC (primary)
- NAIA: Division I
- Athletic director: Tyler Unsicker
- Location: Alexandria, Louisiana
- Varsity teams: 7
- Basketball arena: LSUA Fitness Center
- Baseball stadium: Generals Baseball Field
- Softball stadium: Generals Softball Field
- Soccer stadium: Generals Soccer Field
- Other venues: LSUA Tennis Courts
- Nickname: Generals
- Colors: Purple and gold
- Website: lsuagenerals.com

The LSU–Alexandria Generals (or LSUA Generals) are the athletic teams that represent Louisiana State University of Alexandria, located in Alexandria, Louisiana, in intercollegiate sports as a member of the National Association of Intercollegiate Athletics (NAIA), primarily competing in the Red River Athletic Conference (RRAC) since the 2014–15 academic year. The Generals previously competed as an NAIA independent within the Association of Independent Institutions (AII) from 2007–08 to 2013–14.

== Varsity teams ==
LSUA competes in seven intercollegiate varsity sports. Men's sports include baseball, basketball and soccer; while women's sports include basketball, soccer, softball and tennis. Club sports include cheerleading and rodeo.

Men's sports	Women's sports
Baseball	Basketball
Basketball	Soccer
Soccer	Softball
	Tennis

=== Baseball ===
The baseball team represents Louisiana State University of Alexandria. The school's team currently competes in the Red River Athletic Conference, which is part of the National Association of Intercollegiate Athletics. The team plays home games at the Generals Baseball Field.

LSU–Alexandria has had 2 Major League Baseball draft selection since the draft began in 1965.

Year	Player	Round	Team
1981	Ronald Robbins	30	Dodgers
2018	Brian Metoyer	40	Mets

=== Men's basketball ===
The men's basketball team represents Louisiana State University of Alexandria. The school's team currently competes in the RRAC, which is part of the NAIA. The team plays home games at the LSUA Fitness Center.

=== Women's basketball ===
The school's team currently competes in the RRAC, which is part of the NAIA. The team plays home games at the LSUA Fitness Center.
