= Crossroads League =

College athletics body in the U.S. Midwest

- Formerly: Mid-Central College Conference (1959–2012)
- Association: NAIA
- Founded: 1959; 67 years ago
- Commissioner: Larry DeSimpelare
- Sports fielded: 15; men's: 7; women's: 8
- No. of teams: 10 (11 in 2027)
- Region: Midwestern United States; Region VIII
- Website: crossroadsleague.com

Locations
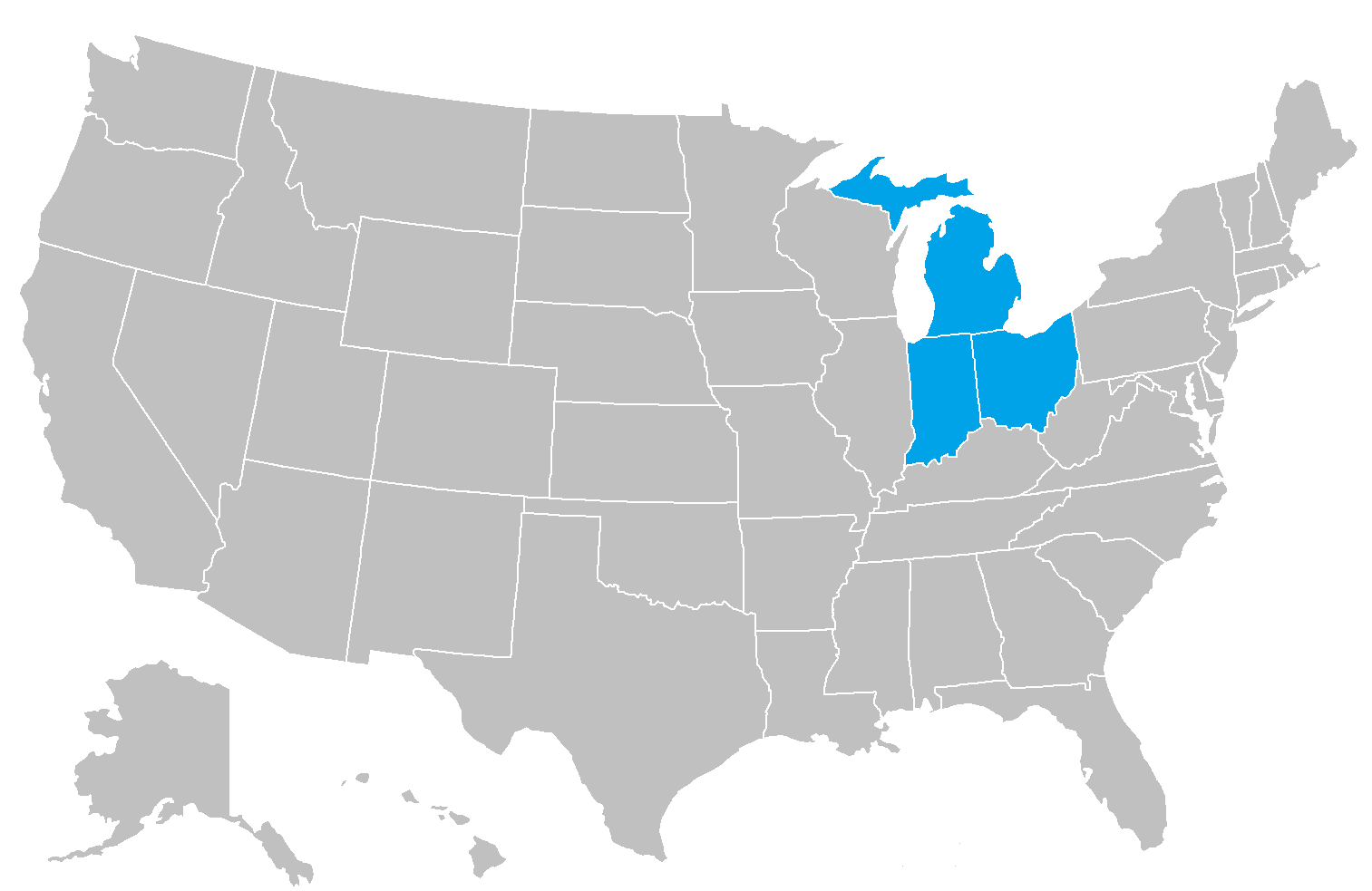

The Crossroads League (formerly the Mid-Central College Conference) is a college athletic conference affiliated with the National Association of Intercollegiate Athletics (NAIA). Its members are private Christian colleges in Indiana, Michigan, and Ohio. The current conference commissioner is Larry DeSimpelare.

== History ==
Crossroads League
Location of Crossroads members: current, future

In June 2012, the conference voted to change its name to the Crossroads League, a name to better reflect the conference having grown beyond its Central Indiana roots.

=== Chronological timeline ===
- 1959 – On June 1, 1959, the Crossroad League was founded as the Mid-Central College Conference (MCCC). Charter members included Concordia Senior College, Grace College (now Grace College & Seminary), Huntington College, Indiana Institute of Technology (Indiana Tech) and Tri-State College (now Trine University), beginning the 1959–60 academic year.
- 1963 – On September 17, 1963, the MCCC joined the National Association of Intercollegiate Athletics (NAIA) as a sponsored athletic conference, beginning the 1963–64 academic year.
- 1966 – Saint Francis College (now the University of Saint Francis of Indiana) joined the MCCC in the 1966–67 academic year.
- 1969 – On Nov. 6, 1969, Goshen College joined the MCCC, beginning the 1970–71 academic year.
- 1972 – Concordia Senior College left the MCCC after the 1971–72 academic year.
- 1973 – Marion College (now Indiana Wesleyan University) joined the MCCC in the 1973–74 academic year.
- 1978 – Indiana Tech left the MCCC after the 1977–78 academic year.
- 1979 – Grace left the MCCC after the 1978–79 academic year.
- 1980 – Tri-State announced that it would leave the MCCC on May 8, and Saint Francis (Ind.) announced the same on May 12, both effective after the 1980–81 academic year.
- 1980 – On November 5, 1980, Bethel College (now Bethel University) joined the MCCC, with Grace re-joining as well, both effective beginning the 1981–82 academic year.
- 1986 – Bethel initially withdrew from the MCCC after the 1985–86 academic year. However, on August 25, 1986, Bethel was reinstated into the conference for the 1986–87 academic year.
- 1986 – Women's sports were introduced in the MCCC, beginning the 1986–87 academic year.
- 1987 – On September 14, 1987, Marian College (now Marian University) joined the MCCC in the 1987–88 academic year.
- 1994 – Taylor University joined the MCCC, with Saint Francis (Ind.) re-joining, both effective beginning the 1994–95 academic year.
- 2004 – Spring Arbor University joined the MCCC in the 2004–05 academic year.
- 2010 – On November 30, 2010, Mount Vernon Nazarene University joined the MCCC in the 2010–11 academic year.
- 2012 – On June 27, 2012, the MCCC was rebranded as the Crossroads League, beginning the 2012–13 academic year.
- 2027 – Manchester University will join the Crossroads, beginning the 2027–28 academic year.

== Member schools ==
=== Current members ===
The Crossroads League currently has ten full members; all are private, Christian schools:

Institution	Location	Founded	Affiliation	Enrollment	Nickname	Joined (Note: Represents the calendar year when fall sports competition begins.)
Bethel University	Mishawaka, Indiana	1947	Missionary	1,167	Pilots	1981
Goshen College	Goshen, Indiana	1894	Mennonite	847	Maple Leafs	1970
Grace College & Seminary	Winona Lake, Indiana	1948	Charis Fellowship	2,304	Lancers	1959; 1981 (Note: Grace left the Crossroads after the 1978–79 school year and rejoined effective in the 1981–82 school year.)
Huntington University	Huntington, Indiana	1897	United Brethren in Christ	1,776	Foresters	1959
Indiana Wesleyan University	Marion, Indiana	1920	Wesleyan Church	16,535	Wildcats	1973
Marian University	Indianapolis, Indiana	1851	Catholic (S.S.F.)	3,486	Knights	1987
Mount Vernon Nazarene University	Mount Vernon, Ohio	1964	Nazarene	1,671	Cougars	2011
University of Saint Francis	Fort Wayne, Indiana	1890	Catholic (S.S.F.P.A.)	1,763	Cougars	1966; 1994 (Note: Saint Francis left the Crossroads after the 1980–81 school year and rejoined effective with the 1994–95 school year.)
Spring Arbor University	Spring Arbor, Michigan	1873	Free Methodist	2,441	Cougars	2004
Taylor University	Upland, Indiana	1846	Nondenominational	2,548	Trojans	1994

=== Future members ===
The Crossroads will have one future full member, a private school:

Institution	Location	Founded	Affiliation	Enrollment	Nickname	Joining (Note: Represents the calendar year when fall sports competition begins.)	Current conference
Manchester University	North Manchester, Indiana	1860	Church of the Brethren	1,276	Spartans	2027	Heartland (HCAC) (Note: Currently an NCAA Division III athletic conference.)

=== Former members ===
The Crossroads had three former full members, all were private schools:

Institution	Location	Founded	Affiliation	Nickname	Joined (Note: Represents the calendar year when fall sports competition begins.)	Left (Note: Represents the calendar year when spring sports competition ends.)	Subsequent conference(s)	Current conference
Concordia Senior College	Fort Wayne, Indiana	1957	Lutheran LCMS	Cadets	1959	1972	NAIA Independent (1972–77)	Closed in 1977
Indiana Institute of Technology	Fort Wayne, Indiana	1930	Nonsectarian	Warriors	1959	1978	Chicagoland (CCAC) (1978–98)	Wolverine–Hoosier (WHAC) (1998–present)
Trine University	Angola, Indiana	1884	Nonsectarian	Thunder	1959	1981	various (Note: Trine had the following conference affiliations: an NAIA Independent from 1981–82 to 1991–92; the Wolverine–Hoosier Athletic Conference (WHAC) from 1992–93 to 2002–03; and an NCAA D-III Independent during the 2003–04 school year.)	Michigan (MIAA) (Note: Currently an NCAA Division III athletic conference.) (2004–present)

=== Membership timeline ===
Full member (non-football) Full members (men only) Other Conference Other Conference

== Sports ==
Conference sports
Sport	Men's	Women's
Baseball	✓	
Basketball	✓	✓
Cross Country	✓	✓
Golf	✓	✓
Soccer	✓	✓
Softball		✓
Tennis	✓	✓
Track & Field Outdoor	✓	✓
Volleyball	(Note: Crossroads League adding men's volleyball as a sponsored sport in 2026–27.)	✓

== Commissioners Cup ==
Each year, the member institution with the most points based on final rankings in each sport, is awarded the Commissioners Cup (formerly known as the All Sports Trophy). The current holder is Indiana Wesleyan University, which has won the last twelve cups in a row and holds the record for cups won, with eighteen.

== Notable athletes ==
- Stevimir Ercegovac (Taylor University), 4-time national shot put champion, Olympian
- Steve Platt (Huntington University), professional basketball player
- Steve Smith (University of St. Francis), College Slam Dunk Champion
- Eric Stults (Bethel College), pitcher with the Los Angeles Dodgers
- Justin Masterson (Bethel College), pitcher with the Boston Red Sox
- Katie Sowers (Goshen College), first female and first openly gay coach to coach in a Super Bowl
- Addison Wiley (Huntington University), professional distance runner
