= College of Coastal Georgia =

Public college in Brunswick, Georgia, US

Coordinates: 31°11′3″N 81°29′5″W

- Former names: Brunswick College (1961–1965, 1988–1996); Brunswick Junior College (1965–1988); Coastal Georgia Community College (1996–2008)
- Motto: College is Better by the Beach™
- Type: Public college
- Established: 1961
- Parent institution: University System of Georgia
- President: Johnny L. Evans, Jr.
- Faculty: 598
- Undergraduates: 3,600
- Location: Brunswick, Georgia, United States
- Campus: ~200 Acres
- Colors: Navy Blue, Royal Blue & Gray
- Nickname: Mariners
- Sporting affiliations: NAIA – The Sun
- Mascot: Salty
- Website: www.ccga.edu

The College of Coastal Georgia (Coastal Georgia) is a public college in Brunswick, Georgia, United States. It was established in 1961 and opened in 1964, making it one of Georgia's newest state colleges. The college transitioned from a community college into a four-year college and conferred its first baccalaureate degrees on May 7, 2011.

== History ==
The board of regents of the University System of Georgia established the college, originally known as Brunswick College, in 1961 with Brunswick and Glynn County citizens providing a $1 million bond issue for construction of buildings and purchase of land. The college opened in 1964 and shortly after changed its name to Brunswick Junior College in 1965. The college continued expanding the academic facilities on the college's 193-acre (0.78 km^{2}) campus through the late 1960s and 1970s. In 1972, the college added technical programs in addition to the traditional junior college programs and offered both associate programs in higher education and postsecondary technical and adult programs until 2008.

In 1986, the University System of Georgia Board of Regents created the Brunswick Center Consortium composed of Brunswick Junior College, Armstrong State University, and Georgia Southern University. As part of the consortium, the two universities provided the college's students with opportunities to begin schooling at the community college and complete education in one of seven bachelor's degree programs and seven graduate degree programs through one of the two universities. In 1988, the college name reverted to Brunswick College after the board of regents voted to drop "Junior" from the names of all state two-year colleges.

During the late 1980s and 1990s, the college grew into a comprehensive community college, offering over 39 associate degree programs and 21 vocational and technical certificate programs. The board of regents authorized the creation of the Camden Center location in Kingsland in response to growing populations in expanding population of Camden County. The college transformed the former Kingsland Elementary School into the extension location and opened the facility in January 1993. The center offers general education transfer and vocational/technical programs. In 1996, Brunswick College changed its name to Coastal Georgia Community College. In 2004, the Kingsland location moved into a new facility in Kingsland and became known as The Camden Center at The Lakes.

=== Expansion in early 2000s ===
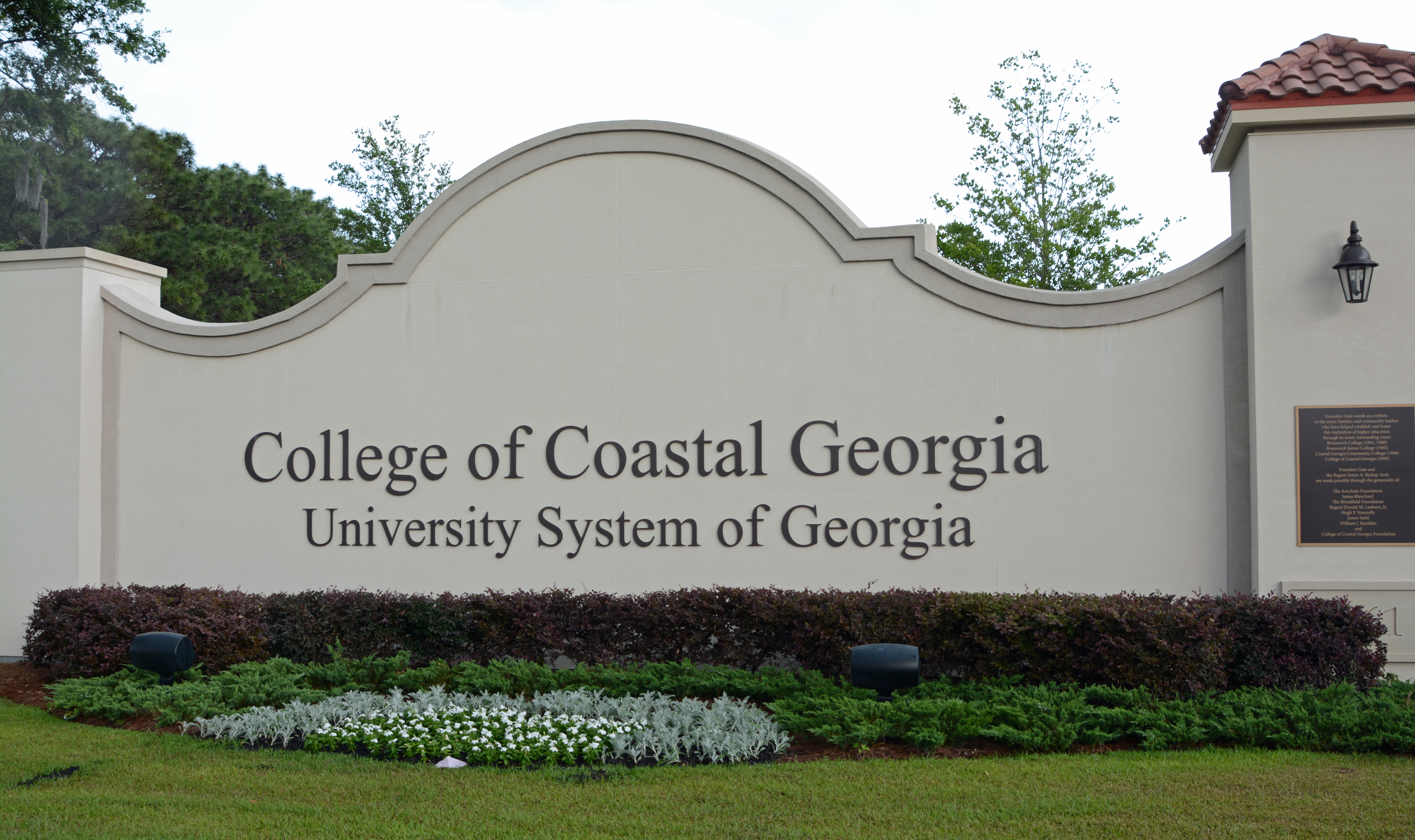
Sign on Altama Avenue

In 2008, the college began transitioning from community college to a four-year college when it announced its 10-year strategic plan for the college. The plans include expansion of academic programs and infrastructure to accommodate an enrollment of more than 10,000. In addition to academic and physical expansion the expansion plans include addition student and residence life programs, as well as expanded athletics. That same year, the vocational and technical programs were transferred to Golden Isles Career Academy in Brunswick, Okefenokee Technical College in Waycross, and Altamaha Technical College in Jesup and the college changed its name to the College of Coastal Georgia. The college began offering its first bachelor's degree programs in business administration, early childhood and special education, and middle school education began in fall 2009 and added a bachelor's degree in nursing in 2010. Shortly after the transition to a four-year college began in 2009, College of Coastal Georgia saw a peak enrollment of over 3,000 students.

However, the last academic building to be built on the Brunswick campus was opened in 1984, and with higher enrollment there was a need for more academic spaces on campus. Therefore, a new Health and Sciences Building was planned to help accommodate the growing class numbers. It opened in 2010 with more than 45,000 square feet of space and the first classes were held in the building on January 10, 2011. Two months later, a dedication ceremony was held for the Miriam and Hugh Nunnally Center for Nursing Education housed in the building. Hugh P. Nunnally Jr. donated one million dollars in memory of his late wife Miriam Nunnally after he had met three nurses who had graduated from the college. Even after his initial donation, Mr. Nunnally continued to provide further investments to the college and the board of regents formally approved the naming the building the Miriam and Hugh Nunnally Health and Sciences Building.

On May 7, 2011, the college conferred its first baccalaureate degrees. Two months later, the college opened the new $12 million student center that includes dining areas, the campus bookstore with a cafe, and a theater; as well as study and recreational areas for students. And one month following that new building, the college opened a 352-bed residential building as the college's first student housing structure. The three-story building features suite-style dorms with individual bedrooms connected to a common living area.

In 2011, the House Appropriations Committee of Georgia approved $7.6 million for a 30,000-square-foot (2,800 m^{2}) classroom and laboratory building, known as the Correll Teacher Education and Learning Center (CTELC). Opened in January 2013, the new building is connected to the Jones Science Building and Academic Commons North and the two older buildings were renovated as part of the project. CTELC includes space for teacher education classes and is located in close proximity to the Brunswick High School, located just off the campus, allowing education majors access to teaching practicum opportunities and helping to facilitate early college entrance for high school students. The building also has multiple high-tech classrooms for other subjects. The opening of CTELC marked an end to the rapid growth on campus.

=== 2010s to Present ===
In 2019, the Clara Wood Gould Memorial Library underwent a renovation which was funded by the University System of Georgia. This project added 3,025 square feet to the library building and remodeled the original 30,998 square feet.

In 2023, the Georgia State Legislature approved a $16 million project to expand the Hugh and Miriam Nunnally Health and Sciences building on the Brunswick campus. The groundbreaking ceremony for the expansion took place on June 10, 2025.

In April 2024, construction began on the Performing Arts Center on the south side of campus. The project had been on-and-off-again for years due to financial issues and the COVID pandemic.

=== Presidents ===
- Earl F. Hargett, 1964-1968
- John W. Teel, 1968-1990
- Dorothy L. Lord, 1991-2008
- Valerie Hepburn, 2009-2013
- Gregory F. Aloia, 2013-2017
- Michelle R. Johnston, 2018–2024
- Johnny L. Evans, Jr., 2024–present

== Campus ==
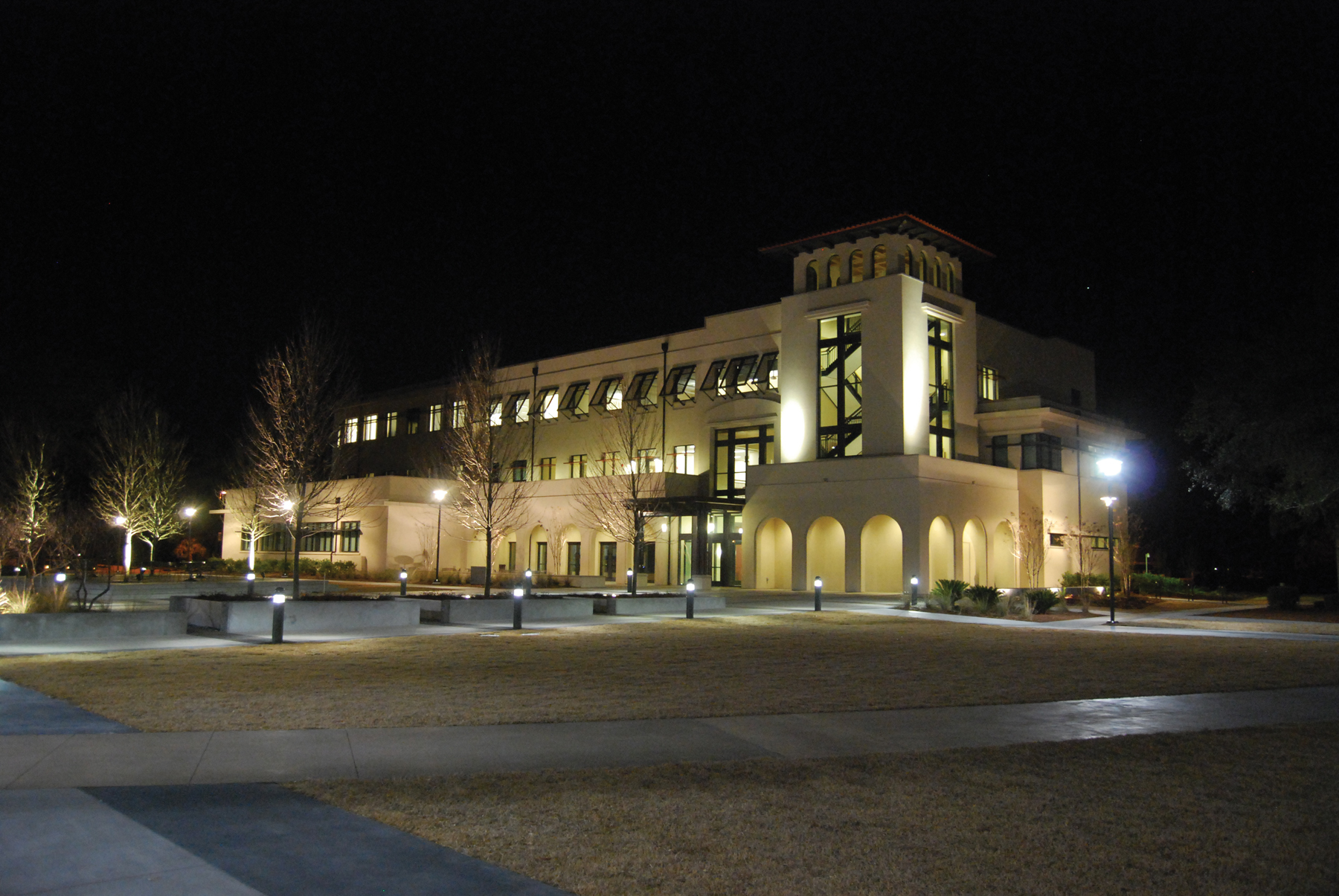
The Miriam & Hugh Nunnally Health and Science Building

Coastal Georgia's main campus is located in Brunswick, Ga, and runs north and south, parallel to Altama Avenue. It consists of a pedestrian mall and a large outdoor square in the middle flanked by Mariner Way in the south, College Drive in the north, and a parking lot on the east side of campus. The Miriam & Hugh Nunnally Health and Science Building and the Gould Memorial Library lie on the south end while the Campus Center and the Academic Commons North are on the north end. The most southern building is the Southeast Georgia Conference Center and the most northern is the Howard Coffin Building and one of the two parking lots. The only buildings on the east side of campus, beyond the other of the two parking lots, are the Student Activity Center and two residence halls, Lakeside Village and Mariner Village.

=== Camden Center ===
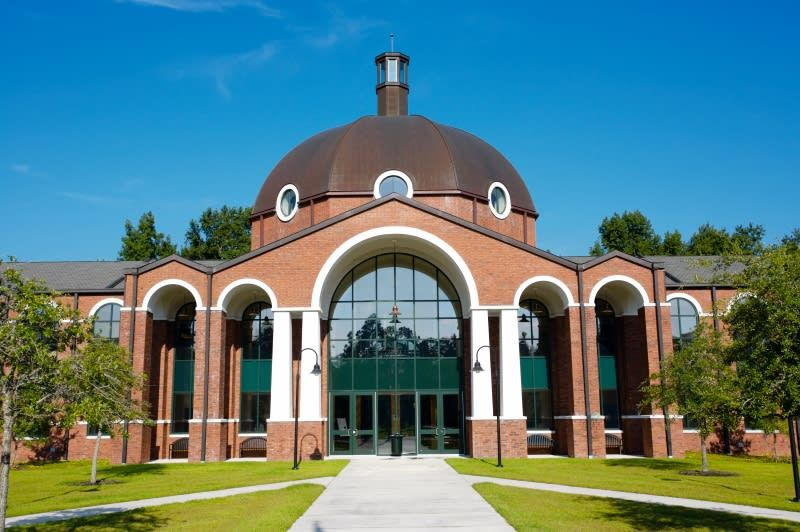
College of Coastal Georgia's Camden Center

The Regents authorized a satellite location to serve Camden County residents in 1992 and classes began in the former Kingsland Elementary School in 1993. A new permanent facility, the Camden Center, opened in 2004. The facility is 101,000 square feet contains; a 270-seat auditorium, classroom, and labs. The director of the Camden Center is Joseph Lodmell.

== Academics ==
Undergraduate demographics as of Fall 2023
Race and ethnicity	Total
White	60%
Black	21%
Hispanic	8%
Unknown	6%
International student	2%
Two or more races	2%
Asian	1%
Economic diversity
Low-income (Note: The percentage of students who received an income-based federal Pell grant intended for low-income students.)	45%
Affluent (Note: The percentage of students who are a part of the American middle class at the bare minimum.)	55%

The College of Coastal Georgia is accredited by the Southern Association of Colleges and Schools, and has had continuous accreditation since 1967. The college offers various majors and areas of study and confers associate degrees and bachelor's degrees from its three schools:

- School of Arts and Sciences
- School of Business and Public Management
- School of Nursing and Health Sciences

== Athletics ==
The Coastal Georgia athletic teams are called the Mariners. The college is a member of the National Association of Intercollegiate Athletics (NAIA), primarily competing in the Sun Conference (formerly known as the Florida Sun Conference (FSC) until after the 2007–08 school year) since the 2017–18 academic year. The Mariners previously competed in the Southern States Athletic Conference (SSAC; formerly known as Georgia–Alabama–Carolina Conference (GACC) until after the 2003–04 school year) from 2012 to 2013 (after becoming a full member of the NAIA following the one-year provisional period) to 2016–17.

Coastal Georgia competes in eight intercollegiate varsity sports: Men's sports include basketball, golf and tennis; while women's sports include basketball, golf, softball, tennis and volleyball.

Until 2011, the college competed in the National Junior College Athletic Association (NJCAA) and as a member of the Georgia Collegiate Athletic Association (GCAA). As part of the college's transformation from a two-year junior college to a four-year institution, Coastal Georgia applied for membership in the NAIA after exploring option to join the National Collegiate Athletic Association (NCAA). The college also began expanding athletics in 2010 with the additions of men's and women's golf and tennis for the 2010–2011 academic year, in which both golf programs placed in the top-10 nationally in the NJCAA championship tournament.

The men's golf program won back-to-back NAIA national championships in 2014 and 2015.

== Notable students ==
- Eban Hyams (born 1981), Indian-born Australian professional basketball player
- Mike Hodges (politician), Georgia State Senator
- Gabby O'Sullivan, Australian basketball player and Australian rules footballer
- Frankie King, American basketball player
- Sólrún Inga Gísladóttir, Icelandic basketball player
- Joe Cravens, American college basketball coach
- Kostas Ezomo, Greek basketball player
