= Madonna University =

Catholic university in Livonia, Michigan, US

- Former names: Presentation of the Blessed Virgin Mary Junior College (1937–1982); Madonna College (1982–1991)
- Motto: Sapientia Desursum (Latin)
- Motto in English: Wisdom from Above
- Type: Private university
- Established: 1937; 89 years ago
- Founder: Felician Sisters
- Religious affiliation: Catholic (Felician Sisters)
- Students: 2,154 (fall 2024)
- Undergraduates: 1,839 (fall 2024)
- Postgraduates: 315 (fall 2024)
- Location: Livonia, Michigan, United States
- Campus: 80 acres (320,000 m^{2}); Suburban
- Colors: Blue & Gold
- Nickname: Crusaders
- Sporting affiliations: NAIA – WHAC; NAIA – MSFA
- Mascot: Cruzer the Crusader
- Website: www.madonna.edu

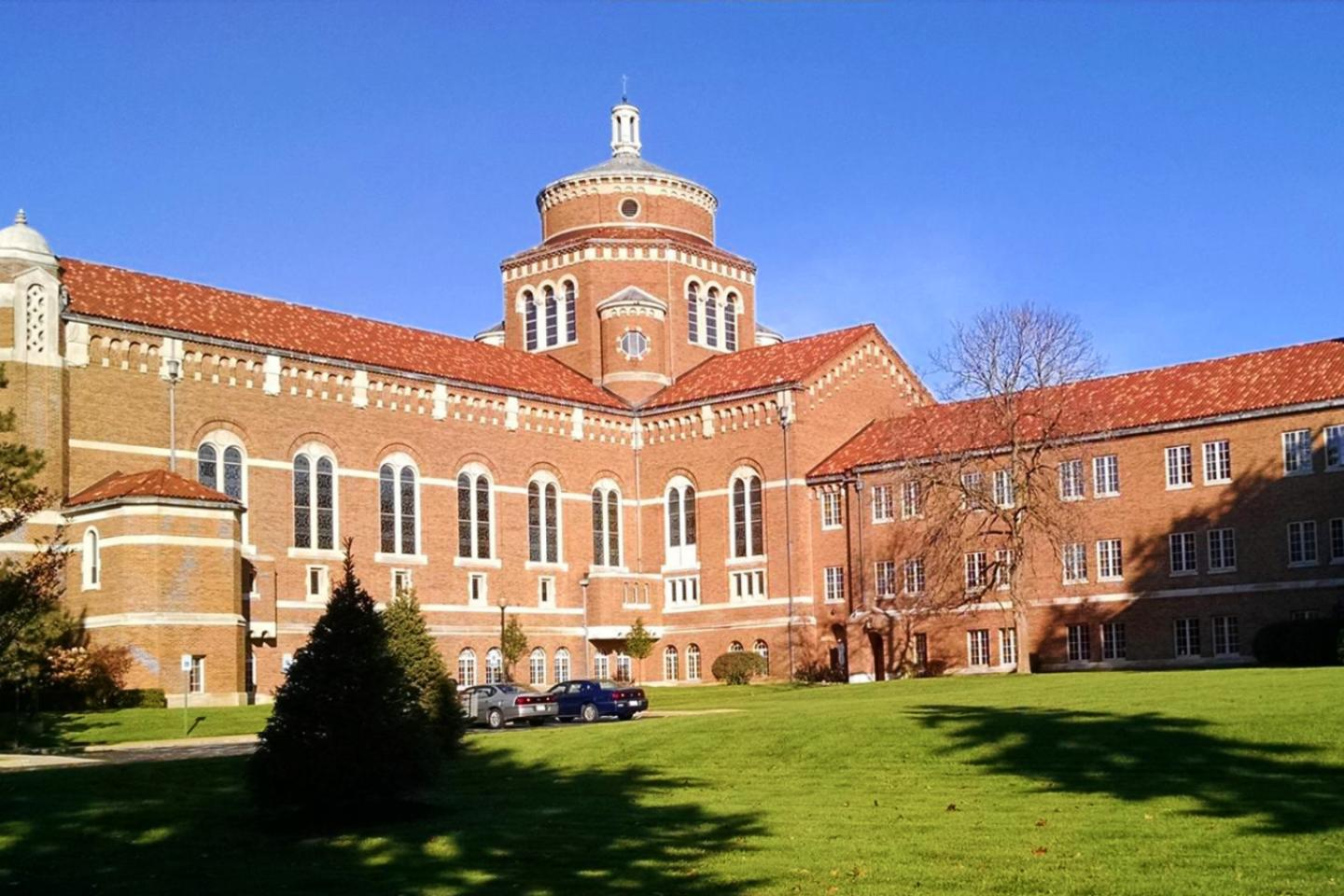
Madonna University

Madonna University is a private Catholic university in Livonia, Michigan, United States. It was founded as the Presentation of the Blessed Virgin Mary Junior College by the Felician Sisters in 1937. It became Madonna College in 1947 and Madonna University in 1991.

Among the largest Franciscan universities in the country, Madonna is situated on an 80-acre (32 ha) wooded campus. It has extension campuses in southwest Detroit, Orchard Lake, and Clinton Township at the Macomb University Center. Madonna University also has a campus at the University Center in Gaylord, about 225 miles (362 km) north of Livonia.

== Academics ==
Founded by two sisters in 1937 as Presentation of the Blessed Virgin Mary College, the university offers more than 100 undergraduate majors toward associate and bachelor's degrees as well as 35 master's programs in clinical psychology, business, criminal justice, education, history, and health professions. In May 2009, Madonna began offering its first doctorate, the Doctor of Nursing Practice. Madonna's most popular undergraduate majors, by 2021 graduates, were:

Registered Nursing/Registered Nurse (281)
Business Administration and Management (62)
Criminal Justice/Safety Studies (53)
International Business/Trade/Commerce (41)
Social Work (22)
General Studies (18)
Biology/Biological Sciences (16)

Madonna University's commitment to developing a sustainable and eco-friendly campus was recognized when the U.S. Green Building Council awarded Gold level LEED® (Leadership in Energy and Environmental Design) certification for the university's 60,000 square feet (5,600 m^{2}) Franciscan Center.

=== Colleges and schools ===
The university is organized into the following colleges and schools:

- College of Arts & Sciences
- College of Education & Human Development
- College of Nursing and Health
- Graduate School
- School of Business

== Campus media ==
The Madonna Now is the university's magazine for alumni and friends. The Madonna Herald is the university's newspaper, which is produced by Madonna's Journalism Department, headed by professor Neal Haldane. The Madonna Muse is an annual literary journal.

In the university's Franciscan Center studios, students operate an online radio station at Live 365. The format is freeform, and features occasional live broadcasts from students of the program.

The Broadcast and Cinema Arts students produce a television show, Celebrate Michigan, which airs on MyTV20 in the Detroit area.

== Athletics ==
The Madonna athletic teams are the Crusaders. The university is a member of the National Association of Intercollegiate Athletics (NAIA), competing in the Wolverine–Hoosier Athletic Conference (WHAC) for most of its sports since the 1997–98 academic year; while its football team competes in the Mideast League of the Mid-States Football Association (MSFA).

Madonna competes in 21 intercollegiate varsity sports. Men's sports include baseball, basketball, bowling, cheerleading, cross country, football, golf, lacrosse, soccer and track & Field; women's sports include basketball, bowling, cheerleading, competitive dance, cross country, golf, lacrosse, soccer, softball, track & field and volleyball.

The campus features a renovated basketball and volleyball gymnasium, Alliance Catholic Credit Union Arena at the Performing Arts, Academics, and Athletics Center, with a capacity of 1,200; international-size soccer field, which hosts camps and tournaments; Ilitch Ballpark baseball field and fast-pitch softball field.

== Notable alumni ==
- Lyn Bankes, member of the Michigan House of Representatives
- Kerry Bentivolio, US Representative (alumnus of Saint Mary's College)
- Ella Bully-Cummings, police chief
- Nora Chapa Mendoza, artist
- Chris Dierker, professional basketball player
- Warren Evans, Michigan politician and police officer
- Vincent Gregory, member of the Michigan Senate
- Charlie Henry, college basketball coach
- Worteh Sampson, college soccer player and coach
- Robert C. Schuler, advertising executive (alumnus of Saint Mary's College)
- John Vigilante, professional hockey player
- Catherine Waynick, Anglican bishop
