= Florida's 18th congressional district =

U.S. House district for Florida

Coordinates: 27°08′18″N 80°22′46″W

- Map of district boundaries
- Representative: Scott Franklin; R–Lakeland
- Area: 1,889 mi^{2} (4,890 km^{2})
- Distribution: 96.37% urban; 3.63% rural
- Population (2025): 895,369
- Median household income: $64,044
- Ethnicity: 55.3% White; 27.0% Hispanic; 12.3% Black; 3.1% Two or more races; 1.5% Asian; 0.7% other
- Cook PVI: R+8

Florida's 18th congressional district is an electoral district for the U.S. Congress, located in the Florida Heartland. In the 2020 redistricting cycle, the district was redrawn to cover inland counties of DeSoto, Glades, Hardee, Hendry, Highlands, and Okeechobee, as well as most of Polk County (including Bartow, eastern Lakeland, and Winter Haven) and some of Immokalee in Collier County. It is essentially the successor to the old 15th district. The district is currently represented by Republican Scott Franklin.

From 2013 to 2023, the district was located in the Treasure Coast and contained the whole of St. Lucie County and Martin County as well as the northeastern part of Palm Beach County, and included Port St. Lucie, Fort Pierce, Stuart, and Jupiter, as well as Treasure Coast International Airport. Much of this district is now the 21st district.

The 18th district was created as a result of the redistricting cycle after the 1980 census. From 1983 to 2012, it was based in South Florida. In its final configuration as a South Florida district, it included portions of Miami-Dade and Monroe counties. The Miami-Dade section included most of the city of Miami, the South Beach section of Miami Beach, and many of the southern Miami suburbs, including Coral Gables and Coral Terrace. The Monroe County section of the district included all of the Florida Keys.

== Recent election results from statewide races ==
Year	Office	Results
2008	President	McCain 55% - 44%
2010	Senate	Rubio 51% - 17%
2010	Governor	Scott 57% - 43%
2010	Attorney General	Bondi 60% - 35%
2010	Chief Financial Officer	Atwater 61% - 34%
2012	President	Romney 56% - 44%
2012	Senate	Nelson 52% - 48%
2014	Governor	Scott 58% - 42%
2016	President	Trump 59% - 37%
2016	Senate	Rubio 59% - 36%
2018	Senate	Scott 60% - 39%
2018	Governor	DeSantis 60% - 38%
2018	Attorney General	Moody 63% - 35%
2018	Chief Financial Officer	Patronis 62% - 38%
2020	President	Trump 61% - 38%
2022	Senate	Rubio 68% - 31%
2022	Governor	DeSantis 69% - 30%
2022	Attorney General	Moody 71% - 29%
2022	Chief Financial Officer	Patronis 69% - 31%
2024	President	Trump 64% - 35%
2024	Senate	Scott 63% - 35%

== Composition ==
For the 118th and successive Congresses (based on redistricting following the 2020 census), the district contains all or portions of the following counties and communities:

Collier County (1)

Immokalee (part; also 26th)

DeSoto County (2)

Arcadia, Southeast Arcadia

Glades County (3)

All 3 communities

Hardee County (9)

All 9 communities

Hendry County (7)

All 7 communities

Highlands County (3)

All 3 communities

Okeechobee County (3)

All 3 communities

Polk County (37)

Alturas, Auburndale, Babson Park, Bartow, Bradley Junction, Combee Settlement, Crooked Lake Park, Crystal Lake, Cypress Gardens, Davenport, Dundee, Eagle Lake, Fort Meade, Frostproof, Fuller Heights, Fussels Corner, Grenelefe, Haines City, Highland City, Highland Park, Hillcrest Heights, Homeland, Indian Lake Estates, Inwood, Jan Phyl Village, Lake Alfred, Lake Hamilton, Lakeland (part; also 15th), Lakeland Highlands, Lake Wales, Loughman, Medulla (part; also 15th), Mulberry, Wahneta, Waverly, Willow Oak (part; also 15th), Winter Haven

== List of members representing the district ==
Member	Party	Years	Cong ress	Electoral history	Counties
District created January 3, 1983
Claude Pepper (Miami)	Democratic	January 3, 1983 – May 30, 1989	98th 99th 100th 101st	Redistricted from the 14th district and re-elected in 1982. Re-elected in 1984. Re-elected in 1986. Re-elected in 1988. Died.	1983–1993; Miami-Dade
Vacant		May 30, 1989 – September 7, 1989	101st		1983–1993; Miami-Dade
Ileana Ros-Lehtinen (Miami)	Republican	September 7, 1989 – January 3, 2013	101st 102nd 103rd 104th 105th 106th 107th 108th 109th 110th 111th 112th	Elected to finish Pepper's term. Re-elected in 1990. Re-elected in 1992. Re-elected in 1994. Re-elected in 1996. Re-elected in 1998. Re-elected in 2000. Re-elected in 2002. Re-elected in 2004. Re-elected in 2006. Re-elected in 2008. Re-elected in 2010. Redistricted to the 27th district.	1983–1993; Miami-Dade
Ileana Ros-Lehtinen (Miami)	Republican	September 7, 1989 – January 3, 2013	101st 102nd 103rd 104th 105th 106th 107th 108th 109th 110th 111th 112th	Elected to finish Pepper's term. Re-elected in 1990. Re-elected in 1992. Re-elected in 1994. Re-elected in 1996. Re-elected in 1998. Re-elected in 2000. Re-elected in 2002. Re-elected in 2004. Re-elected in 2006. Re-elected in 2008. Re-elected in 2010. Redistricted to the 27th district.	1993–2003; Miami-Dade
Ileana Ros-Lehtinen (Miami)	Republican	September 7, 1989 – January 3, 2013	101st 102nd 103rd 104th 105th 106th 107th 108th 109th 110th 111th 112th	Elected to finish Pepper's term. Re-elected in 1990. Re-elected in 1992. Re-elected in 1994. Re-elected in 1996. Re-elected in 1998. Re-elected in 2000. Re-elected in 2002. Re-elected in 2004. Re-elected in 2006. Re-elected in 2008. Re-elected in 2010. Redistricted to the 27th district.	2003–2013 Miami-Dade and Monroe
Patrick Murphy (Jupiter)	Democratic	January 3, 2013 – January 3, 2017	113th 114th	Elected in 2012. Re-elected in 2014. Retired to run for U.S. senator.	2013–2017 Martin, Palm Beach, and St. Lucie
Brian Mast (Palm City)	Republican	January 3, 2017 – January 3, 2023	115th 116th 117th	Elected in 2016. Re-elected in 2018. Re-elected in 2020. Redistricted to the 21st district.	2017–2023 Martin, Palm Beach, and St. Lucie
Scott Franklin (Lakeland)	Republican	January 3, 2023 – present	118th 119th	Redistricted from the 15th district and re-elected in 2022. Re-elected in 2024. Re-elected in 2026.	2023–2027

== Election results ==
=== 2002 ===
Florida's 18th Congressional District Election (2002)
Party	Candidate	Votes	%
Republican	Ileana Ros-Lehtinen*	103,512	69.11
Democratic	Ray Chote	42,852	28.61
Independent	Orin Opperman	3,423	2.29
Total votes		149,787	100.00
Turnout			
Republican hold			

=== 2004 ===
Florida's 18th Congressional District Election (2004)
Party	Candidate	Votes	%
Republican	Ileana Ros-Lehtinen*	143,647	64.73
Democratic	Sam Sheldon	78,281	35.27
Total votes		221,928	100.00
Turnout			
Republican hold			

=== 2006 ===
Florida's 18th Congressional District Election (2006)
Party	Candidate	Votes	%
Republican	Ileana Ros-Lehtinen*	79,631	62.15
Democratic	Dave Patlak	48,499	37.85
Total votes		128,130	100.00
Turnout			
Republican hold			

=== 2008 ===
Florida's 18th Congressional District Election (2008)
Party	Candidate	Votes	%
Republican	Ileana Ros-Lehtinen*	140,617	57.87
Democratic	Annette Taddeo	102,372	41.11
Total votes		242,989	100.00
Turnout			
Republican hold			

=== 2010 ===
Florida's 18th Congressional District Election (2010)
Party	Candidate	Votes	%
Republican	Ileana Ros-Lehtinen*	102,360	68.89
Democratic	Rolando A. Banciella	46,235	31.11
Total votes		148,595	100.00
Turnout			
Republican hold			

=== 2012 ===
Florida's 18th Congressional District Election (2012)
Party	Candidate	Votes	%
Democratic	Patrick Murphy	166,799	50.4
Republican	Allen West*	164,370	49.6
Total votes		331,169	100.00
Turnout			
Democratic gain from Republican			

=== 2014 ===
Florida's 18th Congressional District election (2014)
Party	Candidate	Votes	%
Democratic	Patrick Murphy (Incumbent)	151,478	59.78
Republican	Carl Domino	101,896	40.22
Total votes		253,374	100.00
Democratic hold			

=== 2016 ===
Florida's 18th congressional district election (2016)
Party	Candidate	Votes	%
Republican	Brian Mast	201,488	53.60
Democratic	Randy Perkins	161,918	43.07
No Party Affiliation	Carla Spalding	12,503	3.33
No Party Affiliation	Marilyn Holloman	9	0.00
Total votes		375,918	100
Republican gain from Democratic			

=== 2018 ===
Florida's 18th congressional district election (2018)
Party	Candidate	Votes	%
Republican	Brian Mast (incumbent)	185,905	54.3
Democratic	Lauren Baer	156,454	45.7
Total votes		342,359	100.0
Republican hold			

=== 2020 ===
Florida's 18th congressional district election (2020)
Party	Candidate	Votes	%
Republican	Brian Mast (incumbent)	253,286	56.3
Democratic	Pam Keith	186,674	41.5
No Party Affiliation	K.W. Miller	9,760	2.2
Total votes		449,720	100.0
Republican hold			

=== 2022 ===
Florida's 18th congressional district election (2022)
Party	Candidate	Votes	%
Republican	Scott Franklin (incumbent)	167,429	74.7
Independent	Keith Hayden Jr	56,647	25.2
Total votes		224,076	100.0
Republican hold			

=== 2024 ===
Florida's 18th congressional district election (2024)
Party	Candidate	Votes	%
Republican	Scott Franklin (incumbent)	225,170	65.30
Democratic	Andrea Doria Kale	119,637	34.70
Total votes		344,807	100.0
Republican hold			
