= List of Webber International Warriors head football coaches =

The Webber International Warriors football program is a college football team that represents Webber International University in the NAIA Independent, a part of the National Association of Intercollegiate Athletics. The team has had 2 head coaches since its first recorded football game in 2002. The current coach is Eric Potochney who first took the position for the 2021 season.

== Key ==
Key to symbols in coaches list
General		Overall		Conference		Postseason (Note: Although the first Rose Bowl Game was played in 1902, it has been continuously played since the 1916 game, and is recognized as the oldest bowl game by the NCAA. "—" indicates any season prior to 1916 when postseason games were not played.)	
No.	Order of coaches (Note: A running total of the number of head coaches, with coaches who served separate tenures being counted only once. Interim head coaches are represented with "Int" and are not counted in the running total. "—" indicates the team played but either without a coach or no coach is on record. "X" indicates an interim year without play.)	GC	Games coached	CW	Conference wins	PW	Postseason wins
DC	Division championships	OW	Overall wins	CL	Conference losses	PL	Postseason losses
CC	Conference championships	OL	Overall losses	CT	Conference ties	PT	Postseason ties
NC	National championships	OT	Overall ties (Note: Overtime rules in college football were introduced in 1996, making ties impossible in the period since.)	C%	Conference winning percentage		
†	Elected to the College Football Hall of Fame	O%	Overall winning percentage (Note: When computing the win–loss percentage, a tie counts as half a win and half a loss.)				

== Coaches ==
No.	Name	Term	GC	OW	OL	OT	O%	CW	CL	CT	C%	PW	PL	CCs	Awards
1	Rod Shafer	2002–2005	31	16	15	0	.516	—	—	—	—	—	—	—	—
2	Kelly Scott	2006–2020	144	67	77	0	.465	—	—	—	—	—	—	—	—
3	Eric Potochney	2021–present	51	21	30	0	.412	—	—	—	—	—	—	—	—
