= List of Phi Kappa Tau chapters =

Phi Kappa Tau is an American collegiate fraternity that was founded at the Miami University in Oxford, Ohio on March 17, 1906. In the following list, active chapters are indicated in bold and inactive chapters and institutions are in italics. Associate refers to colonies.

Chapter	Charter date and range	Institution	Location	Status	Ref.
**Alpha**	1906–2016, 2023	Miami University	Oxford, Ohio	Active	(Note: Fraternity and chapter was formed as the Non-Fraternity Association. Later changed name to Phrenocon Association and operated under that name until it took the Greek letter name Phi Kappa Tau in 1916.)
**Beta**	1911	Ohio University	Athens, Ohio	Active	(Note: Chapter formed from the Barbarians (local), established in 1906. Later, the chapter absorbed Alpha Delta Beta.)
**Gamma**	1912–2007, 2012	Ohio State University	Columbus, Ohio	Active	
**Delta**	1914–1934, 1948	Centre College	Danville, Kentucky	Active	(Note: Chapter formed from Zenophilia, established in 1913.)
**Epsilon**	1915	University of Mount Union	Alliance, Ohio	Active	(Note: Chapter formed from Agora, established in 1915.)
**Zeta**	1916–1942, 1947–1997, 2016	University of Illinois Urbana-Champaign	Champaign, Illinois	Active	(Note: Chapter formed from Loyante, established in 1915.)
Eta	1918–1994, 2000–2013	Muhlenberg College	Allentown, Pennsylvania	Inactive	(Note: Chapter formed from Alpha Sigma, established in 1914.)
**Theta**	1919	Transylvania University	Lexington, Kentucky	Active	(Note: Chapter formed from Phi Beta Nu, established in 1917.)
**Iota**	1920–1934, 1951	Coe College	Cedar Rapids, Iowa	Active	(Note: Chapter formed from Delta Gamma Rho, established in 1918. After dormancy, it was reformed from Chi Beta Phi, which was established in 1930.)
**Kappa**	1920–1990, 1996	University of Kentucky	Lexington, Kentucky	Active	(Note: Chapter formed from Kappa Zeta Rho, established in 1919.)
**Lambda**	1920–2009, 2012	Purdue University	West Lafayette, Indiana	Active	(Note: Chapter formed Beta Xi Alpha, established in 1919. Chapter absorbed the Phi Chapter of Theta Tau in 2024)
Mu	1920–2019	Lawrence University	Appleton, Wisconsin	Inactive	(Note: Chapter formed from Tau Alpha Sigma, established in 1919.)
**Nu**	1921	University of California, Berkeley	Berkeley, California	Active	(Note: Chapter formed from Orond Club, established in 1916.)
**Xi**	1921-2020, 2026	Franklin & Marshall College	Lancaster, Pennsylvania	Associate	(Note: Chapter formed from Marshall Club, established in 1909.)
**Omicron**	1922–2015, 2021	Pennsylvania State University	State College, Pennsylvania	Active	(Note: Chapter formed from Delta Tau Omega, established in 1921.)
Pi	1922–1988, 2018-2023	University of Southern California	Los Angeles, California	Inactive	(Note: Chapter formed from Alpha Phi Kappa, established in 1921. Later, it absorbed Alpha Nu Delta.)
**Rho**	1922	Rensselaer Polytechnic Institute	Troy, New York	Associate	(Note: Chapter formed from Kappa Omicron Sigma, established in 1920.)
Sigma	1922–1957	Syracuse University	Syracuse, New York	Inactive	(Note: Chapter formed from Phi Sigma Psi, established in 1920.)
Tau	1923–1971, 1984–199x ?	University of Michigan	Ann Arbor, Michigan	Inactive	(Note: Chapter formed from Phi Tau Club, established in 1921.)
**Upsilon**	1923–2007, 2012	Nebraska Wesleyan University	Lincoln, Nebraska	Active	(Note: Chapter formed from Phi Beta Sigma, established in 1888.)
**Phi**	1923–1937, 1939	Bethany College	Bethany, West Virginia	Active	(Note: Chapter formed from the Rechabite Club, established in 1910.)
**Chi**	1923–1941, 1946–2010, 2019	North Carolina State University	Raleigh, North Carolina	Active	(Note: Chapter formed from Psi Psi Lambda, established in 1920.)
**Psi**	1924–2005, 2013	University of Colorado Boulder	Boulder, Colorado	Active	(Note: Chapter formed from Alpha Beta, established in 1922.)
Omega	1924–1939, 1986–2012, 2022–2023	University of Wisconsin–Madison	Madison, Wisconsin	Inactive	(Note: Chapter formed from Alpha Theta Pi, established in 1922.)
Alpha Alpha	1924–1972, 1986–2007, 2017–2022	Michigan State University	East Lansing, Michigan	Inactive	(Note: Chapter formed from Dorian Literary Society, established in 1915.)
Alpha Beta	1924–1942	New York University	New York City, New York	Inactive	(Note: Chapter formed from Phi Lambda Beta, established in 1921. Later, it absorbed Sigma Pi Epsilon.)
**Alpha Gamma**	1924–1936, 1947–1998, 2021	University of Delaware	Newark, Delaware	Active	(Note: Chapter formed from Gamma Delta Rho.)
Alpha Delta	1925–1992, 2001–2021	Case Western Reserve University	Cleveland, Ohio	Inactive	(Note: Chapter formed from Tau Gamma Psi, established in 1922.)
Alpha Epsilon	1925–1942, 1949–1996	Kansas State University	Manhattan, Kansas	Inactive	(Note: Chapter formed from Phi Kappa Theta, established in 1922.)
Alpha Zeta	1925–1982, 1985–1987	Oregon State University	Corvallis, Oregon	Inactive	(Note: Chapter formed from Lambda Phi Delta, established in 1923.)
**Alpha Eta**	1926	University of Florida	Gainesville, Florida	Active	(Note: Chapter formed from Sigma Kappa Phi, established in 1923.)
Alpha Theta	1926–1981, 1989–2012, 2017–2019	College of William & Mary	Williamsburg, Virginia	Inactive	(Note: Chapter formed from Pi Epsilon Beta, established in 1922.)
Alpha Iota	1926–1941	University of Pennsylvania	Philadelphia, Pennsylvania	Inactive	(Note: Chapter formed from Sigma Alpha, established in 1924.)
**Alpha Kappa**	1927	Washington State University	Pullman, Washington	Active	(Note: Chapter formed from Omega Phi, established in 1924.)
Alpha Lambda	1927–1939, 1942-2025	Auburn University	Auburn, Alabama	Inactive	(Note: Chapter formed from Sigma Theta, established in 1923 from the former Sigma chapter of Beta Kappa. After dormancy, the chapter was reformed in 1939 from Beta Kappa, originally organized in 1931. Reclosed 2025 due to hazing)
Alpha Mu	1928–1935, 1949–1958	Ohio Wesleyan University	Delaware, Ohio	Inactive	(Note: Chapter formed from Phi Alpha Pi, established in 1923. Later, it absorbed Kappa Delta Alpha.)
Alpha Nu	1928–1943, 1946–1999	Iowa State University	Ames, Iowa	Inactive	(Note: Chapter formed from Alpha Kappa Delta, established in 1920.)
**Alpha Xi**	1928–1943, 2024	West Virginia University	Morgantown, West Virginia	Associate	(Note: Chapter formed from Tau Theta Rho, established in 1923.)
Alpha Omicron	1928–1937, 1948–1956, 1958–1975	Lafayette College	Easton, Pennsylvania	Inactive	(Note: Chapter formed from Delta Sigma, established in 1925. Later, it absorbed Arrows and Alpha Sigma Delta. After dormancy, it was revived in 1956 by absorbing Delta Sigma, established in 1956.)
Alpha Pi	1929–1965, 1980–1999, 2005-2023	University of Washington	Seattle, Washington	Inactive	(Note: Chapter formed from Sigma Tau Epsilon, established in 1926.)
**Alpha Rho**	1929–1939, 1946–2014, 2021	Georgia Tech	Atlanta, Georgia	Active	(Note: Chapter formed from Pi Lambda Delta, established in 1922.)
**Alpha Sigma**	1929–1997, 2002–2007, 2016	Colorado State University	Fort Collins, Colorado	Active	(Note: Chapter formed from Alpha Kappa Alpha, established in 1921.)
**Alpha Tau**	1930–1995, 2001	Cornell University	Ithaca, New York	Active	(Note: Chapter formed from Phj Delta Sigma, established in 1908.)
**Alpha Upsilon**	1937–1972, 2007	Colgate University	Hamilton, New York	Active	(Note: Chapter formed from Delta Pi Sigma, established in 1927.)
**Alpha Phi**	1938	University of Akron	Akron, Ohio	Active	(Note: Chapter formed from Sigma Beta Nu, established in 1923.)
**Alpha Chi**	1938–1997, 2015	Mississippi State University	Mississippi State, Mississippi	Active	(Note: Chapters formed from Phi Tau Club, established in 1937.)
Alpha Psi	1941–1994	University of Texas at El Paso	El Paso, Texas	Inactive	(Note: Chapter formed from Rho Sigma Phi, established in 1939.)
**Alpha Omega**	1942	Baldwin Wallace University	Berea, Ohio	Active	(Note: Chapter formed from Zeta Kappa, established in 1922.)
Beta Alpha	1943–1971, 1982–1988, 2012-2025	University of Texas at Austin	Austin, Texas	Inactive	(Note: Chapter formed from Phi Theta Tau, established in 1942.)
**Beta Beta**	1947	University of Louisville	Louisville, Kentucky	Active	
**Beta Gamma**	1947–2007, 2015	University of Idaho	Moscow, Idaho	Active	
Beta Delta	1948–1963	University of Miami	Coral Gables, Florida	Inactive	
**Beta Epsilon**	1948	University of Southern Mississippi	Hattiesburg, Mississippi	Active	(Note: Chapter formed from Beta Kappa Tau, established in 1948.)
**Beta Zeta**	1948–1989, 1993–200x ?, 2026	New Mexico State University	Las Cruces, New Mexico	Associate	
Beta Eta	1948–1954	University of New Mexico	Albuquerque, New Mexico	Inactive	(Note: Chapter formed from Phi Tau Club, established in 1948.)
**Beta Theta**	1948–1971, 1989–2014, 2025	University of Kansas	Lawrence, Kansas	Active	
Beta Iota	1949–1996, 2003–2019	Florida State University	Tallahassee, Florida	Inactive	(Note: Chapter formed from Gamma Phi, established in 1947.)
**Beta Kappa**	1949	Oklahoma State University	Stillwater, Oklahoma	Active	
Beta Lambda	1949–1993, 2005–2021	Indiana University Bloomington	Bloomington, Indiana	Inactive	(Note: Chapter formed from Garnet Club, established in 1947. It was closed by the university and the national fraternity for significant hazing and academic dishonesty. It is eligible to return to campus in August 2026.)
**Beta Mu**	1949–1968, 1989–2008, 2012	Kent State University	Kent, Ohio	Active	(Note: Chapter formed from Phi Kappa Delta, established in 1948.)
**Beta Nu**	1950–1958, 2024	San Diego State University	San Diego, California	Associate	(Note: Chapter formed from Kappa Phi Sigma, established in 1926.)
**Beta Xi**	1950–2004, 2011	University of Georgia	Athens, Georgia	Active	
**Beta Omicron**	1950–1986, 1993–2019	University of Maryland, College Park	College Park, Maryland	Active	
Beta Pi	1950–1972	Middlebury College	Middlebury, Vermont	Inactive	
Beta Rho	1950–1959, 1984–1987	University of California, Los Angeles	Los Angeles, California	Inactive	
Beta Sigma	1950–1961	Idaho State University	Pocatello, Idaho	Inactive	
Beta Tau	1950–2010	Bowling Green State University	Bowling Green, Ohio	Inactive	(Note: Chapters formed from Delta Phi Beta, established in 1948.)
Beta Upsilon	1952–1985	Hobart College	Geneva, New York	Inactive	
**Beta Phi**	1952	Westminster College	New Wilmington, Pennsylvania	Active	(Note: Chapter formed from Delta Nu, established in 1950.)
**Beta Chi**	1953–1979, 2008	Southern Illinois University Carbondale	Carbondale, Illinois	Active	(Note: Chapter formed from Chi Delta Chi, established in 1932.)
**Beta Psi**	1956–199x ?, 2001	California State University, Long Beach	Long Beach, California	Active	
**Beta Omega**	1958	California State University, Chico	Chico, California	Active	(Note: Chapter formed from Iota Sigma, established in 1922.)
**Gamma Alpha**	1959	Michigan Technological University	Houghton, Michigan	Active	(Note: Chapter formed from Mu Kappa Mu, established in 1957.)
**Gamma Beta**	1959	University of Cincinnati	Cincinnati, Ohio	Active	
Gamma Gamma	1960–1976, 1987–2006	St. John's University	New York City, New York	Inactive	
Gamma Delta	1961–199x ?, 1997–200x ?	Northern Michigan University	Marquette, Michigan	Inactive	(Note: Chapter formed from Sigma Rho Epsilon, established in 1956.)
Gamma Epsilon	1961–1978	University of the Pacific	Stockton, California	Inactive	(Note: Chapter formed from Alpha Kappa Phi, established in 1854.)
Gamma Zeta	1961–1971	University of Connecticut	Storrs, Connecticut	Inactive	(Note: Chapter formed from Phi Kappa Alpha, established in 1957.)
Gamma Eta	1962–2018, 2023-2026	East Carolina University	Greenville, North Carolina	Inactive	
Gamma Theta	1962–1974, 1999–2003	Western Michigan University	Kalamazoo, Michigan	Inactive	(Note: Chapter formed from Beta Theta Upsilon, established in 1960.)
Gamma Iota	1963–1987, 2016–2021	California State University, Sacramento	Sacramento, California	Inactive	(Note: Chapter formed from Xi Theta Chi, established in 1946.)
Gamma Kappa	1964–1975, 1994–xxxx ?	LIU Post	Brookville, New York	Inactive	
Gamma Lambda	1965–1989, 1993–2018	Central Michigan University	Mount Pleasant, Michigan	Inactive	(Note: Chapter formed from Lambda Nu, established in 1963.)
**Gamma Mu**	1965–2017	Bradley University	Peoria, Illinois	Active	
Gamma Nu	1966-2017	Rochester Institute of Technology	Rochester, New York	Inactive	(Note: Chapter formed from Kappa Phi Omega, established in 1962.)
**Gamma Xi**	1966	East Central University	Ada, Oklahoma	Active	
**Gamma Omicron**	1966–2019, 2026	California State University, Fullerton	Fullerton, California	Active	(Note: Chapter formed from Sigma Phi Omega, established in 1960.)
Gamma Pi	1967–2011	Youngstown State University	Youngstown, Ohio	Inactive	(Note: Chapter formed from Zeta Phi, established in 1956.)
Gamma Rho	1967–1997	University of Nebraska at Kearney	Kearney, Nebraska	Inactive	
**Gamma Sigma**	1967–1971, 2025	University of California, Davis	Davis, California	Associate	
Gamma Tau	1967–1972, 2007–2020	Old Dominion University	Norfolk, Virginia	Inactive	(Note: Chapter formed from Omega Phi Sigma, established in 1962.)
Gamma Upsilon	1967–1970, 19xx ?–1999	Spring Hill College	Mobile, Alabama	Inactive	(Note: Chapter formed from Gamma Sigma, established in 1963.)
Gamma Phi	1968–1976, 1988–1995	Northeastern University	Boston, Massachusetts	Inactive	(Note: Chapter formed from Zeta Gamma Tau, established in 1959. After going dormant, it reformed in 1976 from Phi Delta Nu.)
Gamma Chi	1968–1978	Delta State University	Cleveland, Mississippi	Inactive	(Note: Chapter formed from Phi Tau Delta, established in 1963.)
**Gamma Psi**	1968–1988, 2014	Texas State University	San Marcos, Texas	Active	(Note: Chapter formed from Sigma Kappa Epsilon, established in 1965.)
Gamma Omega	1968–1971	La Salle University	Philadelphia, Pennsylvania	Inactive	(Note: Chapter formed from Sigma Phi Lambda, established in 1961.)
Delta Alpha	1968–1984	Iowa Wesleyan University	Mount Pleasant, Iowa	Inactive	
**Delta Beta**	1968	University of Evansville	Evansville, Indiana	Active	(Note: Chapter formed from the Sodalitas, established in 1967.)
**Delta Gamma**	1969	University of Mississippi	Oxford, Mississippi	Active	
Delta Delta	1969–1971, 1994–2015	Bryant University	Smithfield, Rhode Island	Inactive	(Note: Chapter formed from Kappa Tau, established in 1945. After dormancy, it reformed from Kappa Tau, established in 1971.)
Delta Epsilon	1969–1980, 1994–2021	St. Cloud State University	St. Cloud, Minnesota	Inactive	
Delta Zeta	1970–1977	Emporia State University	Emporia, Kansas	Inactive	
Delta Eta	1970–1971	Marshall University	Huntington, West Virginia	Inactive	(Note: Chapter formed from Beta Nu, established in 1966.)
**Delta Theta**	1970–2019, 2023	Georgetown College	Georgetown, Kentucky	Active	
Delta Iota	1970–1975	New Mexico Highlands University	Las Vegas, New Mexico	Inactive	(Note: Chapter formed from Kappa Theta, established in 1931.)
**Delta Kappa**	1971–2014, 2021	University of Tennessee	Knoxville, Tennessee	Active	
**Delta Lambda**	1971	Muskingum University	New Concord, Ohio	Active	(Note: Chapter formed from the Alban Club, established in 1925.)
Delta Mu	1971–1983	Santa Fe University of Art and Design	Santa Fe, New Mexico	Inactive	
**Delta Nu**	1975–2018, 2021	Wright State University	Fairborn, Ohio	Active	
Delta Xi	1975–1990	Cleveland State University	Cleveland, Ohio	Inactive	
Delta Omicron	1975–1986	University of Texas–Pan American	Edinburg, Texas	Inactive	
Delta Pi	1982–1987, 2005–2022	Murray State University	Murray, Kentucky	Inactive	
**Delta Rho**	1982–2013, 2021	Eastern Kentucky University	Richmond, Kentucky	Active	
Delta Sigma	1982–xxxx ?	Webber International University	Babson Park, Florida	Inactive	
**Delta Tau**	1984	California State Polytechnic University, Pomona	Pomona, California	Active	(Note: Chapter formed from Alpha Kappa Sigma, established in 1958.)
**Delta Upsilon**	1984–1989	University of Tennessee at Martin	Martin, Tennessee	Inactive	
Delta Phi	1985–1999	University of Arkansas	Fayetteville, Arkansas	Inactive	(Note: Chapter formed from Chi Gamma Phi, established in 1983.)
Delta Chi	1986–200x ?, 2012–2022	University of Rochester	Rochester, New York	Active	
Delta Psi	1986–2007	Rider University	Lawrence Township, New Jersey	Inactive	
**Delta Omega**	1987	Truman State University	Kirksville, Missouri	Active	
**Epsilon Alpha**	1987–xxxx ?	Texas A&M University	College Station, Texas	Associate	
Epsilon Beta	1987–2019	West Virginia University Institute of Technology	Beckley, West Virginia	Inactive	
**Epsilon Gamma**	1988–2016, 2026	The College of New Jersey	Ewing Township, New Jersey	Active	
**Epsilon Delta**	1988–1995, 1999–2018, 2021-2025	Virginia Wesleyan University	Virginia Beach, Virginia	Inactive	(Note: Chapter forme from Sigma Chi Delta.)
**Epsilon Epsilon**	1989–2001, 2013	William Paterson University	Wayne, New Jersey	Active	
Epsilon Zeta	1989–2011	Buffalo State University	Buffalo, New York	Inactive	
Epsilon Eta	1989–2019, 2025	State University of New York at Oswego	Oswego, New York	Inactive	
**Epsilon Theta**	1991	San Francisco State University	San Francisco, California	Active	(Note: Chapter formed from Alpha Sigma Chi, established in 1988.)
Epsilon Iota	1993–2004	Barry University	Miami Shores, Florida	Inactive	(Note: Chapter formed from Tau Kappa Beta, established in 1991.)
**Epsilon Kappa**	1993	Rutgers University–New Brunswick	New Brunswick, New Jersey	Active	
**Epsilon Lambda**	1994	Longwood University	Farmville, Virginia	Active	
Epsilon Mu	1994–2022	University of North Carolina at Pembroke	Pembroke, North Carolina	Inactive	(Note: Chapter formed from Sigma Phi Sigma, established in 1991.)
**Epsilon Nu**	1995–2017, 2023	Clemson University	Clemson, South Carolina	Active	
Epsilon Xi	1995–2015	Pace University	New York City, New York	Inactive	
Epsilon Omicron	1996–2000	Frostburg State University	Frostburg, Maryland	Inactive	(Note: Chapter formed from Alpha Rho Epsilon, established in 1993.)
Epsilon Pi	1997–2008	Northern Kentucky University	Highland Heights, Kentucky	Inactive	
**Epsilon Rho**	1997	Indiana University of Pennsylvania	Indiana, Pennsylvania	Active	
**Epsilon Sigma**	1998	Chapman University	Orange, California	Active	
Epsilon Tau	1998–2023	University of Arizona	Tucson, Arizona	Inactive	
**Epsilon Upsilon**	1998–2007	Saint Louis University	St. Louis, Missouri	Associate	
Epsilon Phi	1999–2007	Indiana State University	Terre Haute, Indiana	Inactive	
**Epsilon Chi**	2001	Virginia Tech	Blacksburg, Virginia	Active	
Epsilon Psi	2001–2004	John Carroll University	University Heights, Ohio	Inactive	(Note: Chapter formed from Delta Kappa Psi, established in 1972.)
Epsilon Omega	2002–2023	Shepherd University	Shepherdstown, West Virginia	Inactive	
**Zeta Alpha**	2006	Belmont University	Nashville, Tennessee	Active	
Zeta Beta	2009–2020	Saginaw Valley State University	University Center, Michigan	Inactive	
Zeta Gamma	2012-2025	San Jose citywide	San Jose, California	Inactive	
Zeta Delta	2012–2016	College of Charleston	Charleston, South Carolina	Inactive	
**Zeta Epsilon**	2014	University of Lynchburg	Lynchburg, Virginia	Active	
**Zeta Zeta**	2014	University of Illinois Springfield	Springfield, Illinois	Active	
**Zeta Eta**	2014	University of Alabama	Tuscaloosa, Alabama	Active	
**Zeta Theta**	2015	University of North Texas	Denton, Texas	Active	
Zeta Iota	2015–2021	Indiana University Kokomo	Kokomo, Indiana	Inactive	
Zeta Kappa	2015–2023	Kenyon College	Gambier, Ohio	Inactive	(Note: Chapter formed from Sigma Tau Phi, established in 2012.)
Zeta Lambda	2015-2024	Middle Tennessee State University	Murfreesboro, Tennessee	Inactive	
**Zeta Mu**	2016–2019, 2023	Appalachian State University	Boone, North Carolina	Active	
Zeta Nu	2016–2021	University of Minnesota Duluth	Duluth, Minnesota	Inactive	
**Zeta Xi**	2017	University of South Carolina	Columbia, South Carolina	Active	
**Zeta Omicron**	2018	Arizona State University	Tempe, Arizona	Active	
**Zeta Pi**	2018	Boston University	Boston, Massachusetts	Active	
Zeta Rho	2019–2021	Columbus State University	Columbus, Georgia	Inactive	
**Zeta Sigma**	2026	Grand Valley State University	Allendale, Michigan	Active	
**Zeta Omega**	2026	South Dakota School of Mines and Technology	Rapid City, South Dakota	Active	
		University of Dayton	Dayton, Ohio	Associate	
		Texas Tech University	Lubbock, Texas	Associate	
		Nova Southeastern University	Davie, Florida	Associate	
		Shenandoah University	Winchester, Virginia	Associate	
		University of Pittsburgh	Pittsburgh, Pennsylvania	Associate	
		University of Nevada, Las Vegas	Las Vegas, Nevada	Interest Group	
