= Rod Shafer =

American football coach

Coaching career (HC unless noted)
- 1978–1982: North Vermillion HS (IN) (assistant)
- 1983–1988: Danville HS (IN) (assistant)
- 1989–1990: Terehaute HS (IN) (assistant)
- 1991–2001: Lake Wales HS (FL)
- 2002–2005: Webber International
- 2006–2013: Lake Wales HS (FL)
- 2014–2018: Warner
- 2020: Frostproof HS (FL) (WR)

Head coaching record
- Overall: 243–45 (high school); 33–46 (college); 3–1 (club)

Rod Shafer is an American former college football coach. He was the head football coach at Webber International University in Babson Park, Florida, from 2002 to 2005 and Warner University in Lake Wales, Florida, from 2014 until his retirement in 2018.

Shafer served as an assistant coach for high schools in Indiana and Florida throughout his career. He served two stints as the head football coach for Lake Wales High School and amassed a 243–45 record.

In 2015, Shafer was inducted into the Florida Coaches Hall of Fame.

== Head coaching record ==
=== College ===
| Year | Team | Overall | Conference | Standing | Bowl/playoffs |
|---|---|---|---|---|---|
Webber International Warriors (NAIA independent) (2003–2005)
| 2003 | Webber International | 3–7 | | | |
| 2004 | Webber International | 5–5 | | | |
| 2005 | Webber International | 4–4 | | | |
| Webber International: | | 12–16 | | | |
Warner Royals (Sun Conference) (2014–2016)
| 2014 | Warner | 5–5 | 3–2 | T–2nd | |
| 2015 | Warner | 2–9 | 0–5 | 6th | |
| 2016 | Warner | 8–2 | 4–1 | 2nd | |
Warner Royals (Mid-South Conference) (2017–2018)
| 2017 | Warner | 4–6 | 2–3 | 4th (Sun) | |
| 2018 | Warner | 2–8 | 2–4 | T–4th (Sun) | |
| Warner: | | 21–30 | 11–15 | | |
| Total: | | 33–46 | | | |

=== Club ===
| Year | Team | Overall | Conference | Standing | Bowl/playoffs |
|---|---|---|---|---|---|
Webber International Warriors (club) (2002)
| 2002 | Webber International | 3–1 | | | |
| Webber International: | | 3–1 | | | |
| Total: | | 3–1 | | | |
