= George W. Jenkins High School =

Florida high school

Location
- 6000 Lakeland Highlands Road; Lakeland, Polk County, Florida 33813; United States; 27°57′27″N 81°55′15″W

Information
- School type: Public High School
- Motto: Prompt, Polite, Prepared
- Established: 1993
- Status: Open
- School district: Polk County Public Schools
- School code: 100894
- Principal: Tom Patton
- Faculty: 123
- Teaching staff: 109.00 (FTE)
- Grades: 9–12
- Enrollment: 2,451 (2022-2023)
- Student to teacher ratio: 22.49
- Hours in school day: 7 Hours
- Colors: Green and Gold
- Sports: Basketball, Baseball, Cheerleading, Cross-Country, Football, Golf, Soccer, Softball, Swimming, Tennis, Track, Volleyball, Weightlifting, Wind Dancers, and Wrestling
- Nickname: Eagles
- Rival: Lakeland High School
- Feeder schools: Lakeland Highlands Middle School, Lawton Chiles Middle Academy, Southwest Middle School
- Website: georgejenkinshigh.polkschoolsfl.com

George W. Jenkins High School serves Lakeland Highlands, Florida, and Medulla, Florida, the two southernmost unincorporated communities of Lakeland, Florida, a city with a population of 112,641 and a surrounding community of more than 700,000. The school, more commonly known as "George Jenkins" or “GJ”, is part of the Polk County Public Schools system.

It was founded in 1993 and named after George W. Jenkins, founder of Publix, the Lakeland-based supermarket chain. The school was opened to relieve overcrowding at Lakeland High School, Kathleen High School, and Bartow High School. The $25 million campus sits on ninety-five acres in the southeast corner of Lakeland.

The school's mascot is Louie the Eagle and its colors are green and gold.

== Students/faculty ==
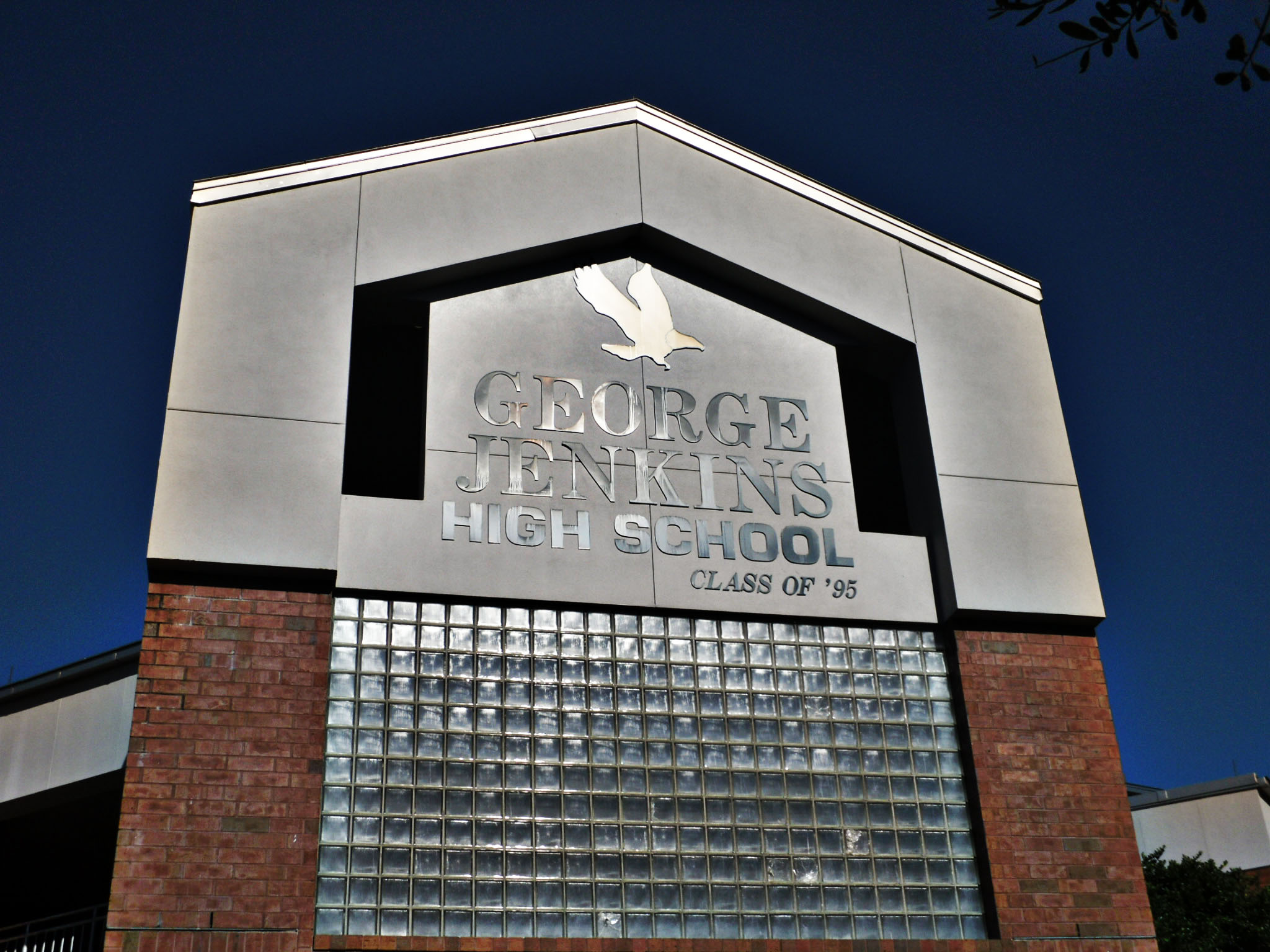
The part of the school overlooking the entrance, with a sign donated by the class of 1995.

George W. Jenkins High School has 2,291 students and 123 teachers. The school has produced twenty-two National Merit Scholar finalists since its second operating year, 1994. The school year is divided into two, eighteen-week semesters. Each student attends four classes each Wednesday and Thursday, And seven classes Monday, Tuesday and Friday.

== National test scores ==
SAT Scores (218 Students, 2006–2007)

Locality	Verbal	Math	Writing
Local Average	500	509	485
State Average	497	496	479
National Average	502	496	494

ACT Scores (153 Students, 2006–2007)

Locality	Score
Local Average	22.0
State Average	19.9
National Average	21.2

== Athletics ==
George Jenkins offers students more than 18 sports during Fall, Spring and Winter. Some of the school's sports offerings include football, baseball/softball, basketball, tennis, golf, cross country/track, soccer, swimming, volleyball, weightlifting, girls' flag football, and boys' wrestling.

George Jenkins has won two state titles in its school history, one in 1998 by the Boys Tennis team and the other one by the Girls Soccer team on February 13, 2008. The soccer team defeated Satellite High School to capture the Class 5A State Championship. George Jenkins is represented by its Dream Maker band at all large sporting activities. Also, George Jenkins is represented by the ensemble Golden Harmony, who sings the National Anthem at most sporting activities.

== Notable alumni ==
- Lance Niekro, 1997 GJHS graduate. Major League Baseball player with the San Francisco Giants. Son of MLB 221 games winning knuckleballer pitcher Joe Niekro.
- Chris Fontaine, 2000 graduate, NASCAR driver.

== Administration ==
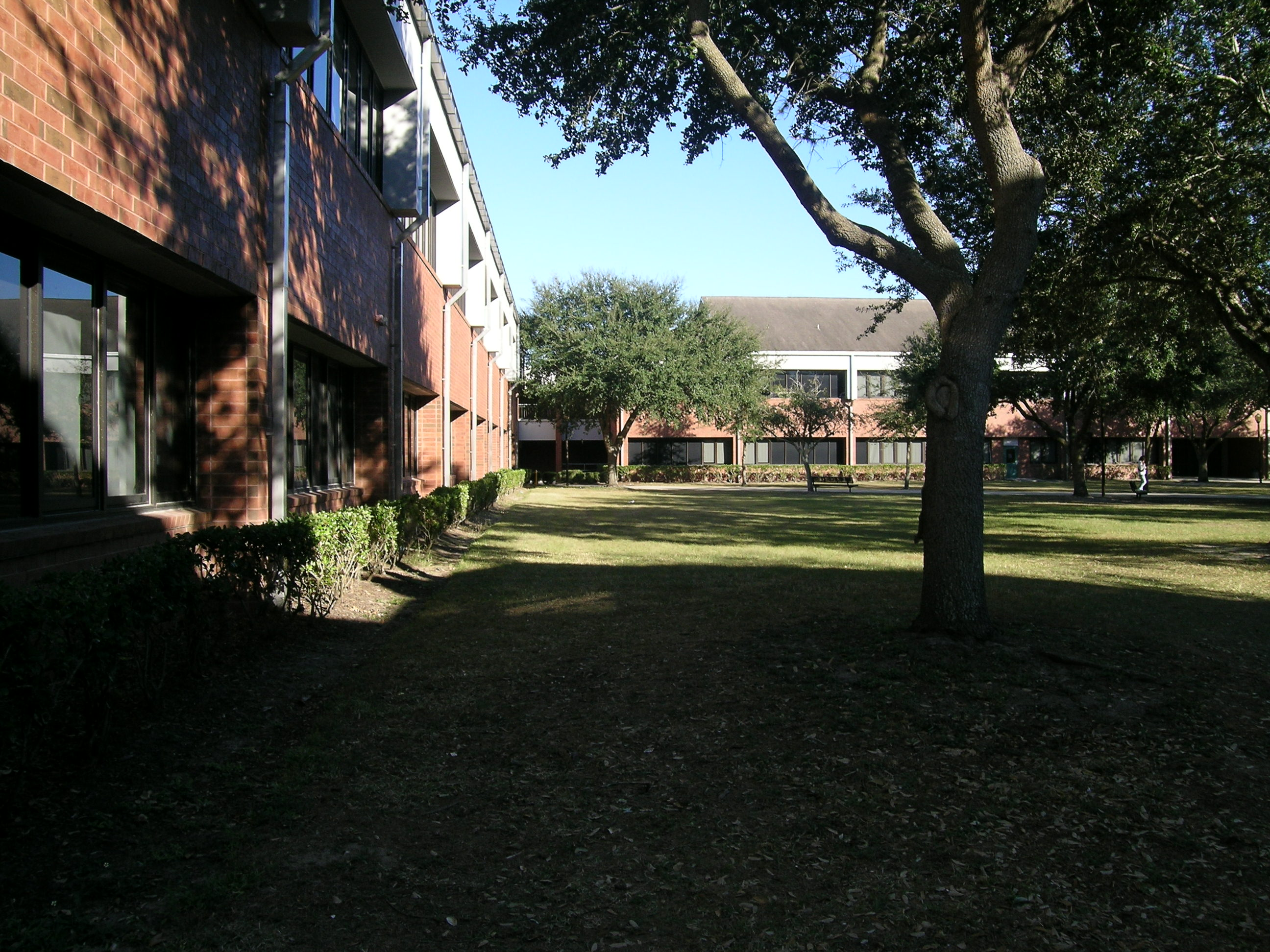
The courtyard in the center of the four primary buildings.

The school's principal is Tom Patton, a former administrator at the school. George Jenkins' administrative staff also consists of two assistant principals and five deans (of academics, athletics, attendance, and two of students).

Lake Region High School, in Winter Haven, FL, is modeled after George Jenkins.

2006 State of Florida Academic FCAT Performance Grade: B

2006 State of Florida Academic "Adequate Yearly Progress": Yes
