= Kelly Scott (American football) =

American football coach

Current position
- Title: Offensive coordinator & offensive line coach
- Team: Bluefield
- Conference: AAC

Biographical details
- Born: c. 1964 (age 61–62)

Playing career
- 1982–1984: Manchester
- Position: Defensive back

Coaching career (HC unless noted)
- 1986–1988: Speedway HS (IN) (assistant)
- 1989: Brebeuf Jesuit Prep (IN) (assistant)
- 1990–1992: Cathedral HS (IN) (assistant)
- 1993–1998: Lake Wales HS (FL) (DC)
- 1999: South Carolina (GA)
- 2000–2001: Lake Wales HS (FL) (DC)
- 2002–2005: Webber International (DC)
- 2006–2020: Webber International
- 2024–present: Bluefield (OC/OL)

Head coaching record
- Overall: 66–78

Kelly Scott is an American college football coach. He is the offensive coordinator and offensive line coach for Bluefield University, positions he has held since 2024. He was the head football at Webber International University located in Babson Park, Florida from 2006 to 2020. He was part of the inaugural coaching staff and was promoted from defensive coordinator to head coach in 2006.

== Head coaching record ==
Year	Team	Overall	Conference	Standing	Bowl/playoffs	NAIA^{#}
Webber International Warriors (NAIA independent) (2006–2013)
2006	Webber International	5–5				
2007	Webber International	3–6				
2008	Webber International	3–8				
2009	Webber International	3–6				
2010	Webber International	7–4				25
2011	Webber International	4–6				
2012	Webber International	4–6				
2013	Webber International	5–5				
Webber International Warriors (Sun Conference) (2014–2016)
2014	Webber International	7–3	4–1	1st		23
2015	Webber International	6–4	3–2	3rd		
2016	Webber International	4–4	2–2	3rd		
Webber International Warriors (Mid-South Conference) (2017–2020)
2017	Webber International	5–4	3–2	3rd (Sun)		
2018	Webber International	6–4	4–2	T–4th (Sun)		
2019	Webber International	3–6	2–4	T–4th (Sun)		
2020	Webber International	1–7	1–5	6th (Sun)		
Webber International:		66–78	19–18			
Total:		66–78				
National championship Conference title Conference division title or championship game berth
