= Florida State Road 620 =

State highway in Florida, United States

State Road 620

Route information
- Maintained by FDOT
- Length: 0.672 mi (1,081 m)

Major junctions
- South end: SR 540 near Winter Haven
- SR 655 in Winter Haven
- North end: SR 655 in Winter Haven

Location
- Country: United States
- State: Florida
- Counties: Polk

Highway system
- Florida State Highway System; Interstate; US; State; Former; Pre‑1945; Toll; Scenic
| ← SR 618A | → SR 636 |

State Road 620 (SR 620) is a 0.672-mile-long (1.081 km) state highway in Polk County, Florida, that runs from SR 540 just south of Winter Haven city limits to SR 655 and Avenue O Southwest in southwestern Winter Haven. The route is only signed for the first 0.410 miles (0.660 km), after which it is unsigned for its concurrency with SR 655.

== Route description ==
State Road 620 is a four-lane divided highway for almost its entire length. From its beginning at Florida State Road 540 the road is signed as a detour for Florida State Road 655 due to truck restrictions on the section of SR 655 along the southern shores of Lake Shipp. The road enters the Winter Haven City Limits at Cooley Road, and is given the name Recker Highway. At the next block, SR 620 is joined by the overlap with Florida State Road 655 at Lake Shipp Drive, but due to the truck restrictions along Lake Shipp Drive no signage for SR 655 exist until after the intersection with Avenue Q.

The divided section of SRs 620 and 655 ends north of Avenue P. Two other intersections north of there are Orangewood Avenue Southwest on the east side and Marshall Drive Southwest on the west side. Florida State Road 620 ends at the intersection with Avenue O, while Florida State Road 655 continues along Recker Highway through Jan Phyl Village and Auburndale.

== Major intersections ==
The entire route is in Polk County.

| Location | mi | km | Destinations | Notes |
|---|---|---|---|---|
| Eagle Lake | 0.000 | 0.000 | SR 540 (Winter Lake Road / Old 9 Foot Road) | Southern terminus |
| Winter Haven | 0.410 | 0.660 | SR 655 south (Lake Shipp Drive) | South end of SR 655 overlap |
| Winter Haven | 0.672 | 1.081 | SR 655 north (Recker Highway) / Avenue O Southwest | Northern terminus; north end of SR 655 overlap; continues beyond Avenue O Southwest as SR 655 |
1.000 mi = 1.609 km; 1.000 km = 0.621 mi: Concurrency terminus
