= Niekro =

Niekro is the surname of several people, most notably a family of American baseball players, all of whom have played in Major League Baseball:

- Phil Niekro (1939–2020), pitcher; member of the Baseball Hall of Fame and older brother of:
- Joe Niekro (1944–2006), pitcher; also father of:
- Lance Niekro (born 1979), first baseman
