= Crooked Lake (Florida) =

Lake in United States

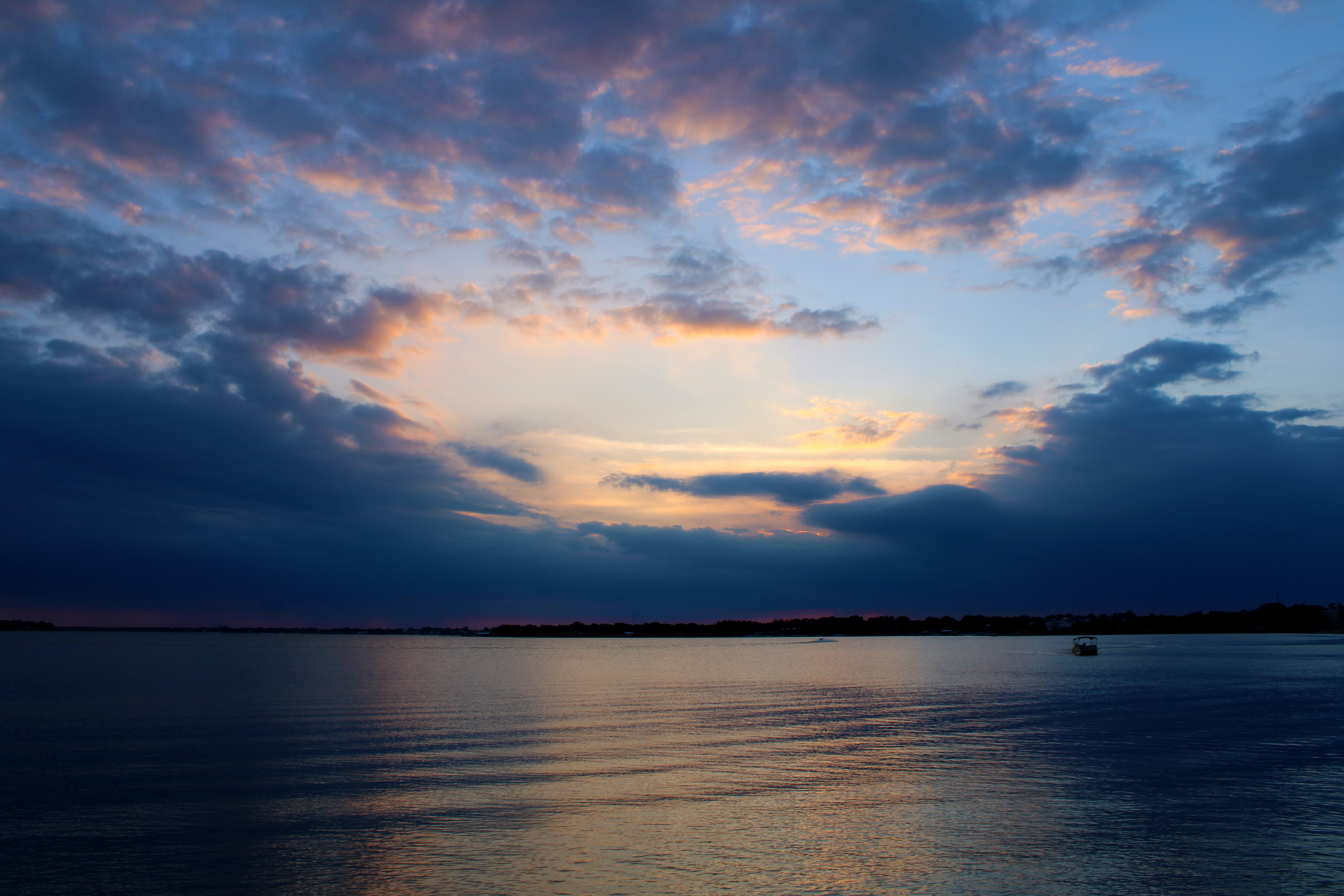
- Crooked Lake at twilight.

- Location within Florida Location within the United States
- Location: Polk County, Florida
- Coordinates: 27°48′55″N 81°34′00″W
- Primary outflows: Kissimmee River
- Basin countries: United States
- Surface area: 4,274 acres (17.30 km^{2})
- Average depth: 13 ft (4.0 m)
- Max. depth: 45 ft (14 m)
- Water volume: 21,649,953,572 US gallons (82.0×10^{6} m^{3})
- Settlements: Hillcrest Heights, Babson Park and Crooked Lake Park, Florida

Crooked Lake is a State registered Outstanding Florida Water that is located in southeast Polk County, Florida, United States. The lake is located west of Babson Park, north and west of Hillcrest Heights and east of Crooked Lake Park. Webber International University is beached on the waterfront. Crooked Lake is one of the largest lakes in Polk County both in terms of area and total volume with a maximum depth of 45 feet (14 m) and over 21.6 billion US gallons (82×10^{6} m^{3}) of water. Originally known as Caloosa Lake by some local indigenous tribes, it is located on the Lake Wales Ridge, one of the highest areas in peninsula Florida.
