= Hillcrest Heights =

Hillcrest Heights may refer to places in the United States:

- Hillcrest Heights, Florida
- Hillcrest Heights, Maryland
