= Kelly Scott (disambiguation) =

Kelly Scott (born 1977) is a Canadian curler.

Kelly, Kelley or Kelli Scott may also refer to:

- Kelly Scott (American football), head football coach of Webber International University since 2006
- Kelly Scott, presenter on Real Radio XS (Digital)
- Kellii Scott, drummer with the bands Failure and Enemy
- Kelley Scott (born c. 1980), Miss Oklahoma in 2003

== See also ==
- Scott Kelly (disambiguation)
