= Scott Kelly =

Scott Kelly may refer to:

- Scott Kelly (astronaut) (born 1964), American astronaut
- Scott Kelly (musician) (born 1967), American musician
- Scott Kelly (politician) (1927–2005), American politician

== See also ==
- Kelly Scott (disambiguation)
