= Highland City, Florida =

- Census-designated place
- Location in Polk County and the state of Florida
- Coordinates: 27°57′50″N 81°52′26″W
- Country: United States
- State: Florida
- County: Polk

Area
  - Total: 7.91 sq mi (20.48 km^{2})
  - Land: 7.88 sq mi (20.42 km^{2})
  - Water: 0.019 sq mi (0.05 km^{2})
- Elevation: 121 ft (37 m)

Population (2020)
  - Total: 12,355
  - Density: 1,566.8/sq mi (604.96/km^{2})
- Time zone: UTC-5 (Eastern (EST))
  - Summer (DST): UTC-4 (EDT)
- ZIP code33846: 33812
- Area code: 863
- FIPS code: 12-30225
- GNIS feature ID: 2402584

Highland City is a census-designated place (CDP) in Polk County, Florida, United States. As of the 2020 census, Highland City had a population of 12,355. It is part of the Lakeland–Winter Haven Metropolitan Statistical Area.

== History ==
The modern-day area of Highland City was the site of the United States Army's Fort Fraser, established in 1837 during its war with the Seminole Indians. Zachary Taylor, former U.S. President, commanded the fort for a short period. Fort Fraser was abandoned shortly after its construction.

In 1885, the Pemberton Ferry Branch of the South Florida Railroad was completed between Lakeland and Bartow. The area now known as Highland City was the only stop between the two larger cities. The stop, and eventual village, was named for the Haskell brothers, who were early investors in the South Florida Railroad. E. B. Haskell was a newspaper publisher from Boston, Massachusetts and his brother Dr. C. C. Haskell, of Maitland, Florida, was an original stakeholder in the South Florida Railroad. In addition to the town of Haskell, the South Florida Railroad's #6 locomotive was named the E. B. Haskell.

The Haskell freight depot was built by the railroad company along the roadway that would later become U.S. Highway 98. (In 1958, the depot was demolished due to its proximity to the roadway, and was replaced by a new freight building). The first postmaster (and also the first freight agent of the depot) in Haskell, Thomas A. Goode, was appointed on February 9, 1887.

Developer W. F. Hallam had begun to develop the Lakeland Highlands area by 1924. Hallam built the Hallam Country Clubhouse in the area west of Highland City and the road accessing the clubhouse became known as Clubhouse Road. The development of the Highlands also brought an influx of new residents to the Haskell community.

In 1925, the community of Haskell was incorporated by the Florida legislature, which also had the effect of officially changing the community's name to Highlands City. The city elected its first officials:

Title	Office Holder(s)
Mayor	O. H. Stringer
City Clerk and Treasurer	W. A. Womble
City Marshall	N. A. Winn
City Assessor	J. A. Williams
Councilmen	J. S. A. Walker, C. C. Moon, T. L. Frentress, C. E. Morris, and E. F. Miller

By 1927, the town's official area was reduced due to a lawsuit brought on behalf of a few Highland City landowners. This ended the town's short stint as an incorporated place.

== Name ==
A common error in referring to this place is to add an 'S' to the end of "Highland", causing the name to incorrectly read "Highlands City". For example, a new train depot, constructed in 1958, originally featured a sign with the mistakenly spelled "Highlands City" name. Lakeland Ledger reporter Courtland Anderson made special note of the error in the caption of his photo of the new depot.

When the community was briefly incorporated in the 1920s, the plural form was used.

== Modern community ==
The Highland City Volunteer Fire Department (HCVFD) works in conjunction with the Polk County Fire Department to provide fire protection for the Highland City area. For many years, HCVFD operated the fire service in Highland City on a completely volunteer basis. In the last quarter of the 20th century, Polk County consolidated many of its fire districts, and the Highland City fire station became an official Polk County Fire Station, under command of the Fire Chief of Polk County.

As of 1996, the Highland City community had organized an active community group. The group's goals included beautification, utility upgrades and safer neighborhoods.

On December 9, 2006, the community saw the grand opening of the Fort Fraser Trail, a 7.75-mile pedestrian and bicycle trail extending from the Polk State College campus south to Bartow.

== Geography ==
According to the United States Census Bureau, the CDP has a total area of 0.8 square miles (2.1 km^{2}), all land.

Highland City's street addresses put them on the Lakeland street grid; most street names have "SE" in their name, indicating that they are southeast of Lakeland's "point zero" intersection of Florida Avenue and Main Street. However, Highland City is often considered to be culturally closer to Bartow than Lakeland. Highland City Elementary, primarily feeds into Bartow Middle School and Bartow High School. Unlike its nearest neighbor, Lakeland Highlands, which is somewhat affluent, Highland City is a working class area with many mobile homes.

The Highland City census designated place is located on U.S. Highway 98, northwest of Bartow and east of Lakeland Highlands. The approximate limits of the Highland City census designated place are County Road 540A to the south, Clubhouse Road to the North, Strickland Avenue to the west, and 1st Street SE to the east.

== Demographics ==
Historical population
Census	Pop.	Note	%±
2020	12,355		—
U.S. Decennial Census

=== 2020 census ===
As of the 2020 census, Highland City had a population of 12,355. The median age was 38.5 years. 24.2% of residents were under the age of 18 and 13.8% of residents were 65 years of age or older. For every 100 females there were 99.3 males, and for every 100 females age 18 and over there were 96.2 males age 18 and over.

94.1% of residents lived in urban areas, while 5.9% lived in rural areas.

There were 4,448 households in Highland City, of which 35.0% had children under the age of 18 living in them. Of all households, 56.7% were married-couple households, 13.5% were households with a male householder and no spouse or partner present, and 23.1% were households with a female householder and no spouse or partner present. About 18.5% of all households were made up of individuals and 7.0% had someone living alone who was 65 years of age or older.

There were 4,727 housing units, of which 5.9% were vacant. The homeowner vacancy rate was 2.0% and the rental vacancy rate was 7.9%.

Racial composition as of the 2020 census
Race	Number	Percent
White	8,411	68.1%
Black or African American	1,188	9.6%
American Indian and Alaska Native	32	0.3%
Asian	507	4.1%
Native Hawaiian and Other Pacific Islander	2	0.0%
Some other race	674	5.5%
Two or more races	1,541	12.5%
Hispanic or Latino (of any race)	2,232	18.1%

=== 2000 census ===
As of the 2000 census, there were 2,051 people, 766 households, and 562 families residing in the CDP. The population density was 2,474.7 inhabitants per square mile (955.5/km^{2}). There were 818 housing units at an average density of 987.0 per square mile (381.1/km^{2}). The racial makeup of the CDP was 83.72% White, 10.24% African American, 0.54% Native American, 0.98% Asian, 0.05% Pacific Islander, 3.90% from other races, and 0.59% from two or more races. Hispanic or Latino of any race were 13.12% of the population.

There were 766 households, out of which 43.1% had children under the age of 18 living with them, 48.4% were married couples living together, 20.0% had a female householder with no husband present, and 26.6% were non-families. 22.3% of all households were made up of individuals, and 6.8% had someone living alone who was 65 years of age or older. The average household size was 2.68 and the average family size was 3.13.

In the CDP, the population was spread out, with 33.3% under the age of 18, 7.8% from 18 to 24, 32.8% from 25 to 44, 17.5% from 45 to 64, and 8.7% who were 65 years of age or older. The median age was 30 years. For every 100 females, there were 91.9 males. For every 100 females age 18 and over, there were 83.8 males.

The median income for a household in the CDP was $31,823, and the median income for a family was $36,250. Males had a median income of $26,833 versus $21,038 for females. The per capita income for the CDP was $13,925. About 9.5% of families and 13.5% of the population were below the poverty line, including 19.9% of those under age 18 and 15.5% of those age 65 or over.

== See also ==
- Fort Fraser
