= Fuller Heights, Florida =

- Census-designated place
- Location within Florida Location within the United States
- Coordinates: 27°54′33″N 81°59′53″W
- Country: United States
- State: Florida
- County: Polk

Area
  - Total: 4.64 sq mi (12.01 km^{2})
  - Land: 4.32 sq mi (11.19 km^{2})
  - Water: 0.32 sq mi (0.82 km^{2})
- Elevation: 112 ft (34 m)

Population (2020)
  - Total: 10,467
  - Density: 2,423.2/sq mi (935.59/km^{2})
- Time zone: UTC-5 (Eastern (EST))
  - Summer (DST): UTC-4 (EDT)
- ZIP code: 33860
- Area code: 863
- GNIS feature ID: 282852

Fuller Heights is an unincorporated community and census-designated place in Polk County, Florida, United States. Its population was 10,467 as of the 2020 census.

== Geography ==
According to the U.S. Census Bureau, the community has an area of 5.243 square miles (13.58 km^{2}); 4.866 square miles (12.60 km^{2}) of its area is land, and 0.377 square miles (0.98 km^{2}) is water.

== Demographics ==
Historical population
Census	Pop.	Note	%±
2020	10,467		—
U.S. Decennial Census

Fuller heights first appeared as a census designated place in the 2010 U.S. census.

=== 2020 census ===
As of the 2020 census, Fuller Heights had a population of 10,467. The median age was 36.5 years. 26.2% of residents were under the age of 18 and 14.5% of residents were 65 years of age or older. For every 100 females there were 95.1 males, and for every 100 females age 18 and over there were 93.1 males age 18 and over.

98.7% of residents lived in urban areas, while 1.3% lived in rural areas.

There were 3,689 households in Fuller Heights, of which 37.2% had children under the age of 18 living in them. Of all households, 53.6% were married-couple households, 15.0% were households with a male householder and no spouse or partner present, and 22.6% were households with a female householder and no spouse or partner present. About 22.0% of all households were made up of individuals and 9.0% had someone living alone who was 65 years of age or older.

There were 3,969 housing units, of which 7.1% were vacant. The homeowner vacancy rate was 1.9% and the rental vacancy rate was 13.4%.

Racial composition as of the 2020 census
Race	Number	Percent
White	6,811	65.1%
Black or African American	1,057	10.1%
American Indian and Alaska Native	76	0.7%
Asian	185	1.8%
Native Hawaiian and Other Pacific Islander	5	0.0%
Some other race	962	9.2%
Two or more races	1,371	13.1%
Hispanic or Latino (of any race)	2,675	25.6%
