= Highland Park, Florida =

- Village
- Location in Polk County and the state of Florida
- Coordinates: 27°51′41″N 81°33′43″W
- Country: United States
- State: Florida
- County: Polk
- Founded: 1919
- Incorporated: 1927
- Named after: Highland Park, Illinois

Government
  - Type: Mayor-Commission
  - Mayor: Brandon McWhorter
  - Commissioners: Derek Camann and Amanda Updike
  - Village Manager: Ric Busbee
  - Village Clerk: Blair Updike
  - Village Treasurer: Mary Bradley

Area
  - Total: 1.09 sq mi (2.83 km^{2})
  - Land: 0.55 sq mi (1.42 km^{2})
  - Water: 0.54 sq mi (1.41 km^{2})
- Elevation: 105 ft (32 m)

Population (2020)
  - Total: 251
  - Density: 458.9/sq mi (177.18/km^{2})
- Time zone: UTC-5 (Eastern (EST))
  - Summer (DST): UTC-4 (EDT)
- ZIP code: 33898
- Area code: 863
- FIPS code: 12-30325
- GNIS feature ID: 2407476
- Website: www.highlandpark-fl.org

Highland Park is a village in Polk County, Florida, United States. Highland Park is part of the Lakeland–Winter Haven Metropolitan Statistical Area. Its population was 251 at the 2020 US census.

== Geography ==
According to the United States Census Bureau, the village has a total area of 0.7 square miles (1.8 km^{2}), of which 0.4 square miles (1.0 km^{2}) is land and 0.3 square miles (0.78 km^{2}) (37.50%) is water.

=== Climate ===
The climate in this area is characterized by hot, humid summers and generally mild winters. According to the Köppen climate classification, the Village of Highland Park has a humid subtropical climate zone (Cfa).

== Demographics ==
Historical population
Census	Pop.	Note	%±
1940	75		—
1950	52		−30.7%
1960	94		80.8%
1970	88		−6.4%
1980	184		109.1%
1990	155		−15.8%
2000	244		57.4%
2010	230		−5.7%
2020	251		9.1%
U.S. Decennial Census

=== 2010 and 2020 census ===
Highland Park racial composition (Hispanics excluded from racial categories) (NH = Non-Hispanic)
Race	Pop 2010	Pop 2020	% 2010	% 2020
White (NH)	201	200	87.39%	79.68%
Black or African American (NH)	7	4	3.04%	1.59%
Native American or Alaska Native (NH)	0	0	0.00%	0.00%
Asian (NH)	0	10	0.00%	3.98%
Pacific Islander or Native Hawaiian (NH)	0	1	0.00%	0.40%
Some other race (NH)	0	0	0.00%	0.00%
Two or more races/Multiracial (NH)	3	10	1.30%	3.98%
Hispanic or Latino (any race)	19	26	8.26%	10.36%
Total	230	251		

As of the 2020 United States census, there were 251 people, 83 households, and 52 families residing in the village.

As of the 2010 United States census, there were 230 people, 107 households, and 81 families residing in the village.

=== 2000 census ===
At the 2000 census, there were 244 people, 112 households and 73 families residing in the village. The population density was 544.2 inhabitants per square mile (210.1/km^{2}). There were 174 housing units at an average density of 388.1 per square mile (149.8/km^{2}). The racial makeup of the village was 94.26% White, 0.82% African American, 3.69% Asian, and 1.23% from two or more races. Hispanic or Latino of any race were 0.82% of the population.

In 2000, there were 112 households, of which 18.8% had children under the age of 18 living with them, 62.5% were married couples living together, 0.9% had a female householder with no husband present, and 34.8% were non-families. 31.3% of all households were made up of individuals, and 19.6% had someone living alone who was 65 years of age or older. The average household size was 2.18 and the average family size was 2.70.

In 2000, 16.8% of the population were under the age of 18, 6.1% from 18 to 24, 18.4% from 25 to 44, 26.2% from 45 to 64, and 32.4% who were 65 years of age or older. The median age was 51 years. For every 100 females, there were 90.6 males. For every 100 females age 18 and over, there were 84.5 males.

In 2000, the median household income was $41,875 and the median family income was $56,667. Males had a median income of $43,333 vand females $18,750. The per capita income was $30,097. None of the families and 3.9% of the population were living below the poverty line.

== Transportation ==
- State Road 17 – The Scenic Highway two miles west of the village, leading northward to Lake Wales and southward to Hillcrest Heights and Frostproof.
- US 27 – A four-lane divided highway four miles west.
