= Hillcrest Heights, Florida =

Town in the state of Florida, United States

- Town
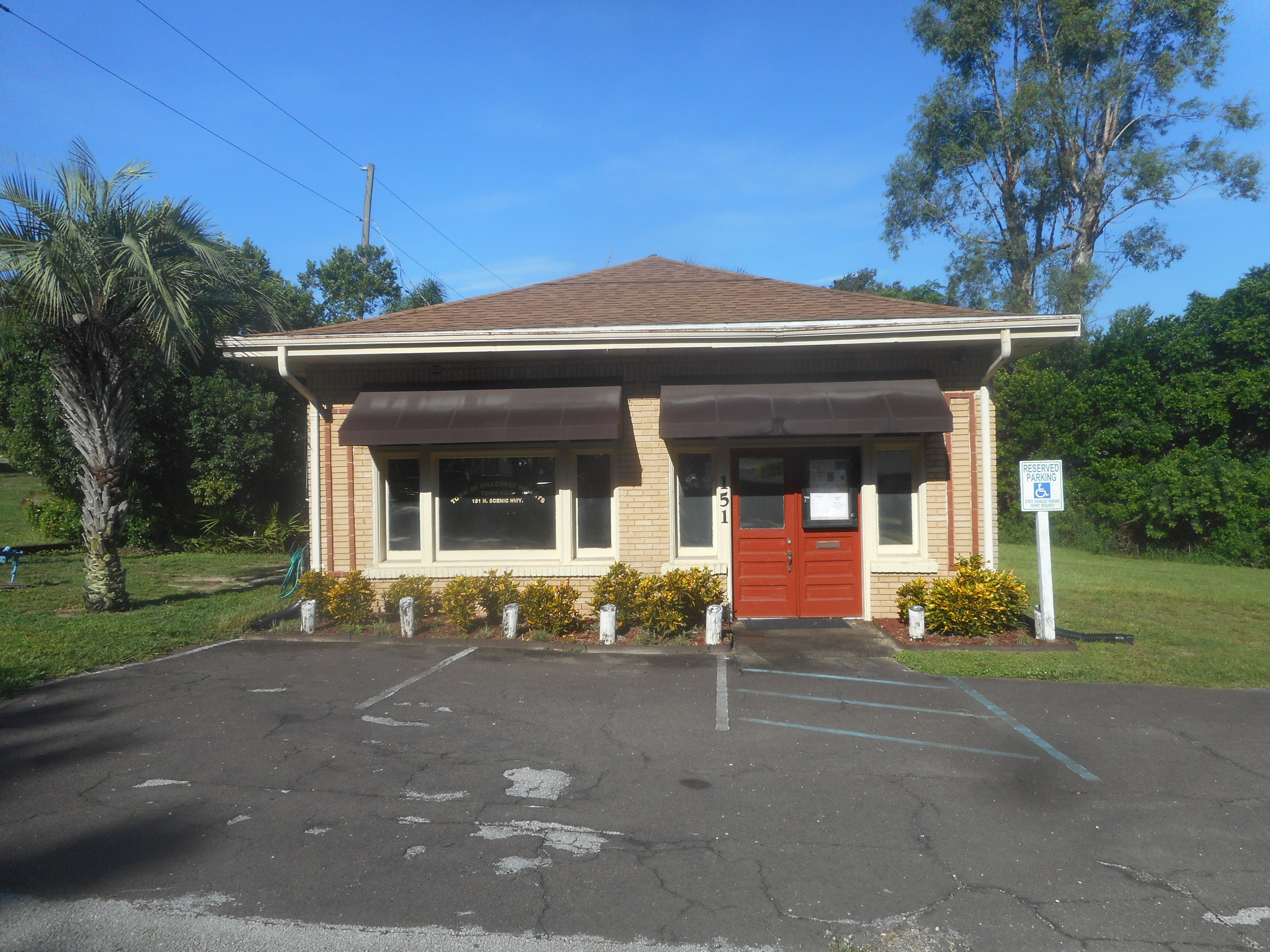
- Hillcrest Heights Town Hall on Scenic Route 17

- Seal
- Motto: "A Neighborly Florida Town"
- Location in Polk County and the state of Florida
- Coordinates: 27°49′42″N 81°32′43″W
- Country: United States
- State: Florida
- County: Polk
- Founded: 1917
- Incorporated: November 20, 1923

Government
  - Type: Mayor-Commission
  - Mayor: Michael "Mike" Bishop
  - Vice Mayor: Sam Knight
  - Commissioners: Jason Harmeling, Richard "Rick" Lee, and Tom Harmeling
  - Town Clerk: Deborah D. Brewner

Area
  - Total: 8.70 sq mi (22.53 km^{2})
  - Land: 0.16 sq mi (0.41 km^{2})
  - Water: 8.54 sq mi (22.11 km^{2})
- Elevation: 118 ft (36 m)

Population (2020)
  - Total: 243
  - Density: 1,521.7/sq mi (587.52/km^{2})
- Time zone: UTC-5 (Eastern (EST))
  - Summer (DST): UTC-4 (EDT)
- ZIP code: 33827
- Area code: 863
- FIPS code: 12-30700
- GNIS feature ID: 2405836
- Website: http://www.townofhillcrestheights.com/

Hillcrest Heights is a town in Polk County, Florida, United States. Hillcrest Heights is part of the Lakeland–Winter Haven Metropolitan Statistical Area. The population was 243 at the 2020 census.

== History ==
In 1917, the Lakeside Club was built on the south shore of Crooked Lake. A year later, this club burnt to the ground and was rebuilt and named the Hillcrest Lodge. This lodge was well known and many celebrities stayed there including Bobby Jones, Babe Ruth and William Jennings Bryan.

In 1923, the Town of Hillcrest Heights was officially incorporated as a municipality. A year later, the town's dirt roads were all paved.

== Geography ==
Hillcrest Heights is located just south of Babson Park and east of Crooked Lake. The town is approximately nine miles south of Lake Wales and five miles (8 km) north of Frostproof. Hillcrest Heights is located within the Central Florida highlands area of the Atlantic coastal plain with a terrain consisting of flatland interspersed with gently rolling hills.

According to the United States Census Bureau, the town has a total area of 0.2 square miles (0.52 km^{2}), all land.

=== Climate ===
The climate in this area is characterized by hot, humid summers and generally mild winters. According to the Köppen climate classification, the Town of Hillcrest Heights has a humid subtropical climate zone (Cfa).

== Government ==
Hillcrest Heights has a town council made up of five members including a mayor and vice mayor. The town does not have a city manager and is responsible for the day-to-day operations of the town. Police services are contracted through the Polk County Sheriffs Office Department. The town's annual operating budget is less than $100,000. In the most recent 2009 elections, only the incumbent commissioners qualified and were elected by default.

=== Annexations ===
Although the town is only 107 acres (0.43 km^{2}), the residents and government of Hillcrest Heights have been aggressive in keeping the status quo in the town. Because of encroaching annexations by the City of Frostproof, the town is exploring the possibility of annexing Crooked Lake and nearby shores which would increase the size of the town to 6.7 miles (10.8 km). Although the annexation would not increase the population of Hillcrest Heights, it would help stop development of nearby areas. Many residents of adjacent census-designated place (CDP) of Babson Park, with a population of over 1,000, are also fearful of the Frostproof annexations, and the Babson Park Visioning Group is considering either incorporating the CDP or asking for annexation by Hillcrest Heights.

== Demographics ==
Historical population
Census	Pop.	Note	%±
1930	71		—
1940	96		35.2%
1950	91		−5.2%
1960	138		51.6%
1970	154		11.6%
1980	177		14.9%
1990	221		24.9%
2000	266		20.4%
2010	254		−4.5%
2020	243		−4.3%
U.S. Decennial Census

=== 2010 and 2020 census ===
Hillcrest Heights racial composition (Hispanics excluded from racial categories) (NH = Non-Hispanic)
Race	Pop 2010	Pop 2020	% 2010	% 2020
White (NH)	231	199	90.94%	81.89%
Black or African American (NH)	7	5	2.76%	2.06%
Native American or Alaska Native (NH)	1	0	0.39%	0.00%
Asian (NH)	0	0	0.00%	0.00%
Pacific Islander or Native Hawaiian (NH)	0	0	0.00%	0.00%
Some other race (NH)	0	1	0.00%	0.41%
Two or more races/Multiracial (NH)	0	6	0.00%	2.47%
Hispanic or Latino (any race)	15	32	5.91%	13.17%
Total	254	243	100.00%	100.00%

As of the 2020 United States census, there were 243 people, 102 households, and 81 families residing in the town.

As of the 2010 United States census, there were 254 people, 103 households, and 93 families residing in the town.

=== 2000 census ===
As of the census of 2000, there were 266 people, 99 households, and 75 families residing in the town. The population density was 1,640.3 inhabitants per square mile (633.3/km^{2}). There were 138 housing units at an average density of 851.0 per square mile (328.6/km^{2}). The racial makeup of the town was 96.62% White, 1.88% African American, 0.75% Asian, and 0.75% from two or more races. Hispanic or Latino of any race were 1.88% of the population.

In 2000, there were 99 households, out of which 36.4% had children under the age of 18 living with them, 68.7% were married couples living together, 4.0% had a female householder with no husband present, and 24.2% were non-families. 20.2% of all households were made up of individuals, and 12.1% had someone living alone who was 65 years of age or older. The average household size was 2.69 and the average family size was 3.15.

In 2000, in the town, the population was spread out, with 25.6% under the age of 18, 5.3% from 18 to 24, 27.1% from 25 to 44, 24.8% from 45 to 64, and 17.3% who were 65 years of age or older. The median age was 40 years. For every 100 females, there were 92.8 males. For every 100 females age 18 and over, there were 98.0 males.

In 2000, the median income for a household in the town was $60,556, and the median income for a family was $62,143. Males had a median income of $40,833 versus $33,125 for females. The per capita income for the town was $20,802. About 2.9% of families and 1.5% of the population were below the poverty line, including none of those under the age of eighteen and 5.7% of those 65 or over.

== Media ==
Hillcrest Heights is part of the Tampa/St. Pete television market, the 13th largest in the country and part of the local Lakeland/Winter Haven radio market, which is the 94th largest in the country.

== Transportation ==
- State Road 17 – The Scenic Highway going through the center of town, leading northward to Highland Park and Lake Wales, and southward to Frostproof.
- US 27 – A divided highway six miles (10 km) west of town.

== Education ==
There are no public schools in Hillcrest Heights, though all of them are served by Polk County Public Schools. Generally students will attend elementary school at nearby Babson Park Elementary, and then go on to Frostproof Middle-Senior High School or take advantage of the Lake Wales charter school system.

Warner University is a few miles west of town.
