= Tampa Bay Watershed =

Watershed of Florida, U.S.

The Tampa Bay Watershed is the 6,410 sq mi (16,600 km^{2}) Florida area which drains to Tampa Bay on the Gulf of Mexico, including the area draining from Gasparilla Pass and the watershed of Hillsborough Bay. The city of Tampa and the southern portion of the metropolitan Tampa Bay Area are within the watershed.
