= Webber International Warriors =

Coordinates: 27.8398°N 81.5359°W

- University: Webber International University
- Association: NAIA
- Conference: The Sun (primary)
- Athletic director: Brad Niethammer
- Location: Babson Park, Florida
- Varsity teams: 17 (9 men's, 6 women's, 2 co-ed)
- Football stadium: Warrior Turf Field
- Basketball arena: Sabbagh Athletic Center
- Baseball stadium: Brad Niethammer Field
- Softball stadium: Nancy Nichols Field
- Soccer stadium: Warrior Grass Field
- Lacrosse stadium: Warrior Turf Field
- Tennis venue: Webber Campus Tennis Courts
- Nickname: Warriors
- Colors: Forest Green and White
- Website: webberathletics.com
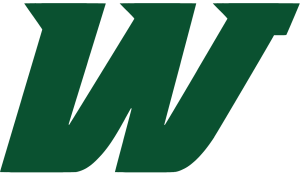

The Webber International Warriors are the athletic teams that represent Webber International University (WIU), located in Babson Park, Florida, in intercollegiate sports as a member of the National Association of Intercollegiate Athletics (NAIA), primarily competing in the Sun Conference (formerly known as the Florida Sun Conference (FSC) until after the 2007–08 school year) for most of its sports since the 1990–91 academic year.

Its football team formerly competed in the Mid-South Conference (MSC) until after the 2021 fall season. They are also a member of the National Christian College Athletic Association (NCCAA), primarily competing as an independent in the South Region of the Division I level.

== Varsity teams ==
Webber International competes in 17 intercollegiate varsity sports.

Men's sports	Women's sports
Baseball	Basketball
Basketball	Beach volleyball
Beach volleyball	Flag football
Bowling	Soccer
Football	Softball
Golf	Volleyball
Lacrosse	
Soccer	
Volleyball	
Co-ed sports
Bowling
Weightlifting

=== Basketball ===
Basketball was started in the 2006–2007 season, after the hiring of Rollie Massimino in 2005, as Director of Basketball Operations for both men's and women's basketball. Per ESPN, on December 14, 2016, Massimino, Keiser University's men's basketball coach, became the third active coach to achieve 800 career wins and the ninth coach overall. Massimino was 82 years old at the time.

=== Bowling ===
With the backing of the world-famous Kegel Training Center in Lake Wales, Florida, Webber's bowling program has become one of the most successful in the United States. The men's program began in the 2008–2009 season, with a women's program added in the 2009–2010 season. The team has advanced to the national championship tournament in every season in program history.

The women's team won the 2010 intercollegiate team championship of the United States Bowling Congress (USBC), held in El Paso, Texas, in its first year as a program. The final was aired on ESPN2 on May 5, 2010. The women's team followed this feat by winning two more USBC national titles in 2012 and 2016.

In the 2010–2011 season, the men's team was ranked # 1 for the entire season by the Bowling Writers Association of America and the National Collegiate Bowling Coaches Association (NCBCA). However, at that year's intercollegiate championship tournament in Columbus, Georgia, the team lost to Fresno State in the finals, which later were aired on ESPN2. In 2012 the men's team bounced back to win the USBC national championship. The team also won national USBC championships in 2017 and 2019, although the 2017 result was later vacated due to an ineligible player.

In 2009 in its first year as a program, the men's team finished as national semi-finalists, losing to the eventual national champion, Wichita State. Head Coach Slowinski was named the NCBCA National Coach of the Year in 2010, in addition to being a finalist in both 2009 and 2011.

=== Men's soccer ===
On October 27, 2010, the Warriors defeated local rivals Warner to win the Crooked Lake Cup and qualify for the 2010 Sun Conference regional tournament. Although the series was tied 2–2 on aggregate, Webber won the conference portion and therefore were awarded the trophy.

== Club teams ==
Club sports include bowling and weightlifting.
