= Lance Niekro =

American baseball player (born 1979)

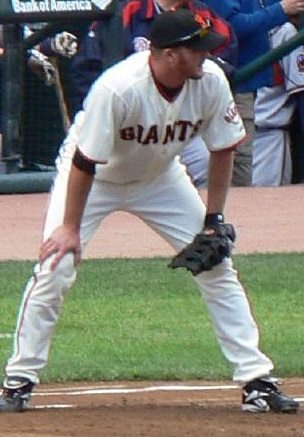
- Niekro with the San Francisco Giants in 2006
- First baseman
- Born: January 29, 1979 (age 47); Winter Haven, Florida, U.S.
- Batted: Right Threw: Right

MLB debut
- September 5, 2003, for the San Francisco Giants

Last MLB appearance
- May 2, 2007, for the San Francisco Giants

MLB statistics
- Batting average: .246
- Home runs: 17
- Runs batted in: 79
- Stats at Baseball Reference

Teams
- San Francisco Giants (2003, 2005–2007)

Lance William Niekro (/ˈniːkroʊ/ NEE-kroh; born January 29, 1979) is an American baseball coach and former first baseman, who played parts of four seasons for the San Francisco Giants in Major League Baseball (MLB) from 2003 to 2007. He played college baseball for the Florida Southern Moccasins. After his playing career concluded, he served as an assistant coach at Florida Southern, before being elevated to the head coach position on May 9, 2012, a position he held through the 2024 season. He is the son of MLB pitcher Joe Niekro and nephew of MLB pitcher Phil Niekro.

== Career ==
=== High School and College ===
Born in Winter Haven, Florida, Niekro graduated from George W. Jenkins High School in Lakeland, Florida, and attended Florida Southern College, playing for coach Chuck Anderson from 1999 to 2000. While in high school, he had transitioned from being a knuckleball pitcher to a position player, playing third base at Florida Southern. In 1999 and 2000, he played collegiate summer baseball for the Orleans Cardinals of the Cape Cod Baseball League (CCBL), and was named league MVP in 1999. He was inducted into the CCBL Hall of Fame in 2006.

=== San Francisco Giants ===
Niekro was selected by the San Francisco Giants in the second round of the 2000 Major League Baseball draft. He began his professional career as a third baseman, but moved to first base in the minor leagues due to injury. Niekro first reached the major leagues in 2003, but only had five at bats. He saw more substantial playing time in 2005, when he split time with J. T. Snow at first base and played in 113 games, finishing the season with a .252 batting average, 12 home runs, and 46 RBI in 278 at-bats.

Following the 2005 season, Snow and the Giants parted ways. As a result, Niekro was given his shot as the everyday first baseman, but was sent back down to the minors. During the 2006 season, his replacements were Mark Sweeney, Travis Ishikawa, Chad Santos and Shea Hillenbrand.

On May 4, 2007, the Giants designated Niekro for assignment and recalled Scott Munter from Triple-A Fresno. He was later optioned to the Fresno Grizzlies when no other team claimed him. He became a free agent after the season. Like his father and uncle, Niekro can throw a knuckleball, and was first allowed to pitch professionally for the Grizzlies in August 2007.

=== Houston Astros ===
On January 10, 2008, the Houston Astros signed Niekro to a minor league contract with an invitation to spring training. He was released on May 2, 2008 and retired, getting a job with a telecommunications company.

=== Atlanta Braves ===
On December 18, 2008, Niekro decided to make a comeback as a knuckleball pitcher and was signed by the Atlanta Braves to a minor league contract. He pitched one season in the Braves' system, appearing in 14 games for the Gulf Coast League Braves in 2009 before becoming a free agent at the end of the year.

=== Coaching career ===
In 2010, Niekro was named an assistant coach at Florida Southern. On May 9, 2012, Niekro succeeded Pete Meyer as the head coach of the Florida Southern Moccasins, a program that has produced the most NCAA Championships in Division II play (9).

In 11 seasons as head coach, he led Florida Southern to five NCAA tournament appearances, including a third place finish in 2018. He won ABCA Coach of the Year in 2018. After an 18–30 season in 2024, he was dismissed as head coach of the program and replaced by Rick O'Dette. Niekro subsequently took a coaching role at All Saints' Academy in Winter Haven, Florida.

== See also ==
- List of second-generation Major League Baseball players
