= Lakeland Highlands, Florida =

- Census-designated place
- Location in Polk County and the state of Florida
- Coordinates: 27°57′26″N 81°56′59″W
- Country: United States
- State: Florida
- County: Polk

Area
  - Total: 5.64 sq mi (14.61 km^{2})
  - Land: 4.86 sq mi (12.59 km^{2})
  - Water: 0.78 sq mi (2.01 km^{2})
- Elevation: 213 ft (65 m)

Population (2020)
  - Total: 12,187
  - Density: 2,506.3/sq mi (967.69/km^{2})
- Time zone: UTC-5 (Eastern (EST))
  - Summer (DST): UTC-4 (EDT)
- FIPS code: 12-38262
- GNIS feature ID: 2403209

Lakeland Highlands is an unincorporated community and census-designated place (CDP) in Polk County, Florida, United States. As of the 2020 census, Lakeland Highlands had a population of 12,187. It is part of the Lakeland–Winter Haven Metropolitan Statistical Area. It is an affluent residential community located south of the Lakeland city limits, and north of the Mulberry city limits. Lakeland Highlands neighbors Medulla, and together the two communities make up much of what is known as South Lakeland (unincorporated).

The area is addressed to Lakeland, with zip codes 33807, 33812, and 33813. Its schools include, George W. Jenkins Senior High School (named after the founder of Publix Super Markets, based in Lakeland), Scott Lake Elementary, Lakeland Highlands Middle School and Valleyview Elementary. This area has been experiencing high growth for over two decades with new subdivisions being developed every year.

Lakeland Highlands is included in broader definitions of the Tampa Bay area and is in the Tampa media market. The community is about 25 miles as the crow flies from the Tampa Bay.

== Geography ==
According to the United States Census Bureau, the CDP has a total area of 6.2 square miles (16 km^{2}), of which 5.6 square miles (15 km^{2}) is land and 0.6 square miles (1.6 km^{2}) (9.25%) is water.

Lakeland Highlands lies within the Tampa Bay watershed.

== Demographics ==
Historical population
Census	Pop.	Note	%±
1980	10,426		—
1990	9,972		−4.4%
2000	12,557		25.9%
2020	12,187		—

=== 2020 census ===
As of the 2020 census, Lakeland Highlands had a population of 12,187. The median age was 46.3 years. 21.2% of residents were under the age of 18 and 22.5% of residents were 65 years of age or older. For every 100 females there were 93.4 males, and for every 100 females age 18 and over there were 90.0 males age 18 and over.

100.0% of residents lived in urban areas, while 0.0% lived in rural areas.

There were 4,677 households in Lakeland Highlands, of which 30.0% had children under the age of 18 living in them. Of all households, 63.6% were married-couple households, 10.9% were households with a male householder and no spouse or partner present, and 20.5% were households with a female householder and no spouse or partner present. About 19.3% of all households were made up of individuals and 10.0% had someone living alone who was 65 years of age or older.

There were 4,917 housing units, of which 4.9% were vacant. The homeowner vacancy rate was 1.3% and the rental vacancy rate was 10.0%.

Racial composition as of the 2020 census
Race	Number	Percent
White	9,865	80.9%
Black or African American	449	3.7%
American Indian and Alaska Native	22	0.2%
Asian	317	2.6%
Native Hawaiian and Other Pacific Islander	2	0.0%
Some other race	267	2.2%
Two or more races	1,265	10.4%
Hispanic or Latino (of any race)	1,423	11.7%

=== 2000 census ===
As of the census of 2000, there were 12,557 people, 4,501 households, and 3,740 families residing in the CDP. The population density was 2,248.8 inhabitants per square mile (868.3/km^{2}). There were 4,748 housing units at an average density of 850.3 per square mile (328.3/km^{2}). The racial makeup of the CDP was 94.21% White, 2.47% African American, 0.20% Native American, 1.66% Asian, 0.02% Pacific Islander, 0.48% from other races, and 0.97% from two or more races. Hispanic or Latino of any race were 3.85% of the population.

There were 4,501 households, out of which 39.4% had children under the age of 18 living with them, 74.0% were married couples living together, 6.8% had a female householder with no husband present, and 16.9% were non-families. 14.2% of all households were made up of individuals, and 6.2% had someone living alone who was 65 years of age or older. The average household size was 2.79 and the average family size was 3.08.

In the CDP, the population was spread out, with 27.3% under the age of 18, 5.8% from 18 to 24, 24.7% from 25 to 44, 29.2% from 45 to 64, and 13.1% who were 65 years of age or older. The median age was 41 years. For every 100 females, there were 94.7 males. For every 100 females age 18 and over, there were 93.0 males.

The median income for a household in the CDP was $66,053, and the median income for a family was $71,176. Males had a median income of $50,714 versus $30,018 for females. The per capita income for the CDP was $31,122. About 2.1% of families and 3.3% of the population were below the poverty line, including 3.0% of those under age 18 and 3.7% of those age 65 or over.
