= Medulla, Florida =

- Census-designated place
- Location in Polk County and the state of Florida
- Coordinates: 27°57′15″N 82°00′05″W
- Country: United States
- State: Florida
- County: Polk

Area
  - Total: 5.65 sq mi (14.64 km^{2})
  - Land: 5.60 sq mi (14.50 km^{2})
  - Water: 0.054 sq mi (0.14 km^{2})
- Elevation: 118 ft (36 m)

Population (2020)
  - Total: 10,871
  - Density: 1,941.8/sq mi (749.74/km^{2})
- Time zone: UTC-5 (Eastern (EST))
  - Summer (DST): UTC-4 (EDT)
- Postal codes: 33811, 33813
- Area code: 863
- FIPS code: 12-43925
- GNIS feature ID: 2403274

Medulla is an unincorporated community and census-designated place (CDP) in western Polk County, Florida, United States. It is part of the Lakeland–Winter Haven Metropolitan Statistical Area. Medulla is an affluent residential community located south of the Lakeland city limits, and north of the Mulberry city limits. Medulla neighbors Lakeland Highlands, and together the two communities make up much of what is known as south (unincorporated) Lakeland. As of the 2020 census, Medulla had a population of 10,871. The area is addressed to Lakeland, with zip codes 33811 and 33813.

== Geography ==
According to the United States Census Bureau, the CDP has a total area of 5.7 square miles (15 km^{2}), of which 5.7 square miles (15 km^{2}) is land and 0.04 square miles (0.10 km^{2}) (0.35%) is water.

== History ==
A post office was established at Medulla in 1881, and remained in operation until 1909. Before the post office opened, the community was called Spring Hill. The name Medulla was given to the area due to its connecting link on the stagecoach rail-line between Bartow and Fort Meade, similar to how the medulla oblongata (in the lower part of the brain) connects with spinal cord. Medulla saw a period of rapid growth throughout the 1990s and early 2000s with development of Deer Brooke, a mega deed restricted community. Development of many other smaller subdivisions soon followed.

== Demographics ==
Historical population
Census	Pop.	Note	%±
2020	10,871		—
U.S. Decennial Census

=== 2020 census ===
As of the 2020 census, Medulla had a population of 10,871. The median age was 36.8 years. 24.3% of residents were under the age of 18 and 14.0% of residents were 65 years of age or older. For every 100 females there were 91.9 males, and for every 100 females age 18 and over there were 89.3 males age 18 and over.

100.0% of residents lived in urban areas, while 0.0% lived in rural areas.

There were 4,134 households in Medulla, of which 34.0% had children under the age of 18 living in them. Of all households, 49.6% were married-couple households, 15.7% were households with a male householder and no spouse or partner present, and 27.3% were households with a female householder and no spouse or partner present. About 22.3% of all households were made up of individuals and 6.7% had someone living alone who was 65 years of age or older.

There were 4,333 housing units, of which 4.6% were vacant. The homeowner vacancy rate was 0.8% and the rental vacancy rate was 4.9%.

Racial composition as of the 2020 census
Race	Number	Percent
White	7,046	64.8%
Black or African American	1,521	14.0%
American Indian and Alaska Native	25	0.2%
Asian	163	1.5%
Native Hawaiian and Other Pacific Islander	1	0.0%
Some other race	758	7.0%
Two or more races	1,357	12.5%
Hispanic or Latino (of any race)	2,240	20.6%

=== 2000 census ===
As of the 2000 census, there were 6,637 people, 2,567 households, and 1,791 families residing in the CDP. The population density was 1,169.3 inhabitants per square mile (451.5/km^{2}). There were 2,739 housing units at an average density of 482.6 units per square mile (186.3 units/km^{2}). The racial makeup of the CDP was 84.53% White, 11.65% African American, 0.03% Native American, 0.62% Asian, 0.02% Pacific Islander, 1.82% from other races, and 1.34% from two or more races. Hispanic or Latino of any race were 5.20% of the population.

There were 2,567 households, out of which 35.6% had children under the age of 18 living with them, 55.6% were married couples living together, 11.1% had a female householder with no husband present, and 30.2% were non-families. 23.9% of all households were made up of individuals, and 4.8% had someone living alone who was 65 years of age or older. The average household size was 2.58 and the average family size was 3.06.

In the CDP, the population was spread out, with 26.4% under the age of 18, 9.7% from 18 to 24, 33.6% from 25 to 44, 22.0% from 45 to 64, and 8.3% who were 65 years of age or older. The median age was 34 years. For every 100 females, there were 99.7 males. For every 100 females age 18 and over, there were 97.3 males.

The median income for a household in the CDP was $45,460, and the median income for a family was $51,691. Males had a median income of $35,698 versus $26,341 for females. The per capita income for the CDP was $21,459. 6.0% of the population and 4.2% of families were below the poverty line. Out of the total population, 4.0% of those under the age of 18 and 7.4% of those 65 and older were living below the poverty line.
