= Jan Phyl Village, Florida =

- Census-designated place
- Location in Polk County and the state of Florida
- Coordinates: 28°01′12″N 81°47′36″W
- Country: United States
- State: Florida
- County: Polk

Area
  - Total: 4.72 sq mi (12.22 km^{2})
  - Land: 4.58 sq mi (11.85 km^{2})
  - Water: 0.14 sq mi (0.37 km^{2})
- Elevation: 115 ft (35 m)

Population (2020)
  - Total: 5,927
  - Density: 1,295.7/sq mi (500.28/km^{2})
- Time zone: UTC-5 (Eastern (EST))
  - Summer (DST): UTC-4 (EDT)
- ZIP code: 33880
- Area code: 863
- FIPS code: 12-35300
- GNIS feature ID: 2402630

Jan Phyl Village is a census-designated place (CDP) in Polk County, Florida, United States. As of the 2020 census, Jan Phyl Village had a population of 5,927. It is part of the Lakeland–Winter Haven Metropolitan Statistical Area.

== History ==
Jan Phyl Village was formed from a purchase in 1950 of 1,200 acres of land west of Winter Haven, purchased by Harry Lesnick of Vermont. He christened the area Jan Phyl Village after his daughters, Janet and Phyllis Lesnick. Most of the early development was real estate, sold to airmen and pilot instructors stationed at the nearby Bartow Air Base during the Korean War. The area suffered its first recession in 1953 at the cessation of U.S. military activity in Korea, leading to many homes being foreclosed. The area remains economically depressed as of 2014, with many closed storefronts. If a proposed transportation improvement program planned by the Polk Transportation Planning Organization is approved, major thoroughfares in the area will be widened by 2030 to accommodate additional traffic.

== Geography ==
According to the United States Census Bureau, the CDP has a total area of 4.8 square miles (12 km^{2}), of which 4.7 square miles (12 km^{2}) is land and 0.1 square miles (0.26 km^{2}) (2.28%) is water.

== Demographics ==
Historical population
Census	Pop.	Note	%±
1970	1,340		—
1980	2,785		107.8%
1990	5,308		90.6%
2000	5,633		6.1%
2020	5,927		—

=== 2020 census ===
As of the 2020 census, Jan Phyl Village had a population of 5,927. The median age was 37.5 years. 25.5% of residents were under the age of 18 and 16.0% of residents were 65 years of age or older. For every 100 females there were 95.5 males, and for every 100 females age 18 and over there were 93.3 males age 18 and over.

99.8% of residents lived in urban areas, while 0.2% lived in rural areas.

There were 2,056 households in Jan Phyl Village, of which 34.6% had children under the age of 18 living in them. Of all households, 50.0% were married-couple households, 16.6% were households with a male householder and no spouse or partner present, and 25.4% were households with a female householder and no spouse or partner present. About 18.9% of all households were made up of individuals and 7.8% had someone living alone who was 65 years of age or older.

There were 2,193 housing units, of which 6.2% were vacant. The homeowner vacancy rate was 1.3% and the rental vacancy rate was 6.3%.

Racial composition as of the 2020 census
Race	Number	Percent
White	3,481	58.7%
Black or African American	1,168	19.7%
American Indian and Alaska Native	33	0.6%
Asian	78	1.3%
Native Hawaiian and Other Pacific Islander	6	0.1%
Some other race	472	8.0%
Two or more races	689	11.6%
Hispanic or Latino (of any race)	1,333	22.5%

=== 2000 census ===
As of the 2000 census, there were 5,633 people, 1,947 households, and 1,573 families residing in the CDP. The population density was 1,194.5 inhabitants per square mile (461.2/km^{2}). There were 2,033 housing units at an average density of 431.1 per square mile (166.4/km^{2}). The racial makeup of the CDP was 75.84% White, 16.90% African American, 0.23% Native American, 1.95% Asian, 2.34% from other races, and 2.73% from two or more races. Hispanic or Latino of any race were 7.01% of the population.

There were 1,947 households, out of which 41.6% had children under the age of 18 living with them, 60.6% were married couples living together, 15.2% had a female householder with no husband present, and 19.2% were non-families. 14.8% of all households were made up of individuals, and 5.9% had someone living alone who was 65 years of age or older. The average household size was 2.89 and the average family size was 3.17.

In the CDP, the population was spread out, with 30.0% under the age of 18, 9.5% from 18 to 24, 29.5% from 25 to 44, 22.2% from 45 to 64, and 8.9% who were 65 years of age or older. The median age was 33 years. For every 100 females, there were 90.9 males. For every 100 females age 18 and over, there were 89.1 males.

The median income for a household in the CDP was $41,219, and the median income for a family was $45,958. Males had a median income of $30,117 versus $21,072 for females. The per capita income for the CDP was $16,389. About 5.6% of families and 8.5% of the population were below the poverty line, including 14.9% of those under age 18 and 1.8% of those age 65 or over.
