= Crooked Lake Park, Florida =

- Census-designated place
- Location in Polk County and the state of Florida
- Coordinates: 27°49′48″N 81°35′25″W
- Country: United States
- State: Florida
- County: Polk

Area
  - Total: 0.71 sq mi (1.84 km^{2})
  - Land: 0.69 sq mi (1.78 km^{2})
  - Water: 0.023 sq mi (0.06 km^{2})
- Elevation: 138 ft (42 m)

Population (2020)
  - Total: 1,893
  - Density: 2,754.1/sq mi (1,063.35/km^{2})
- Time zone: UTC-5 (Eastern (EST))
  - Summer (DST): UTC-4 (EDT)
- ZIP code: 33859
- Area code: 863
- FIPS code: 12-15515
- GNIS feature ID: 2402805

Crooked Lake Park is a census-designated place (CDP) in Polk County, Florida, United States. As of the 2020 census, Crooked Lake Park had a population of 1,893. It is part of the Lakeland–Winter Haven Metropolitan Statistical Area.

== Geography ==
According to the United States Census Bureau, the CDP has a total area of 1.5 km^{2} (0.58 sq mi), all land.

Crooked Lake Park is across US 27 from Warner University.

== Demographics ==
Historical population
Census	Pop.	Note	%±
2020	1,893		—
U.S. Decennial Census

=== 2020 census ===
As of the 2020 census, Crooked Lake Park had a population of 1,893. The median age was 36.5 years. 25.7% of residents were under the age of 18 and 18.1% of residents were 65 years of age or older. For every 100 females there were 100.7 males, and for every 100 females age 18 and over there were 101.1 males age 18 and over.

0.0% of residents lived in urban areas, while 100.0% lived in rural areas.

There were 717 households in Crooked Lake Park, of which 28.6% had children under the age of 18 living in them. Of all households, 45.6% were married-couple households, 18.7% were households with a male householder and no spouse or partner present, and 25.0% were households with a female householder and no spouse or partner present. About 23.9% of all households were made up of individuals and 11.6% had someone living alone who was 65 years of age or older.

There were 796 housing units, of which 9.9% were vacant. The homeowner vacancy rate was 2.2% and the rental vacancy rate was 3.0%.

Racial composition as of the 2020 census
Race	Number	Percent
White	1,383	73.1%
Black or African American	134	7.1%
American Indian and Alaska Native	9	0.5%
Asian	10	0.5%
Native Hawaiian and Other Pacific Islander	7	0.4%
Some other race	171	9.0%
Two or more races	179	9.5%
Hispanic or Latino (of any race)	512	27.0%

=== 2000 census ===
As of the 2000 census, there were 1,682 people, 645 households, and 472 families residing in the CDP. The population density was 1,159.7 people/km^{2} (3,004 people/mi^{2}). There were 758 housing units at an average density of 522.6 units/km^{2} (1,354 units/mi^{2}). The racial makeup of the CDP was 91.56% White, 4.28% African American, 0.65% Native American, 0.36% Asian, 2.08% from other races, and 1.07% from two or more races. Hispanic or Latino of any race were 5.83% of the population.

There were 645 households, out of which 27.0% had children under the age of 18 living with them, 60.6% were married couples living together, 8.4% had a female householder with no husband present, and 26.7% were non-families. 22.5% of all households were made up of individuals, and 14.1% had someone living alone who was 65 years of age or older. The average household size was 2.47 and the average family size was 2.84.

In the CDP, the population was spread out, with 21.8% under the age of 18, 12.5% from 18 to 24, 22.4% from 25 to 44, 22.0% from 45 to 64, and 21.3% who were 65 years of age or older. The median age was 40 years. For every 100 females, there were 84.0 males. For every 100 females age 18 and over, there were 82.1 males.

The median income for a household in the CDP was $35,804, and the median income for a family was $42,404. Males had a median income of $26,125 versus $22,075 for females. The per capita income for the CDP was $18,731. About 3.0% of families and 5.3% of the population were below the poverty line, including 4.6% of those under age 18 and none of those age 65 or over.
