= Webber International University =

Private university in Babson Park, Florida, US

- Former name: Webber College (1927–2001)
- Motto: A Tradition in Business Education
- Type: Private university
- Established: 1927; 99 years ago
- Endowment: $4.9 million
- President: Nelson Marquez
- Students: 800
- Location: Babson Park, Florida, U.S. 27.8398°N 81.5359°W
- Campus: 110 acres (0.45 km^{2})
- Colors: Forest Green & Gold
- Nickname: Warriors
- Sporting affiliations: NAIA – The Sun
- Website: webber.edu
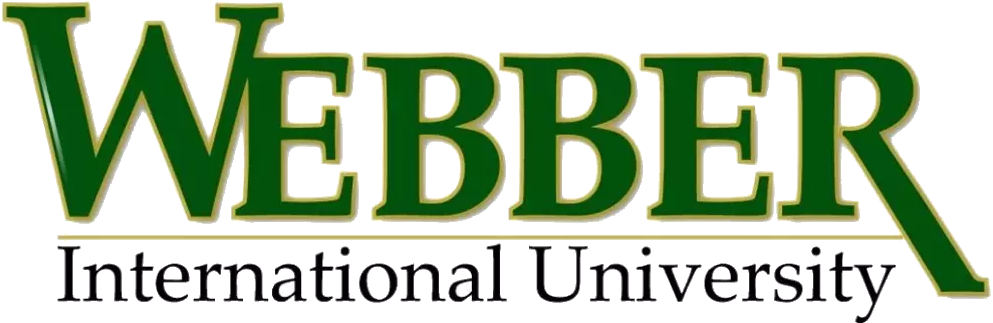

Webber International University (Webber or WIU) is a private university in Babson Park, Florida.

== History ==
Webber International was founded as "Webber College" by Roger Babson, an entrepreneur and business theorist in the first half of the 20th century. Established in 1927, it was the first private college chartered under Florida's then new charitable and educational laws, and one of the nation's first business schools for women. Webber International University now hosts men and women from some 48 different nations.

In February 2011, Webber announced a merger with St. Andrews College in Laurinburg, North Carolina. In January 2014, Webber announced the acquisition of Virginia Intermont College in Bristol, Virginia, but these efforts were abandoned later the same year. In late April of 2025, it was announced St. Andrews University was closing effective May 5 for both in-person and on-line classes, due to financial difficulties.

== Academics ==
The university is accredited by the Commission on Colleges of the Southern Association of Colleges and Schools to award degrees at the associate, bachelor's, and master's levels.

== Athletics ==
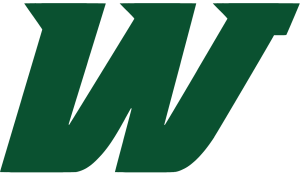
Webber athletics logo

The Webber International athletic teams are called the Warriors. The university is a member of the National Association of Intercollegiate Athletics (NAIA), primarily competing in the Sun Conference (formerly known as the Florida Sun Conference (FSC) until after the 2007–08 school year) for most of its sports since the 1990–91 academic year. Its football team formerly competed in the Mid-South Conference (MSC) until after the 2021 fall season. They are also a member of the National Christian College Athletic Association (NCCAA), primarily competing as an independent in the South Region of the Division I level.

== Notable alumni ==
- Vince Anderson, former NFL defensive back
- Verity Crawley, professional bowler in Professional Women's Bowling Association (PWBA)
- Bo Dallas, professional wrestler
- Gary Faulkner Jr., ten-pin bowler, competes on PBA Tour
- Taula "Hikuleo" Fifita, professional wrestler
- Daria Pająk, ten-pin bowler in Professional Women's Bowling Association (PWBA)
- Leandro, Brazilian professional soccer player
