= Babson Park, Florida =

Census-designated place in Florida, US

- Census-designated place
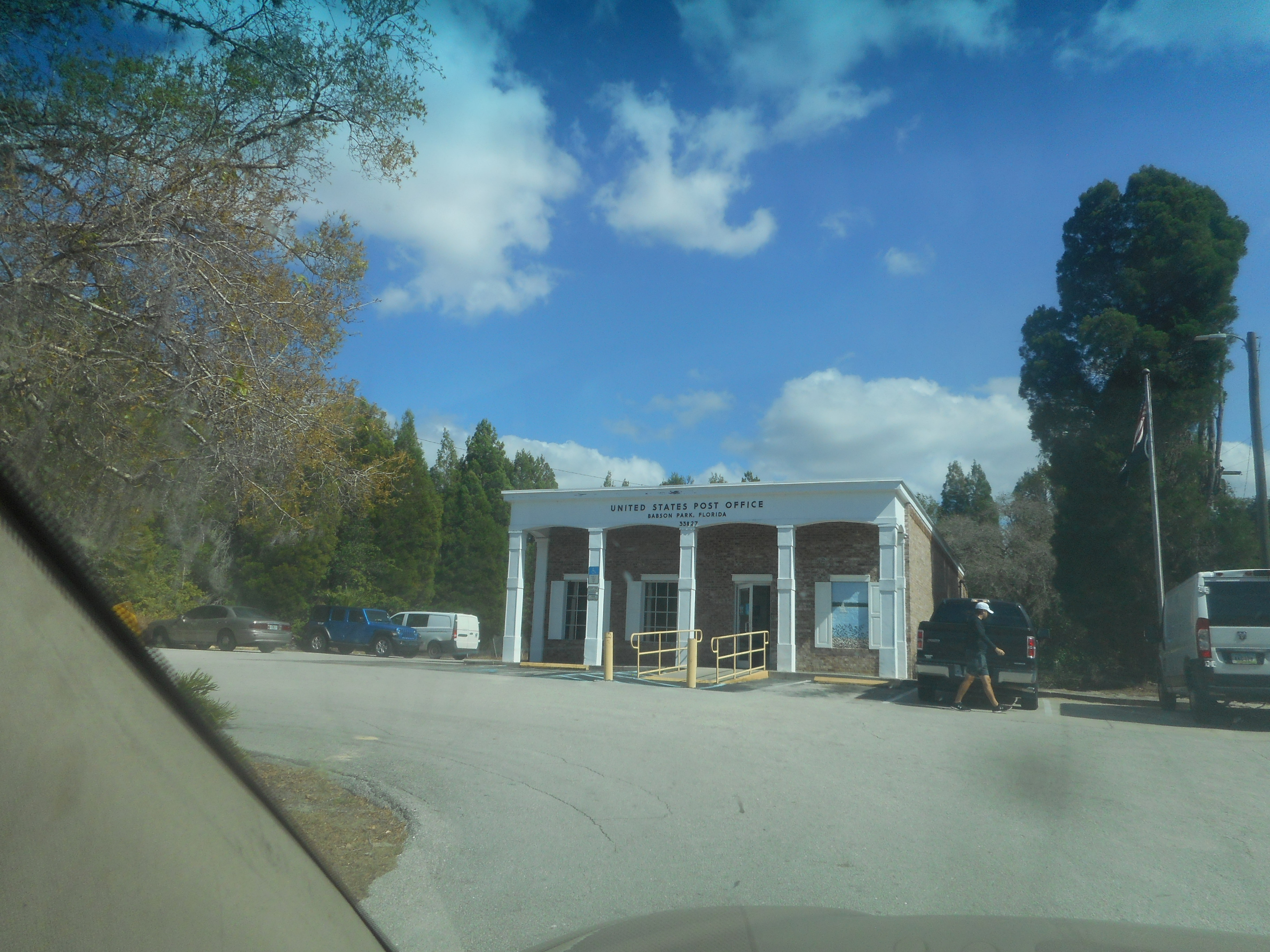
- The Babson Park Post Office as seen from the entrance on SR 17.

- Location in Polk County, Florida
- Coordinates: 27°50′03″N 81°31′41″W
- Country: United States
- State: Florida
- County: Polk

Area
  - Total: 1.53 sq mi (3.95 km^{2})
  - Land: 1.53 sq mi (3.95 km^{2})
  - Water: 0 sq mi (0.00 km^{2})
- Elevation: 125 ft (38 m)

Population (2020)
  - Total: 1,330
  - Density: 872.8/sq mi (336.98/km^{2})
- Time zone: UTC-5 (Eastern (EST))
  - Summer (DST): UTC-4 (EDT)
- ZIP code: 33827
- Area code: 863
- FIPS code: 12-02900
- GNIS feature ID: 2402658

Babson Park is a census-designated place (CDP) in Polk County, Florida, United States. As of the 2020 census, Babson Park had a population of 1,330. It is also the home of Webber International University.

Babson Park is part of the Lakeland–Winter Haven Metropolitan Statistical Area, situated roughly halfway between Tampa and Orlando.

== Geography ==
According to the United States Census Bureau, the CDP has a total area of 3.9 km^{2} (1.5 sq mi), all land.

== History ==
The original name of the general area was Cody Villa, after the Cody family that moved there in the 1890s. Later, the community was known as Crooked Lake after the adjacent body of water of the same name. In 1923, economist and entrepreneur Roger Babson purchased approximately 400 acres of land in the Crooked Lake townsite with the intention of creating his own town. The town was soon renamed from Crooked Lake to Babson Park after him.

== Demographics ==
Historical population
Census	Pop.	Note	%±
2020	1,330		—
U.S. Decennial Census

=== 2020 census ===
As of the 2020 census, Babson Park had a population of 1,330. The median age was 25.5 years. 20.6% of residents were under the age of 18 and 13.5% of residents were 65 years of age or older. For every 100 females there were 147.7 males, and for every 100 females age 18 and over there were 176.4 males age 18 and over.

0.0% of residents lived in urban areas, while 100.0% lived in rural areas.

There were 390 households in Babson Park, of which 30.5% had children under the age of 18 living in them. Of all households, 45.1% were married-couple households, 19.5% were households with a male householder and no spouse or partner present, and 24.1% were households with a female householder and no spouse or partner present. About 24.3% of all households were made up of individuals and 11.8% had someone living alone who was 65 years of age or older.

There were 461 housing units, of which 15.4% were vacant. The homeowner vacancy rate was 0.0% and the rental vacancy rate was 8.8%.

Racial composition as of the 2020 census
Race	Number	Percent
White	955	71.8%
Black or African American	158	11.9%
American Indian and Alaska Native	1	0.1%
Asian	9	0.7%
Native Hawaiian and Other Pacific Islander	5	0.4%
Some other race	60	4.5%
Two or more races	142	10.7%
Hispanic or Latino (of any race)	192	14.4%

=== 2000 census ===
As of the census of 2000, there were 1,182 people, 367 households, and 277 families residing in the CDP. The population density was 306.3 people/km^{2} (793 people/mi^{2}). There were 442 housing units at an average density of 114.5 units/km^{2} (297 units/mi^{2}). The racial makeup of the CDP was 77.92% White, 16.92% African American, 1.44% Asian, 2.88% from other races, and 0.85% from two or more races. Hispanic or Latino of any race were 7.11% of the population.

There were 367 households, out of which 41.4% had children under the age of 18 living with them, 56.9% were married couples living together, 12.8% had a female householder with no husband present, and 24.3% were non-families. 17.4% of all households were made up of individuals, and 6.8% had someone living alone who was 65 years of age or older. The average household size was 2.81 and the average family size was 3.22.

In the CDP, the population was spread out, with 26.7% under the age of 18, 18.4% from 18 to 24, 26.1% from 25 to 44, 18.0% from 45 to 64, and 10.8% who were 65 years of age or older. The median age was 30 years. For every 100 females, there were 104.1 males. For every 100 females age 18 and over, there were 100.9 males.

The median income for a household in the CDP was $28,487, and the median income for a family was $34,444. Males had a median income of $30,625 versus $18,875 for females. The per capita income for the CDP was $11,912. About 9.2% of families and 10.3% of the population were below the poverty line, including 8.0% of those under age 18 and 15.9% of those age 65 or over.

== Education ==
Despite its small size, Babson Park is home to Webber International University and just a five-mile from Warner University. Babson Park is also home to Dale R. Fair Babson Park Elementary.

== Climate ==
The climate in this area is characterized by hot, humid summers and generally mild to cool winters. According to the Köppen Climate Classification system, Babson Park has a humid subtropical climate, abbreviated "Cfa" on climate maps.
