= 2014 NAIA baseball tournament =

- Teams: 46
- Finals site: Harris Field; Lewiston, Idaho
- Champions: Cumberland (TN) (3rd title)
- Winning coach: Woody Hunt
- MVP: Sam Lind (Cumberland)

The 2014 NAIA baseball tournament was the 58th edition of the NAIA baseball championship. The 46-team tournament began on May 12 with Opening Round games across nine different sites and concluded with the 2014 NAIA World Series in Lewiston, Idaho that began on May 23 and ended on May 30.

Cumberland (TN) defeated Lewis–Clark State (ID) 3–0 in the championship game for their 3rd title in program history. Cumberland became the first and as of 2024, the only team to ever win an NAIA World Series title as a 10 seed since seeding began in 2003. This is also the most recent shutout in an NAIA baseball championship game.

The 46 participating teams were selected from all eligible NAIA teams with the World Series host receiving an automatic bid to the NAIA World Series. The remaining 45 teams participated in the Opening Round with 31 teams being awarded automatic bids as either champions and/or runners-up of their conferences, and 14 teams were selected at-large, which were determined by the final NAIA Baseball Coaches' Top 25 Poll. Teams were then placed into one of nine pre-determined Opening Round sites of five teams a piece, each of which is conducted via a double-elimination tournament. The winners of each of the Opening Round sites plus the World Series host team participated in the NAIA World Series.

This would be the final year in which at-large berths were awarded based on the final Top 25 Coaches' Poll.

== Tournament procedure ==
A total of 46 teams entered the tournament. As World Series host, Lewis–Clark State received an automatic bid into the NAIA World Series. 31 automatic bids were determined by either winning their conference's regular season championship, conference tournament, and/or conference tournament runner-up. The other 14 bids were at-large, with selections determined by the final NAIA Baseball Coaches' Top 25 Poll.

== Opening round hosts ==
On April 15, the NAIA announced the nine opening round host sites, which were played from May 12–15.

Opening Round hosts

| Venue(s) | Location(s) | Host(s) |
|---|---|---|
| Hunter Wright Stadium | Kingsport, TN | Appalachian Athletic Conference |
| Smith-Wills Stadium | Jackson, MS | Belhaven University |
| Wildcat Field; Winterholter Field (Note: Due to weather delays, Game 6 on May 14 between Georgetown (KY) and Midland (NE) was played at Winterholter Field on the campus of Taylor University.) | Marion, IN; Upland, IN | Crossroads League |
| Sliwa Stadium | Daytona Beach, FL | Embry–Riddle Aeronautical University (FL) |
| Harrison Field | Montgomery, AL | Faulkner University |
| Grizzly Baseball Complex | Lawrenceville, GA | Georgia Gwinnett College |
| Bison Field at Ford Park | Shawnee, OK | Oklahoma Baptist University |
| Hobart-Detter Field | Hutchinson, KS | Tabor College |
| Reese Field | Santa Clarita, CA | The Master's College |

== Bids ==
=== Automatic ===
| School | Conference | Record | Berth | Last NAIA Appearance |
|---|---|---|---|---|
| Bacone (OK) | Red River | 34–18 | Tournament champion | 2012 (Cleveland Bracket) |
| British Columbia | NAIA West Group | 32–11 | Tournament champion | 2011 (Riverside Bracket) |
| Bryan (TN) | Appalachian | 33–26 | Tournament runner-up | First appearance |
| Culver–Stockton (MO) | Heart | 29–26 | Tournament runner-up | 2011 (Cleveland Bracket) |
| Cumberland (TN) | Mid-South | 40–18 | Tournament champion | 2013 (Joliet Bracket) |
| Davenport (MI) | Wolverine-Hoosier | 41–15 | Tournament champion | First appearance |
| Doane (NE) | Great Plains | 42–9 | Regular season champion | 2012 (Marion Bracket) |
| Embry–Riddle (FL) | The Sun | 37–19 | Regular season champion | 2013 NAIA World Series |
| Faulkner (AL) | Southern States | 46–14 | Tournament runner-up | 2013 NAIA World Series |
| Georgetown (KY) | Mid-South | 42–8 | Regular season champion | 2013 (Montgomery Bracket) |
| Georgia Gwinnett | A.I.I. | 48–10 | Tournament champion | First appearance |
| Houston–Victoria (TX) | A.I.I. | 23–21 | Tournament runner-up | 2010 (Group 6 Bracket) |
| Jamestown (ND) | Frontier/North Star | 35–8 | Tournament champion | 2013 (Oklahoma City Bracket) |
| Judson (IL) | Chicagoland | 42–17 | Tournament champion | 2013 (Joliet Bracket) |
| Lewis-Clark State (ID) | NAIA West Group | 43–7 | World Series host | 2013 NAIA World Series |
| MidAmerican Nazarene (KS) | Heart | 36–13 | Tournament champion | First appearance |
| Midland (NE) | Great Plains | 42–17 | Tournament champion | 2013 (Claremore Bracket) |
| Missouri Baptist | American Midwest | 45–12 | Tournament runner-up | 2013 NAIA World Series |
| Mount Vernon Nazarene (OH) | Crossroads | 42–10 | Regular season champion | 2013 (Montgomery Bracket) |
| Oklahoma Baptist | Sooner | 50–6 | Tournament champion | 2013 (Hattiesburg Bracket) |
| Oklahoma City | Sooner | 35–17 | Tournament runner-up | 2013 (Oklahoma City Bracket) |
| Oklahoma Wesleyan | Midlands | 52–6 | Tournament champion | First appearance |
| Point (GA) | Appalachian | 31–25 | Tournament runner-up | First appearance |
| Point Park (PA) | Kentucky | 40–16 | Tournament champion | 2013 (Kingsport Bracket) |
| Southeastern (FL) | The Sun | 44–14 | Tournament champion | First appearance |
| Southern Poly (GA) | Southern States | 42–16 | Tournament champion | 2012 (Daytona Beach Bracket) |
| Spring Arbor (MI) | Crossroads | 31–15 | Tournament champion | 2009 (Group 5 Bracket) |
| St. Francis (IL) | Chicagoland | 36–20 | Regular season champion | 2012 (Kingsport Bracket) |
| Tabor (KS) | Kansas | 46–11 | Tournament champion | 2013 (Santa Clarita Bracket) |
| Viterbo (WI) | Midwest | 31–18 | Tournament champion | First appearance |
| Westmont (CA) | Golden State | 38–17 | Tournament champion | First appearance |
| William Woods (MO) | American Midwest | 39–10 | Tournament champion | 2011 (Montgomery Bracket) |

=== At–Large ===
| School | Conference | Record | Last NAIA Appearance |
|---|---|---|---|
| Belhaven (MS) | Southern States | 40–19 | 2011 (Oklahoma City Bracket) |
| Bellevue (NE) | Midlands | 37–15–2 | 2013 (Claremore Bracket) |
| Brewton–Parker (GA) | Southern States | 32–11 | 2011 (Daytona Beach Bracket) |
| Friends (KS) | Kansas | 36–23 | First appearance |
| LSU–Alexandria | A.I.I. | 34–23 | First appearance |
| LSU–Shreveport | Red River | 42–16 | 2013 (Cleveland Bracket) |
| Mayville State (ND) | Frontier/North Star | 40–14 | 2013 (Joliet Bracket) |
| Northwestern (IA) | Great Plains | 41–11 | 2013 (Oklahoma City Bracket) |
| San Diego Christian (CA) | Golden State | 39–18 | 2013 (Santa Clarita Bracket) |
| Sterling (KS) | Kansas | 39–18 | 2013 NAIA World Series |
| Talladega (AL) | Gulf Coast | 39–18 | First appearance |
| Tennessee Wesleyan | Appalachian | 33–22–1 | 2013 (Kingsport Bracket) |
| The Master's (CA) | Golden State | 37–16 | 2013 NAIA World Series |
| Vanguard (CA) | Golden State | 31–21 | 2010 (Group 2 Bracket) |

== Opening Round ==
=== Daytona Beach Bracket ===
Hosted by Embry–Riddle (FL) at Sliwa Stadium

First round
4 | Tennessee Wesleyan | 2
5 | LSU–Alexandria | 8
First round
4 | Tennessee Wesleyan | 11
3 | Talladega | 9

Second round
1 | Southern Poly (GA) | 20
5 | LSU–Alexandria | 6
2 | Embry–Riddle (FL) | 7
3 | Talladega (AL) | 6
Second round
5 | LSU–Alexandria | 1
4 | Tennessee Wesleyan | 2^{11}

Semifinals
1 | Southern Poly | 4
2 | Embry–Riddle (FL) | 1
Semifinals
2 | Embry–Riddle (FL) | 7
4 | Tennessee Wesleyan | 2

Finals
1 | Southern Poly | 2 | 8
2 | Embry–Riddle (FL) | 10 | 0

=== Hutchinson Bracket ===
Hosted by Tabor (KS) at Hobart-Detter Field

First round
4 | Mayville State (ND) | 0
5 | Viterbo (WI) | 7
First round
4 | Mayville State | 1
2 | Doane | 0

Second round
1 | Tabor (KS) | 3
5 | Viterbo | 2
2 | Doane (NE) | 2
3 | Jamestown (ND) | 6
Second round
5 | Viterbo | 12
4 | Mayville State | 3

Semifinals
1 | Tabor | 4
3 | Jamestown | 0
Semifinals
3 | Jamestown | 4
5 | Viterbo | 11

Finals
1 | Tabor | 5 | –
5 | Viterbo | 1 | –

=== Jackson Bracket ===
Hosted by Belhaven (MS) at Smith-Wills Stadium

First round
4 | Sterling (KS) | 2
5 | Houston–Victoria (TX) | 5
First round
4 | Sterling | 3
2 | Oklahoma City | 1

Second round
1 | Oklahoma Wesleyan | 5
5 | Houston–Victoria | 3
2 | Oklahoma City | 8
3 | Belhaven (MS) | 9
Second round
5 | Houston–Victoria | 3
4 | Sterling | 2

Semifinals
1 | Oklahoma Wesleyan | 4
3 | Belhaven | 2
Semifinals
3 | Belhaven | 11
5 | Houston–Victoria | 4

Finals
1 | Oklahoma Wesleyan | 8 | –
3 | Belhaven | 7 | –

=== Kingsport Bracket ===
Hosted by the Appalachian Athletic Conference at Hunter Wright Stadium

First round
4 | Bryan (TN) | 2
5 | Culver–Stockton (MO) | 4
First round
4 | Bryan | 4
2 | Brewton–Parker | 3

Second round
1 | Missouri Baptist | 11
5 | Culver–Stockton | 10
2 | Brewton–Parker (GA) | 3
3 | Cumberland (TN) | 8
Second round
5 | Culver–Stockton | 4
4 | Bryan | 5

Semifinals
1 | Missouri Baptist | 5
3 | Cumberland (TN) | 2
Semifinals
3 | Cumberland (TN) | 8
4 | Bryan | 1

Finals
1 | Missouri Baptist | 4 | 3
3 | Cumberland (TN) | 6 | 6

=== Lawrenceville Bracket ===
Hosted by Georgia Gwinnett at Grizzly Baseball Complex

First round
4 | Westmont (CA) | 1
5 | St. Francis (IL) | 2
First round
4 | Westmont | 6^{12}
3 | William Woods | 5

Second round
1 | Georgia Gwinnett | 2
5 | St. Francis (IL) | 3
2 | Southeastern (FL) | 11
3 | William Woods (MO) | 5
Second round
1 | Georgia Gwinnett | 9
4 | Westmont | 8

Semifinals
5 | St. Francis (IL) | 0
2 | Southeastern (FL) | 7
Semifinals
5 | St. Francis (IL) | 8
1 | Georgia Gwinnett | 11

Finals
2 | Southeastern (FL) | 5 | 4
1 | Georgia Gwinnett | 14 | 7

=== Marion Bracket ===
Hosted by the Crossroads League at Wildcat Field

First round
4 | Midland (NE) | 5
5 | Spring Arbor (MI) | 7
First round
4 | Midland | 6
2 | Point Park | 3

Second round
1 | Georgetown (KY) | 4
5 | Spring Arbor | 8
2 | Point Park (PA) | 4
3 | Mount Vernon Nazarene (OH) | 8
Second round
1 | Georgetown | 11
4 | Midland | 1

Semifinals
5 | Spring Arbor | 1
3 | Mount Vernon Nazarene | 4
Semifinals
5 | Spring Arbor | 5
1 | Georgetown | 9

Finals
3 | Mount Vernon Nazarene | 4 | 4
1 | Georgetown | 5^{10} | 11

=== Montgomery Bracket ===
Hosted by Faulkner (AL) at Harrison Field

First round
4 | Judson (IL) | 4
5 | Point (GA) | 11
First round
4 | Judson | 5
2 | LSU–Shreveport | 8

Second round
1 | Faulkner (AL) | 7
5 | Point | 0
2 | LSU–Shreveport | 10
3 | MidAmerica Nazarene (KS) | 14
Second round
5 | Point | 1
2 | LSU–Shreveport | 2

Semifinals
1 | Faulkner | 5
3 | MidAmerica Nazarene | 1
Semifinals
3 | MidAmerica Nazarene | 0
2 | LSU–Shreveport | 2

Finals
1 | Faulkner | 11 | –
2 | LSU–Shreveport | 1 | –

=== Santa Clarita Bracket ===
Hosted by The Master's (CA) at Reese Field

First round
4 | Vanguard (CA) | 0
5 | British Columbia | 1
First round
4 | Vanguard | 2
2 | The Master's | 0

Second round
1 | San Diego Christian (CA) | 12
5 | British Columbia | 2
2 | The Master's (CA) | 0
3 | Davenport (MI) | 4
Second round
5 | British Columbia | 10
4 | Vanguard | 4

Semifinals
1 | San Diego Christian | 2
3 | Davenport | 1
Semifinals
3 | Davenport | 3
5 | British Columbia | 4

Finals
1 | San Diego Christian | 2 | –
5 | British Columbia | 0 | –

=== Shawnee Bracket ===
Hosted by Oklahoma Baptist at Bison Field at Ford Park

First round
4 | Friends (KS) | 2
5 | Bacone (OK) | 5
First round
4 | Friends | 5
3 | Northwestern (IA) | 12

Second round
1 | Oklahoma Baptist | 10
5 | Bacone | 3
2 | Bellevue (NE) | 2
3 | Northwestern (IA) | 1
Second round
5 | Bacone | 2
3 | Northwestern (IA) | 0

Semifinals
1 | Oklahoma Baptist | 4
2 | Bellevue | 0
Semifinals
2 | Bellevue | 2
5 | Bacone | 1

Finals
1 | Oklahoma Baptist | 2 | 13
2 | Bellevue | 4 | 6

== NAIA World Series ==
The NAIA World Series was held at Harris Field in Lewiston, Idaho.

=== Participants ===
| School | Conference | Record | Head Coach | Bracket | Previous NAIA WS Appearances | Best NAIA WS Finish | NAIA WS Record |
|---|---|---|---|---|---|---|---|
| Cumberland (TN) | Mid-South | 44–19 | Woody Hunt | Kingsport | 11 (last: 2010) | 1st (2004, 2010) | 25–18 |
| Faulkner (AL) | Southern States | 49–14 | Patrick McCarthy | Montgomery | 2 (last: 2013) | 1st (2013) | 5–2 |
| Georgetown (KY) | Mid-South | 46–9 | Micah Baumfeld | Marion | 1 (last: 1988) | T-5th (1988) | 2–2 |
| Georgia Gwinnett | A.I.I. | 52–11 | Brad Stromdahl | Lawrenceville | none | none | 0–0 |
| Lewis–Clark State (ID) | NAIA West Group (Frontier) | 43–7 | Jeremiah Robbins | n/a | 32 (last: 2013) | 1st (1984, 1985, 1987, 1988, 1989, 1990, 1991, 1992, 1996, 1999, 2000, 2002, 2003, 2006, 2007, 2008) | 124–41 |
| Oklahoma Baptist | Sooner | 53–7 | Bobby Cox | Shawnee | 3 (last: 2011) | 4th (1989) | 3–6 |
| Oklahoma Wesleyan | Midlands | 55–6 | Matt Parker | Jackson | none | none | 0–0 |
| San Diego Christian (CA) | Golden State | 42–18 | Chris Bando | Santa Clarita | none | none | 0–0 |
| Southern Poly (GA) | Southern States | 45–17 | Marty Lovrich | Daytona Beach | 2 (last: 2009) | T-5th (2009) | 2–4 |
| Tabor (KS) | Kansas | 49–11 | Mark Standiford | Hutchinson | none | none | 0–0 |

=== Bracket ===
==== Preliminary Bracket ====
First round Friday, May 23
8 | Southern Poly | 0
9 | Tabor | 1
7 | San Diego Christian | 1
10 | Cumberland | 10
First round Saturday, May 24; Losers eliminated
8 | Southern Poly | 5
5 | Georgetown | 4
6 | Georgia Gwinnett | 6
7 | San Diego Christian | 4

First round Friday, May 23; Second round Saturday, May 24
1 | Oklahoma Baptist | 3
9 | Tabor | 1
4 | Faulkner | 5
5 | Georgetown | 4
2 | Lewis–Clark State | 1
10 | Cumberland | 6
3 | Oklahoma Wesleyan | 2
6 | Georgia Gwinnett | 1
Second round Monday, May 26; Losers eliminated
2 | Lewis–Clark State | 9
8 | Southern Poly | 1
9 | Tabor | 6
6 | Georgia Gwinnett | 5

Third round Monday, May 26; Winners to Championship Bracket
1 | Oklahoma Baptist | 7
4 | Faulkner | 2
10 | Cumberland | 8^{10}
3 | Oklahoma Wesleyan | 7
Third round Tuesday, May 27; Winners to Championship Bracket
4 | Faulkner | 0
2 | Lewis–Clark State | 6
3 | Oklahoma Wesleyan | 10^{12}
9 | Tabor | 9

Fourth Round; Tuesday, May 27
1 | Oklahoma Baptist | 5
10 | Cumberland | 13

==== Championship Bracket ====
First Round; Wednesday, May 28
10 | Cumberland | 5
2 | Lewis–Clark State | 6
1 | Oklahoma Baptist | 3
3 | Oklahoma Wesleyan | 4^{11}

Semifinal; Thursday, May 29
2 | Lewis–Clark State | 9
3 | Oklahoma Wesleyan | 5

Final; Friday, May 30
2 | Lewis–Clark State | 0
10 | Cumberland | 3

=== Game Results ===
All game times are listed in Pacific Daylight Time (UTC−07:00).

==== Preliminary Bracket ====
| Friday, May 23; 9:00 am Game 1 | (8) Southern Poly | 0–1 | (9) Tabor | Harris Field; Attendance: 1110; Umpires: HP: Sean Bolte, 1B: Tracy Roles, 2B: Cory Spangler, 3B: Steve Miller |
| Friday, May 23; 9:00 am Game 1 | LP: Zach Smith (7–4) | Boxscore | WP: Junior Mustain (12–2); Sv: Jean Acevedo (1) | Harris Field; Attendance: 1110; Umpires: HP: Sean Bolte, 1B: Tracy Roles, 2B: Cory Spangler, 3B: Steve Miller |

| Friday, May 23; 12:00 pm Game 2 | (5) Georgetown | 4–5 | (4) Faulkner | Harris Field; Attendance: 1190; Umpires: HP: Cory Spangler, 1B: Steve Miller, 2B: Sean Bolte, 3B: Eric Johansen |
| Friday, May 23; 12:00 pm Game 2 | LP: Shaun Meyer (9–2) | Boxscore | WP: Brad Griffis (5–2) | Harris Field; Attendance: 1190; Umpires: HP: Cory Spangler, 1B: Steve Miller, 2B: Sean Bolte, 3B: Eric Johansen |
| Friday, May 23; 12:00 pm Game 2 | HR: Martin Lemus (13) | Boxscore | | Harris Field; Attendance: 1190; Umpires: HP: Cory Spangler, 1B: Steve Miller, 2B: Sean Bolte, 3B: Eric Johansen |

| Friday, May 23; 3:40 pm Game 3 | (6) Georgia Gwinnett | 1–2 | (3) Oklahoma Wesleyan | Harris Field; Attendance: 555; Umpires: HP: Shannon Bunger, 1B: Dwayne Finley, 2B: Tracy Roles, 3B: Tim Farwig |
| Friday, May 23; 3:40 pm Game 3 | LP: Tyler Carpenter (8–2) | Boxscore | WP: Diego Ibarra (13–1); Sv: CJ Gregory (14) | Harris Field; Attendance: 555; Umpires: HP: Shannon Bunger, 1B: Dwayne Finley, 2B: Tracy Roles, 3B: Tim Farwig |

| Friday, May 23; 7:00 pm Game 4 | (7) San Diego Christian | 1–10 | (10) Cumberland | Harris Field; Umpires: HP: Eric Johansen, 1B: Tim Farwig, 2B: Shannon Bunger, 3B: Dwayne Finley |
| Friday, May 23; 7:00 pm Game 4 | LP: Gabriel Hemmer (13–4) | Boxscore | WP: Jake Collier (9–3) | Harris Field; Umpires: HP: Eric Johansen, 1B: Tim Farwig, 2B: Shannon Bunger, 3B: Dwayne Finley |

| Saturday, May 24; 9:00 am Game 5 | (8) Southern Poly | 5–4 | (5) Georgetown | Harris Field; Attendance: 650; Umpires: HP: Dwayne Finley, 1B: Sean Bolte, 2B: Tracy Roles, 3B: Cory Spangler |
| Saturday, May 24; 9:00 am Game 5 | WP: Brantley Burton (4–0); Sv: Cole Goodwin (1) | Boxscore | LP: Edwin Santiago (5–4) | Harris Field; Attendance: 650; Umpires: HP: Dwayne Finley, 1B: Sean Bolte, 2B: Tracy Roles, 3B: Cory Spangler |

| Saturday, May 24; 1:05 pm Game 6 | (7) San Diego Christian | 4–6 | (6) Georgia Gwinnett | Harris Field; Attendance: 890; Umpires: HP: Tracy Roles, 1B: Cory Spangler, 2B: Dwayne Finley, 3B: Sean Bolte |
| Saturday, May 24; 1:05 pm Game 6 | LP: Joey Aquino (6–3) | Boxscore | WP: Alex Roberts (9–2); Sv: Zeke McGranahan (7) | Harris Field; Attendance: 890; Umpires: HP: Tracy Roles, 1B: Cory Spangler, 2B: Dwayne Finley, 3B: Sean Bolte |
| Saturday, May 24; 1:05 pm Game 6 | | Boxscore | HR: Ty Abbott (4), Zach Alvord (4) | Harris Field; Attendance: 890; Umpires: HP: Tracy Roles, 1B: Cory Spangler, 2B: Dwayne Finley, 3B: Sean Bolte |

| Saturday, May 24; 4:15 pm Game 7 | (9) Tabor | 1–3 | (1) Oklahoma Baptist | Harris Field; Attendance: 1245; Umpires: HP: Steve Miller, 1B: Eric Johansen, 2B: Tim Farwig, 3B: Shannon Bunger |
| Saturday, May 24; 4:15 pm Game 7 | LP: Jacob Webb (11–4) | Boxscore | WP: Julian Merryweather (12–2) | Harris Field; Attendance: 1245; Umpires: HP: Steve Miller, 1B: Eric Johansen, 2B: Tim Farwig, 3B: Shannon Bunger |

| Saturday, May 24; 7:15 pm Game 8 | (10) Cumberland | 6–1 | (2) Lewis–Clark State | Harris Field; Attendance: 4175; Umpires: HP: Tim Farwig, 1B: Shannon Bunger, 2B: Steve Miller, 3B: Eric Johansen |
| Saturday, May 24; 7:15 pm Game 8 | WP: Anthony Gomez (6–4) | Boxscore | LP: Michael Noteware (6–2) | Harris Field; Attendance: 4175; Umpires: HP: Tim Farwig, 1B: Shannon Bunger, 2B: Steve Miller, 3B: Eric Johansen |
| Saturday, May 24; 7:15 pm Game 8 | HR: Sam Lind (15), Brady North (12) | Boxscore | | Harris Field; Attendance: 4175; Umpires: HP: Tim Farwig, 1B: Shannon Bunger, 2B: Steve Miller, 3B: Eric Johansen |

| Monday, May 26; 9:00 am Game 9 | (6) Georgia Gwinnett | 5–6 | (9) Tabor | Harris Field; Attendance: 1010; Umpires: HP: Dwayne Finley, 1B: Steve Miller, 2B: Shannon Bunger, 3B: Tim Farwig |
| Monday, May 26; 9:00 am Game 9 | LP: Zeke McGranahan (3–3) | Boxscore | WP: Russell Longworth (10–2) | Harris Field; Attendance: 1010; Umpires: HP: Dwayne Finley, 1B: Steve Miller, 2B: Shannon Bunger, 3B: Tim Farwig |
| Monday, May 26; 9:00 am Game 9 | HR: John Fidanza (2) | Boxscore | | Harris Field; Attendance: 1010; Umpires: HP: Dwayne Finley, 1B: Steve Miller, 2B: Shannon Bunger, 3B: Tim Farwig |

| Monday, May 26; 12:45 pm Game 10 | (2) Lewis–Clark State | 9–1 | (8) Southern Poly | Harris Field; Attendance: 4160; Umpires: HP: Shannon Bunger, 1B: Tim Farwig, 2B: Dwayne Finley, 3B: Steve Miller |
| Monday, May 26; 12:45 pm Game 10 | WP: Gunnar Swanson (5–2) | Boxscore | LP: Cole Goodwin (4–3) | Harris Field; Attendance: 4160; Umpires: HP: Shannon Bunger, 1B: Tim Farwig, 2B: Dwayne Finley, 3B: Steve Miller |

| Monday, May 26; 4:15 pm Game 11 | (4) Faulkner | 2–7 | (1) Oklahoma Baptist | Harris Field; Attendance: 1225; Umpires: HP: Eric Johansen, 1B: Cory Spangler, 2B: Sean Bolte, 3B: Tracy Roles |
| Monday, May 26; 4:15 pm Game 11 | LP: Jay Gause (4–3) | Boxscore | WP: Jinny Parra (8–2) | Harris Field; Attendance: 1225; Umpires: HP: Eric Johansen, 1B: Cory Spangler, 2B: Sean Bolte, 3B: Tracy Roles |

| Monday, May 26; 7:45 pm Game 12 | (3) Oklahoma Wesleyan | 7–8 (F/10) | (10) Cumberland | Harris Field; Umpires: HP: Sean Bolte, 1B: Tracy Roles, 2B: Eric Johansen, 3B: Cory Spangler |
| Monday, May 26; 7:45 pm Game 12 | LP: Sam Haynes (8–2) | Boxscore | WP: Clint Meadows (8–4) | Harris Field; Umpires: HP: Sean Bolte, 1B: Tracy Roles, 2B: Eric Johansen, 3B: Cory Spangler |
| Monday, May 26; 7:45 pm Game 12 | HR: Jose Ruiz (14) | Boxscore | | Harris Field; Umpires: HP: Sean Bolte, 1B: Tracy Roles, 2B: Eric Johansen, 3B: Cory Spangler |

| Tuesday, May 27; 12:00 pm Game 13 | (4) Faulkner | 0–6 | (2) Lewis–Clark State | Harris Field; Attendance: 2795; Umpires: HP: Steve Miller, 1B: Tracy Roles, 2B: Cory Spangler, 3B: Shannon Bunger |
| Tuesday, May 27; 12:00 pm Game 13 | LP: Jeremy Holcombe (9–4) | Boxscore | WP: Steve Thompson (6–1); Sv: David Murillo (5) | Harris Field; Attendance: 2795; Umpires: HP: Steve Miller, 1B: Tracy Roles, 2B: Cory Spangler, 3B: Shannon Bunger |

| Tuesday, May 27; 3:00 pm Game 14 | (9) Tabor | 9–10 (F/12) | (3) Oklahoma Wesleyan | Harris Field; Attendance: 590; Umpires: HP: Tim Farwig, 1B: Eric Johansen, 2B: Tracy Roles, 3B: Sean Bolte |
| Tuesday, May 27; 3:00 pm Game 14 | LP: Alex Mann (4–3) | Boxscore | WP: Rhett Acker (9–1) | Harris Field; Attendance: 590; Umpires: HP: Tim Farwig, 1B: Eric Johansen, 2B: Tracy Roles, 3B: Sean Bolte |

| Tuesday, May 27; 6:30 pm Game 15 | (1) Oklahoma Baptist | 5–13 | (10) Cumberland | Harris Field; Attendance: 1170; Umpires: HP: Cory Spangler, 1B: Steve Miller, 2B: Tim Farwig, 3B: Dwayne Finley |
| Tuesday, May 27; 6:30 pm Game 15 | LP: Andrew Millner (4–2) | Boxscore | WP: Kevin T. Greene (5–4); Sv: Stevie Smith (1) | Harris Field; Attendance: 1170; Umpires: HP: Cory Spangler, 1B: Steve Miller, 2B: Tim Farwig, 3B: Dwayne Finley |

==== Championship Bracket ====
| Wednesday, May 28; 3:30 pm Game 16 | (3) Oklahoma Wesleyan | 4–3 (F/11) | (1) Oklahoma Baptist | Harris Field; Attendance: 1120; Umpires: HP: Dwayne Finley, 1B: Steve Miller, 2B: Cory Spangler, 3B: Tim Farwig, LF: Tracy Roles, RF: Shannon Bunger |
| Wednesday, May 28; 3:30 pm Game 16 | WP: Sam Haynes (9–2) | Boxscore | LP: Julian Merryweather (12–3) | Harris Field; Attendance: 1120; Umpires: HP: Dwayne Finley, 1B: Steve Miller, 2B: Cory Spangler, 3B: Tim Farwig, LF: Tracy Roles, RF: Shannon Bunger |
| Wednesday, May 28; 3:30 pm Game 16 | HR: Jose Ruiz (15) | Boxscore | HR: Steven Knudson (15) | Harris Field; Attendance: 1120; Umpires: HP: Dwayne Finley, 1B: Steve Miller, 2B: Cory Spangler, 3B: Tim Farwig, LF: Tracy Roles, RF: Shannon Bunger |

| Wednesday, May 28; 6:30 pm Game 17 | (10) Cumberland | 5–6 | (2) Lewis–Clark State | Harris Field; Attendance: 3890; Umpires: HP: Tracy Roles, 1B: Tim Farwig, 2B; Shannon Bunger, 3B: Steve Miller, LF: Cory Spangler, RF: Dwayne Finley |
| Wednesday, May 28; 6:30 pm Game 17 | LP: Kevin P. Greene (9–2) | Boxscore | WP: David Murillo (5–1) | Harris Field; Attendance: 3890; Umpires: HP: Tracy Roles, 1B: Tim Farwig, 2B; Shannon Bunger, 3B: Steve Miller, LF: Cory Spangler, RF: Dwayne Finley |
| Wednesday, May 28; 6:30 pm Game 17 | HR: Sam Lind (16) | Boxscore | | Harris Field; Attendance: 3890; Umpires: HP: Tracy Roles, 1B: Tim Farwig, 2B; Shannon Bunger, 3B: Steve Miller, LF: Cory Spangler, RF: Dwayne Finley |

| Thursday, May 29; 6:30 pm Game 18 | (2) Lewis–Clark State | 9–5 | (3) Oklahoma Wesleyan | Harris Field; Attendance: 4330; Umpires: HP: Steve Miller, 1B: Cory Spangler, 2B: Tracy Roles, 3B: Shannon Bunger, LF: Tim Farwig, RF: Dwayne Finley |
| Thursday, May 29; 6:30 pm Game 18 | WP: Michael Noteware (7–2) | Boxscore | LP: Sam Haynes (9–3) | Harris Field; Attendance: 4330; Umpires: HP: Steve Miller, 1B: Cory Spangler, 2B: Tracy Roles, 3B: Shannon Bunger, LF: Tim Farwig, RF: Dwayne Finley |
| Thursday, May 29; 6:30 pm Game 18 | HR: Ryan Sells (11) | Boxscore | | Harris Field; Attendance: 4330; Umpires: HP: Steve Miller, 1B: Cory Spangler, 2B: Tracy Roles, 3B: Shannon Bunger, LF: Tim Farwig, RF: Dwayne Finley |

==== Championship Game ====
Friday, May 30 6:30 pm PDT at Harris Field Game 19
| Team | 1 | 2 | 3 | 4 | 5 | 6 | 7 | 8 | 9 | R | H | E |
|---|---|---|---|---|---|---|---|---|---|---|---|---|
| Lewis–Clark State | 0 | 0 | 0 | 0 | 0 | 0 | 0 | 0 | 0 | 0 | 6 | 1 |
| Cumberland | 0 | 2 | 0 | 0 | 0 | 0 | 1 | 0 | X | 3 | 5 | 3 |
WP: Anthony Gomez (7–4) LP: Ty Jackson (4–1); Attendance: 5010; Umpires: HP: Tim Farwig, 1B: Tracy Roles, 2B: Dwayne Finley, 3B: Cory Spangler, LF: Shannon Bunger, RF: Steve Miller; Boxscore

== See also ==
- 2014 NAIA softball tournament
- 2014 NCAA Division I baseball tournament
- 2014 NCAA Division II baseball tournament
- 2014 NCAA Division III baseball tournament
