= 2013 NAIA baseball tournament =

- Teams: 46
- Finals site: Harris Field; Lewiston, Idaho
- Champions: Faulkner (AL) (1st title)
- Winning coach: Patrick McCarthy
- MVP: Johnny Shuttlesworth (Faulkner)

The 2013 NAIA baseball tournament was the 57th edition of the NAIA baseball championship. The 46-team tournament began on May 9 with Opening Round games across nine different sites and concluded with the 2013 NAIA World Series in Lewiston, Idaho that began on May 24 and ended on May 31.

Top-seeded Faulkner (AL) defeated Lewis–Clark State (ID) 11–4 in the championship game for their 1st title in program history. This is the most recent NAIA World Series where the top seed went undefeated in the World Series.

The 46 participating teams were selected from all eligible NAIA teams with the World Series host receiving an automatic bid to the NAIA World Series. The remaining 45 teams participated in the Opening Round with 29 teams being awarded automatic bids as either champions and/or runners-up of their conferences, and 16 teams were selected at-large, which were determined by the final NAIA Baseball Coaches' Top 25 Poll. Teams were then placed into one of nine pre-determined Opening Round sites of five teams a piece, each of which is conducted via a double-elimination tournament. The winners of each of the Opening Round sites plus the World Series host team participated in the NAIA World Series.

== Tournament procedure ==
A total of 46 teams entered the tournament. As World Series host, Lewis–Clark State received an automatic bid into the NAIA World Series. 29 automatic bids were determined by either winning their conference's regular season championship, conference tournament, and/or conference tournament runner-up. The other 16 bids were at-large, with selections determined by the final NAIA Baseball Coaches' Top 25 Poll.

== Opening round hosts ==
On April 15, the NAIA announced the nine opening round host sites, which were played from May 9–13.

Opening Round hosts

| Venue(s) | Location(s) | Host(s) |
|---|---|---|
| Hunter Wright Stadium | Kingsport, TN | Appalachian Athletic Conference |
| Silver Cross Field | Joliet, IL | Chicagoland Collegiate Athletic Conference |
| Sliwa Stadium | Daytona Beach, FL | Embry–Riddle Aeronautical University (FL) |
| Harrison Field | Montgomery, AL | Faulkner University |
| Olympic Field | Cleveland, TN | Lee University |
| Jim Wade Stadium | Oklahoma City, OK | Oklahoma City University |
| Diamond Sports Complex | Claremore, OK | Rogers State University |
| Reese Field | Santa Clarita, CA | The Master's College |
| Milton Wheeler Field | Hattiesburg, MS | William Carey University |

== Bids ==
=== Automatic ===
| School | Conference | Record | Berth | Last NAIA Appearance |
|---|---|---|---|---|
| Avila (MO) | Heart | 27–20 | Tournament runner-up | 2012 (Cleveland Bracket) |
| Benedictine–Springfield (IL) | American Midwest | 23–23 | Tournament champion | First appearance |
| Cal State San Marcos | A.I.I. | 35–10 | Tournament champion | 2011 (Riverside Bracket) |
| Central Methodist (MO) | American Midwest | 25–11 | Tournament champion | First appearance |
| Concordia (OR) | A.I.I./Cal Pac/Cascade | 28–26 | Tournament champion | 2008 (Region I Tournament) |
| Cumberland (TN) | Mid-South | 39–17–1 | Regular season champion | 2011 (Paducah Bracket) |
| Embry–Riddle (FL) | The Sun | 45–13 | Tournament champion | 2012 NAIA World Series |
| Faulkner (AL) | Southern States | 47–10 | Tournament co-champion | 2012 NAIA World Series |
| Grand View (IA) | Midwest | 25–19 | Tournament champion | 2012 (Paducah Bracket) |
| Indiana Tech | Wolverine-Hoosier | 31–16 | Tournament champion | 2012 (Kingsport Bracket) |
| Jamestown (ND) | A.I.I./Frontier | 28–9 | Tournament champion | 2011 (Joliet Bracket) |
| Judson (IL) | Chicagoland | 44–15 | Tournament champion | 2012 (Hutchinson Bracket) |
| Lee (TN) | Southern States | 46–10 | Tournament co-champion | 2012 (Cleveland Bracket) |
| Lewis-Clark State (ID) | A.I.I./Cal Pac/Cascade | 41–13 | World Series host | 2012 NAIA World Series |
| Lindsey Wilson (KY) | Mid-South | 42–17 | Tournament champion | 2012 (Paducah Bracket) |
| LSU–Shreveport | Red River | 40–16 | Tournament champion | 2012 NAIA World Series |
| Lubbock Christian (TX) | Sooner | 42–15 | Tournament champion | 2012 (Oklahoma City Bracket) |
| Martin Methodist (TN) | Gulf Coast/TranSouth | 38–17 | Tournament champion | 2008 (Region XI Tournament) |
| Midland (NE) (Note: Midland (NE) was known as Midland Lutheran when they last appeared in an NAIA tournament.) | Great Plains | 31–24 | Tournament runner-up | 2006 (Region III Tournament) |
| Mount Vernon Nazarene (OH) | Crossroads | 32–15 | Tournament runner-up | 2012 (Marion Bracket) |
| Northwestern (IA) | Great Plains | 31–17 | Tournament champion | 2010 (Group 5 Bracket) |
| Point Park (PA) | Kentucky | 39–14 | Tournament champion | 2012 NAIA World Series |
| USC–Beaufort | The Sun | 26–23 | Tournament runner-up | 2012 NAIA World Series |
| Sterling (KS) | Kansas | 46–12 | Tournament champion | 2012 (Oklahoma City Bracket) |
| Taylor (IN) | Crossroads | 34–12 | Tournament champion | 2012 (Marion Bracket) |
| Tennessee Wesleyan | Appalachian | 43–16 | Tournament champion | 2012 NAIA World Series |
| Texas Wesleyan | Red River | 40–16 | Tournament runner-up | 2010 (Group 9 Bracket) |
| The Master's (CA) | Golden State | 40–15 | Tournament champion | 2009 (Group 3 Bracket) |
| Trinity Christian (IL) | Chicagoland | 25–22 | Tournament runner-up | First appearance |
| York (NE) | Midlands | 41–10 | Tournament champion | 2012 (Oklahoma City Bracket) |

=== At–Large ===
| School | Conference | Record | Last NAIA Appearance |
|---|---|---|---|
| Ave Maria (FL) | The Sun | 37–19 | First appearance |
| Bellevue (NE) | Midlands | 44–8–1 | 2012 (Paducah Bracket) |
| Concordia (CA) | Golden State | 34–19 | 2012 (Marion Bracket) |
| Georgetown (KY) | Mid-South | 35–17 | 2012 (Kingsport Bracket) |
| Lyon (AR) | American Midwest | 41–14 | First appearance |
| Madonna (MI) | Wolverine-Hoosier | 36–9 | 2010 (Group 2 Bracket) |
| Mayville State (ND) | A.I.I./Frontier | 34–6–1 | 2010 (Group 1 Bracket) |
| Missouri Baptist | American Midwest | 31–11 | 2012 (Cleveland Bracket) |
| Northwood (TX) | Red River | 40–11 | 2011 (Lubbock Bracket) |
| Oklahoma Baptist | Sooner | 41–17 | 2012 (Hutchinson Bracket) |
| Oklahoma City | Sooner | 47–11 | 2012 NAIA World Series |
| Rogers State (OK) | Sooner | 31–22 | 2012 NAIA World Series |
| San Diego Christian (CA) | Golden State | 37–18 | First appearance |
| Science & Arts (OK) | Sooner | 40–17 | First appearance |
| Tabor (KS) | Kansas | 38–14 | 2012 (Hutchinson Bracket) |
| William Carey (MS) | Southern States | 35–21 | 2011 (Daytona Beach Bracket) |

== Opening Round ==
=== Claremore Bracket ===
Hosted by Rogers State (OK) at Diamond Sports Complex

First round
4 | Rogers State (OK) | 8
5 | Midland (NE) | 4
First round
5 | Midland | 2
2 | Bellevue | 7

Second round
1 | Lubbock Christian (TX) | 5
4 | Rogers State | 7
2 | Bellevue (NE) | 0
3 | Lyon (AR) | 3
Second round
1 | Lubbock Christian | 3
2 | Bellevue | 1

Semifinals
4 | Rogers State | 16
3 | Lyon | 2
Semifinals
3 | Lyon | 7
1 | Lubbock Christian | 15

Finals
4 | Rogers State | 8 | –
1 | Lubbock Christian | 4 | –

=== Cleveland Bracket ===
Hosted by Lee (TN) at Olympic Field

First round
4 | Avila (MO) | 7
5 | Grand View (IA) | 0
First round
5 | Grand View | 6
3 | LSU–Shreveport | 3

Second round
1 | Lee (TN) | 12
4 | Avila | 3
2 | Madonna (MI) | 8
3 | LSU–Shreveport | 0
Second round
4 | Avila | 12
5 | Grand View | 10

Semifinals
1 | Lee | 9
2 | Madonna | 2
Semifinals
2 | Madonna | 2
4 | Avila | 3

Finals
1 | Lee | 14 | –
4 | Avila | 0 | –

=== Daytona Beach Bracket ===
Hosted by Embry–Riddle (FL) at Sliwa Stadium

First round
4 | Ave Maria (FL) | 3^{10}
5 | Martin Methodist (TN) | 2
First round
5 | Martin Methodist | 2
3 | Lindsey Wilson | 6

Second round
1 | Embry–Riddle (FL) | 6
4 | Ave Maria | 2
2 | Concordia (CA) | 4
3 | Lindsey Wilson (KY) | 1
Second round
4 | Ave Maria | 1
3 | Lindsey Wilson | 2

Semifinals
1 | Embry–Riddle (FL) | 7
2 | Concordia (CA) | 6
Semifinals
2 | Concordia (CA) | 1
3 | Lindsey Wilson | 2

Finals
1 | Embry–Riddle (FL) | 6 | –
3 | Lindsey Wilson | 5 | –

=== Hattiesburg Bracket ===
Hosted by William Carey (MS) at Milton Wheeler Field

First round
4 | Central Methodist (MO) | 2
5 | USC–Beaufort | 5
First round
4 | Central Methodist | 6
2 | Oklahoma Baptist | 7

Second round
1 | Northwood (TX) | 7
5 | USC–Beaufort | 5
2 | Oklahoma Baptist | 3
3 | William Carey (MS) | 7
Second round
5 | USC–Beaufort | 2
2 | Oklahoma Baptist | 3^{10}

Semifinals
1 | Northwood (TX) | 9
3 | William Carey | 0
Semifinals
3 | William Carey | 5
2 | Oklahoma Baptist | 13

Finals
1 | Northwood (TX) | 7 | –
2 | Oklahoma Baptist | 4 | –

=== Joliet Bracket ===
Hosted by the Chicagoland Collegiate Athletic Conference at Silver Cross Field

First round
4 | Mayville State (ND) | 4
5 | Trinity Christian (IL) | 1
First round
5 | Trinity Christian | 2
2 | Cumberland (TN) | 18

Second round
1 | York (NE) | 5
4 | Mayville State | 1
2 | Cumberland (TN) | 4
3 | Judson (IL) | 7
Second round
4 | Mayville State | 5
2 | Cumberland (TN) | 6

Semifinals
1 | York | 5
3 | Judson | 0
Semifinals
3 | Judson | 4^{10}
2 | Cumberland (TN) | 3

Finals
1 | York | 4 | –
3 | Judson | 3 | –

=== Kingsport Bracket ===
Hosted by the Appalachian Athletic Conference at Hunter Wright Stadium

First round
4 | Taylor (IN) | 10
5 | Benedictine–Springfield (IL) | 2
First round
5 | Benedictine–Springfield | 4
2 | Point Park | 1

Second round
1 | Tennessee Wesleyan | 12
4 | Taylor | 4
2 | Point Park (PA) | 6
3 | Missouri Baptist | 13
Second round
4 | Taylor | 4
5 | Benedictine–Springfield | 6

Semifinals
1 | Tennessee Wesleyan | 6
3 | Missouri Baptist | 5
Semifinals
3 | Missouri Baptist | 8
5 | Benedictine–Springfield | 4

Finals
1 | Tennessee Wesleyan | 3 | 3
3 | Missouri Baptist | 6 | 4^{19}

=== Montgomery Bracket ===
Hosted by Faulkner (AL) at Harrison Field

First round
4 | Indiana Tech | 7
5 | Mount Vernon Nazarene (OH) | 4
First round
5 | Mount Vernon Nazarene | 2
3 | Georgetown | 12

Second round
1 | Faulkner (AL) | 16
4 | Indiana Tech | 2
2 | Texas Wesleyan | 9
3 | Georgetown (KY) | 1
Second round
4 | Indiana Tech | 4
3 | Georgetown | 3

Semifinals
1 | Faulkner | 2
2 | Texas Wesleyan | 4^{10}
Semifinals
1 | Faulkner | 15
4 | Indiana Tech | 2

Finals
2 | Texas Wesleyan | 1 | 2
1 | Faulkner | 9 | 14

=== Oklahoma City Bracket ===
Hosted by Oklahoma City at Jim Wade Stadium

First round
4 | Northwestern (IA) | 5
5 | Jamestown (ND) | 8^{14}
First round
4 | Northwestern (IA) | 4
3 | Science & Arts | 5

Second round
1 | Oklahoma City | 0
5 | Jamestown | 3
2 | Sterling (KS) | 8
3 | Science & Arts (OK) | 5
Second round
1 | Oklahoma City | 7^{11}
3 | Science & Arts | 6

Semifinals
5 | Jamestown | 3
2 | Sterling | 13
Semifinals
5 | Jamestown | 0
1 | Oklahoma City | 4

Finals
2 | Sterling | 1 | –
1 | Oklahoma City | 0 | –

=== Santa Clarita Bracket ===
Hosted by The Master's (CA) at Reese Field

First round
4 | Tabor (KS) | 8^{10}
5 | Concorida (OR) | 7
First round
5 | Concordia (OR) | 13
2 | Cal State San Marcos | 3

Second round
1 | The Master's (CA) | 1
4 | Tabor | 0
2 | Cal State San Marcos | 1
3 | San Diego Christian (CA) | 6
Second round
4 | Tabor | 6
5 | Concordia (OR) | 5

Semifinals
1 | The Master's | 3
3 | San Diego Christian | 1
Semifinals
3 | San Diego Christian | 9^{10}
4 | Tabor | 7

Finals
1 | The Master's | 11 | –
3 | San Diego Christian | 7 | –

== NAIA World Series ==
The NAIA World Series was held at Harris Field in Lewiston, Idaho.

=== Participants ===
| School | Conference | Record | Head Coach | Bracket | Previous NAIA WS Appearances | Best NAIA WS Finish | NAIA WS Record |
|---|---|---|---|---|---|---|---|
| Embry–Riddle (FL) | The Sun | 48–13 | Randy Stegall | Daytona Beach | 11 (last: 2012) | 2nd (2005) | 17–22 |
| Faulkner (AL) | Southern States | 51–11 | Patrick McCarthy | Montgomery | 1 (last: 2011) | T-9th (2011) | 0–2 |
| Lee (TN) | Southern States | 49–10 | Mark Brew | Cleveland | 7 (last: 2012) | 2nd (2008, 2010) | 17–14 |
| Lewis–Clark State (ID) | Frontier | 41–13 | Jeremiah Robbins | n/a | 31 (last: 2012) | 1st (1984, 1985, 1987, 1988, 1989, 1990, 1991, 1992, 1996, 1999, 2000, 2002, 2003, 2006, 2007, 2008) | 120–39 |
| Missouri Baptist | American Midwest | 35–12 | Eddie Uschold | Kingsport | none | none | 0–0 |
| Northwood (TX) | Red River | 43–11 | Jeremy Kennedy | Hattiesburg | none | none | 0–0 |
| Rogers State (OK) | Sooner | 35–22 | Ron Bradley | Claremore | 1 (last: 2012) | 2nd (2012) | 4–2 |
| Sterling (KS) | Kansas | 48–12 | Adrian Dinkel | Oklahoma City | none | none | 0–0 |
| The Master's (CA) | Golden State | 43–15 | Monte Brooks | Santa Clarita | 1 (last: 2000) | 3rd (2000) | 2–2 |
| York (NE) | Midlands | 44–10 | Nick Harlan | Joliet | none | none | 0–0 |

=== Bracket ===
==== Preliminary Bracket ====
First round Friday, May 24
8 | Sterling | 3
9 | Missouri Baptist | 8
7 | Lewis–Clark State | 6
10 | Rogers State | 1
First round Saturday, May 25; Losers eliminated
8 | Sterling | 0
4 | Northwood (TX) | 1
6 | York | 1
10 | Rogers State | 4

First round Friday, May 24; Second round Saturday, May 25
1 | Faulkner | 2
9 | Missouri Baptist | 0
4 | Northwood (TX) | 3
5 | The Master's | 4
2 | Lee | 14
7 | Lewis–Clark State | 11
3 | Embry–Riddle (FL) | 8
6 | York | 3
Second round Monday, May 27; Losers eliminated
7 | Lewis–Clark State | 9
4 | Northwood (TX) | 5
9 | Missouri Baptist | 5
10 | Rogers State | 4

Third round Monday, May 27; Winners to Championship Bracket
1 | Faulkner | 7
5 | The Master's | 6
2 | Lee | 4
3 | Embry–Riddle (FL) | 5
Third round Tuesday, May 28; Winners to Championship Bracket
5 | The Master's | 2
7 | Lewis–Clark State | 3
2 | Lee | 12
9 | Missouri Baptist | 2

Fourth Round; Tuesday, May 28
1 | Faulkner | 10
3 | Embry–Riddle (FL) | 3

==== Championship Bracket ====
Semifinals; Wednesday, May 29
1 | Faulkner | 8
2 | Lee | 4
3 | Embry–Riddle (FL) | 7
7 | Lewis–Clark State | 13

Final; Thursday, May 30
1 | Faulkner | 11 | –
7 | Lewis–Clark State | 4 | –

=== Game Results ===
All game times are listed in Pacific Daylight Time (UTC−07:00).

==== Preliminary Bracket ====
| Friday, May 24; 9:00 am Game 1 | (8) Sterling | 3–8 | (9) Missouri Baptist | Harris Field; Attendance: 1405; Umpires: HP: Cory Spangler, 1B: Steve Miller, 2B: Tracy Roles, 3B: Tim Farwig |
| Friday, May 24; 9:00 am Game 1 | LP: Daniel Cloteaux (10–4) | Boxscore | WP: Ethan Gibbons (11–0) | Harris Field; Attendance: 1405; Umpires: HP: Cory Spangler, 1B: Steve Miller, 2B: Tracy Roles, 3B: Tim Farwig |

| Friday, May 24; 12:00 pm Game 2 | (5) The Master's | 4–3 | (4) Northwood (TX) | Harris Field; Attendance: 1220; Umpires: HP: Tracy Roles, 1B: Tim Farwig, 2B: Cory Spangler, 3B: Steve Miller |
| Friday, May 24; 12:00 pm Game 2 | WP: A.J. Work (13–4); Sv: Andrew Klausmeier (1) | Boxscore | LP: Roman Gomez (9–3) | Harris Field; Attendance: 1220; Umpires: HP: Tracy Roles, 1B: Tim Farwig, 2B: Cory Spangler, 3B: Steve Miller |
| Friday, May 24; 12:00 pm Game 2 | HR: Chris Talley (4) | Boxscore | | Harris Field; Attendance: 1220; Umpires: HP: Tracy Roles, 1B: Tim Farwig, 2B: Cory Spangler, 3B: Steve Miller |

| Friday, May 24; 3:00 pm Game 3 | (3) Embry–Riddle (FL) | 8–3 | (6) York | Harris Field; Attendance: 780; Umpires: HP: Sean Bolte, 1B: Dwayne Finley, 2B: Craig Mirr, 3B: Rich Stonum |
| Friday, May 24; 3:00 pm Game 3 | WP: Aaron Conyers (9–3) | Boxscore | LP: Kevin Maloney (12–1) | Harris Field; Attendance: 780; Umpires: HP: Sean Bolte, 1B: Dwayne Finley, 2B: Craig Mirr, 3B: Rich Stonum |

| Friday, May 24; 7:00 pm Game 4 | (7) Lewis–Clark State | 6–1 | (10) Rogers State | Harris Field; Umpires: HP: Eric Johansen, 1B: Tim Farwig, 2B: Shannon Bunger, 3B: Dwayne Finley |
| Friday, May 24; 7:00 pm Game 4 | WP: Anthony Armanino (10–3) | Boxscore | LP: Shawn Spainhoward (8–5) | Harris Field; Umpires: HP: Eric Johansen, 1B: Tim Farwig, 2B: Shannon Bunger, 3B: Dwayne Finley |
| Friday, May 24; 7:00 pm Game 4 | HR: Kyle Blackwell 2 (2) | Boxscore | | Harris Field; Umpires: HP: Eric Johansen, 1B: Tim Farwig, 2B: Shannon Bunger, 3B: Dwayne Finley |

| Saturday, May 25; 9:00 am Game 5 | (4) Northwood | 1–0 | (8) Sterling | Harris Field; Attendance: 620; Umpires: HP: Dwayne Finley, 1B: Craig Mirr, 2B: Rich Stonum, 3B: Sean Bolte |
| Saturday, May 25; 9:00 am Game 5 | WP: Cody Faulkner (7–2) | Boxscore | LP: Steven Cazares (9–2) | Harris Field; Attendance: 620; Umpires: HP: Dwayne Finley, 1B: Craig Mirr, 2B: Rich Stonum, 3B: Sean Bolte |

Northwood (TX) pitcher Cody Faulkner pitched the fourth no-hitter in NAIA World Series history

| Saturday, May 25; 12:00 pm Game 6 | (6) York | 1–4 | (10) Rogers State | Harris Field; Attendance: 1160; Umpires: HP: Rich Stonum, 1B: Sean Bolte, 2B: Dwayne Finley, 3B: Craig Mirr |
| Saturday, May 25; 12:00 pm Game 6 | LP: Tom Korn (10–3) | Boxscore | WP: Brandon Bargas (9–5); Sv: Mason Marquette (3) | Harris Field; Attendance: 1160; Umpires: HP: Rich Stonum, 1B: Sean Bolte, 2B: Dwayne Finley, 3B: Craig Mirr |

| Saturday, May 25; 3:00 pm Game 7 | (9) Missouri Baptist | 0–2 | (1) Faulkner | Harris Field; Attendance: 1410; Umpires: HP: Steve Miller, 1B: Cory Spangler, 2B: Tim Farwig, 3B: Tracy Roles |
| Saturday, May 25; 3:00 pm Game 7 | LP: Julien Soucy (5–3) | Boxscore | WP: Johnny Shuttlesworth (15–1); Sv: Brad Griffis (6) | Harris Field; Attendance: 1410; Umpires: HP: Steve Miller, 1B: Cory Spangler, 2B: Tim Farwig, 3B: Tracy Roles |

| Saturday, May 25; 6:30 pm Game 8 | (2) Lee | 14–11 | (7) Lewis–Clark State | Harris Field; Attendance: 4790; Umpires: HP: Tim Farwig, 1B: Tracy Roles, 2B: Steve Miller, 3B: Cory Spangler |
| Saturday, May 25; 6:30 pm Game 8 | WP: Keegan Yuhl (4–1) | Boxscore | LP: Sal Arena (1–4) | Harris Field; Attendance: 4790; Umpires: HP: Tim Farwig, 1B: Tracy Roles, 2B: Steve Miller, 3B: Cory Spangler |
| Saturday, May 25; 6:30 pm Game 8 | HR: Danny Canela (7), Karsten Strieby (3) | Boxscore | | Harris Field; Attendance: 4790; Umpires: HP: Tim Farwig, 1B: Tracy Roles, 2B: Steve Miller, 3B: Cory Spangler |

| Monday, May 27; 9:00 am Game 9 | (10) Rogers State | 4–5 | (9) Missouri Baptist | Harris Field; Attendance: 515; Umpires: HP: Dwayne Finley, 1B: Craig Mirr, 2B: Steve Miller, 3B: Cory Spangler |
| Monday, May 27; 9:00 am Game 9 | LP: Jesse Baird (3–3) | Boxscore | WP: Matt Marsh (3–4) | Harris Field; Attendance: 515; Umpires: HP: Dwayne Finley, 1B: Craig Mirr, 2B: Steve Miller, 3B: Cory Spangler |
| Monday, May 27; 9:00 am Game 9 | HR: Ramcy Lora (5) | Boxscore | | Harris Field; Attendance: 515; Umpires: HP: Dwayne Finley, 1B: Craig Mirr, 2B: Steve Miller, 3B: Cory Spangler |

| Monday, May 27; 12:00 pm Game 10 | (7) Lewis–Clark State | 9–5 | (4) Northwood | Harris Field; Attendance: 4540; Umpires: HP: Steve Miller, 1B: Cory Spangler, 2B: Dwayne Finley, 3B: Craig Mirr |
| Monday, May 27; 12:00 pm Game 10 | WP: Steve Thompson (5–5); Sv: Garrett Wilson (1) | Boxscore | LP: Clayton Woodruff (5–3) | Harris Field; Attendance: 4540; Umpires: HP: Steve Miller, 1B: Cory Spangler, 2B: Dwayne Finley, 3B: Craig Mirr |

| Monday, May 27; 3:00 pm Game 11 | (1) Faulkner | 7–6 | (5) The Master's | Harris Field; Attendance: 740; Umpires: HP: Sean Bolte, 1B: Rich Stonum, 2B: Tracy Roles, 3B: Tim Farwig |
| Monday, May 27; 3:00 pm Game 11 | WP: Will Dismukes (12–2); Sv: Brad Griffis (7) | Boxscore | LP: Tyler Elrod (8–5) | Harris Field; Attendance: 740; Umpires: HP: Sean Bolte, 1B: Rich Stonum, 2B: Tracy Roles, 3B: Tim Farwig |
| Monday, May 27; 3:00 pm Game 11 | HR: David Bishop (9) | Boxscore | | Harris Field; Attendance: 740; Umpires: HP: Sean Bolte, 1B: Rich Stonum, 2B: Tracy Roles, 3B: Tim Farwig |

| Monday, May 27; 6:30 pm Game 12 | (2) Lee | 4–5 | (3) Embry–Riddle (FL) | Harris Field; Attendance: 760; Umpires: HP: Tracy Roles, 1B: Tim Farwig, 2B: Sean Bolte, 3B: Rich Stonum |
| Monday, May 27; 6:30 pm Game 12 | LP: Alex Moore (1–3) | Boxscore | WP: Jon Rapose (5–1) | Harris Field; Attendance: 760; Umpires: HP: Tracy Roles, 1B: Tim Farwig, 2B: Sean Bolte, 3B: Rich Stonum |

| Tuesday, May 28; 12:00 pm Game 13 | (5) The Master's | 2–3 | (7) Lewis–Clark State | Harris Field; Attendance: 1710; Umpires: HP: Craig Mirr, 1B: Tim Farwig, 2B: Steve Miller, 3B: Dwayne Finley |
| Tuesday, May 28; 12:00 pm Game 13 | LP: James Scott (7–5) | Boxscore | WP: David Murillo (5–0) | Harris Field; Attendance: 1710; Umpires: HP: Craig Mirr, 1B: Tim Farwig, 2B: Steve Miller, 3B: Dwayne Finley |

| Tuesday, May 28; 3:00 pm Game 14 | (9) Missouri Baptist | 2–12 | (2) Lee | Harris Field; Attendance: 510 |
| Tuesday, May 28; 3:00 pm Game 14 | LP: Ethan Gibbons (11–1) | Boxscore | WP: Clint Terry (11–1) | Harris Field; Attendance: 510 |
| Tuesday, May 28; 3:00 pm Game 14 | | Boxscore | HR: Brady Renner (4), Josh Silver (4), Corey Davis (9) | Harris Field; Attendance: 510 |

| Tuesday, May 28; 6:30 pm Game 15 | (3) Embry–Riddle (FL) | 3–10 | (1) Faulkner | Harris Field; Attendance: 1390; Umpires: HP: Rich Stonum, 1B: Steve Miller, 2B: Dwayne Finley, 3B: Tracy Roles |
| Tuesday, May 28; 6:30 pm Game 15 | LP: Kevin Maloney (12–2) | Boxscore | WP: Tyler Carter (1–4) | Harris Field; Attendance: 1390; Umpires: HP: Rich Stonum, 1B: Steve Miller, 2B: Dwayne Finley, 3B: Tracy Roles |
| Tuesday, May 28; 6:30 pm Game 15 | | Boxscore | HR: Sergio Sanchez (7), David Bishop (10), Antonio Kendrick (2) | Harris Field; Attendance: 1390; Umpires: HP: Rich Stonum, 1B: Steve Miller, 2B: Dwayne Finley, 3B: Tracy Roles |

==== Championship Bracket ====
| Wednesday, May 29; 3:30 pm Game 16 | (7) Lewis–Clark State | 13–7 | (3) Embry–Riddle (FL) | Harris Field; Attendance: 2295; Umpires: HP: Steve Miller, 1B: Tracy Roles, 2B: Cory Spangler, 3B: Craig Mirr, LF: Dwayne Finley, RF: Tim Farwig |
| Wednesday, May 29; 3:30 pm Game 16 | WP: Anthony Armanino (11–3) | Boxscore | LP: Chad Modomo (7–3) | Harris Field; Attendance: 2295; Umpires: HP: Steve Miller, 1B: Tracy Roles, 2B: Cory Spangler, 3B: Craig Mirr, LF: Dwayne Finley, RF: Tim Farwig |
| Wednesday, May 29; 3:30 pm Game 16 | HR: Cody Lavalli (10) | Boxscore | HR: Kyle Chastain (3) | Harris Field; Attendance: 2295; Umpires: HP: Steve Miller, 1B: Tracy Roles, 2B: Cory Spangler, 3B: Craig Mirr, LF: Dwayne Finley, RF: Tim Farwig |

| Wednesday, May 29; 7:00 pm Game 17 | (1) Faulkner | 8–4 | (2) Lee | Harris Field; Attendance: 555; Umpires: HP: Tim Farwig, 1B: Cory Spangler, 2B; Tracy Roles, 3B: Dwayne Finley, LF: Craig Mirr, RF: Steve Miller |
| Wednesday, May 29; 7:00 pm Game 17 | WP: Julian Esquibel (11–2) | Boxscore | LP: Myles Smith (11–4) | Harris Field; Attendance: 555; Umpires: HP: Tim Farwig, 1B: Cory Spangler, 2B; Tracy Roles, 3B: Dwayne Finley, LF: Craig Mirr, RF: Steve Miller |
| Wednesday, May 29; 7:00 pm Game 17 | | Boxscore | HR: Brandon Rader (4) | Harris Field; Attendance: 555; Umpires: HP: Tim Farwig, 1B: Cory Spangler, 2B; Tracy Roles, 3B: Dwayne Finley, LF: Craig Mirr, RF: Steve Miller |

==== Championship Game ====
Thursday, May 30 6:35 pm PDT at Harris Field Game 18
| Team | 1 | 2 | 3 | 4 | 5 | 6 | 7 | 8 | 9 | R | H | E |
|---|---|---|---|---|---|---|---|---|---|---|---|---|
| Faulkner | 0 | 6 | 0 | 2 | 0 | 0 | 2 | 1 | 0 | 11 | 16 | 3 |
| Lewis–Clark State | 0 | 2 | 0 | 0 | 0 | 0 | 0 | 2 | 0 | 4 | 14 | 1 |
WP: Johnny Shuttlesworth (16–1) LP: Ryan Sells (2–1); Home runs: FU: David Bishop (11); LCSC: None; Attendance: 4265; Umpires: HP: Craig Mirr, 1B: Steve Miller, 2B: Tim Farwig, 3B: Cory Spangler, LF: Tracy Roles, RF: Dwayne Finley; Boxscore

== See also ==
- 2013 NAIA softball tournament
- 2013 NCAA Division I baseball tournament
- 2013 NCAA Division II baseball tournament
- 2013 NCAA Division III baseball tournament
