= 2012 NAIA baseball tournament =

- Teams: 46
- Finals site: Harris Field; Lewiston, Idaho
- Champions: Tennessee Wesleyan (1st title)
- Winning coach: Billy Berry
- MVP: Jordan Guida (Tennessee Wesleyan)

The 2012 NAIA baseball tournament was the 56th edition of the NAIA baseball championship. The 46-team tournament began on May 10 with Opening Round games across nine different sites and concluded with the 2012 NAIA World Series in Lewiston, Idaho that began on May 25 and ended on June 1. Tennessee Wesleyan defeated Rogers State (OK) 10–6 in the championship game for their 1st title in program history.

The 46 participating teams were selected from all eligible NAIA teams with the World Series host receiving an automatic bid to the NAIA World Series. The remaining 45 teams participated in the Opening Round with 29 teams being awarded automatic bids as either champions and/or runners-up of their conferences, and 16 teams were selected at-large, which were determined by the final NAIA Baseball Coaches' Top 25 Poll. Teams were then placed into one of nine pre-determined Opening Round sites of five teams a piece, each of which is conducted via a double-elimination tournament. The winners of each of the Opening Round sites plus the World Series host team participated in the NAIA World Series.

== Tournament procedure ==
A total of 46 teams entered the tournament. As World Series host, Lewis–Clark State received an automatic bid into the NAIA World Series. 29 automatic bids were determined by either winning their conference's regular season championship, conference tournament, and/or conference tournament runner-up. The other 16 bids were at-large, with selections determined by the final NAIA Baseball Coaches' Top 25 Poll.

== Opening round hosts ==
On April 15, the NAIA announced the nine opening round host sites, which were played from May 10–14.

Opening Round hosts

Venue(s)	Location(s)	Host(s)
Hunter Wright Stadium	Kingsport, TN	Appalachian Athletic Conference
Cougar Baseball Complex	Azusa, CA	Azusa Pacific University
Sliwa Stadium	Daytona Beach, FL	Embry–Riddle Aeronautical University (FL)
Olympic Field	Cleveland, TN	Lee University
IWU Wildcat Field	Marion, IN	Mid-Central College Conference
Jim Wade Stadium	Oklahoma City, OK	Oklahoma City University
J. Polk Brooks Stadium	Paducah, KY	Paducah Convention & Visitors Bureau
Hobart-Detter Field	Hutchinson, KS	Tabor College
Richard Gray Baseball Complex	Hardeeville, SC	University of South Carolina Beaufort

== Bids ==
=== Automatic ===
School	Conference	Record	Berth	Last NAIA Appearance
Arizona Christian	A.I.I.	33–21	Tournament champion	First appearance
Asbury (KY)	NAIA East Group	18–37	Tournament champion	First appearance
Avila (MO)	Heart	39–14	Regular season champion	2010 (Group 4 Bracket)
Bacone (OK)	Red River	28–23	Tournament runner-up	2004 (Region VI Tournament)
Concordia (CA)	Golden State	37–16	Tournament champion	2011 NAIA World Series
Dakota State (SD)	A.I.I.	28–26	Tournament runner-up	2007 (Region III Tournament)
Doane (NE)	Great Plains	33–19	Regular season champion	2011 (Oklahoma City Bracket)
Embry–Riddle (FL)	The Sun	40–16	Regular season champion	2011 NAIA World Series
Faulkner (AL)	Southern States	49–11	Tournament runner-up	2011 NAIA World Series
Georgetown (KY)	Mid-South	45–9	Tournament champion	2007 (Region XI Tournament)
Grand View (IA)	Midwest	27–27	Tournament champion	2010 (Group 5 Bracket)
Judson (IL)	Chicagoland	46–12	Regular season champion	2008 (Region VII Tournament)
Lee (TN)	Southern States	50–8–1	Tournament champion	2011 NAIA World Series
Lewis-Clark State (ID)	NAIA West Group	41–12	World Series host	2011 NAIA World Series
LSU–Shreveport	Red River	48–4	Tournament champion	2011 NAIA World Series
Lubbock Christian (TX)	Sooner	33–20	Tournament runner-up	2011 NAIA World Series
Menlo (CA)	NAIA West Group	27–25	Tournament champion	First appearance
Missouri Baptist	American Midwest	37–14	Tournament champion	2011 (Cleveland Bracket)
Mount Marty (SD)	Great Plains	26–26	Tournament champion	2010 (Group 4 Bracket)
Mount Vernon Nazarene (OH)	Mid-Central	33–18	Tournament champion	2011 (Kingsport Bracket)
Oklahoma Baptist	Sooner	46–12	Tournament champion	2011 NAIA World Series
Peru State (NE)	Heart	35–16	Tournament champion	2002 (Region IV Tournament)
Siena Heights (MI)	Wolverine-Hoosier	31–21	Tournament champion	1994 NAIA World Series
St. Francis (IL)	Chicagoland	37–15	Tournament champion	2011 (Joliet Bracket)
St. Thomas (FL)	The Sun	43–12	Tournament champion	2011 (Riverside Bracket)
Sterling (KS)	Kansas	43–12	Tournament champion	2004 (Region IV Tournament)
Taylor (IN)	Mid-Central	37–18	Regular season champion	2010 (Group 3 Bracket)
Tennessee Wesleyan	Appalachian	45–11	Tournament champion	2011 NAIA World Series
Union (TN)	TranSouth	37–17	Tournament champion	2011 (Montgomery Bracket)
York (NE)	Midlands	39–17	Tournament champion	2010 (Group 4 Bracket)

=== At–Large ===
School	Conference	Record	Last NAIA Appearance
Auburn–Montgomery	Southern States	36–22	2011 (Montgomery Bracket)
Azusa Pacific (CA)	Golden State	44–10	2009 (Group 6 Bracket)
Bellevue (NE)	Midlands	39–19	2011 (Paducah Bracket)
Biola (CA)	Golden State	26–27	2011 (Joliet Bracket)
Campbellsville (KY)	Mid-South	36–16	2011 (Daytona Beach Bracket)
College of Idaho	NAIA West Group	38–18	2010 (Group 2 Bracket)
Freed–Hardeman (TN)	TranSouth	36–21	1997 (Mid South Regional)
Indiana Tech	Wolverine-Hoosier	39–20	2011 (Cleveland Bracket)
Lindsey Wilson (KY)	Mid-South	41–14	2007 (Region XI Tournament)
Oklahoma City	Sooner	43–9	2011 NAIA World Series
Point Park (PA)	NAIA East Group	48–9	2003 (Region IX Tournament)
Rogers State (OK)	Sooner	42–14	2011 (Lubbock Bracket)
Shorter (GA)	Southern States	37–17	2003 (Region XIII Tournament)
USC–Beaufort	The Sun	35–16	2010 (Group 3 Bracket)
Southern Poly (GA)	Southern States	35–23	2011 (Paducah Bracket)
Tabor (KS)	Kansas	41–13	1994 (District 10 Tournament)

== Opening Round ==
=== Azusa Bracket ===
Hosted by Azusa Pacific (CA) at Cougar Baseball Complex

First round
4	Arizona Christian	5
5	Menlo (CA)	8
First round
4	Arizona Christian	10
2	Shorter	8

Second round
1	Azusa Pacific (CA)	7
5	Menlo	11
2	Shorter (GA)	4
3	College of Idaho	6
Second round
1	Azusa Pacific	8
4	Arizona Christian	2

Semifinals
5	Menlo	0
3	College of Idaho	7
Semifinals
5	Menlo	3
1	Azusa Pacific	8

Finals
3	College of Idaho	2	7
1	Azusa Pacific	5	6

=== Cleveland Bracket ===
Hosted by Lee (TN) at Olympic Field

First round
4	Avila (MO)	1
5	Bacone (OK)	5
First round
4	Avila	5
2	Freed–Hardeman	4

Second round
1	Lee (TN)	12
5	Bacone	1
2	Freed–Hardeman (TN)	6
3	Missouri Baptist	9
Second round
5	Bacone	2
4	Avila	3

Semifinals
1	Lee	4
3	Missouri Baptist	5
Semifinals
1	Lee	13
4	Avila	0

Finals
3	Missouri Baptist	3	5
1	Lee	4	8

=== Daytona Beach Bracket ===
Hosted by Embry–Riddle (FL) at Sliwa Stadium

First round
4	Southern Poly (GA)	1
5	Siena Heights (MI)	3
First round
4	Southern Poly	9
3	Biola	8

Second round
1	Embry–Riddle (FL)	2
5	Siena Heights	0
2	Auburn–Montgomery	6
3	Biola (CA)	3
Second round
5	Siena Heights	8
4	Southern Poly	4

Semifinals
1	Embry–Riddle (FL)	2
2	Auburn–Montgomery	0
Semifinals
2	Auburn–Montgomery	9
5	Siena Heights	8

Finals
1	Embry–Riddle (FL)	10	–
2	Auburn–Montgomery	4	–

=== Hardeeville Bracket ===
Hosted by USC–Beaufort at Richard Gray Baseball Complex

First round
4	Union (TN)	7
5	Asbury (KY)	1
First round
5	Asbury	4
3	USC–Beaufort	9

Second round
1	Faulkner (AL)	1
4	Union (TN)	3
2	St. Thomas (FL)	6^{10}
3	USC–Beaufort	3
Second round
1	Faulkner	3
3	USC–Beaufort	7

Semifinals
4	Union (TN)	3
2	St. Thomas (FL)	6
Semifinals
4	Union (TN)	7
3	USC–Beaufort	8

Finals
2	St. Thomas (FL)	4	2
3	USC–Beaufort	5	11

=== Hutchinson Bracket ===
Hosted by the Tabor (KS) at Hobart-Detter Field

First round
4	Tabor (KS)	9
5	Dakota State (SD)	7
First round
5	Dakota State	4
2	Judson	9

Second round
1	Oklahoma Baptist	10
4	Tabor	6
2	Judson (IL)	5
3	Rogers State (OK)	9
Second round
4	Tabor	8
2	Judson	5

Semifinals
1	Oklahoma Baptist	4
3	Rogers State	5^{11}
Semifinals
1	Oklahoma Baptist	7
4	Tabor	8

Finals
3	Rogers State	7	–
4	Tabor	3	–

=== Kingsport Bracket ===
Hosted by the Appalachian Athletic Conference at Hunter Wright Stadium

First round
4	Campbellsville (KY)	3
5	St. Francis (IL)	6
First round
4	Campbellsville	7
2	Georgetown	4

Second round
1	Tennessee Wesleyan	3
5	St. Francis (IL)	0
2	Georgetown (KY)	2
3	Indiana Tech	4
Second round
5	St. Francis (IL)	6
4	Campbellsville	3

Semifinals
1	Tennessee Wesleyan	11
3	Indiana Tech	5
Semifinals
3	Indiana Tech	4
5	St. Francis (IL)	6

Finals
1	Tennessee Wesleyan	14	–
5	St. Francis (IL)	4	–

=== Marion Bracket ===
Hosted by the Mid-Central College Conference at IWU Wildcat Field

First round
4	Mount Vernon Nazarene (OH)	6
5	Doane (NE)	7^{11}
First round
4	Mount Vernon Nazarene	4
3	Taylor	6

Second round
1	Concordia (CA)	3
5	Doane	4
2	Point Park (PA)	3
3	Taylor (IN)	2
Second round
1	Concordia (CA)	4
3	Taylor	2

Semifinals
5	Doane	1
2	Point Park	9
Semifinals
5	Doane	6
1	Concordia (CA)	5

Finals
2	Point Park	7	–
5	Doane	5	–

=== Oklahoma City Bracket ===
Hosted by Oklahoma City at Jim Wade Stadium

First round
4	York (NE)	7
5	Mount Marty (SD)	8
First round
4	York	2
2	Lubbock Christian	6

Second round
1	Oklahoma City	12
5	Mount Marty	3
2	Lubbock Christian (TX)	8
3	Sterling (KS)	9
Second round
5	Mount Marty	1
2	Lubbock Christian	11

Semifinals
1	Oklahoma City	1
3	Sterling	2
Semifinals
1	Oklahoma City	4
2	Lubbock Christian	0

Finals
3	Sterling	0	0
1	Oklahoma City	7	3

=== Paducah Bracket ===
Hosted by the Paducah Convention & Visitors Bureau at J. Polk Brooks Stadium

First round
4	Peru State (NE)	5
5	Grand View (IA)	3
First round
5	Grand View	2
3	Bellevue	4

Second round
1	LSU–Shreveport	9
4	Peru State	3
2	Lindsey Wilson (KY)	6
3	Bellevue (NE)	5
Second round
4	Peru State	6
3	Bellevue	3

Semifinals
1	LSU–Shreveport	1
2	Lindsey Wilson	0
Semifinals
2	Lindsey Wilson	5
4	Peru State	0

Finals
1	LSU–Shreveport	5	–
2	Lindsey Wilson	1	–

== NAIA World Series ==
The NAIA World Series was held at Harris Field in Lewiston, Idaho.

=== Participants ===
School	Conference	Record	Head Coach	Bracket	Previous NAIA WS Appearances	Best NAIA WS Finish	NAIA WS Record
College of Idaho	NAIA West Group	41–19	Shawn Humberger	Azusa	4 (last: 2002)	1st (1998)	13–7
Embry–Riddle (FL)	The Sun	43–16	Randy Stegall	Daytona Beach	10 (last: 2011)	2nd (2005)	17–20
Lee (TN)	Southern States	54–9–1	Mark Brew	Cleveland	6 (last: 2011)	2nd (2008, 2010)	15–12
Lewis–Clark State (ID)	Frontier	41–12	Gary Picone	n/a	30 (last: 2011)	1st (1984, 1985, 1987, 1988, 1989, 1990, 1991, 1992, 1996, 1999, 2000, 2002, 2003, 2006, 2007, 2008)	119–37
LSU–Shreveport	Red River	51–4	Rocke Musgraves	Paducah	2 (last: 2011)	T-3rd (2003)	5–4
Oklahoma City	Sooner	47–10	Denney Crabaugh	Oklahoma City	13 (last: 2011)	1st (2005)	32–25
Point Park (PA)	NAIA East Group	51–9	Loren Torres	Marion	10 (last: 1998)	3rd (1979, 1986)	10–20
Rogers State (OK)	Sooner	45–14	Ron Bradley	Claremore	none	none	0–0
USC–Beaufort	The Sun	40–17	Bryan Lewallyn	Hardeeville	none	none	0–0
Tennessee Wesleyan	Appalachian	48–11	Billy Berry	Kingsport	2 (last: 2011)	T-9th (2010, 2011)	0–4

=== Bracket ===
==== Preliminary Bracket ====
First round Friday, May 25
8	USC–Beaufort	2
9	Rogers State	3
7	Point Park	7
10	College of Idaho	3
First round Saturday, May 26; Losers eliminated
8	USC–Beaufort	7
5	Embry–Riddle (FL)	2
10	College of Idaho	1
6	Lewis–Clark State	5

First round Friday, May 25; Second round Saturday, May 26
1	LSU–Shreveport	1
9	Rogers State	2
4	Tennessee Wesleyan	17
5	Embry–Riddle (FL)	3
2	Lee	9
7	Point Park	3
3	Oklahoma City	7
6	Lewis–Clark State	2
Second round Monday, May 28; Losers eliminated
7	Point Park	12
8	USC–Beaufort	8
1	LSU–Shreveport	7
6	Lewis–Clark State	3

Third round Monday, May 28; Winners to Championship Bracket
9	Rogers State	6
4	Tennessee Wesleyan	8
2	Lee	7
3	Oklahoma City	3
Third round Tuesday, May 29; Winners to Championship Bracket
9	Rogers State	8
7	Point Park	6
3	Oklahoma City	4
1	LSU–Shreveport	5

Fourth Round; Tuesday, May 29
4	Tennessee Wesleyan	13
2	Lee	3

==== Championship Bracket ====
First Round; Wednesday, May 30
4	Tennessee Wesleyan	3
1	LSU–Shreveport	7
2	Lee	5
9	Rogers State	7

Semifinal; Thursday, May 31
1	LSU–Shreveport	10
4	Tennessee Wesleyan	17

Final; Friday, June 1
4	Tennessee Wesleyan	10
9	Rogers State	6

=== Game Results ===
All game times are listed in Pacific Daylight Time (UTC−07:00).

==== Preliminary Bracket ====
Friday, May 25; 9:00 am Game 1	(10) College of Idaho	3–7	(7) Point Park	Harris Field; Attendance: 870; Umpires: HP: Tracy Roles, 1B: Steve Miller, 2B: Craig Mirr, 3B: Rich Stonum
Friday, May 25; 9:00 am Game 1	LP: Taylor Nicholson (9–3)	Boxscore	WP: Sean Clark (8–0)	Harris Field; Attendance: 870; Umpires: HP: Tracy Roles, 1B: Steve Miller, 2B: Craig Mirr, 3B: Rich Stonum

Friday, May 25; 12:00 pm Game 2	(9) Rogers State	3–2	(8) USC–Beaufort	Harris Field; Attendance: 2110
Friday, May 25; 12:00 pm Game 2	WP: Shawn Spainhoward (10–2)	Boxscore	LP: Michael Heesch (9–3)	Harris Field; Attendance: 2110

Friday, May 25; 3:00 pm Game 3	(4) Tennessee Wesleyan	17–3	(5) Embry–Riddle (FL)	Harris Field; Attendance: 775
Friday, May 25; 3:00 pm Game 3	WP: Jeremy Fitzgerald (11–0)	Boxscore	LP: Adam Paulencu (8–3)	Harris Field; Attendance: 775
Friday, May 25; 3:00 pm Game 3	HR: Stephen Branca (17), Jake Stone (12), Taylor Oldham (19), Drew Levi (11), Dale Ricketts (9)	Boxscore		Harris Field; Attendance: 775

Friday, May 25; 7:00 pm Game 4	(3) Oklahoma City	7–2	(6) Lewis–Clark State	Harris Field; Attendance: 3115
Friday, May 25; 7:00 pm Game 4	WP: Rich Hawkins (12–2); Sv: Ryan Gibson (1)	Boxscore	LP: Michael Noteware (9–3)	Harris Field; Attendance: 3115
Friday, May 25; 7:00 pm Game 4	HR: Chad Carman (11), Miguel Beltran (26), Jonathan Sigado (4)	Boxscore		Harris Field; Attendance: 3115

Saturday, May 26; 9:00 am Game 5	(8) USC–Beaufort	7–2	(5) Embry–Riddle (FL)	Harris Field; Attendance: 475
Saturday, May 26; 9:00 am Game 5	WP: Adam Miller (10–5)	Boxscore	LP: Daniel Eaton (7–6)	Harris Field; Attendance: 475

Saturday, May 26; 12:00 pm Game 6	(6) Lewis–Clark State	5–1	(10) College of Idaho	Harris Field; Attendance: 2530; Umpires: HP: Craig Mirr, 1B: Tracy Roles, 2B: Leland Hollis, 3B: Steve Miller
Saturday, May 26; 12:00 pm Game 6	WP: Anthony Armanino (10–1)	Boxscore	LP: Todd Griffiths (4–2)	Harris Field; Attendance: 2530; Umpires: HP: Craig Mirr, 1B: Tracy Roles, 2B: Leland Hollis, 3B: Steve Miller
Saturday, May 26; 12:00 pm Game 6	HR: Braxton Miller (10)	Boxscore		Harris Field; Attendance: 2530; Umpires: HP: Craig Mirr, 1B: Tracy Roles, 2B: Leland Hollis, 3B: Steve Miller

Saturday, May 26; 3:00 pm Game 7	(7) Point Park	3–9	(2) Lee	Harris Field; Attendance: 990
Saturday, May 26; 3:00 pm Game 7	LP: Nathan Spohn (8–1)	Boxscore	WP: Kris Hall (12–0)	Harris Field; Attendance: 990

Saturday, May 26; 6:30 pm Game 8	(1) LSU–Shreveport	1–2	(9) Rogers State	Harris Field; Attendance: 2075
Saturday, May 26; 6:30 pm Game 8	LP: Jared Mortensen (11–2)	Boxscore	WP: Brandon Bargas (7–3)	Harris Field; Attendance: 2075
Saturday, May 26; 6:30 pm Game 8	HR: Brandon Cooksey (1)	Boxscore		Harris Field; Attendance: 2075

Monday, May 28; 9:00 am Game 9	(8) USC–Beaufort	8–12	(7) Point Park	Harris Field; Attendance: 1275
Monday, May 28; 9:00 am Game 9	LP: Gavin Miles (6–1)	Boxscore	WP: Derek Peluso (10–1); Sv: Mike Tullio (15)	Harris Field; Attendance: 1275

Monday, May 28; 12:00 pm Game 10	(6) Lewis–Clark State	7–3	(1) LSU–Shreveport	Harris Field
Monday, May 28; 12:00 pm Game 10	LP: Mitchell Wilhite (2–2)	Boxscore	WP: Jake Kight (4–0)	Harris Field
Monday, May 28; 12:00 pm Game 10		Boxscore	HR: Kyle Pearson (14), Devin Greco (7)	Harris Field

Monday, May 28; 3:00 pm Game 11	(9) Rogers State	6–8	(4) Tennessee Wesleyan	Harris Field; Attendance: 1405
Monday, May 28; 3:00 pm Game 11	LP: Kyle Duncan (8–2)	Boxscore	WP: Josh Culler (10–2); Sv: Alfonso Yevoli (6)	Harris Field; Attendance: 1405
Monday, May 28; 3:00 pm Game 11	HR: Randy Ramirez (3)	Boxscore	HR: Jordan Guida (6)	Harris Field; Attendance: 1405

Monday, May 28; 6:30 pm Game 12	(2) Lee	7–3	(3) Oklahoma City	Harris Field; Attendance: 1220
Monday, May 28; 6:30 pm Game 12	WP: Patrick Merkling (9–2)	Boxscore	LP: Blake Schwartz (11–4)	Harris Field; Attendance: 1220

Tuesday, May 29; 12:00 pm Game 13	(7) Point Park	6–8	(9) Rogers State	Harris Field; Attendance: 890; Umpires: HP: Steve Miller, 1B: Larry Randall, 2B: Tim Farwig, 3B: Craig Mirr
Tuesday, May 29; 12:00 pm Game 13	LP: Mike Tullio (6–5)	Boxscore	WP: Shawn Spainhoward (11–2)	Harris Field; Attendance: 890; Umpires: HP: Steve Miller, 1B: Larry Randall, 2B: Tim Farwig, 3B: Craig Mirr
Tuesday, May 29; 12:00 pm Game 13	HR: Marlon Leyva (2)	Boxscore		Harris Field; Attendance: 890; Umpires: HP: Steve Miller, 1B: Larry Randall, 2B: Tim Farwig, 3B: Craig Mirr

Tuesday, May 29; 3:00 pm Game 14	(1) LSU–Shreveport	5–4	(3) Oklahoma City	Harris Field; Attendance: 1095; Umpires: HP: Dwayne Finley, 1B: Craig Mirr, 2B: Larry Randall, 3B: Leland Hollis
Tuesday, May 29; 3:00 pm Game 14	WP: Logan Norris (9–1); Sv: Jake Kight (4)	Boxscore	LP: Patrick Goelz (2–2)	Harris Field; Attendance: 1095; Umpires: HP: Dwayne Finley, 1B: Craig Mirr, 2B: Larry Randall, 3B: Leland Hollis
Tuesday, May 29; 3:00 pm Game 14	HR: Greg Friesen 2 (14)	Boxscore	HR: Miguel Beltran (27)	Harris Field; Attendance: 1095; Umpires: HP: Dwayne Finley, 1B: Craig Mirr, 2B: Larry Randall, 3B: Leland Hollis

Tuesday, May 29; 6:30 pm Game 15	(4) Tennessee Wesleyan	13–3	(2) Lee	Harris Field; Attendance: 1480; Umpires: HP: Rich Stonum, 1B: Tracy Roles, 2B: Leland Hollis, 3B: Tim Farwig
Tuesday, May 29; 6:30 pm Game 15	WP: Corey Rhoney (10–0)	Boxscore	LP: Vince Spilker (7–2)	Harris Field; Attendance: 1480; Umpires: HP: Rich Stonum, 1B: Tracy Roles, 2B: Leland Hollis, 3B: Tim Farwig
Tuesday, May 29; 6:30 pm Game 15	HR: Stephen Branca (18), Jordan Guida (7)	Boxscore		Harris Field; Attendance: 1480; Umpires: HP: Rich Stonum, 1B: Tracy Roles, 2B: Leland Hollis, 3B: Tim Farwig

==== Championship Bracket ====
Wednesday, May 30; 3:30 pm Game 16	(2) Lee	5–7	(9) Rogers State	Harris Field; Attendance: 1360; Umpires: HP: Tim Farwig, 1B: Steve Miller, 2B: Craig Mirr, 3B: Larry Randall, LF: Rich Stonum, RF: Leland Hollis
Wednesday, May 30; 3:30 pm Game 16	LP: Matt Passauer (2–1)	Boxscore	WP: Casey Cassity (4–1)	Harris Field; Attendance: 1360; Umpires: HP: Tim Farwig, 1B: Steve Miller, 2B: Craig Mirr, 3B: Larry Randall, LF: Rich Stonum, RF: Leland Hollis
Wednesday, May 30; 3:30 pm Game 16	HR: Corey Davis (11), Trevor Burgess (2)	Boxscore		Harris Field; Attendance: 1360; Umpires: HP: Tim Farwig, 1B: Steve Miller, 2B: Craig Mirr, 3B: Larry Randall, LF: Rich Stonum, RF: Leland Hollis

Wednesday, May 30; 6:30 pm Game 17	(1) LSU–Shreveport	7–3	(4) Tennessee Wesleyan	Harris Field; Attendance: 2290; Umpires: HP: Larry Randall, 1B: Craig Mirr, 2B; Steve Miller, 3B: Tim Farwig, LF: Leland Hollis, RF: Rich Stonum
Wednesday, May 30; 6:30 pm Game 17	WP: Jared Mortensen (12–2)	Boxscore	LP: Jeremy Fitzgerald (11–1)	Harris Field; Attendance: 2290; Umpires: HP: Larry Randall, 1B: Craig Mirr, 2B; Steve Miller, 3B: Tim Farwig, LF: Leland Hollis, RF: Rich Stonum
Wednesday, May 30; 6:30 pm Game 17		Boxscore	HR: Jordan Guida (8)	Harris Field; Attendance: 2290; Umpires: HP: Larry Randall, 1B: Craig Mirr, 2B; Steve Miller, 3B: Tim Farwig, LF: Leland Hollis, RF: Rich Stonum

Thursday, May 31; 6:30 pm Game 18	(4) Tennessee Wesleyan	17–10	(1) LSU–Shreveport	Harris Field; Attendance: 1870; Umpires: HP: Craig Mirr, 1B: Leland Hollis, 2B; Tim Farwig, 3B: Rich Stonum, LF: Steve Miller, RF: Larry Randall
Thursday, May 31; 6:30 pm Game 18	WP: Zach Fleshman (7–1)	Boxscore	LP: Cam Ellis (2–2)	Harris Field; Attendance: 1870; Umpires: HP: Craig Mirr, 1B: Leland Hollis, 2B; Tim Farwig, 3B: Rich Stonum, LF: Steve Miller, RF: Larry Randall
Thursday, May 31; 6:30 pm Game 18	HR: Jake Stone (13), Taylor Oldham (20), Jordan Guida 3 (11)	Boxscore	HR: Greg Friesen (15)	Harris Field; Attendance: 1870; Umpires: HP: Craig Mirr, 1B: Leland Hollis, 2B; Tim Farwig, 3B: Rich Stonum, LF: Steve Miller, RF: Larry Randall

==== Championship Game ====
Friday, June 1 6:30 pm PDT at Harris Field Game 19
Team	1	2	3	4	5	6	7	8	9	R	H	E
Rogers State	3	0	3	0	0	0	0	0	0	6	8	3
Tennessee Wesleyan	2	0	0	0	0	3	0	5	X	10	10	1
WP: Corey Collins (4–1) LP: Brandon Bargas (7–4); Home runs: RSU: None; TWC: Taylor Oldham (21), Jordan Guida (12), Drew Levi (12); Attendance: 3075; Umpires: HP: Leland Hollis, 1B: Tim Farwig, 2B: Rich Stonum, 3B: Steve Miller, LF: Larry Randall, RF: Craig Mirr; Boxscore

== See also ==
- 2012 NAIA softball tournament
- 2012 NCAA Division I baseball tournament
- 2012 NCAA Division II baseball tournament
- 2012 NCAA Division III baseball tournament
