= 2011 NAIA baseball tournament =

- Teams: 46
- Finals site: Harris Field; Lewiston, Idaho
- Champions: Concordia (CA) (1st title)
- Winning coach: Mike Grahovac
- MVP: Matt Ivanoff (Concordia (CA))

The 2011 NAIA baseball tournament was the 55th edition of the NAIA baseball championship. The 46-team tournament began on May 12 with Opening Round games across nine different sites and concluded with the 2011 NAIA World Series in Lewiston, Idaho that began on May 27 and ended on June 3. Concordia (CA) defeated Lubbock Christian (TX) 9–3 in the championship game for their 1st title in program history.

The 46 participating teams were selected from all eligible NAIA teams with the World Series host receiving an automatic bid to the NAIA World Series. The remaining 45 teams participated in the Opening Round with 32 teams being awarded automatic bids as either champions and/or runners-up of their conferences, and 13 teams were selected at-large, which were determined by the final NAIA Baseball Coaches' Top 25 Poll. Teams were then placed into one of nine pre-determined Opening Round sites of five teams a piece, each of which is conducted via a double-elimination tournament. The winners of each of the Opening Round sites plus the World Series host team participated in the NAIA World Series.

This would be the first time that the NAIA started using the host city to identify Opening Round sites instead of using group numbers.

== Tournament procedure ==
A total of 46 teams entered the tournament. As World Series host, Lewis–Clark State received an automatic bid into the NAIA World Series. 32 automatic bids were determined by either winning their conference's regular season championship, conference tournament, and/or conference tournament runner-up. The other 13 bids were at-large, with selections determined by the final NAIA Baseball Coaches' Top 25 Poll.

== Opening round hosts ==
On May 8, the NAIA announced the nine opening round host sites, which were played from May 12–16.

Opening Round hosts

Venue(s)	Location(s)	Host(s)
Hunter Wright Stadium	Kingsport, TN	Appalachian Athletic Conference; Kingsport Convention & Visitors Bureau
AUM Baseball Complex	Montgomery, AL	Auburn University at Montgomery
James W. Totman Stadium	Riverside, CA	California Baptist University
Silver Cross Field	Joliet, IL	Chicagoland Collegiate Athletic Conference; University of St. Francis
Sliwa Stadium	Daytona Beach, FL	Embry–Riddle Aeronautical University (FL)
Olympic Field	Cleveland, TN	Lee University
Hays Field	Lubbock, TX	Lubbock Christian University
Jim Wade Stadium	Oklahoma City, OK	Oklahoma City University
J. Polk Brooks Stadium	Paducah, KY	Paducah Convention & Visitors Bureau

== Bids ==
=== Automatic ===
School	Conference	Record	Berth	Last NAIA Appearance
Belhaven (MS)	Southern States	43–16	Tournament champion	2010 (Group 9 Bracket)
Bellevue (NE)	Midlands	31–20	Tournament champion	2009 (Group 9 Bracket)
British Columbia	NAIA West Group	30–15	Tournament champion	2010 (Group 6 Bracket)
Cal State–San Marcos	A.I.I.	32–17	Tournament champion	First appearance
California Baptist	Golden State	40–13	Regular season champion	2010 NAIA World Series
Campbellsville (KY)	Mid-South	32–19	Regular season champion	2010 (Group 1 Bracket)
Concordia (CA)	Golden State	34–17	Tournament champion	2008 (Region II Tournament)
Culver–Stockton (MO)	Heart	36–15	Regular season champion	2008 (Region V Tournament)
Doane (NE)	Great Plains	36–17	Tournament champion	2002 (Region IV Tournament)
Edward Waters (FL)	NAIA East Group	37–24	Tournament champion	2005 (Region XIV Tournament)
Embry–Riddle (FL)	The Sun	47–8	Regular season champion	2010 NAIA World Series
Hastings (NE)	Great Plains	28–22	Regular season champion	2001 (Region IV Tournament)
Huntington (IN)	Mid-Central	21–23	Tournament champion	2010 (Group 2 Bracket)
Indiana Tech	Wolverine-Hoosier	34–18	Tournament champion	2010 (Group 8 Bracket)
IU Southeast	Kentucky	37–13	Tournament champion	2010 (Group 8 Bracket)
Iowa Wesleyan	Midwest	33–18	Tournament champion	2008 (Region VII Tournament)
Jamestown (ND)	Dakota	31–11	Tournament champion	2010 (Group 5 Bracket)
Kansas Wesleyan	Kansas	34–15	Tournament champion	2010 (Group 9 Bracket)
Lewis-Clark State (ID)	NAIA West Group	37–15	World Series host	2010 NAIA World Series
LSU–Shreveport	Red River	42–13	Tournament champion	2010 (Group 8 Bracket)
Mount Vernon Nazarene (OH)	American Mideast	30–17	Tournament champion	2010 (Group 3 Bracket)
Oklahoma Baptist	Sooner	42–12	Tournament runner-up	2008 (Region VI Tournament)
Robert Morris (IL)	Chicagoland	37–17	Regular season champion	2010 (Group 1 Bracket)
Rogers State (OK)	Sooner	45–13	Tournament champion	First appearance
Shawnee State (OH)	Mid-South	35–24	Tournament champion	2003 (Region IX Tournament)
St. Francis (IL)	Chicagoland	39–12	Tournament champion	2010 (Group 1 Bracket)
St. Thomas (FL)	The Sun	25–30	Tournament runner-up	2010 (Group 7 Bracket)
Tennessee Wesleyan	Appalachian	37–18	Tournament champion	2010 NAIA World Series
Texas–Brownsville	Red River	35–24	Tournament runner-up	2010 (Group 4 Bracket)
Union (TN)	TranSouth	38–15	Tournament champion	2010 (Group 5 Bracket)
William Carey (MS)	Southern States	30–25	Tournament runner-up	2009 (Group 7 Bracket)
William Jewell (MO)	Heart	33–16	Tournament champion	2010 (Group 3 Bracket)
William Woods (MO)	American Midwest	32–16	Tournament champion	2007 (Region V Tournament)

=== At–Large ===
School	Conference	Record	Last NAIA Appearance
Auburn–Montgomery (AL)	Southern States	40–17	2009 (Group 4 Bracket)
Brewton–Parker (GA)	Southern States	35–16	2010 (Group 9 Bracket)
Biola (CA)	Golden State	35–19	2009 (Group 6 Bracket)
Cumberland (TN)	TranSouth	43–14	2010 NAIA World Series
Faulkner (AL)	Southern States	43–12	2010 (Group 7 Bracket)
Fresno Pacific (CA)	Golden State	29–18	2010 (Group 6 Bracket)
Lee (TN)	Southern States	37–17	2010 NAIA World Series
Lubbock Christian (TX)	Sooner	43–12	2010 NAIA World Series
Missouri Baptist	American Midwest	38–11	2010 (Group 9 Bracket)
Northwood (TX)	Red River	38–16	2009 (Group 1 Bracket)
Oklahoma City	Sooner	43–10	2010 NAIA World Series
Southern Poly (GA)	Southern States	38–15	2010 (Group 8 Bracket)
Union (KY)	Appalachian	45–10	2010 (Group 7 Bracket)

== Opening Round ==
=== Cleveland Bracket ===
Hosted by Lee University at Olympic Field

First round
4	Indiana Tech	5
5	Shawnee State (OH)	6^{10}
First round
4	Indiana Tech	10
2	Missouri Baptist	8

Second round
1	Lee (TN)	10
5	Shawnee State (OH)	1
2	Missouri Baptist	3
3	Culver–Stockton (MO)	8
Second round
5	Shawnee State (OH)	1
4	Indiana Tech	8

Semifinals
1	Lee (TN)	9
3	Culver–Stockton (MO)	1
Semifinals
3	Culver–Stockton (MO)	7
4	Indiana Tech	10

Finals
1	Lee (TN)	13	–
4	Indiana Tech	2	–

=== Daytona Beach Bracket ===
Hosted by Embry–Riddle Aeronautical University (FL) at Sliwa Stadium

First round
4	William Carey (MS)	7
5	Edward Waters (FL)	10
First round
4	William Carey (MS)	10
3	Campbellsville (KY)	6

Second round
1	Embry–Riddle (FL)	16
5	Edward Waters (FL)	0
2	Brewton–Parker (GA)	18
3	Campbellsville (KY)	6
Second round
5	Edward Waters (FL)	7
4	William Carey (MS)	4

Semifinals
1	Embry–Riddle (FL)	7
2	Brewton–Parker (GA)	4
Semifinals
2	Brewton–Parker (GA)	11
5	Edward Waters (FL)	2

Finals
1	Embry–Riddle (FL)	8	–
2	Brewton–Parker (GA)	2	–

=== Joliet Bracket ===
Hosted by Chicagoland Collegiate Athletic Conference and the University of St. Francis at Silver Cross Field

First round
4	Robert Morris (IL)	5
5	Jamestown (ND)	13
First round
4	Robert Morris (IL)	1
3	St. Francis (IL)	3

Second round
1	Oklahoma Baptist	6
5	Jamestown (ND)	2
2	Biola (CA)	6
3	St. Francis (IL)	2
Second round
5	Jamestown (ND)	1
3	St. Francis (IL)	3

Semifinals
1	Oklahoma Baptist	6
2	Biola (CA)	5
Semifinals
2	Biola (CA)	12
3	St. Francis (IL)	1

Finals
1	Oklahoma Baptist	13	–
2	Biola (CA)	1	–

=== Kingsport Bracket ===
Hosted by Kingsport CVB and Appalachian Athletic Conference at Hunter Wright Stadium

First round
4	Iowa Wesleyan	7
5	Mount Vernon Nazarene (OH)	5
First round
5	Mount Vernon Nazarene (OH)	2
3	IU Southeast	4

Second round
1	Union (KY)	9
4	Iowa Wesleyan	4
2	Faulkner (AL)	8
3	IU Southeast	1
Second round
4	Iowa Wesleyan	4
3	IU Southeast	2

Semifinals
1	Union (KY)	1
2	Faulkner (AL)	10
Semifinals
1	Union (KY)	9
4	Iowa Wesleyan	6

Finals
2	Faulkner (AL)	5	4
1	Union (KY)	7	2

=== Lubbock Bracket ===
Hosted by Lubbock Christian University at Hays Field

First round
4	Kansas Wesleyan	11^{7}
5	Hastings (NE)	1
First round
5	Hastings (NE)	10
2	Rogers State (OK)	7

Second round
1	Lubbock Christian (TX)	13
4	Kansas Wesleyan	2
2	Rogers State (OK)	5
3	Northwood (TX)	8
Second round
4	Kansas Wesleyan	7
5	Hastings (NE)	1

Semifinals
1	Lubbock Christian (TX)	3
3	Northwood (TX)	0
Semifinals
3	Northwood (TX)	5
4	Kansas Wesleyan	6

Finals
1	Lubbock Christian (TX)	10	–
4	Kansas Wesleyan	3	–

=== Montgomery Bracket ===
Hosted by the Auburn University at Montgomery at AUM Baseball Complex

First round
4	William Woods (MO)	7
5	Huntington (IN)	1
First round
5	Huntington (IN)	2
3	Union (TN)	1

Second round
1	LSU–Shreveport	10
4	William Woods (MO)	5
2	Auburn–Montgomery (AL)	11
3	Union (TN)	5
Second round
4	William Woods (MO)	15
5	Huntington (IN)	8

Semifinals
1	LSU–Shreveport	7
2	Auburn–Montgomery (AL)	5
Semifinals
2	Auburn–Montgomery (AL)	9
4	William Woods (MO)	8

Finals
1	LSU–Shreveport	32	–
2	Auburn–Montgomery (AL)	7	–

=== Oklahoma City Bracket ===
Hosted by Oklahoma City University at Jim Wade Stadium

First round
4	Texas–Brownsville	2
5	Doane (NE)	9
First round
4	Texas–Brownsville	1
2	Fresno Pacific (CA)	10

Second round
1	Oklahoma City	10
5	Doane (NE)	5
2	Fresno Pacific (CA)	9
3	Belhaven (MS)	10^{10}
Second round
5	Doane (NE)	2
2	Fresno Pacific (CA)	9

Semifinals
1	Oklahoma City	10^{10}
3	Belhaven (MS)	9
Semifinals
3	Belhaven (MS)	7^{12}
2	Fresno Pacific (CA)	6

Finals
1	Oklahoma City	15	–
3	Belhaven (MS)	0	–

=== Paducah Bracket ===
Hosted by the Paducah Convention & Visitors Bureau at J. Polk Brooks Stadium

First round
4	Bellevue (NE)	1
5	William Jewell (MO)	15
First round
4	Bellevue (NE)	1
2	Southern Poly (GA)	5

Second round
1	Cumberland (TN)	11
5	William Jewell (MO)	1
2	Southern Poly (GA)	7
3	Tennessee Wesleyan	8
Second round
5	William Jewell (MO)	6
2	Southern Poly (GA)	3

Semifinals
1	Cumberland (TN)	3
3	Tennessee Wesleyan	5
Semifinals
1	Cumberland (TN)	14
5	William Jewell (MO)	7

Finals
3	Tennessee Wesleyan	10	9
1	Cumberland (TN)	19	2

=== Riverside Bracket ===
Hosted by the California Baptist University at James W. Totman Stadium

First round
4	Cal State–San Marcos	3
5	St. Thomas (FL)	1
First round
5	St. Thomas (FL)	3
2	British Columbia	5

Second round
1	California Baptist	8
4	Cal State–San Marcos	7
2	British Columbia	5
3	Concordia (CA)	6
Second round
4	Cal State–San Marcos	7
2	British Columbia	5

Semifinals
1	California Baptist	3
3	Concordia (CA)	4
Semifinals
1	California Baptist	4
4	Cal State–San Marcos	2

Finals
3	Concordia (CA)	4	–
1	California Baptist	2	–

== NAIA World Series ==
The NAIA World Series was held at Harris Field in Lewiston, Idaho.

=== Participants ===
School	Conference	Record	Head Coach	Bracket	Previous NAIA WS Appearances	Best NAIA WS Finish	NAIA WS Record
Concordia (CA)	Golden State	38–18	Mike Grahovac	Riverside	1 (last: 2006)	7th (2006)	1–2
Embry–Riddle (FL)	The Sun	50–9	Randy Stegall	Daytona Beach	9 (last: 2010)	2nd (2005)	16–18
Faulkner (AL)	Southern States	48–13	Patrick McCarthy	Kingsport	none	none	0–0
Lee (TN)	Southern States	47–12	Mark Brew	Cleveland	5 (last: 2010)	2nd (2008, 2010)	11–10
Lewis–Clark State (ID)	NAIA West Group (Frontier)	37–15	Gary Picone	n/a	29 (last: 2010)	1st (1984, 1985, 1987, 1988, 1989, 1990, 1991, 1992, 1996, 1999, 2000, 2002, 2003, 2006, 2007, 2008)	118–35
LSU–Shreveport	Red River	45–13	Rocke Musgraves	Montgomery	1 (last: 2003)	T-3rd (2003)	3–2
Lubbock Christian (TX)	Sooner	46–12	Nathan Blackwood	Lubbock	9 (last: 2010)	1st (1983, 2009)	19–16
Oklahoma Baptist	Sooner	45–12	Bobby Cox	Joliet	2 (last: 1996)	4th (1989)	2–4
Oklahoma City	Sooner	46–10	Denney Crabaugh	Oklahoma City	12 (last: 2010)	1st (2005)	31–23
Tennessee Wesleyan	Appalachian	40–19	Billy Berry	Paducah	1 (last: 2010)	T-9th (2010)	0–2

=== Bracket ===
==== Preliminary Bracket ====
First round Friday, May 27
8	Faulkner (AL)	2
9	Concordia (CA)	7
7	Lewis–Clark State (ID)	5
10	Tennessee Wesleyan	4
First round Saturday, May 28; Losers eliminated
8	Faulkner (AL)	3
5	Lee (TN)	7
10	Tennessee Wesleyan	6
6	Oklahoma Baptist	8

First round Friday, May 27; Second round Saturday, May 28
1	Embry–Riddle (FL)	9
9	Concordia (CA)	3
4	LSU–Shreveport	5
5	Lee (TN)	4
2	Oklahoma City	2
7	Lewis–Clark State (ID)	1
3	Oklahoma Baptist	2
6	Lubbock Christian (TX)	7
Second round Monday, May 30; Losers eliminated
7	Lewis–Clark State (ID)	3
5	Lee (TN)	7
9	Concordia (CA)	7
3	Oklahoma Baptist	5

Third round Monday, May 30; Winners to Championship Bracket
1	Embry–Riddle (FL)	2
4	LSU–Shreveport	3^{10}
2	Oklahoma City	1
6	Lubbock Christian (TX)	8
Third round Tuesday, May 31; Winners to Championship Bracket
1	Embry–Riddle (FL)	4
5	Lee (TN)	7
2	Oklahoma City	4
9	Concordia (CA)	7

Fourth Round; Tuesday, May 31
4	LSU–Shreveport	0
6	Lubbock Christian (TX)	3

==== Championship Bracket ====
First Round; Wednesday, June 1
5	Lee (TN)	1
6	Lubbock Christian (TX)	0
4	LSU–Shreveport	4
9	Concordia (CA)	8

Semifinal; Friday, June 3
5	Lee (TN)	2
6	Lubbock Christian (TX)	10

Final; Friday, June 3
6	Lubbock Christian (TX)	3
9	Concordia (CA)	9

=== Game Results ===
All game times are listed in Pacific Daylight Time (UTC−07:00).

==== Preliminary Bracket ====
Friday, May 27; 8:30 am Game 1	(9) Concordia (CA)	7–2	(8) Faulkner (AL)	Harris Field; Attendance: 1290; Umpires: HP: Tim Farwig, 1B: Brian Soulliere, 2B: Steve Miller, 3B: Reggie Jackson
Friday, May 27; 8:30 am Game 1	WP: Dean Persinger (7–4); Sv: Josh White (1)	Boxscore	LP: R.L. Eisenbach (14–2)	Harris Field; Attendance: 1290; Umpires: HP: Tim Farwig, 1B: Brian Soulliere, 2B: Steve Miller, 3B: Reggie Jackson
Friday, May 27; 8:30 am Game 1	HR: Ryan Sheeks (3)	Boxscore		Harris Field; Attendance: 1290; Umpires: HP: Tim Farwig, 1B: Brian Soulliere, 2B: Steve Miller, 3B: Reggie Jackson

Friday, May 27; 12:00 pm Game 2	(5) Lee (TN)	4–5	(4) LSU–Shreveport	Harris Field; Attendance: 1760
Friday, May 27; 12:00 pm Game 2	LP: Maxx Catapano (8–4)	Boxscore	WP: Cade Bowen (2–0)	Harris Field; Attendance: 1760
Friday, May 27; 12:00 pm Game 2	HR: Michael Brown (8)	Boxscore	HR: Curtis Beaudoin (6)	Harris Field; Attendance: 1760

Friday, May 27; 3:00 pm Game 3	(6) Lubbock Christian (TX)	7–2	(3) Oklahoma Baptist	Harris Field
Friday, May 27; 3:00 pm Game 3	WP: Lucas Whitmore (10–2)	Boxscore	LP: Richie Mirowski (11–2)	Harris Field
Friday, May 27; 3:00 pm Game 3		Boxscore	HR: Michael Sliger (9)	Harris Field

Friday, May 27; 7:30 pm Game 4	(7) Lewis–Clark State (ID)	5–4	(10) Tennessee Wesleyan	Harris Field; Attendance: 2990
Friday, May 27; 7:30 pm Game 4	WP: Tyrell Poggemeyer (8–2); Sv: Austin Pentacost (2)	Boxscore	LP: Josh McDaniel (7–3)	Harris Field; Attendance: 2990

Saturday, May 28; 8:30 am Game 5	(8) Faulkner (AL)	3–7	(5) Lee (TN)	Harris Field
Saturday, May 28; 8:30 am Game 5	LP: Jacob Simmons (10–3)	Boxscore	WP: Curtis Camilli (8–2)	Harris Field
Saturday, May 28; 8:30 am Game 5	HR: Michael Clayton (16)	Boxscore	HR: Roberto Reyes (12)	Harris Field

Saturday, May 28; 12:00 pm Game 6	(10) Tennessee Wesleyan	6–8	(3) Oklahoma Baptist	Harris Field
Saturday, May 28; 12:00 pm Game 6	LP: Noah Piard (7–3)	Boxscore	WP: Kyle Brule (7–1)	Harris Field
Saturday, May 28; 12:00 pm Game 6		Boxscore	HR: Daniel Baptista (14)	Harris Field

Saturday, May 28; 3:30 pm Game 7	(9) Concordia (CA)	3–9	(1) Embry–Riddle (FL)	Harris Field; Attendance: 1810; Umpires: HP: Reggie Jackson, 1B: Tim Farwig, 2B: Leland Hollis, 3B: Craig Mirr
Saturday, May 28; 3:30 pm Game 7	LP: Sam Lindsey (2–2)	Boxscore	WP: Tucker Jensen (14–1)	Harris Field; Attendance: 1810; Umpires: HP: Reggie Jackson, 1B: Tim Farwig, 2B: Leland Hollis, 3B: Craig Mirr
Saturday, May 28; 3:30 pm Game 7	HR: Ryan Skeeks (4)	Boxscore	HR: Keaton Stroud (2)	Harris Field; Attendance: 1810; Umpires: HP: Reggie Jackson, 1B: Tim Farwig, 2B: Leland Hollis, 3B: Craig Mirr

Saturday, May 28; 7:00 pm Game 8	(2) Oklahoma City	2–1	(7) Lewis–Clark State (ID)	Harris Field; Attendance: 3305; Umpires: HP: Leland Hollis, 1B: Craig Mirr, 2B: Reggie Jackson, 3B: Tim Farwig
Saturday, May 28; 7:00 pm Game 8	WP: Corey Theriot (11–1); Sv: Dearth Parker (2)	Boxscore	LP: Tyler Barrett (7–3)	Harris Field; Attendance: 3305; Umpires: HP: Leland Hollis, 1B: Craig Mirr, 2B: Reggie Jackson, 3B: Tim Farwig

Monday, May 30; 8:30 am Game 9	(3) Oklahoma Baptist	5–7	(9) Concordia (CA)	Harris Field; Attendance: 870; Umpires: HP: Rich Stonum, 1B: Reggie Jackson, 2B: Larry Randall, 3B: Brian Soulliere
Monday, May 30; 8:30 am Game 9	LP: Ryan Plum (8–2)	Boxscore	WP: Brent Clapper (9–4); Sv: Ryan Day (8)	Harris Field; Attendance: 870; Umpires: HP: Rich Stonum, 1B: Reggie Jackson, 2B: Larry Randall, 3B: Brian Soulliere
Monday, May 30; 8:30 am Game 9	HR: Alan Trayler (15)	Boxscore		Harris Field; Attendance: 870; Umpires: HP: Rich Stonum, 1B: Reggie Jackson, 2B: Larry Randall, 3B: Brian Soulliere

Monday, May 30; 12:00 pm Game 10	(7) Lewis–Clark State (ID)	3–7	(5) Lee (TN)	Harris Field
Monday, May 30; 12:00 pm Game 10	LP: Cody Fassold (4–4)	Boxscore	WP: Maxx Catapano (9–4)	Harris Field

Monday, May 30; 3:00 pm Game 11	(1) Embry–Riddle (FL)	2–3 (F/10)	(4) LSU–Shreveport	Harris Field; Attendance: 1225; Umpires: HP: Tim Farwig, 1B: Leland Hollis, 2B: Steve Miller, 3B: Craig Mirr
Monday, May 30; 3:00 pm Game 11	LP: Phillip Reamy (2–2)	Boxscore	WP: Cody Boutte (7–2)	Harris Field; Attendance: 1225; Umpires: HP: Tim Farwig, 1B: Leland Hollis, 2B: Steve Miller, 3B: Craig Mirr

Monday, May 30; 7:00 pm Game 12	(2) Oklahoma City	1–8	(6) Lubbock Christian (TX)	Harris Field; Attendance: 1410; Umpires: HP: Steve Miller, 1B: Craig Mirr, 2B: Tim Farwig, 3B: Leland Hollis
Monday, May 30; 7:00 pm Game 12	LP: Rich Hawkins (10–5)	Boxscore	WP: Tyler Curtis (9–3)	Harris Field; Attendance: 1410; Umpires: HP: Steve Miller, 1B: Craig Mirr, 2B: Tim Farwig, 3B: Leland Hollis
Monday, May 30; 7:00 pm Game 12	HR: Richard Bohlken (23)	Boxscore		Harris Field; Attendance: 1410; Umpires: HP: Steve Miller, 1B: Craig Mirr, 2B: Tim Farwig, 3B: Leland Hollis

Tuesday, May 31; 11:00 am Game 13	(5) Lee (TN)	7–4	(1) Embry–Riddle (FL)	Harris Field; Attendance: 925; Umpires: HP: Leland Hollis, 1B: Reggie Jackson, 2B: Larry Randall, 3B: Steve Miller
Tuesday, May 31; 11:00 am Game 13	WP: Curtis Camilli (9–2)	Boxscore	LP: Daniel Eaton (3–4)	Harris Field; Attendance: 925; Umpires: HP: Leland Hollis, 1B: Reggie Jackson, 2B: Larry Randall, 3B: Steve Miller
Tuesday, May 31; 11:00 am Game 13	HR: Roberto Reyes (13)	Boxscore	HR: Ben Kline (9)	Harris Field; Attendance: 925; Umpires: HP: Leland Hollis, 1B: Reggie Jackson, 2B: Larry Randall, 3B: Steve Miller

Tuesday, May 31; 3:00 pm Game 14	(9) Concordia (CA)	7–4	(2) Oklahoma City	Harris Field; Attendance: 1110; Umpires: HP: Craig Mirr, 1B: Tim Farwig, 2B: Rich Stonum, 3B: Larry Randall
Tuesday, May 31; 3:00 pm Game 14	WP: Jake Hovis (3–3); Sv: Josh White (2)	Boxscore	LP: Terrance Jackson (5–1)	Harris Field; Attendance: 1110; Umpires: HP: Craig Mirr, 1B: Tim Farwig, 2B: Rich Stonum, 3B: Larry Randall
Tuesday, May 31; 3:00 pm Game 14		Boxscore	HR: Mark Purser (4)	Harris Field; Attendance: 1110; Umpires: HP: Craig Mirr, 1B: Tim Farwig, 2B: Rich Stonum, 3B: Larry Randall

Tuesday, May 31; 7:00 pm Game 15	(4) LSU–Shreveport	0–3	(6) Lubbock Christian (TX)	Harris Field
Tuesday, May 31; 7:00 pm Game 15	LP: Jared Mortensen (9–2)	Boxscore	WP: Mike Marshall (9–0)	Harris Field

==== Championship Bracket ====
Wednesday, June 1; 3:00 pm Game 16	(4) LSU–Shreveport	4–8	(9) Concordia (CA)	Harris Field; Attendance: 455; Umpires: HP: Steve Miller, 1B: Craig Mirr, 2B: Larry Randall, 3B: Leland Hollis, LF: Reggie Jackson, RF: Tim Farwig
Wednesday, June 1; 3:00 pm Game 16	LP: Jared Mata (6–5)	Boxscore	WP: Dean Persinger (8–4); Sv: Jacob McBride (2)	Harris Field; Attendance: 455; Umpires: HP: Steve Miller, 1B: Craig Mirr, 2B: Larry Randall, 3B: Leland Hollis, LF: Reggie Jackson, RF: Tim Farwig
Wednesday, June 1; 3:00 pm Game 16	HR: Kevin Smith (16)	Boxscore		Harris Field; Attendance: 455; Umpires: HP: Steve Miller, 1B: Craig Mirr, 2B: Larry Randall, 3B: Leland Hollis, LF: Reggie Jackson, RF: Tim Farwig

Wednesday, June 1; 7:00 pm Game 17	(6) Lubbock Christian (TX)	0–1	(5) Lee (TN)	Harris Field
Wednesday, June 1; 7:00 pm Game 17	LP: Lucas Whitmore (10–3)	Boxscore	WP: Shay Crawford (11–2)	Harris Field

Friday, June 3; 1:00 pm Game 18	(5) Lee (TN)	2–10	(6) Lubbock Christian (TX)	Harris Field
Friday, June 3; 1:00 pm Game 18	LP: Maxx Catapano (9–5)	Boxscore	WP: Tyler Curtis (10–3)	Harris Field
Friday, June 3; 1:00 pm Game 18		Boxscore	HR: Austin Stewart (1)	Harris Field

==== Championship Game ====
Friday, June 3, 7:10 pm PDT at Harris Field – Game 19
Team	1	2	3	4	5	6	7	8	9	R	H	E
Concordia (CA)	0	0	1	3	0	0	0	0	5	9	11	1
Lubbock Christian (TX)	0	0	2	1	0	0	0	0	0	3	6	2
WP: Blake Harrison (8–1) LP: Shane Ingram (3–4); Home runs: CUI: None; LCU: Austin Stewart (2); Attendance: 3075; Umpires: HP: Reggie Jackson, 1B: Craig Mirr, 2B: Tim Farwig, 3B: Steve Miller, LF: Leland Hollis, RF: Larry Randall; Boxscore

== See also ==
- 2011 NAIA softball tournament
- 2011 NCAA Division I baseball tournament
- 2011 NCAA Division II baseball tournament
- 2011 NCAA Division III baseball tournament
