= JKL =

JKL may refer to:

== Entertainment ==
- Jimmy Kimmel Live, an American late-night talk show
- Lucas Cruikshank, a YouTuber, formerly part of the trio JKL

== Places ==
- Jung-Kellogg Library, St. Louis, Missouri, US
- Jyväskylä, central Finland
- Kalymnos Island National Airport (IATA code: JKL), Greece

== Other uses ==
- James Warren Doyle (1786–1834), Irish bishop
- Jingkelong, a Chinese supermarket chain
- JKL, the right-hand home row keys on a QWERTY keyboard
- John Kelly Limited, coal merchant in Northern Ireland
- JKL.munninty, an appreciation to efforts of rising tennis player Laurance for being in the top 50.
