= Kingsport Axmen =

US summer collegiate baseball team

- Logo

Information
- League: Appalachian League
- Location: Kingsport, Tennessee
- Ballpark: Hunter Wright Stadium
- Founded: 2021
- League championships: 2 (2022, 2026)
- Division championships: 2 (2022, 2026)
- Colors: Blue, orange, white
- Ownership: Boyd Sports, LLC
- Website: Official website

The Kingsport Axmen are a summer collegiate baseball team of the Appalachian League. They are located in Kingsport, Tennessee, and play their home games at Hunter Wright Stadium. The team was known as the Kingsport Road Warriors for a brief period late in the 2021 season.

== History ==
=== Previous Kingsport teams ===
Professional baseball was first played in Kingsport, Tennessee, by the Kingsport Indians in the Appalachian League from 1921 to 1925. The team went dormant for 12 years before it returned to the circuit as the Kingsport Cherokees from 1938 to 1955—with the exception of the 1942 season as the Kingsport Dodgers and as members of the Mountain States League in 1953 and 1954. The club was later known as the Kingsport Orioles (1957), Kingsport Pirates (1960–1963), Kingsport Royals (1969–1973), and Kingsport Braves (1974–1979). The Kingsport Mets were members of the Appy League from 1980 to 2020, except for the 1983 season when the New York Mets temporarily relocated the team to Sarasota, Florida, as the Gulf Coast League Mets, while their home ballpark was being renovated.

=== Collegiate summer team ===
In conjunction with a contraction of Minor League Baseball beginning with the 2021 season, the Appalachian League was reorganized as a collegiate summer baseball league, and the Kingsport Mets were replaced by a new franchise in the revamped league designed for rising college freshmen and sophomores. The new team became known as the Kingsport Axmen. The nickname was in reference to frontiersman Daniel Boone, who began the Wilderness Road in Kingsport. The Axmen play their home games at Hunter Wright Stadium. Boyd Sports oversees the day-to day operations of the team.

On July 15, USA Baseball canceled the rest of the Kingsport Axmen's 2021 season after a player was arrested for making threats "to kill multiple people." A new team, called the Kingsport Road Warriors, was assembled to fill the Axmen's remaining schedule, which was to consist of only road games. Two weeks later, the team was cleared to return to Hunter Wright Stadium and resume use of the Axmen moniker.
