= Jung-Kellogg Learning Center =

Library and learning commons in Creve Coeur, Missouri, U.S.

Coordinates: 38°38′29″N 90°27′45″W

The Jung-Kellogg Learning Center (JKL) is the library and learning commons of Missouri Baptist University in Creve Coeur, Missouri. It is a member of the Bridges cluster of the MOBIUS Consortium, a network of libraries in the state of Missouri.

This building was made possible by donations from Dr. J. Marshall Jung and Dr. Frank Kellogg. It is for these two longtime supporters of the university that the building is named.

Originally called the Jung-Kellog Library, it was renamed to the Jung-Kellogg Learning Center after undergoing a major renovation during the summer of 2019. The newly renovated learning center officially reopened on October 18, 2019. For the renovation, the library underwent a significant reduction in its physical collection
