= 1985 NAIA World Series =

1985 NAIA baseball tournament
- 1985 NAIA World Series
- Teams: 10
- Format: Double elimination Page playoff
- Finals site: Harris Field; Lewiston, Idaho
- Champions: Lewis–Clark State (2nd title)
- Winning coach: Ed Cheff
- MVP: Tony Dineen (P) (Lewis–Clark State)

The 1985 NAIA World Series was the 29th annual tournament hosted by the National Association of Intercollegiate Athletics to determine the national champion of baseball among its member colleges and universities in the United States and Canada.

The tournament was played at Harris Field in Lewiston, Idaho.

Hometown team and defending champions Lewis–Clark State (51–20) defeated Dallas Baptist (56–24) in a single-game championship series, 10–6, to win the Warriors' second NAIA World Series.

Lewis–Clark State pitcher Tony Dineen was named tournament MVP.

== Bracket ==
=== Preliminary bracket ===
First round
Elon	1
Saint Francis (IL)	6
Grand View	1
Lewis–Clark State	7
Consolation First Round
Phillips	4
Grand View	3
Southern Maine	5
Elon	11

Second round
Northern Kentucky	6
St. Francis (IL)	8
Dallas Baptist	12
Southern Maine	0
Georgia College	1
Lewis–Clark State	17
Phillips	0
S. California College	7
Consolation Second Round
Northern Kentucky	6
Phillips	13
Georgia College	8
Elon	2

Third round
St. Francis (IL)	2
Dallas Baptist	4
Lewis–Clark State	17
S. California College	2
Consolation Third Round (both teams to semifinals)
St. Francis (IL)	6
Phillips	4
S. California College	6
Georgia College	5

Fourth round (Both teams to semifinals)
Dallas Baptist	3
Lewis–Clark State	8

=== Championship bracket ===
Semifinals
1	Lewis–Clark State	7
Saint Francis (IL)	9
2	Dallas Baptist	9
S. California College	2

Third place final
Saint Francis (IL)	2
2	Dallas Baptist	10

Championship final
1	Lewis–Clark State	10
2	Dallas Baptist	6

== See also ==
- 1985 NCAA Division I baseball tournament
- 1985 NCAA Division II baseball tournament
- 1985 NCAA Division III baseball tournament
- 1985 NAIA Softball World Series
