= Rogers State Hillcats =

- University: Rogers State University
- Nickname: Hillcats
- NCAA: Division II
- Conference: The MIAA (primary); Great American (men's soccer)
- Athletic director: Chris Ratcliff
- Location: Claremore, Oklahoma
- Varsity teams: 14
- Football stadium: none
- Basketball arena: Claremore Expo Center
- Baseball stadium: Diamond Sports Complex
- Colors: Navy and red
- Mascot: Hunter the Hillcat
- Website: rsuhillcats.com
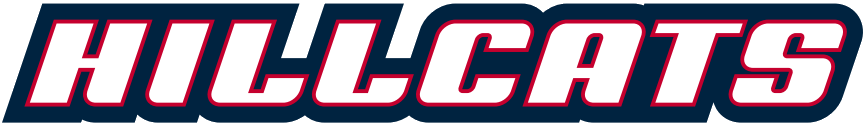

The Rogers State Hillcats are the athletic teams that represent Rogers State University in Claremore, Oklahoma, in intercollegiate sports as a member of the NCAA Division II ranks, primarily competing in the Mid-America Intercollegiate Athletics Association (MIAA) for most of its sports as an associate member since the 2019–20 academic year (before achieving full member status in 2022–23); while its men's soccer team competes in the Great American Conference (GAC). The Hillcats previously competed in the D-II Heartland Conference from 2013–14 to 2018–19; and in the Sooner Athletic Conference (SAC) of the National Association of Intercollegiate Athletics (NAIA) from 2007–08 to 2012–13.

== History ==
=== National athletic affiliation history ===
After two years of offering baseball as a club team, President Dr. Joe Wiley announced the university was accepted into the National Association of Intercollegiate Athletics (NAIA) in September 2005.

The university announced in April 2010 that a task force assembled to review the university's national athletic affiliation recommended the school to apply for membership in the NCAA Division II. On July 13, 2012, Dr. Larry Rice announced that then-Director of Athletic Ryan Bradley was notified that the university had been approved for the Division II membership process. The university was accepted into year two candidacy in July 2014 and in July 2015 entered provisional membership status. Rogers State was notified on July 14, 2016, that the NCAA Division II Membership Committee had recommended the university for full, active membership.

=== Conference affiliation history ===
MIAA logo in Roger State's colors

In September 2006, the university announced it was accepted as a member of the Sooner Athletic Conference of the NAIA. At the start of the 2013 school year, RSU began competing in a schedule within the Heartland Conference, a Division II conference of the NCAA.

On August 29, 2017, Rogers State announced that beginning Fall 2019 it would be members of the Lone Star Conference. However, on October 18, 2018, RSU announced that they would abort their move to the LSC and join the Mid-America Intercollegiate Athletics Association instead.

== Varsity teams ==
Rogers State competes in 14 intercollegiate varsity sports: Men's sports include baseball, basketball, cross country, golf, soccer and track & field (indoor and outdoor); women's sports include basketball, cross country, golf, soccer, softball and track & field (indoor and outdoor).

Men's sports	Women's sports
Baseball	Basketball
Basketball	Cross Country
Cross Country	Golf
Golf	Soccer
Soccer	Softball
Track and field^{†}	Track and field^{†}
† – Track and field includes both indoor and outdoor

== National championships ==
The Hillcats have won one team NCAA national championship.

=== Team ===
Association	Division	Sport	Year	Opponent/Runner-up	Score
NCAA (1)	Division II (1)	Softball (1)	2022	Cal State Dominguez Hills	2–0

== Program success ==
The school's women's softball team became the first RSU athletic team to be nationally ranked on March 28, 2007, entering the NAIA softball ratings at number 22. The men's basketball team became the school's first number one on January 26, 2009, topping the NAIA D-I men's basketball poll.

== Director of athletics ==
Wren Baker, current vice president and director of athletics for North Texas Mean Green, served as the first director of athletics at RSU. After his departure to Northwest Missouri State for a similar position Baker was replaced by Ryan Bradley, previously the Associate Athletic Director for External Relations. Bradley departed for the University of Memphis to work for Baker then deputy athletic director for the Tigers.

In 2013, Ryan Erwin joined Rogers State as the director of athletics from Dallas Baptist University. On August 1, 2016, Erwin announced his resignation to accept the vice president and director of athletics position at East Texas Baptist University (NCAA D-III). On November 18, 2016 President Dr. Larry Rice announced that Chris Ratcliff, director of athletics at the University of Arkansas - Monticello, would assume the role of director of athletics.

== Current department staff ==
Men's program	Head coach	Women's program	Head coach
Cross Country	Matt Kennedy	Cross Country	Matt Kennedy
Baseball	Chris Klimas	Softball	Andrea Vaughan
Basketball	Justin Barkley	Basketball	Heather Davis
Golf	Stephen Brown	Golf	Lexi Johnson
Soccer	Jake Simpson	Soccer	Alex Latorre
Track & Field	Matt Kennedy	Track & Field	Matt Kennedy

Derek Larkin was the first coach in men's soccer program history and was the first coach of the women's soccer program before Heather Cato was named head coach in January 2014. On April 18, 2016, Cato resigned to accept the assistant coach position at Central Michigan. Scott Parkinson was named the third head coach in program history on May 8, 2016. On December 6, 2017, Parkinson announced his resignation to accept the lead assistant coach position with the NWSL's Real Salt Lake.

Larkin stepped away from coaching the Rogers State men's soccer program at the end of the 2024 season, and former Jake Simpson took over from the 2025 season onwards.

Chris McCormick was the first head coach in program history for both the men's and women's cross country and track & field programs. He retired from coaching after the 2019 cross country season, and Oklahoma Baptist head coach Matt Kennedy was hired afterwards.

Justin Barkley is the third head coach in program history. Wren Baker served as athletic director and men's basketball head coach for one season (2007–08) before resigning as basketball coach. Lloyd Williams became the second head coach in program history on August 19, 2008. Williams resigned on March 30, 2010, after two seasons at the helm finishing with a 52–13 record. Barkley was named the head coach in April 2010. Barkley took the Hillcats to the NAIA Tournament in his first two seasons at the helm, and has qualified twice for the NCAA Tournament, in 2020 and 2025.

Bobby Cope is the third head coach of the women's basketball program having served on the coaching staff of both Amy Williams and Roxanne Long. Williams began the program in March 2007 and helped lead the Hillcats to back-to-back NAIA National Tournament appearances before taking the same position at the University of South Dakota. Long was hired on July 2, 2012, and spent two seasons as head coach before resigning following the 2013–14 season. Cope was named head coach on March 28, 2014. Cope left after the 2017-18 season, and Kyle Bent was hired to be the fourth head coach of Hillcat women's basketball from Martin Methodist College. When Bent left after the 2022-23 season, Rogers State hired Heather Davis, who played at MIAA member Central Oklahoma and coached at UCO and Southwestern Oklahoma.

Ron Bradley began the baseball program at RSU in 2004 as a club team and by 2012 led the Hillcats to the NAIA World Series Championship game where RSU finished Runner-Up. Bradley led the Diamond Cats back to the NAIA World Series in 2013 before retiring following the 2014 season compiling a 281–188 collegiate coaching record. On June 30, 2014, Chris Klimas was named the second head coach in program history joining RSU from Oklahoma Baptist University where he had served as associate head coach.

RSU announced the addition of Women's and Men's golf programs in January 2009 and two months later named former Oklahoma Sooners, Iowa Hawkeyes, and Florida Gators head coach Lynn Blevins as head coach of both programs. Blevins announced his resignation in June 2014 and the Hillcats turned to former University of Texas - Pan American men's golf head coach Josh Fosdick to lead both men's and women's programs. Fosdick resigned in July 2016 after accepting the men's golf head coaching position at the University of Central Oklahoma. T.J. Dickinson, head coach at Oklahoma Wesleyan, was named as Fosdick's replacement in August 2016. In August 2017, Ratcliff announced the hiring of former Hillcat women's golfer Whitney Hocutt as the new women's golf head coach and Steve Brown, former assistant at NCAA Division II Chico State, as men's golf head coach.

== Facilities ==
- Claremore Expo Center - Home of Hillcat Basketball
- RCB Bank Sports Complex - Home of Rogers State Baseball of Softball
- Soldier Field - Original home of Oklahoma Military Academy football games, current home of Rogers State Soccer

Rogers State Golf has three courses that they practice and compete at, between Heritage Hills Golf Course in Claremore, Cherokee Hills Golf Club in Catoosa, and Bailey Ranch Golf Club in Owasso.

== Mascot ==
Their mascot, a fictional animal based on a bobcat and named for the hill that the school sits upon, was chosen in 2005 by a group of students.
