= 1989 NAIA World Series =

1989 NAIA baseball tournament
- 1989 NAIA World Series
- Teams: 10
- Format: Double elimination Page playoff
- Finals site: Harris Field; Lewiston, Idaho
- Champions: Lewis–Clark State (5th title)
- Winning coach: Ed Cheff
- MVP: John NesSmith (P) (Lewis–Clark State)

The 1989 NAIA World Series was the 33rd annual tournament hosted by the National Association of Intercollegiate Athletics to determine the national champion of baseball among its member colleges and universities in the United States and Canada.

The tournament was played at Harris Field in Lewiston, Idaho.

Hometown team and two-time defending champions Lewis–Clark State (41–24) defeated Saint Francis (IL) (53–21) in a single-game championship series, 5–2, to win the Warriors' fifth NAIA World Series. This would go on to be the third of six consecutive World Series championships for the program.

Lewis–Clark State pitcher John NesSmith was named tournament MVP.

== Bracket ==
=== Preliminary bracket ===
First round
Lewis–Clark State | 7
Point Park | 3
Dallas Baptist | 5
North Florida | 6
Consolation First Round
Dallas Baptist | 10
Elon | 3
Point Park | 1
West Florida | 5

Second round
Hawaii–Hilo | 6
Lewis–Clark State | 12
Saint Francis (IL) | 13
West Florida | 3
Oklahoma Baptist | 6
North Florida | 3
Elon | 2
Wisconsin–Stout | 3
Consolation Second Round
Hawaii–Hilo | 5
Dallas Baptist | 6
North Florida | 8
West Florida | 6

Third round
Lewis–Clark State | 7
Saint Francis (IL) | 4
Oklahoma Baptist | 7
Wisconsin–Stout | 1
Consolation Third Round (both teams to Semifinals)
Saint Francis (IL) | 10
Dallas Baptist | 5
Wisconsin–Stout | 5
North Florida | 7

Fourth round (both teams to Semifinals)
Lewis–Clark State | 12
Oklahoma Baptist | 4

=== Championship bracket ===
Semifinals
Lewis–Clark State | 10
North Florida | 5
Oklahoma Baptist | 0
Saint Francis (IL) | 9

Championship
Lewis–Clark State | 5
Saint Francis (IL) | 2

== See also ==
- 1989 NCAA Division I baseball tournament
- 1989 NCAA Division II baseball tournament
- 1989 NCAA Division III baseball tournament
- 1989 NAIA Softball World Series
