= 1988 NAIA World Series =

1988 NAIA baseball tournament
- 1988 NAIA World Series
- Teams: 10
- Format: Double elimination Page playoff
- Finals site: Harris Field; Lewiston, Idaho
- Champions: Lewis–Clark State (4th title)
- Winning coach: Ed Cheff
- MVP: Steve Callahan (P) (Lewis–Clark State)

The 1988 NAIA World Series was the 32nd annual tournament hosted by the National Association of Intercollegiate Athletics to determine the national champion of baseball among its member colleges and universities in the United States and Canada.

The tournament was played at Harris Field in Lewiston, Idaho.

Hometown team and defending champions Lewis–Clark State (45–20) defeated Grand Canyon (49–20) in a single-game championship series, 9–3, to win the Warriors' fourth NAIA World Series. This would go on to be the second of six consecutive World Series championships for the program.

Lewis–Clark State pitcher Steve Callahan was named tournament MVP.

== Bracket ==
=== Preliminary bracket ===
First round
Central Washington	8
Dallas Baptist	7
Georgetown (KY)	6
Lewis–Clark State	8
Consolation First Round
Winona State	3
Georgetown (KY)	10
Cumberland (TN)	4
Dallas Baptist	9

Second round
Grand Canyon	10
Central Washington	4
Cumberland (TN)	4
Oklahoma City	6
Point Park	0
Lewis–Clark State	4
Saint Xavier	9
Winona State	5
Consolation Second Round
Central Washington	4
Georgetown (KY)	5
Point Park	5
Dallas Baptist	7

Third round
Grand Canyon	2
Oklahoma City	7
Lewis–Clark State	15
Saint Xavier	2
Consolation Third Round (both teams to Semifinals)
Grand Canyon	15
Georgetown (KY)	5
Saint Xavier	5
Dallas Baptist	4

Fourth round (both teams to Semifinals)
Oklahoma City	4
Lewis–Clark State	7

=== Championship bracket ===
Semifinals
1	Lewis–Clark State	12
Grand Canyon	13
2	Oklahoma City	5
Saint Xavier	8

Third place final
Grand Canyon	12
Saint Xavier	4

Championship final
1	Lewis–Clark State	9
Grand Canyon	3

== See also ==
- 1988 NCAA Division I baseball tournament
- 1988 NCAA Division II baseball tournament
- 1988 NCAA Division III baseball tournament
- 1988 NAIA Softball World Series
