= Missouri Baptist University =

Private university in Creve Coeur, Missouri, US

- Other name: MOBAP
- Former names: St. Louis Baptist College (1957–1964); Missouri Baptist College (1964–2002)
- Type: Private
- Established: 1957; 69 years ago
- Religious affiliation: Missouri Baptist Convention (Southern Baptist Convention)
- Endowment: $5 million
- President: Keith L. Ross
- Provost: Andy Chambers
- Faculty: 230
- Students: 5,309
- Location: Creve Coeur, Missouri, United States; 38°38′30″N 90°27′44″W
- Campus: Suburban
- Colors: Navy Blue & White
- Nickname: Spartans
- Sporting affiliations: NAIA – American Midwest
- Website: mobap.edu

Missouri Baptist University (MBU or MoBap) is a private university in Creve Coeur, Missouri, United States. It is one of three universities of the Missouri Baptist Convention (Southern Baptist Convention). The main campus is located on a 68-acre (28 ha) site near Creve Coeur and Town and County in West St Louis County, off highway 64-40. There are currently 12 MBU locations including its regional learning centers throughout the St. Louis region and Illinois. The school enrolled 5,309 students in 2019.

== History ==
In 1957, a growing need for an evangelical Christian institution in Greater St. Louis prompted the opening of a campus extension of Hannibal–LaGrange College (now Hannibal–LaGrange University) at Tower Grove Baptist Church. Sixty-eight students were enrolled that inaugural year.

Classes for the extension center, also known as St. Louis Baptist College, met in the activities building of Tower Grove Baptist Church. In 1964, Missouri Baptist College was chartered as an evangelical Christian, four-year liberal arts college. Under the auspices of Hannibal-LaGrange College and the direction of its president, L.A. Foster, Bible courses were offered for pastors and laymen. During the second term, several liberal arts courses were requested and provided. Student influence, along with organizational work of St. Louis Baptist leaders, pastors and laymen, influenced MBU's charter. The first meeting of the Board of Trustees for Missouri Baptist College was held in January 1964. Frank Kellogg served as the first chairman of the Board of Trustees and later as the second president.

In July 1964, leaders acquired the site of MBU's main campus, metropolitan land near Interstate 270 and U.S. Route 40 in West Saint Louis County. In September 1968, 186 students began classes, more than tripling the institution's size in just over a decade. In May 1973, Missouri Baptist College graduated its first class of twenty-nine students, each earning a Bachelor of Arts degree.

In 1980, Missouri Baptist College began a new chapter of its life with the completion of the Pillsbury-Huff Residence Halls, converting from a commuter campus to a residential institution. In the fall of 1986, MBC began offering courses in both Jefferson and Franklin counties.

R. Alton Lacey took the reins of Missouri Baptist University in 1995 as the university's sixth president. Under his leadership, MBU's enrollment more than doubled; the university introduced graduate, post-graduate programs, and new undergraduate degrees; and MBU held a successful $10 million campaign, the largest development project in MBU's history.

In April 2000, the college was approved to offer the Master of Science in Education. Today the MBU graduate program includes a Master of Business Administration and a Master of Arts in Christian Ministry and an expanded offering of its initial graduate program, the Master of Science in Education.

In the spring of 2002, the campus completed the Spirit of Excellence campaign with the dedication of the new $10 million Pillsbury Chapel and Dale Williams Fine Arts Center. The building, encompassing more than 58,000 sq ft (5,400 m^{2}) acts as a host to musical, religious, business, educational and community events. The Spirit of Excellence campaign also led to the renovation of the Thomas and Virginia Field Academic Hall, a much larger cafeteria and bookstore, a new student lounge, an improved computer lab and numerous offices and classrooms. Also in 2002, Missouri Baptist College became Missouri Baptist University. In the fall of 2005, MBU's enrollment reached an all-time high of 4,460 students. At its thirty-fourth commencement exercises, MBU conferred 579 degrees, another MBU record. During the summer of 2007, MBU's Jung-Kellogg Library was renovated and a new coffeehouse added. In the Fall Semester of 2009, the university began offering its first doctorate program, a Doctorate of Education.

The university was granted an exception to Title IX in 2016 which allows it to legally discriminate against LGBT students for religious reasons.

In 2017, R. Alton Lacey announced his retirement after 23 years as MBU president. In the fall of 2017, Keith L. Ross was appointed as MBU's seventh president. Lacey assumed the role as chancellor in January 2018.

There were ongoing renovations to the library and major additions to the football field during the summer of 2019. The library has now been transformed into a learning commons space. In 2019, after a 17 year lawsuit Missouri Baptist University came back under the jurisdiction of the Missouri Baptist Convention Board of trustees.

== Academics ==
As of December 2018, Missouri Baptist offers over fifty degree programs through both undergraduate and graduate degrees. Degrees are offered through their schools of business, education, and nursing, and their divisions of fine arts, humanities, natural sciences, health & sports sciences, interdisciplinary studies, counseling (graduate), and social & behavioral sciences. They also offer several master's degrees programs and some doctorates in education. The university is accredited by the Higher Learning Commission.

== Campus ==
Missouri Baptist campus has several residential dorms, a Chapel/Fine Arts center, a recreation complex, a second gymnasium, a football field, a library, coffee house, bookstore, academic building and administration/science building. The dining hall is located within the academic building. MBU's school of nursing is located off-site in a nearby medical office building

== Athletics ==
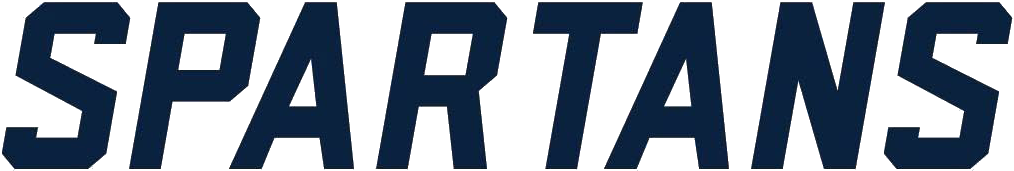
MBU athletics wordmark

The Missouri Baptist athletic teams are called the Spartans. The university is a member of the National Association of Intercollegiate Athletics (NAIA), primarily competing in the American Midwest Conference (AMC) for most of its sports since the 1986–87 academic year; while its men's and women's lacrosse teams compete in the Kansas Collegiate Athletic Conference (KCAC), its men's volleyball team competes in the Heart of America Athletic Conference (HAAC), and its football team competes in the Midwest League of the Mid-States Football Association (MSFA).

Missouri Baptist competes in 28 intercollegiate varsity sports: Men's sports include baseball, basketball, bowling, cross country, football, golf, lacrosse, soccer, tennis, track & field, volleyball and wrestling; while women's sports include basketball, beach volleyball, bowling, cross country, dance, golf, lacrosse, soccer, softball, stunt, tennis, track & field, volleyball and wrestling; and co-ed sports include cheerleading and eSports.

== Notable alumni ==
- Nick Christie - racewalker
- Khalia Collier - commissioner of GWBA, owner of St. Louis Surge
- Brian DeLunas - professional baseball coach
- Ben Harris - politician
- Helen Maroulis - Olympic freestyle wrestler
- Ana Mercado - volleyball player
- Jeff Roorda - politician
- Lawrence Olum - professional soccer player
- Lee Winfield - professional basketball player
