= Hunter Wright Stadium =

Baseball park in Kingsport, Tennessee, US

- Location within Tennessee
- Former names: Kingsport Sports Complex
- Address: 800 Granby Road
- Location: Kingsport, Tennessee; United States
- Coordinates: 36°33′46″N 82°35′55″W
- Capacity: 2,500
- Type: Baseball stadium
- Surface: Grass
- Field size: Left field: 330 feet (100 m); Center field: 410 feet (120 m); Right field: 330 feet (100 m)

Construction
- Built: 1995

Tenants
- Kingsport Mets (AL) 1995–2020; Gate City High School; Dobyns-Bennett High School; Kingsport Axmen (AL) from 2021

Website
- Official website

Hunter Wright Stadium is a baseball park in Kingsport, Tennessee, named for the popular multi-term former mayor. It is the home field of Kingsport Axmen of the summer collegiate Appalachian League. It was previously home to the Kingsport Mets, a Rookie-level Minor League Baseball affiliate of the New York Mets of the Appalachian League from 1995 to 2020. Built in 1995, it seats 2,500 people.

The stadium's location, just a couple of miles from the Tennessee-Virginia line, allows Gate City High School in nearby Gate City, Virginia, to rent the field for its baseball games, making Hunter Wright the home field for its Blue Devils baseball team. The facility also hosts a few home games for Kingsport's Dobyns-Bennett High School Indians, returning the favor from when the K-Mets played at the high school's field.

Since 1998, it has hosted the Coca-Cola Classic, a series of baseball games between local high school teams.
