= Harris Field =

- Location in the United States Location in Idaho
- Interactive map of Harris Field
- Former names: NICE Field, Logger Field
- Address: 6th Street & 10th Avenue
- Location: Lewis–Clark State College; Lewiston, Idaho, U.S.
- Coordinates: 46.41°N 117.025°W
- Elevation: 850 ft (260 m) AMSL
- Owner: Lewis–Clark State College
- Capacity: 5,000
- Surface: Natural grass
- Field size: Left Field – 315 ft (96 m); Left Center – 365 ft (111 m); Center Field – 385 ft (117 m); Right Center – 360 ft (110 m); Right Field – 335 ft (102 m)

Tenants
- Lewis–Clark State Warriors (NAIA); Lewis-Clark Twins (Am. Legion, AA); Lewis-Clark Cubs (Am. Legion, A)

Harris Field is a college baseball park in the western United States, located in Lewiston, Idaho. An on-campus venue with a seating capacity of 5,000, it is the home field of the Warriors of Lewis–Clark State College, a top program in National Association of Intercollegiate Athletics (NAIA). Since 1984, LCSC has won nineteen national titles and had six runner-up finishes.

The ballpark became Harris Field 76 years ago in 1950, while the college was known as North Idaho College of Education (NICE) and its teams were the Loggers. It was named for Loyd Harris (1883–1969), a local businessman, civic leader, and baseball booster. He was active in baseball as a player, manager, and club director since 1904. Previously, the diamond was simply known as NICE Field.

Lights were added to Harris Field in the summer of 1975, and it has hosted the NAIA World Series more than twenty times, from 1984 through 1991, and continuously since 2000. In the summer, the ballpark hosts the local American Legion teams, the Lewis-Clark Twins (AA) and Cubs (A). The playing surface at Harris Field was overhauled in the summer of 2014 as earth was rebalanced with heavy equipment. A new irrigation system was installed as well as 110,000 square feet (2.5 acres; 1.0 ha) of new sod.

The field's elevation is approximately 850 feet (260 m) above sea level and has an unorthodox southwest alignment; the recommended orientation (homeplate to center field) is east-northeast. The center field fence is close at 385 feet (117 m), restricted by the Mechanical Technical Building.

Lewiston's minor league clubs, the Indians (1937, 1939) and Broncs (1952–1974), played at Bengal Field, about nine blocks east, near the high school. Lights were installed prior to the 1937 baseball season, and the opener was a night game. Owned by the school district, Bengal Field was formerly the home of the high school and Legion baseball programs and hosted the American Legion World Series in 1973. It has been a football-only venue since autumn 1983 and the 3,500-seat baseball grandstand at 15th Street was removed. The LHS Bengals baseball team now plays at Dwight Church Field (46.38°N 116.962°W) in the southeast part of the city.
