= 2022 NAIA baseball tournament =

- Teams: 46
- Finals site: Harris Field; Lewiston, Idaho
- Champions: Southeastern (FL) (2nd title)
- Winning coach: Adrian Dinkel
- MVP: Brian Fuentes (Southeastern)

The 2022 NAIA baseball tournament was the 65th edition of the NAIA baseball championship. The 46-team tournament began on May 16 with Opening Round games across ten different sites and concluded with the 2022 NAIA World Series in Lewiston, Idaho that began on May 27 and ended on June 3. Southeastern (FL) defeated host Lewis–Clark State 11–5 in a winner-take-all championship for their second title in program history. Lewis–Clark State forced a winner-take-all championship game with a 10–9 victory over Southeastern earlier in the day.

For the first time since the Opening Round format began in 2009, the World Series host would be playing in the Opening Round instead of getting a direct entry into the NAIA World Series. To accommodate the automatic bid for the World Series host in the Opening Round, the tournament field expanded from 45 to 46 teams along with a tenth Opening Round site being added.

The 46 participating teams were selected from all eligible NAIA teams. The World Series host and 30 teams were awarded automatic bids as either champions and/or runners-up of their conferences, and 15 teams were selected at-large by the National Selection Committee. Teams were then placed into one of ten pre-determined Opening Round sites, with six sites consisting of five teams and four sites consisting of four teams, each of which is conducted via a double-elimination tournament. The winners of each of the Opening Round sites participated in the NAIA World Series.

== Tournament procedure ==
A total of 46 teams entered the tournament, with Lewis–Clark State receiving an automatic bid into the Opening Round as World Series host. 30 automatic bids were determined by either winning their conference's regular season championship, conference tournament, and/or conference tournament runner-up. The other 15 bids were at-large, with selections determined by the NAIA Baseball National Selection Committee.

== Opening round hosts ==
Opening Round hosts

Venue	Location	Host(s)
Don Roddy Field	Bellevue, NE	Bellevue University
Harrison Field	Montgomery, AL	Faulkner University
Grizzly Baseball Complex	Lawrenceville, GA	Georgia Gwinnett College
Harris Field	Lewiston, ID	Lewis-Clark State College
Pilot Field	Shreveport, LA	Louisiana State University Shreveport
Jim Wade Stadium	Oklahoma City, OK	Oklahoma City University
Paul Demie Mainieri Field	Miami Gardens, FL	St. Thomas University (FL)
Winterholter Field	Upland, IN	Taylor University
Hunter Wright Stadium	Kingsport, TN	Visit Kingsport; Appalachian Athletic Conference
Russell Carr Field	Santa Barbara, CA	Westmont College

== Bids ==
=== Automatic ===
School	Conference	Record	Berth	Last NAIA Appearance
Antelope Valley (CA)	Cal Pac	37–11	Regular season champion	2019 (Santa Barbara Bracket)
Bellevue (NE)	North Star	45–10	Tournament champion	2021 (Bellevue Bracket)
British Columbia	Cascade	29–23	Tournament runner-up	2019 (Macon Bracket)
Bryan (TN)	Appalachian	27–26	Tournament champion	2021 (Lakeland Bracket)
Central Methodist (MO)	Heart	42–13	Tournament champion	2021 NAIA World Series
Concordia (NE)	Great Plains	36–15–1	Tournament champion	2021 NAIA World Series
Cumberlands (KY)	Mid-South	43–14	Tournament champion	2021 (Williamsburg Bracket)
Doane (NE)	Great Plains	37–12	Regular season champion	2021 (O'Fallon Bracket)
Fisher (MA)	Continental	29–28	Tournament runner-up	2021 (Lakeland Bracket)
Freed–Hardeman (TN)	Mid-South	37–15	Tournament runner-up	2021 (Montgomery Bracket)
Georgia Gwinnett	Continental	41–14	Tournament champion	2021 NAIA World Series
Hope International (CA)	Golden State	41–13	Tournament champion	2021 (Santa Barbara Bracket)
IU–Southeast	River States	39–13	Tournament champion	2021 NAIA World Series
Judson (IL)	Chicagoland	21–28	Tournament runner-up	2018 (Lincoln Bracket)
Kansas Wesleyan	Kansas	34–27	Tournament champion	2011 (Lubbock Bracket)
Lewis-Clark State (ID)	Cascade	51–4	World Series host	2021 NAIA World Series
LSU–Alexandria	Red River	33–14	Tournament champion	2018 (Montgomery Bracket)
LSU–Shreveport	Red River	47–5	Regular season champion	2021 NAIA World Series
Lyon (AR)	American Midwest	36–20	Tournament champion	2019 (Williamsburg Bracket)
Madonna (MI)	Wolverine-Hoosier	27–13	Tournament runner-up	2018 (Kingsport Bracket)
MidAmerica Nazarene (KS)	Heart	36–16	Tournament runner-up	2021 (Bellevue Bracket)
Mount Vernon Nazarene (OH)	Crossroads	37–17	Regular season champion	2021 (Kingsport Bracket)
Northwestern Ohio	Wolverine-Hoosier	37–12	Regular season champion	2021 (Kingsport Bracket)
Oklahoma City	Sooner	47–4	Tournament champion	2021 (New Orleans Bracket)
Olivet Nazarene (IL)	Chicagoland	38–15	Regular season champion	2021 (Marion Bracket)
Ottawa (KS)	Kansas	42–8	Regular season champion	2021 (New Orleans Bracket)
Saint Katherine (CA)	Cal Pac	31–21	Tournament runner-up	2021 (Santa Barbara Bracket)
Southeastern (FL)	The Sun	51–3	Tournament champion	2021 NAIA World Series
Taylor (IN)	Crossroads	39–16	Tournament champion	2018 (Upland Bracket)
Tennessee Wesleyan	Appalachian	51–5	Tournament champion	2021 (Kingsport Bracket)
William Carey (MS)	Southern States	37–15	Tournament champion	2021 (O'Fallon Bracket)

=== At–Large ===
School	Conference	Record	Last NAIA Appearance
Columbia (MO)	American Midwest	38–12	2021 (Marion Bracket)
Faulkner (AL)	Southern States	34–15	2021 NAIA World Series
Keiser (FL)	The Sun	35–20	2021 NAIA World Series
Loyola (LA)	Southern States	33–22	2021 (New Orleans Bracket)
McPherson (KS)	Kansas	35–13–1	2021 (O'Fallon Bracket)
Middle Georgia State	Southern States	30–19–1	2021 (Lakeland Bracket)
Point Park (PA)	River States	37–14	2021 (Williamsburg Bracket)
Reinhardt (GA)	Appalachian	35–21	2021 (Williamsburg Bracket)
Science & Arts (OK)	Sooner	35–13	2021 (Bellevue Bracket)
St. Thomas (FL)	The Sun	38–17	2021 (Montgomery Bracket)
Tabor (KS)	Kansas	37–17–1	2017 (Hutchinson Bracket)
Vanugard (CA)	Golden State	43–13	2021 (Montgomery Bracket)
Warner (FL)	The Sun	40–16	2021 (Kingsport Bracket)
Webber International (FL)	The Sun	38–19	2019 (Kingsport Bracket)
Westmont (CA)	Golden State	42–11	2021 (Santa Barbara Bracket)

== Opening Round ==
=== Bellevue Bracket ===
Hosted by Bellevue (NE) at Don Roddy Field

First round
4	Concordia (NE)	1
5	Judson (IL)	5
First round
4	Concordia (NE)	10
2	Central Methodist	3

Second round
1	Bellevue (NE)	4
5	Judson	0
2	Central Methodist (MO)	2
3	Tabor (KS)	5^{10}
Second round
5	Judson	1
4	Concordia (NE)	8

Semifinals
1	Bellevue	7
3	Tabor	2
Semifinals
3	Tabor	5
4	Concordia (NE)	7

Finals
1	Bellevue	2	5
4	Concordia (NE)	16	2

=== Kingsport Bracket ===
Hosted by Visit Kingsport/Appalachian Athletic Conference at Hunter Wright Stadium

First round
4	Mount Vernon Nazarene (OH)	9
5	Madonna (MI)	6
First round
5	Madonna	6
2	Warner	5

Second round
1	Tennessee Wesleyan	11
4	Mount Vernon Nazarene	8
2	Warner (FL)	2
3	Cumberlands (KY)	4
Second round
4	Mount Vernon Nazarene	12^{10}
5	Madonna	11

Semifinals
1	Tennessee Wesleyan	14
3	Cumberlands (KY)	1
Semifinals
3	Cumberlands (KY)	19
4	Mount Vernon Nazarene	6

Finals
1	Tennessee Wesleyan	8	7
3	Cumberlands (KY)	30	5

=== Lawrenceville Bracket ===
Hosted by Georgia Gwinnett at Grizzly Baseball Complex

First round
1	Hope International (CA)	8
4	Point Park (PA)	20
Winner's bracket
3	William Carey (MS)	8
2	Georgia Gwinnett	14
1	Hope International	14
3	William Carey	6
Loser's bracket

Semifinals
4	Point Park	5
2	Georgia Gwinnett	10
1	Hope International	15
4	Point Park	4

Finals
2	Georgia Gwinnett	13	–
1	Hope International	1	–

=== Lewiston Bracket ===
Hosted by Lewis–Clark State (ID) at Harris Field

First round
4	British Columbia	15
5	Saint Katherine (CA)	2
First round
5	Saint Katherine	3
2	Vanguard	8

Second round
1	Lewis–Clark State (ID)	9
4	British Columbia	7
2	Vanguard (CA)	1
3	Doane (NE)	3
Second round
4	British Columbia	7
2	Vanguard	4

Semifinals
1	Lewis–Clark State	18
3	Doane	8
Semifinals
3	Doane	3
4	British Columbia	9

Finals
1	Lewis–Clark State	4	6
4	British Columbia	7	3

=== Miami Gardens Bracket ===
Hosted by St. Thomas (FL) at Paul Demie Mainieri Field

First round
1	St. Thomas (FL)	5
4	Middle Georgia State	1
Winner's bracket
3	Webber International (FL)	13
2	McPherson (KS)	6
4	Middle Georgia State	9
2	McPherson	15
Loser's bracket

Semifinals
1	St. Thomas (FL)	4
3	Webber International	5^{11}
2	McPherson	4
1	St. Thomas (FL)	5^{11}

Finals
3	Webber International	2	17
1	St. Thomas (FL)	8	6

=== Montgomery Bracket ===
Hosted by Faulkner (AL) at Harrison Field

First round
1	Ottawa (KS)	5
4	Reinhardt (GA)	4
Winner's bracket
3	Keiser (FL)	6
2	Faulkner (AL)	7
4	Reinhardt	11^{10}
3	Keiser	6
Loser's bracket

Semifinals
1	Ottawa (KS)	1
2	Faulkner	15
4	Reinhardt	7
1	Ottawa (KS)	4

Finals
2	Faulkner	11	–
4	Reinhardt	8	–

=== Oklahoma City Bracket ===
Hosted by Oklahoma City at Jim Wade Stadium

First round
4	LSU–Alexandria	3
5	Kansas Wesleyan	8
First round
4	LSU–Alexandria	4
2	Freed–Hardeman	6

Second round
1	Oklahoma City	7
5	Kansas Wesleyan	5
2	Freed–Hardeman (TN)	6
3	MidAmerica Nazarene (KS)	7
Second round
5	Kansas Wesleyan	9
2	Freed–Hardeman	17

Semifinals
1	Oklahoma City	5
3	MidAmerica Nazarene	6
Semifinals
1	Oklahoma City	9
2	Freed–Hardeman	5

Finals
3	MidAmerica Nazarene	9	–
1	Oklahoma City	5	–

=== Santa Barbara Bracket ===
Hosted by Westmont (CA) at Russell Carr Field

First round
1	Westmont (CA)	6
4	Antelope Valley (CA)	0
Winner's bracket
3	Olivet Nazarene (IL)	4
2	IU–Southeast	22
4	Antelope Valley	4
3	Olivet Nazarene	1
Loser's bracket

Semifinals
1	Westmont	9
2	IU–Southeast	3
4	Antelope Valley	3
2	IU–Southeast	2

Finals
1	Westmont	12	–
4	Antelope Valley	0	–

=== Shreveport Bracket ===
Hosted by LSU–Shreveport at Pilot Field

First round
4	Loyola (LA)	13
5	Fisher (MA)	2
First round
5	Fisher	2
2	Science & Arts	13

Second round
1	LSU–Shreveport	4
4	Loyola (LA)	7
2	Science & Arts (OK)	4
3	Lyon (AR)	10
Second round
1	LSU–Shreveport	10
2	Science & Arts	2

Semifinals
4	Loyola (LA)	9
3	Lyon	5
Semifinals
3	Lyon	6
1	LSU–Shreveport	14

Finals
4	Loyola (LA)	2	7
1	LSU–Shreveport	16	9^{10}

=== Upland Bracket ===
Hosted by Taylor (IN) at Winterholter Field

First round
4	Columbia (MO)	9
5	Bryan (TN)	15
First round
4	Columbia (MO)	2
3	Taylor	3

Second round
1	Southeastern (FL)	9
5	Bryan	5
2	Northwestern Ohio	12
3	Taylor (IN)	8
Second round
5	Bryan	6
3	Taylor	1

Semifinals
1	Southeastern (FL)	9
2	Northwestern Ohio	6
Semifinals
2	Northwestern Ohio	4
5	Bryan	7

Finals
1	Southeastern (FL)	9	–
5	Bryan	5	–

== NAIA World Series ==
The NAIA World Series was held at Harris Field in Lewiston, Idaho.

=== Participants ===
School	Conference	Record	Head Coach	Bracket	Previous NAIA WS Appearances	Best NAIA WS Finish	NAIA WS Record
Bellevue (NE)	North Star	48–11	Duane Monlux	Bellevue	14 (last: 2019)	1st (1995)	25–27
Faulkner (AL)	Southern States	37–15	Patrick McCarthy	Montgomery	9 (last: 2021)	1st (2013)	20–16
Georgia Gwinnett	Continental	37–7	Jeremy Sheetinger	Lawrenceville	4 (last: 2021)	1st (2021)	11–8
Lewis–Clark State (ID)	Cascade	54–5	Jake Taylor	Lewiston	39 (last: 2021)	1st (1984, 1985, 1987, 1988, 1989, 1990, 1991, 1992, 1996, 1999, 2000, 2002, 2003, 2006, 2007, 2008, 2015, 2016, 2017)	147–52
LSU–Shreveport	Red River	51–6	Brad Neffendorf	Shreveport	4 (last: 2021)	3rd (2003, 2012)	9–8
MidAmerica Nazarene (KS)	Heart	39–16	Ryan Thompson	Oklahoma City	none	none	0–0
Southeastern (FL)	The Sun	54–3	Adrian Dinkel	Upland	3 (last: 2021)	1st (2018)	8–4
Tennessee Wesleyan	Appalachian	53–6	Billy Berry	Kingsport	5 (last: 2019)	1st (2012, 2019)	11–8
Webber International (FL)	The Sun	41–20	Collin Martin	Miami Gardens	none	none	0–0
Westmont (CA)	Golden State	45–11	Robert Ruiz	Santa Barbara	none	none	0–0

=== Bracket ===
==== Preliminary Bracket ====
First round Friday, May 27; Saturday, May 28
8	Georgia Gwinnett	7
9	MidAmerica Nazarene	6
7	Faulkner	7
10	Webber International	2
First round Sunday, May 29; Losers eliminated
10	Webber International	2
6	Westmont	0
9	MidAmerica Nazarene	4
5	Bellevue	5

First round Friday, May 27; Saturday, May 28; Second round Saturday, May 28
1	Southeastern	9
8	Georgia Gwinnett	7
4	LSU–Shreveport	8
5	Bellevue	4
2	Tennessee Wesleyan	4
7	Faulkner	7
3	Lewis–Clark State	9
6	Westmont	5
Second round Monday, May 30; Losers eliminated
8	Georgia Gwinnett	5
10	Webber International	11
2	Tennessee Wesleyan	3
5	Bellevue	2

Third round Monday, May 30; Winners to Championship Bracket
1	Southeastern	8
4	LSU–Shreveport	4
7	Faulkner	1
3	Lewis–Clark State	7
Third round (Note: Bracket was adjusted after Game 12 to match teams in the loser's bracket who had not yet faced each other.); Tuesday, May 31; Winners to Championship Bracket
4	LSU–Shreveport	3
7	Faulkner	2
2	Tennessee Wesleyan	9
10	Webber International	1

Fourth Round; Tuesday, May 31
1	Southeastern	9
3	Lewis–Clark State	5

==== Championship Bracket ====
Semifinals; Wednesday, June 1
1	Southeastern	8^{10}
2	Tennessee Wesleyan	7
4	LSU–Shreveport	1
3	Lewis–Clark State	4

Finals (Note: Both championship games were moved up to Thursday, June 2 due to impending weather. The second championship game was suspended due to rain/lightning and resumed on Friday, June 3.); Thursday, June 2 Friday, June 3
1	Southeastern	9	11
3	Lewis–Clark State	10	5

=== Game Results ===
All game times are listed in Pacific Daylight Time (UTC−07:00).

==== Preliminary Bracket ====
Friday, May 27; 8:30 am Game 1	(9) MidAmerica Nazarene	6–7	(8) Georgia Gwinnett	Harris Field; Attendance: 480; Umpires: HP: Jay Allen, 1B: Colin Price, 2B: Steve Sillers, 3B: Daniel Rios
Friday, May 27; 8:30 am Game 1	LP: Zach Trevino (10–4)	Boxscore	WP: Gavin Heltemes (8–1); Sv: Jonathan Haab (3)	Harris Field; Attendance: 480; Umpires: HP: Jay Allen, 1B: Colin Price, 2B: Steve Sillers, 3B: Daniel Rios
Friday, May 27; 8:30 am Game 1	HR: Noah Castillo 2 (9)	Boxscore		Harris Field; Attendance: 480; Umpires: HP: Jay Allen, 1B: Colin Price, 2B: Steve Sillers, 3B: Daniel Rios

Friday, May 27; 11:30 am Game 2	(5) Bellevue	4–8	(4) LSU–Shreveport	Harris Field; Attendance: 1280; Umpires: HP: Torrell Poole, 1B: Nicholas Katchur, 2B: Cory Ray, 3B: Creal Waddell
Friday, May 27; 11:30 am Game 2	LP: McGrane Pledger (10–4)	Boxscore	WP: Kevin Miranda (13–1); Sv: Chase Guitreau (4)	Harris Field; Attendance: 1280; Umpires: HP: Torrell Poole, 1B: Nicholas Katchur, 2B: Cory Ray, 3B: Creal Waddell
Friday, May 27; 11:30 am Game 2	HR: Brenton Davis (17), Andrew Ishii (12)	Boxscore	HR: Allbry Major 2 (10)	Harris Field; Attendance: 1280; Umpires: HP: Torrell Poole, 1B: Nicholas Katchur, 2B: Cory Ray, 3B: Creal Waddell

Saturday, May 28; 10:00 am Game 3	(10) Webber International	2–7	(7) Faulkner	Harris Field; Attendance: 1010; Umpires: HP: Steve Sillers, 1B: Daniel Rios, 2B: Jay Allen, 3B: Colin Price
Saturday, May 28; 10:00 am Game 3	LP: Dylan Martin (10–4)	Boxscore	WP: July Sosa (12–1)	Harris Field; Attendance: 1010; Umpires: HP: Steve Sillers, 1B: Daniel Rios, 2B: Jay Allen, 3B: Colin Price
Saturday, May 28; 10:00 am Game 3	HR: Drake Dobyanski (4)	Boxscore	HR: Justice Lucas (4)	Harris Field; Attendance: 1010; Umpires: HP: Steve Sillers, 1B: Daniel Rios, 2B: Jay Allen, 3B: Colin Price

Saturday, May 28; 1:00 pm Game 4	(6) Westmont	5–9	(3) Lewis–Clark State	Harris Field; Attendance: 3775; Umpires: HP: Cory Ray, 1B: Creal Waddell, 2B: Torrell Poole, 3B: Nicholas Katchur
Saturday, May 28; 1:00 pm Game 4	LP: Bryan Peck (7–4)	Boxscore	WP: Trent Sellers (13–0)	Harris Field; Attendance: 3775; Umpires: HP: Cory Ray, 1B: Creal Waddell, 2B: Torrell Poole, 3B: Nicholas Katchur
Saturday, May 28; 1:00 pm Game 4	HR: Josh Rego (10)	Boxscore	HR: Aidan Nagle (16), Luke White (20)	Harris Field; Attendance: 3775; Umpires: HP: Cory Ray, 1B: Creal Waddell, 2B: Torrell Poole, 3B: Nicholas Katchur

Saturday, May 28; 4:00 pm Game 5	(7) Faulkner	7–4	(2) Tennessee Wesleyan	Harris Field; Attendance: 810; Umpires: HP: Colin Price, 1B: Jay Allen, 2B: Daniel Rios, 3B: Steve Sillers
Saturday, May 28; 4:00 pm Game 5	WP: J.C. Toro (6–2); Sv: Brayan Garcia (9)	Boxscore	LP: Kobe Foster (13–1)	Harris Field; Attendance: 810; Umpires: HP: Colin Price, 1B: Jay Allen, 2B: Daniel Rios, 3B: Steve Sillers
Saturday, May 28; 4:00 pm Game 5	HR: Kevin Saenz (8), Jordan Funk (7)	Boxscore	HR: Livan Reinoso (31), Zach Hogueisson (15)	Harris Field; Attendance: 810; Umpires: HP: Colin Price, 1B: Jay Allen, 2B: Daniel Rios, 3B: Steve Sillers

Saturday, May 28; 7:00 pm Game 6	(8) Georgia Gwinnett	7–9	(1) Southeastern	Harris Field; Attendance: 640; Umpires: HP: Creal Waddell, 1B: Torrell Poole, 2B: Nicholas Katchur, 3B: Cory Ray
Saturday, May 28; 7:00 pm Game 6	LP: Tuck Tucker (3–3)	Boxscore	WP: Alex Munroe (6–0)	Harris Field; Attendance: 640; Umpires: HP: Creal Waddell, 1B: Torrell Poole, 2B: Nicholas Katchur, 3B: Cory Ray
Saturday, May 28; 7:00 pm Game 6	HR: Livingston Morris (19), Chase Evans (9)	Boxscore	HR: Gary Lora (19), Sam Faith (6)	Harris Field; Attendance: 640; Umpires: HP: Creal Waddell, 1B: Torrell Poole, 2B: Nicholas Katchur, 3B: Cory Ray

Sunday, May 29; 12:00 pm Game 7	(5) Bellevue	5–4	(9) MidAmerica Nazarene	Harris Field; Attendance: – Umpires: HP: Daniel Rios, 1B: Steve Sillers, 2B: Colin Price, 3B: Jay Allen
Sunday, May 29; 12:00 pm Game 7	WP: Alexandro Celiceo (7–1); Sv: Elijah Johnson (2)	Boxscore	LP: Eric Navarette (5–6)	Harris Field; Attendance: – Umpires: HP: Daniel Rios, 1B: Steve Sillers, 2B: Colin Price, 3B: Jay Allen
Sunday, May 29; 12:00 pm Game 7	HR: Brenton Davis (18)	Boxscore	HR: Joey Calamaio (2), Noah Castillo (10), Joshuan Sandoval (16)	Harris Field; Attendance: – Umpires: HP: Daniel Rios, 1B: Steve Sillers, 2B: Colin Price, 3B: Jay Allen

Sunday, May 29; 3:00 pm Game 8	(6) Westmont	0–2	(10) Webber International	Harris Field; Attendance: 280; Umpires: HP: Nicholas Katchur, 1B: Cory Ray, 2B: Creal Waddell, 3B: Torrell Poole
Sunday, May 29; 3:00 pm Game 8	LP: Bradley Heacock (8–3)	Boxscore	WP: Xavier Rodriguez (8–3); Sv: Dawson Young (3)	Harris Field; Attendance: 280; Umpires: HP: Nicholas Katchur, 1B: Cory Ray, 2B: Creal Waddell, 3B: Torrell Poole

Monday, May 30; 10:30 am Game 9	(2) Tennessee Wesleyan	3–2	(5) Bellevue	Harris Field; Attendance: 330; Umpires: HP: Steve Sillers, 1B: Colin Price, 2B: Jay Allen, 3B: Creal Waddell
Monday, May 30; 10:30 am Game 9	WP: Robert Gonzalez (10–3); Sv: Liam Doolan (10)	Boxscore	LP: Blake Crippen (11–4)	Harris Field; Attendance: 330; Umpires: HP: Steve Sillers, 1B: Colin Price, 2B: Jay Allen, 3B: Creal Waddell
Monday, May 30; 10:30 am Game 9	HR: Braxton Turner (8)	Boxscore	HR: Alec Ackerman (19)	Harris Field; Attendance: 330; Umpires: HP: Steve Sillers, 1B: Colin Price, 2B: Jay Allen, 3B: Creal Waddell

Monday, May 30; 1:30 pm Game 10	(10) Webber International	11–5	(8) Georgia Gwinnett	Harris Field; Attendance: – Umpires: HP: Cory Ray, 1B: Daniel Rios, 2B: Torrell Poole, 3B: Nicholas Katchur
Monday, May 30; 1:30 pm Game 10	WP: Rey Rodriguez (4–2)	Boxscore	LP: Rob Hamby (8–3)	Harris Field; Attendance: – Umpires: HP: Cory Ray, 1B: Daniel Rios, 2B: Torrell Poole, 3B: Nicholas Katchur
Monday, May 30; 1:30 pm Game 10		Boxscore	HR: Blaze O'Saben (3)	Harris Field; Attendance: – Umpires: HP: Cory Ray, 1B: Daniel Rios, 2B: Torrell Poole, 3B: Nicholas Katchur

Monday, May 30; 4:30 pm Game 11	(1) Southeastern	8–4	(4) LSU–Shreveport	Harris Field; Attendance: 1820; Umpires: HP: Jay Allen, 1B: Creal Waddell, 2B: Steve Sillers, 3B: Colin Price
Monday, May 30; 4:30 pm Game 11	WP: Ronnie Voacolo (4–0)	Boxscore	LP: Brad White (8–1)	Harris Field; Attendance: 1820; Umpires: HP: Jay Allen, 1B: Creal Waddell, 2B: Steve Sillers, 3B: Colin Price
Monday, May 30; 4:30 pm Game 11	HR: Brian Fuentes (21), Stephen Cullen (11), Jose Marcano (6)	Boxscore	HR: Allbry Major (11)	Harris Field; Attendance: 1820; Umpires: HP: Jay Allen, 1B: Creal Waddell, 2B: Steve Sillers, 3B: Colin Price

Monday, May 30; 7:30 pm Game 12	(3) Lewis–Clark State	7–1	(7) Faulkner	Harris Field; Attendance: 2490; Umpires: HP: Torrell Poole, 1B: Nicholas Katchur, 2B: Cory Ray, 3B: Daniel Rios
Monday, May 30; 7:30 pm Game 12	WP: Dawson Day (11–0)	Boxscore	LP: Alexis Saldana (5–2)	Harris Field; Attendance: 2490; Umpires: HP: Torrell Poole, 1B: Nicholas Katchur, 2B: Cory Ray, 3B: Daniel Rios
Monday, May 30; 7:30 pm Game 12	HR: Justin Mazzone (5)	Boxscore		Harris Field; Attendance: 2490; Umpires: HP: Torrell Poole, 1B: Nicholas Katchur, 2B: Cory Ray, 3B: Daniel Rios

Tuesday, May 31; 11:00 am Game 13	(2) Tennessee Wesleyan	9–1	(10) Webber International	Harris Field; Attendance: 465; Umpires: HP: Nicholas Katchur, 1B: Daniel Rios, 2B: Jay Allen, 3B: Torrell Poole
Tuesday, May 31; 11:00 am Game 13	WP: Kyle Bloor (10–0)	Boxscore	LP: Dylan Martin (10–5)	Harris Field; Attendance: 465; Umpires: HP: Nicholas Katchur, 1B: Daniel Rios, 2B: Jay Allen, 3B: Torrell Poole
Tuesday, May 31; 11:00 am Game 13	HR: Carson Ford (14), Livan Reinoso (32)	Boxscore		Harris Field; Attendance: 465; Umpires: HP: Nicholas Katchur, 1B: Daniel Rios, 2B: Jay Allen, 3B: Torrell Poole

Tuesday, May 31; 3:00 pm Game 14	(4) LSU–Shreveport	3–2	(7) Faulkner	Harris Field; Attendance: 720; Umpires: HP: Creal Waddell, 1B: Cory Ray, 2B: Colin Price, 3B: Steve Sillers
Tuesday, May 31; 3:00 pm Game 14	WP: Josh Fortenberry (2–0); Sv: Allbry Major (1)	Boxscore	LP: Nicholas Graham (3–4)	Harris Field; Attendance: 720; Umpires: HP: Creal Waddell, 1B: Cory Ray, 2B: Colin Price, 3B: Steve Sillers
Tuesday, May 31; 3:00 pm Game 14	HR: Trevor Burkhart (3)	Boxscore		Harris Field; Attendance: 720; Umpires: HP: Creal Waddell, 1B: Cory Ray, 2B: Colin Price, 3B: Steve Sillers

Tuesday, May 31; 6:30 pm Game 15	(1) Southeastern	9–5	(3) Lewis–Clark State	Harris Field; Attendance: 3130; Umpires: HP: Daniel Rios, 1B: Jay Allen, 2B: Torrell Poole, 3B: Nicholas Katchur
Tuesday, May 31; 6:30 pm Game 15	WP: Bryce Moyle (4–0); Sv: Ronnie Voacolo (3)	Boxscore	LP: Eric Chavarria (8–2)	Harris Field; Attendance: 3130; Umpires: HP: Daniel Rios, 1B: Jay Allen, 2B: Torrell Poole, 3B: Nicholas Katchur
Tuesday, May 31; 6:30 pm Game 15	HR: Brian Fuentes (22), Isaac Nunez (10), Stephen Cullen (12)	Boxscore	HR: Riley Way (9), Nick Seamons (12)	Harris Field; Attendance: 3130; Umpires: HP: Daniel Rios, 1B: Jay Allen, 2B: Torrell Poole, 3B: Nicholas Katchur

==== Championship Bracket ====
Wednesday, June 1; 3:00 pm Game 16	(3) Lewis–Clark State	5–1	(4) LSU–Shreveport	Harris Field; Attendance: 2805
Wednesday, June 1; 3:00 pm Game 16	WP: Trent Sellers (14–0); Sv: Greg Blackman (5)	Boxscore	LP: Trent Sholders (1–2)	Harris Field; Attendance: 2805
Wednesday, June 1; 3:00 pm Game 16	HR: Pu'ukani De Sa (5)	Boxscore		Harris Field; Attendance: 2805

Wednesday, June 1; 6:30 pm Game 17	(2) Tennessee Wesleyan	7–8 (F/10)	(1) Southeastern	Harris Field; Attendance: 1310; Umpires: HP: Colin Price, 1B: Torrell Poole, 2B: Creal Waddell, 3B: Nicholas Katchur
Wednesday, June 1; 6:30 pm Game 17	LP: Livan Reinoso (0–1)	Boxscore	WP: Damien Torres (2–0)	Harris Field; Attendance: 1310; Umpires: HP: Colin Price, 1B: Torrell Poole, 2B: Creal Waddell, 3B: Nicholas Katchur
Wednesday, June 1; 6:30 pm Game 17	HR: Dan Sayre (5)	Boxscore	HR: Shamir Morales (1)	Harris Field; Attendance: 1310; Umpires: HP: Colin Price, 1B: Torrell Poole, 2B: Creal Waddell, 3B: Nicholas Katchur

==== Championship Games ====
===== First Game =====
Thursday, June 2 1:00 pm PDT at Harris Field Game 18
Team	1	2	3	4	5	6	7	8	9	R	H	E
Southeastern	0	2	1	0	1	0	3	0	2	9	12	2
Lewis–Clark State	0	4	0	4	0	1	1	0	X	10	15	0
WP: Lucas Gregory (2–0) LP: Robb Adams (14–2) Sv: Dawson Day (1); Home runs: SEU: Thomas Broyles (4), Brian Fuentes 3 (25); LCSC: Pu'ukani De Sa (6); Attendance: 2010; Umpires: HP: Creal Waddell, 1B: Nicholas Katchur, 2B: Colin Price, 3B: Cory Ray; Boxscore

===== Second Game =====
Thursday, June 2 5:00 pm PDT at Harris Field Game 19
Team	1	2	3	4	5	6	7	8	9	R	H	E
Lewis–Clark State	0	0	0	0	5	0	0	0	0	5	9	3
Southeastern	0	1	3	0	1	0	6	0	X	11	13	0
WP: Damien Torres (3–0) LP: Greg Blackman (5–3); Home runs: LCSC: None; SEU: Abdel Guadalupe (19), Gary Lora (20); Attendance: 2520; Umpires: HP: Daniel Rios, 1B: Jay Allen, 2B: Creal Waddell, 3B: Colin Price; Notes: Game was suspended due to rain in the bottom of the 7th with Southeastern up to bat and the bases loaded leading 6–5. Play resumed from that point on Friday, June 3 at 8:15 am. Boxscore

== See also ==
- 2022 NAIA softball tournament
- 2022 NCAA Division I baseball tournament
- 2022 NCAA Division II baseball tournament
- 2022 NCAA Division III baseball tournament
