= 2021 NAIA baseball tournament =

- Teams: 46
- Finals site: Harris Field; Lewiston, Idaho
- Champions: Georgia Gwinnett (1st title)
- Winning coach: Jeremy Sheetinger
- MVP: Hunter Dollander (Georgia Gwinnett)

The 2021 NAIA baseball tournament was the 64th edition of the NAIA baseball championship. The 46-team tournament began on May 17 with Opening Round games across nine different sites and concluded with the 2021 NAIA World Series in Lewiston, Idaho that began on May 28 and ended on June 3. Georgia Gwinnett defeated Central Methodist (MO) 8–4 in the championship game for their first title in program history. This was the most recent championship game(s) in which both teams would be vying for their first national title.

The 46 participating teams were selected from all eligible NAIA teams with the World Series host receiving an automatic bid to the NAIA World Series. The remaining 45 teams participated in the Opening Round with 30 teams being awarded automatic bids as either champions and/or runners-up of their conferences, and 15 teams were selected at-large by the National Selection Committee. Teams were then placed into one of nine pre-determined Opening Round sites of five teams a piece, each of which is conducted via a double-elimination tournament. The winners of each of the Opening Round sites plus the World Series host team participated in the NAIA World Series.

This would be the final year in which the team hosting the NAIA World Series would bypass the Opening Round and directly receive an automatic bid to the World Series.

== Tournament procedure ==
A total of 46 teams entered the tournament. As World Series host, Lewis–Clark State received an automatic bid into the NAIA World Series. 30 automatic bids were determined by either winning their conference's regular season championship, conference tournament, and/or conference tournament runner-up. The other 15 bids were at-large, with selections determined by the NAIA Baseball National Selection Committee.

== Opening round hosts ==
On May 3, the NAIA announced the nine opening round host sites, which were played from May 17–20.

Opening Round hosts

Venue(s)	Location(s)	Host(s)
Brown Park; Don Roddy Field	Omaha, NE; Bellevue, NE	Bellevue University
CarShield Field	O'Fallon, MO	Central Methodist University
Doyle Buhl Stadium	Williamsburg, KY	University of the Cumberlands
Harrison Field	Montgomery, AL	Faulkner University
Wildcat Field	Marion, IN	Indiana Wesleyan University
Segnette Field	Westwego, LA	Loyola University New Orleans
Chain of Lakes Park	Winter Haven, FL	Southeastern University
Hunter Wright Stadium	Kingsport, TN	Visit Kingsport; Appalachian Athletic Conference
Russell Carr Field	Santa Barbara, CA	Westmont College

== Bids ==
=== Automatic ===
School	Conference	Record	Berth	Last NAIA Appearance
Bryan (TN)	Appalachian	35–16	Pool B champion	2019 (Miami Gardens Bracket)
Central Methodist (MO)	Heart	42–6	Tournament champion	2019 (Montgomery Bracket)
Columbia (MO)	American Midwest	36–9	Tournament champion	2019 (Shreveport Bracket)
Concordia (NE)	Great Plains	38–9	Regular season champion	2019 (Henderson Bracket)
Corban (OR)	Cascade	22–29	Tournament runner-up	First appearance
Cumberlands (KY)	Mid-South	46–6	Tournament champion	2019 (Williamsburg Bracket)
Doane (NE)	Great Plains	35–17–1	Regular season runner-up	2014 (Hutchinson Bracket)
Fisher (MA)	A.I.I.	31–20	Tournament runner-up	First appearance
Freed–Hardeman (TN)	Mid-South	26–23	Tournament runner-up	2019 NAIA World Series
Georgia Gwinnett	A.I.I.	42–9	Tournament champion	2019 NAIA World Series
Indiana Tech	Wolverine-Hoosier	31–25	Regular season champion	2019 NAIA World Series
Indiana Wesleyan	Crossroads	43–12	Regular season champion	2018 (Lawrenceville Bracket)
IU–Southeast	River States	45–14	Tournament champion	2019 (Lawrenceville Bracket)
Lewis-Clark State (ID)	Cascade	41–4	World Series host	2019 NAIA World Series
LSU–Shreveport	Red River	40–13	Tournament champion	2019 (Shreveport Bracket)
Mayville State (ND)	North Star	35–16	Tournament champion	2017 (Oklahoma City Bracket)
MidAmerica Nazarene (KS)	Heart	39–14	Tournament runner-up	2017 (Lima Bracket)
Mount Vernon Nazarene (OH)	Crossroads	32–19	Tournament runner-up	2015 (Grand Rapids Bracket)
Northwestern Ohio	Wolverine-Hoosier	29–17	Tournament champion	2018 NAIA World Series
Oklahoma Wesleyan	Kansas	46–8	Regular season champion	2019 (Henderson Bracket)
Olivet Nazarene (IL)	Chicagoland	36–18	Regular season champion	2019 (Montgomery Bracket)
Ottawa (KS)	Kansas	35–18	Tournament champion	First appearance
Our Lady of the Lake (TX)	Red River	34–17	Regular season champion	First appearance
Point Park (PA)	River States	37–14	Tournament runner-up	2018 (Williamsburg Bracket)
Saint Katherine (CA)	Cal Pac	29–16	Tournament champion	First appearance
Saint Xavier (IL)	Chicagoland	32–25	Tournament runner-up	2019 (Lawrenceville Bracket)
Science & Arts (OK)	Sooner	34–10	Tournament champion	2019 NAIA World Series
Southeastern (FL)	The Sun	47–7	Tournament champion	2019 NAIA World Series
Tennessee Wesleyan	Appalachian	51–4	Pool A champion	2019 NAIA World Series
Vanugard (CA)	Golden State	37–14	Tournament champion	2016 (Faulkner Bracket)
William Carey (MS)	Southern States	34–10	Tournament champion	2018 (Hattiesburg Bracket)

=== At–Large ===
School	Conference	Record	Last NAIA Appearance
Bellevue (NE)	North Star	38–16	2019 NAIA World Series
Benedictine (KS)	Kansas	34–14	First appearance
Benedictine–Mesa (AZ)	Cal Pac	31–14	First appearance
Faulkner (AL)	Southern States	35–9	2019 NAIA World Series
Hope International (CA)	Golden State	27–13	2019 (Montgomery Bracket)
Keiser (FL)	The Sun	33–16	2018 (Lawrenceville Bracket)
Loyola (LA)	Southern States	36–13	First appearance
McPherson (KS)	Kansas	36–13	First appearance
Middle Georgia State	Southern States	34–19	2019 (Macon Bracket)
Oklahoma City	Sooner	33–17	2019 (Shreveport Bracket)
Reinhardt (GA)	Appalachian	32–19	2018 NAIA World Series
St. Thomas (FL)	The Sun	33–19	2019 NAIA World Series
USC–Beaufort	The Sun	31–21	2016 (Savannah Bracket)
Warner (FL)	The Sun	33–21	2009 (Group 4 Bracket)
Westmont (CA)	Golden State	27–18	2019 (Santa Barbara Bracket)

== Opening Round ==
=== Bellevue Bracket ===
Hosted by Bellevue (NE) at Don Roddy Field in Bellevue, NE and Brown Park in Omaha, NE

First round
4	Bellevue (NE)	8
5	Saint Xavier (IL)	3
First round
5	Saint Xavier (IL)	3
2	MidAmerica Nazarene	9

Second round
1	Science & Arts (OK)	2
4	Bellevue	4
2	MidAmerica Nazarene (KS)	2
3	Concordia (NE)	4
Second round
1	Science & Arts	4
2	MidAmerica Nazarene	6

Semifinals
4	Bellevue	7
3	Concordia (NE)	3
Semifinals
3	Concordia (NE)	11
2	MidAmerica Nazarene	10

Finals
4	Bellevue	8	5
3	Concordia (NE)	13	7

=== Kingsport Bracket ===
Hosted by Visit Kingsport/Appalachian Athletic Conference at Hunter Wright Stadium

First round
4	Northwestern Ohio	4
5	Mount Vernon Nazarene (OH)	5
First round
4	Northwestern Ohio	7
3	Warner	3

Second round
1	Tennessee Wesleyan	12
5	Mount Vernon Nazarene	3
2	IU–Southeast	10
3	Warner (FL)	9
Second round
5	Mount Vernon Nazarene	20
4	Northwestern Ohio	1

Semifinals
1	Tennessee Wesleyan	3
2	IU–Southeast	4
Semifinals
1	Tennessee Wesleyan	5
5	Mount Vernon Nazarene	3

Finals
2	IU–Southeast	16	–
1	Tennessee Wesleyan	10	–

=== Lakeland Bracket ===
Hosted by Southeastern (FL) at Chain of Lakes Park in Winter Haven, FL

First round
4	USC–Beaufort	7
5	Fisher (MA)	4
First round
5	Fisher	5
3	Bryan	13

Second round
1	Southeastern (FL)	10
4	USC–Beaufort	5
2	Middle Georgia State	2
3	Bryan (TN)	1
Second round
4	USC–Beaufort	6
3	Bryan	11

Semifinals
1	Southeastern (FL)	5
2	Middle Georgia State	4
Semifinals
2	Middle Georgia State	5^{11}
3	Bryan	2

Finals
1	Southeastern (FL)	18	–
2	Middle Georgia State	4	–

=== Marion Bracket ===
Hosted by Indiana Wesleyan at Wildcat Field

First round
4	Olivet Nazarene (IL)	2
5	Indiana Tech	5
First round
4	Olivet Nazarene	4
3	Columbia (MO)	14

Second round
1	Oklahoma Wesleyan	7
5	Indiana Tech	3
2	Indiana Wesleyan	2
3	Columbia (MO)	1
Second round
5	Indiana Tech	6
3	Columbia (MO)	2

Semifinals
1	Oklahoma Wesleyan	14
2	Indiana Wesleyan	6
Semifinals
2	Indiana Wesleyan	6
5	Indiana Tech	11

Finals
1	Oklahoma Wesleyan	11	12
5	Indiana Tech	13	4

=== Montgomery Bracket ===
Hosted by Faulkner (AL) at Harrison Field

First round
4	Freed–Hardeman (TN)	11
5	Our Lady of the Lake (TX)	2
First round
5	Our Lady of the Lake	7
3	St. Thomas (FL)	14

Second round
1	Vanguard (CA)	6
4	Freed–Hardeman	1
2	Faulkner (AL)	4
3	St. Thomas (FL)	3
Second round
4	Freed–Hardeman	7
3	St. Thomas (FL)	6

Semifinals
1	Vanguard	3
2	Faulkner	7
Semifinals
1	Vanguard	11
4	Freed–Hardeman	9

Finals
2	Faulkner	5	20
1	Vanguard	6^{10}	10

=== New Orleans Bracket ===
Hosted by Loyola (LA) at Segnette Field

First round
4	Benedictine (KS)	2
5	Ottawa (KS)	5
First round
4	Benedictine (KS)	3
3	Oklahoma City	4^{13}

Second round
1	Loyola (LA)	1
5	Ottawa (KS)	4
2	Keiser (FL)	8
3	Oklahoma City	0
Second round
1	Loyola (LA)	3
3	Oklahoma City	4^{12}

Semifinals
5	Ottawa (KS)	5
2	Keiser	19
Semifinals
5	Ottawa (KS)	0
3	Oklahoma City	7

Finals
2	Keiser	7	–
3	Oklahoma City	3	–

=== O'Fallon Bracket ===
Hosted by Central Methodist (MO) at CarShield Field

First round
4	McPherson (KS)	7
5	Doane (NE)	2
First round
5	Doane	1
3	Benedictine–Mesa	7

Second round
1	Central Methodist (MO)	17
4	McPherson	8
2	William Carey (MS)	2
3	Benedictine–Mesa (AZ)	1
Second round
4	McPherson	8
3	Benedictine–Mesa	1

Semifinals
1	Central Methodist	6
2	William Carey	4
Semifinals
2	William Carey	10
4	McPherson	2

Finals
1	Central Methodist	7	–
2	William Carey	2	–

=== Santa Barbara Bracket ===
Hosted by Westmont (CA) at Russell Carr Field

First round
4	Saint Katherine (CA)	3
5	Corban (OR)	0
First round
5	Corban	4
3	Westmont	11

Second round
1	Georgia Gwinnett	13
4	Saint Katherine	6
2	Hope International (CA)	10
3	Westmont (CA)	5
Second round
4	Saint Katherine	5
3	Westmont	12

Semifinals
1	Georgia Gwinnett	5
2	Hope International	8
Semifinals
1	Georgia Gwinnett	14
3	Westmont	4

Finals
2	Hope International	4	2
1	Georgia Gwinnett	12	5

=== Williamsburg Bracket ===
Hosted by Cumberlands (KY) at Doyle Buhl Stadium

First round
4	Point Park (PA)	9
5	Mayville State (ND)	3
First round
5	Mayville State	1
3	Reinhardt	2

Second round
1	Cumberlands (KY)	2
4	Point Park	6
2	LSU–Shreveport	7
3	Reinhardt (GA)	3
Second round
1	Cumberlands (KY)	1
3	Reinhardt	5

Semifinals
4	Point Park	9
2	LSU–Shreveport	7
Semifinals
2	LSU–Shreveport	15
3	Reinhardt	6

Finals
4	Point Park	1	1
2	LSU–Shreveport	8	6

== NAIA World Series ==
The NAIA World Series was held at Harris Field in Lewiston, Idaho.

=== Participants ===
School	Conference	Record	Head Coach	Bracket	Previous NAIA WS Appearances	Best NAIA WS Finish	NAIA WS Record
Central Methodist (MO)	Heart	45–6	Nate Breland	O'Fallon	none	none	0–0
Concordia (NE)	Great Plains	42–10	Ryan Dupic	Bellevue	none	none	0–0
Faulkner (AL)	Southern States	38–10	Patrick McCarthy	Montgomery	8 (last: 2019)	1st (2013)	18–14
Georgia Gwinnett	A.I.I.	46–10	Jeremy Sheetinger	Santa Barbara	3 (last: 2019)	3rd (2018, 2019)	5–6
IU–Southeast	River States	48–14	Ben Reel	Kingsport	none	none	0–0
Keiser (FL)	The Sun	36–16	Brook Fordyce	New Orleans	1 (last: 2017)	T-7th (2017)	1–2
Lewis–Clark State (ID)	Cascade	41–4	Jake Taylor	n/a	38 (last: 2019)	1st (1984, 1985, 1987, 1988, 1989, 1990, 1991, 1992, 1996, 1999, 2000, 2002, 2003, 2006, 2007, 2008, 2015, 2016, 2017)	145–50
LSU–Shreveport	Red River	44–14	Brad Neffendorf	Williamsburg	3 (last: 2012)	3rd (2003, 2012)	8–6
Oklahoma Wesleyan	Kansas	49–9	Kirk Kelley	Marion	2 (last: 2017)	3rd (2014)	3–4
Southeastern (FL)	The Sun	50–7	Adrian Dinkel	Lakeland	2 (last: 2019)	1st (2018)	7–2

=== Bracket ===
==== Preliminary Bracket ====
First round Friday, May 28
8	Keiser	3
9	LSU–Shreveport	10
7	IU–Southeast	4
10	Concordia (NE)	2
First round Saturday, May 29; Losers eliminated
10	Concordia (NE)	0
3	Lewis–Clark State	10
8	Keiser	8
4	Oklahoma Wesleyan	3

First round Friday, May 28; Second round Saturday, May 29
1	Southeastern	25
9	LSU–Shreveport	13
4	Oklahoma Wesleyan	6
5	Georgia Gwinnett	9
2	Central Methodist	11
7	IU–Southeast	5
3	Lewis–Clark State	0
6	Faulkner	4
Second round Monday, May 31; Losers eliminated
9	LSU–Shreveport	6
3	Lewis–Clark State	9
7	IU–Southeast	9
8	Keiser	7

Third round Monday, May 31; Winners to Championship Bracket
1	Southeastern	7
5	Georgia Gwinnett	11
2	Central Methodist	4
6	Faulkner	3
Third round (Note: Bracket was adjusted after Game 12 to match teams in the loser's bracket who had not yet faced each other.); Tuesday, June 1 Winners to Championship Bracket
1	Southeastern	6
3	Lewis–Clark State	10
6	Faulkner	14
7	IU–Southeast	10

Fourth Round; Tuesday, June 1
5	Georgia Gwinnett	9
2	Central Methodist	3

==== Championship Bracket ====
Semifinals; Wednesday, June 2
5	Georgia Gwinnett	15
6	Faulkner	10
3	Lewis–Clark State	5
2	Central Methodist	8

Final; Thursday, June 3
5	Georgia Gwinnett	8	–
2	Central Methodist	4	–

=== Game Results ===
All game times are listed in Pacific Daylight Time (UTC−07:00).

==== Preliminary Bracket ====
Friday, May 28; 8:30 am Game 1	(9) LSU–Shreveport	10–3	(8) Keiser	Harris Field; Attendance: 440; Umpires: HP: Nicholas Katchur, 1B: Colin Price, 2B: Scott Jones, 3B: Bill Gannaway
Friday, May 28; 8:30 am Game 1	WP: Sebastian Selway (7–3); Sv: Kevin Miranda (1)	Boxscore	LP: James Reynolds (7–4)	Harris Field; Attendance: 440; Umpires: HP: Nicholas Katchur, 1B: Colin Price, 2B: Scott Jones, 3B: Bill Gannaway
Friday, May 28; 8:30 am Game 1	HR: Payton Robertson (8)	Boxscore		Harris Field; Attendance: 440; Umpires: HP: Nicholas Katchur, 1B: Colin Price, 2B: Scott Jones, 3B: Bill Gannaway

Friday, May 28; 11:30 am Game 2	(5) Georgia Gwinnett	9–6	(4) Oklahoma Wesleyan	Harris Field; Attendance: 480; Umpires: HP: Tyler Schmidt, 1B: Daniel Rios, 2B: Jeff Kopecky, 3B: Creal Waddell
Friday, May 28; 11:30 am Game 2	WP: Hunter Dollander (11–1)	Boxscore	LP: Billy Wall (3–2)	Harris Field; Attendance: 480; Umpires: HP: Tyler Schmidt, 1B: Daniel Rios, 2B: Jeff Kopecky, 3B: Creal Waddell
Friday, May 28; 11:30 am Game 2	HR: Griffin Keller (17), Livingston Morris (13), Chase Evans (6)	Boxscore	HR: Cody Muncy (27)	Harris Field; Attendance: 480; Umpires: HP: Tyler Schmidt, 1B: Daniel Rios, 2B: Jeff Kopecky, 3B: Creal Waddell

Friday, May 28; 3:00 pm Game 3	(10) Concordia (NE)	2–4	(7) IU–Southeast	Harris Field; Attendance: 520; Umpires: HP: Colin Price, 1B: Scott Jones, 2B: Bill Gannaway, 3B: Nicholas Katchur
Friday, May 28; 3:00 pm Game 3	LP: Jake Fosgett (9–1)	Boxscore	WP: Gavin Knust (2–0)	Harris Field; Attendance: 520; Umpires: HP: Colin Price, 1B: Scott Jones, 2B: Bill Gannaway, 3B: Nicholas Katchur
Friday, May 28; 3:00 pm Game 3		Boxscore	HR: Marco Romero (7)	Harris Field; Attendance: 520; Umpires: HP: Colin Price, 1B: Scott Jones, 2B: Bill Gannaway, 3B: Nicholas Katchur

Friday, May 28; 7:00 pm Game 4	(6) Faulkner	4–0	(3) Lewis–Clark State	Harris Field; Umpires: HP: Daniel Rios, 1B: Jeff Kopecky, 2B: Creal Waddell, 3B: Tyler Schmidt
Friday, May 28; 7:00 pm Game 4	WP: Antonio Frias (12–0)	Boxscore	LP: Eric Chavarria (8–2)	Harris Field; Umpires: HP: Daniel Rios, 1B: Jeff Kopecky, 2B: Creal Waddell, 3B: Tyler Schmidt
Friday, May 28; 7:00 pm Game 4	HR: Shawn Ross (14), Isaac Phillips (4)	Boxscore		Harris Field; Umpires: HP: Daniel Rios, 1B: Jeff Kopecky, 2B: Creal Waddell, 3B: Tyler Schmidt

Saturday, May 29; 8:30 am Game 5	(8) Keiser	8–3	(4) Oklahoma Wesleyan	Harris Field; Umpires: HP: Jeff Kopecky, 1B: Bill Gannaway, 2B: Tyler Schmidt, 3B: Colin Price
Saturday, May 29; 8:30 am Game 5	WP: Pablo Arevalo (10–3)	Boxscore	LP: Crosby Bringhurst (9–1)	Harris Field; Umpires: HP: Jeff Kopecky, 1B: Bill Gannaway, 2B: Tyler Schmidt, 3B: Colin Price
Saturday, May 29; 8:30 am Game 5		Boxscore	HR: Danny Perez (20), Seth Delgado (13)	Harris Field; Umpires: HP: Jeff Kopecky, 1B: Bill Gannaway, 2B: Tyler Schmidt, 3B: Colin Price

Saturday, May 29; 11:30 am Game 6	(3) Lewis–Clark State	10–0	(10) Concordia (NE)	Harris Field; Attendance: 340; Umpires: HP: Scott Jones, 1B: Creal Waddell, 2B: Nicholas Katchur, 3B: Daniel Rios
Saturday, May 29; 11:30 am Game 6	WP: Trent Sellers (7–1)	Boxscore	LP: Alex Johnson (2–1)	Harris Field; Attendance: 340; Umpires: HP: Scott Jones, 1B: Creal Waddell, 2B: Nicholas Katchur, 3B: Daniel Rios
Saturday, May 29; 11:30 am Game 6	HR: Dalton Harum (7)	Boxscore		Harris Field; Attendance: 340; Umpires: HP: Scott Jones, 1B: Creal Waddell, 2B: Nicholas Katchur, 3B: Daniel Rios

Saturday, May 29; 3:00 pm Game 7	(9) LSU–Shreveport	13–25	(1) Southeastern	Harris Field; Attendance: 210; Umpires: HP: Bill Gannaway, 1B: Tyler Schmidt, 2B: Colin Price, 3B: Jeff Kopecky
Saturday, May 29; 3:00 pm Game 7	LP: Nathan Cachu (2–1)	Boxscore	WP: Christian Camacho (11–1)	Harris Field; Attendance: 210; Umpires: HP: Bill Gannaway, 1B: Tyler Schmidt, 2B: Colin Price, 3B: Jeff Kopecky
Saturday, May 29; 3:00 pm Game 7	HR: Austin McNicholas (5), Kody Kolb (5), Carlos Pineyro (6)	Boxscore	HR: Nick Bottari (22), Carter Bridge (8), Anthony Carrera 2 (14), Austin James (8)	Harris Field; Attendance: 210; Umpires: HP: Bill Gannaway, 1B: Tyler Schmidt, 2B: Colin Price, 3B: Jeff Kopecky

Saturday, May 29; 6:30 pm Game 8	(7) IU–Southeast	5–11	(2) Central Methodist	Harris Field; Attendance: 380; Umpires: HP: Creal Waddell, 1B: Nicholas Katchur, 2B: Daniel Rios, 3B: Scott Jones
Saturday, May 29; 6:30 pm Game 8	LP: Trevor Reynolds (9–2)	Boxscore	WP: Nick Merkel (13–0)	Harris Field; Attendance: 380; Umpires: HP: Creal Waddell, 1B: Nicholas Katchur, 2B: Daniel Rios, 3B: Scott Jones
Saturday, May 29; 6:30 pm Game 8		Boxscore	HR: Kenny Otero (8), Logan Haring (20), Sergio Macias 2 (20)	Harris Field; Attendance: 380; Umpires: HP: Creal Waddell, 1B: Nicholas Katchur, 2B: Daniel Rios, 3B: Scott Jones

Monday, May 31; 8:30 am Game 9	(3) Lewis–Clark State	9–6	(9) LSU–Shreveport	Harris Field; Attendance: 2510; Umpires: HP: Creal Waddell, 1B: Daniel Rios, 2B: Scott Jones, 3B: Tyler Schmidt
Monday, May 31; 8:30 am Game 9	WP: Jesse Parker (3–1); Sv: Greg Blackman (2)	Boxscore	LP: Luisdiego Quintana (4–4)	Harris Field; Attendance: 2510; Umpires: HP: Creal Waddell, 1B: Daniel Rios, 2B: Scott Jones, 3B: Tyler Schmidt
Monday, May 31; 8:30 am Game 9	HR: Jack Johnson (7), Brock Ephan (19), Luke White (11)	Boxscore	HR: Carlos Pineyro (7), Taylor Fajardo (16), Miguel Morgan (7)	Harris Field; Attendance: 2510; Umpires: HP: Creal Waddell, 1B: Daniel Rios, 2B: Scott Jones, 3B: Tyler Schmidt

Monday, May 31; 11:30 am Game 10	(7) IU–Southeast	9–7	(8) Keiser	Harris Field; Umpires: HP: Colin Price, 1B: Nicholas Katchur, 2B: Bill Gannaway, 3B: Jeff Kopecky
Monday, May 31; 11:30 am Game 10	WP: Drew Hensley (9–3); Sv: Jacob Frankel (6)	Boxscore	LP: Deykel Reyes (8–2)	Harris Field; Umpires: HP: Colin Price, 1B: Nicholas Katchur, 2B: Bill Gannaway, 3B: Jeff Kopecky
Monday, May 31; 11:30 am Game 10		Boxscore	HR: Tim Bouchard (17)	Harris Field; Umpires: HP: Colin Price, 1B: Nicholas Katchur, 2B: Bill Gannaway, 3B: Jeff Kopecky

Monday, May 31; 3:00 pm Game 11	(1) Southeastern	7–11	(5) Georgia Gwinnett	Harris Field; Attendance: 175; Umpires: HP: Daniel Rios, 1B: Scott Jones, 2B: Tyler Schmidt, 3B: Creal Waddell
Monday, May 31; 3:00 pm Game 11	LP: Ryan Munoz (11–1)	Boxscore	WP: Adam McKillican (7–3)	Harris Field; Attendance: 175; Umpires: HP: Daniel Rios, 1B: Scott Jones, 2B: Tyler Schmidt, 3B: Creal Waddell
Monday, May 31; 3:00 pm Game 11	HR: Nick Bottari (23)	Boxscore	HR: Griffin Keller (18)	Harris Field; Attendance: 175; Umpires: HP: Daniel Rios, 1B: Scott Jones, 2B: Tyler Schmidt, 3B: Creal Waddell

Monday, May 31; 6:30 pm Game 12	(2) Central Methodist	4–3	(6) Faulkner	Harris Field; Attendance: 390; Umpires: HP: Nicholas Katchur, 1B: Bill Gannaway, 2B: Jeff Kopecky, 3B: Colin Price
Monday, May 31; 6:30 pm Game 12	WP: Mason Schwellenbach (14–1); Sv: Sergio Macias (6)	Boxscore	LP: July Sosa (7–3)	Harris Field; Attendance: 390; Umpires: HP: Nicholas Katchur, 1B: Bill Gannaway, 2B: Jeff Kopecky, 3B: Colin Price
Monday, May 31; 6:30 pm Game 12	HR: Mason Schwellenbach (12)	Boxscore		Harris Field; Attendance: 390; Umpires: HP: Nicholas Katchur, 1B: Bill Gannaway, 2B: Jeff Kopecky, 3B: Colin Price

Tuesday, June 1; 11:00 am Game 13	(1) Southeastern	6–10	(3) Lewis–Clark State	Harris Field; Umpires: HP: Jeff Kopecky, 1B: Scott Jones, 2B: Creal Waddell, 3B: Nicholas Katchur
Tuesday, June 1; 11:00 am Game 13	LP: Jayden Hartle (2–2)	Boxscore	WP: Trent Sellers (8–1)	Harris Field; Umpires: HP: Jeff Kopecky, 1B: Scott Jones, 2B: Creal Waddell, 3B: Nicholas Katchur
Tuesday, June 1; 11:00 am Game 13	HR: Nick Bottari (24), Carter Bridge (9)	Boxscore	HR: Jack Johnson (8)	Harris Field; Umpires: HP: Jeff Kopecky, 1B: Scott Jones, 2B: Creal Waddell, 3B: Nicholas Katchur

Tuesday, June 1; 3:00 pm Game 14	(6) Faulkner	14–10	(7) IU–Southeast	Harris Field; Attendance: 120; Umpires: HP: Tyler Schmidt, 1B: Bill Gannaway, 2B: Creal Waddell, 3B: Colin Price
Tuesday, June 1; 3:00 pm Game 14	WP: Antonio Frias (13–0)	Boxscore	LP: Brenden Bube (4–4)	Harris Field; Attendance: 120; Umpires: HP: Tyler Schmidt, 1B: Bill Gannaway, 2B: Creal Waddell, 3B: Colin Price
Tuesday, June 1; 3:00 pm Game 14	HR: Sam Anthony 2 (6), John Michael Mathews 2 (9)	Boxscore	HR: Clay Woeste (8)	Harris Field; Attendance: 120; Umpires: HP: Tyler Schmidt, 1B: Bill Gannaway, 2B: Creal Waddell, 3B: Colin Price

Tuesday, June 1; 6:30 pm Game 15	(5) Georgia Gwinnett	9–3	(2) Central Methodist	Harris Field; Attendance: 540; Umpires: HP: Scott Jones, 1B: Daniel Rios, 2B: Nicholas Katchur, 3B: Jeff Kopecky
Tuesday, June 1; 6:30 pm Game 15	WP: Tyler Clayton (5–3); Sv: Gage Williams (3)	Boxscore	LP: Kenny Otero (9–3)	Harris Field; Attendance: 540; Umpires: HP: Scott Jones, 1B: Daniel Rios, 2B: Nicholas Katchur, 3B: Jeff Kopecky
Tuesday, June 1; 6:30 pm Game 15	HR: Austin Bates (2), Gabe Howell (10)	Boxscore		Harris Field; Attendance: 540; Umpires: HP: Scott Jones, 1B: Daniel Rios, 2B: Nicholas Katchur, 3B: Jeff Kopecky

==== Championship Bracket ====
Wednesday, June 2; 3:00 pm Game 16	(2) Central Methodist	8–5	(3) Lewis–Clark State	Harris Field; Attendance: 533; Umpires: HP: Bill Gannaway, 1B: Nicholas Katchur, 2B: Jeff Kopecky, 3B: Tyler Schmidt, LF: Colin Price, RF: Creal Waddell
Wednesday, June 2; 3:00 pm Game 16	WP: Nick Merkel (14–0)	Boxscore	LP: Tallon Thomason (7–1)	Harris Field; Attendance: 533; Umpires: HP: Bill Gannaway, 1B: Nicholas Katchur, 2B: Jeff Kopecky, 3B: Tyler Schmidt, LF: Colin Price, RF: Creal Waddell
Wednesday, June 2; 3:00 pm Game 16	HR: Adrian Martinez (9)	Boxscore	HR: Brock Ephan (20)	Harris Field; Attendance: 533; Umpires: HP: Bill Gannaway, 1B: Nicholas Katchur, 2B: Jeff Kopecky, 3B: Tyler Schmidt, LF: Colin Price, RF: Creal Waddell

Wednesday, June 2; 6:30 pm Game 17	(5) Georgia Gwinnett	15–10	(6) Faulkner	Harris Field; Attendance: 185; Umpires: HP: Daniel Rios, 1B: Jeff Kopecky, 2B: Scott Jones, 3B: Creal Waddell, LF: Nicholas Katchur, RF: Colin Price
Wednesday, June 2; 6:30 pm Game 17	WP: Kevin Kyle (9–0)	Boxscore	LP: Tyberius Correa (3–3)	Harris Field; Attendance: 185; Umpires: HP: Daniel Rios, 1B: Jeff Kopecky, 2B: Scott Jones, 3B: Creal Waddell, LF: Nicholas Katchur, RF: Colin Price
Wednesday, June 2; 6:30 pm Game 17	HR: Nick Barnes (16), Myles McKisic (2)	Boxscore	HR: Sam Anthony (7), Shawn Ross 2 (16), Bo Seccombe (3)	Harris Field; Attendance: 185; Umpires: HP: Daniel Rios, 1B: Jeff Kopecky, 2B: Scott Jones, 3B: Creal Waddell, LF: Nicholas Katchur, RF: Colin Price

==== Championship Game ====
Thursday, June 3 6:30 pm PDT at Harris Field Game 18
Team	1	2	3	4	5	6	7	8	9	R	H	E
Central Methodist	0	0	0	0	0	0	0	4	0	4	7	2
Georgia Gwinnett	0	2	1	1	0	4	0	0	X	8	15	3
WP: Hunter Dollander (12–1) LP: Dylan Brister (6–2); Home runs: CMU: None; GGC: J.D. Stubbs (4); Attendance: 1405; Umpires: HP: Jeff Kopecky, 1B: Scott Jones, 2B: Bill Gannaway, 3B: Tyler Schmidt, LF: Daniel Rios, RF: Nicholas Katchur; Boxscore

== See also ==
- 2021 NAIA softball tournament
- 2021 NCAA Division I baseball tournament
- 2021 NCAA Division II baseball tournament
- 2021 NCAA Division III baseball tournament
