= 2019 NAIA baseball tournament =

- Teams: 46
- Finals site: Harris Field; Lewiston, Idaho
- Champions: Tennessee Wesleyan (2nd title)
- Winning coach: Billy Berry
- MVP: Bryce Giles (Tennessee Wesleyan)

The 2019 NAIA baseball tournament was the 63rd edition of the NAIA baseball championship. The 46-team tournament began on May 13 with Opening Round games across nine different sites and concluded with the 2019 NAIA World Series in Lewiston, Idaho that began on May 24 and ended on May 31. Tennessee Wesleyan defeated St. Thomas (FL) 6–2 in a winner-take-all championship game for their second title in program history.

The 46 participating teams were selected from all eligible NAIA teams with the World Series host receiving an automatic bid to the NAIA World Series. The remaining 45 teams participated in the Opening Round with 32 teams being awarded automatic bids as either champions and/or runners-up of their conferences, and 13 teams were selected at-large by the National Selection Committee. Teams were then placed into one of nine pre-determined Opening Round sites of five teams a piece, each of which is conducted via a double-elimination tournament. The winners of each of the Opening Round sites plus the World Series host team participated in the NAIA World Series.

== Tournament procedure ==
A total of 46 teams entered the tournament. As World Series host, Lewis–Clark State received an automatic bid into the NAIA World Series. 32 automatic bids were determined by either winning their conference's regular season championship, conference tournament, and/or conference tournament runner-up. The other 13 bids were at-large, with selections determined by the NAIA Baseball National Selection Committee.

== Opening round hosts ==
On May 1, the NAIA announced the nine opening round host sites, which were played from May 13–16.

Opening Round hosts

Venue(s)	Location(s)	Host(s)
Doyle Buhl Stadium	Williamsburg, KY	University of the Cumberlands
Harrison Field	Montgomery, AL	Faulkner University
Carnes Field	Henderson, TN	Freed–Hardeman University
Grizzly Baseball Complex	Lawrenceville, GA	Georgia Gwinnett College
Pilot Field	Shreveport, LA	Louisiana State University Shreveport
Luther Williams Field	Macon, GA	Middle Georgia State University
Paul Demie Mainieri Field	Miami Gardens, FL	St. Thomas University
Hunter Wright Stadium	Kingsport, TN	Visit Kingsport
Russell Carr Field	Santa Barbara, CA	Westmont College

== Bids ==
=== Automatic ===
School	Conference	Record	Berth	Last NAIA Appearance
Antelope Valley (CA)	Cal Pac/Frontier/Cascade	33–17	Regular season champion	2018 (Lincoln Bracket)
Baker (KS)	Heart	26–25	Tournament champion	First appearance
Bellevue (NE)	North Star	43–14	Tournament champion	2018 (Bowling Green Bracket)
British Columbia	Cal Pac/Frontier/Cascade	29–20	Tournament runner-up	2018 (Lincoln Bracket)
Campbellsville (KY)	Mid-South	31–18	Tournament champion	2018 (Bowling Green Bracket)
Clarke (IA)	Heart	28–21	Tournament runner-up	2018 (Kingsport Bracket)
Concordia (NE)	Great Plains	32–17	Regular season champion	2017 (Hutchinson Bracket)
Columbia (MO)	American Midwest	29–21	Tournament runner-up	First appearance
Faulkner (AL)	Southern States	46–10	Tournament champion	2018 NAIA World Series
Freed–Hardeman (TN)	American Midwest	43–14	Tournament champion	2018 NAIA World Series
Georgia Gwinnett	A.I.I.	43–11	Tournament champion	2018 NAIA World Series
Hope International (CA)	Golden State	29–20	Tournament champion	2017 NAIA World Series
Huntington (IN)	Crossroads	26–14	Regular season champion	2017 (Montgomery Bracket)
Indiana Tech	Wolverine-Hoosier	37–14	Regular season champion	2018 (Montgomery Bracket)
IU–Southeast	River States	35–18	Regular season champion	2018 (Hattiesburg Bracket)
Jamestown (ND)	Great Plains	35–16	Tournament champion	2018 (Oklahoma City Bracket)
Jarvis Christian (TX)	Red River	35–24	Tournament runner-up	First appearance
Lewis-Clark State (ID)	Cal Pac/Frontier/Cascade	34–13	World Series host	2018 NAIA World Series
LSU–Shreveport	Red River	47–11	Regular season champion	2018 (Hattiesburg Bracket)
Madonna (MI)	Wolverine-Hoosier	35–20	Tournament runner-up	2018 (Kingsport Bracket)
Marian (IN)	Crossroads	30–19	Tournament champion	2018 (Williamsburg Bracket)
Mobile (AL)	Southern States	36–20	Tournament runner-up	2018 (Oklahoma City Bracket)
Oklahoma City	Sooner	46–12	Tournament pool champion	2018 NAIA World Series
Oklahoma Wesleyan	Kansas	43–9	Regular season champion	2018 (Upland Bracket)
Olivet Nazarene (IL)	Chicagoland	34–14	Tournament champion	2016 (Lawrenceville Bracket)
Rio Grande (OH)	River States	38–19	Tournament champion	2016 (Kingsport Bracket)
Saint Xavier (IL)	Chicagoland	34–13	Regular season champion	2016 (Grand Rapids Bracket)
Science & Arts (OK)	Sooner	43–10	Tournament pool champion	2018 (Bowling Green Bracket)
Talladega (AL)	A.I.I.	25–24	Tournament runner-up	2018 (Montgomery Bracket)
Tennessee Wesleyan	Appalachian	48–8	Pool A champion	2018 (Kingsport Bracket)
Thomas (GA)	The Sun	28–24	Tournament champion	First appearance
Union (KY)	Appalachian	27–23	Pool B champion	2011 (Kingsport Bracket)
York (NE)	Kansas	29–21	Tournament runner-up	2018 (Oklahoma City Bracket)

=== At–Large ===
School	Conference	Record	Last NAIA Appearance
Arizona Christian	Golden State	38–19	2012 (Azusa Bracket)
Bryan (TN)	Appalachian	36–15	2018 (Williamsburg Bracket)
Central Methodist (MO)	Heart	34–14	2018 (Oklahoma City Bracket)
Cumberlands (KY)	Mid-South	44–8	2018 (Williamsburg Bracket)
Georgetown (KY)	Mid-South	43–13	2014 NAIA World Series
Lyon (AR)	American Midwest	38–20	2018 (Lawrenceville Bracket)
Middle Georgia State	Southern States	39–14	2018 (Lincoln Bracket)
Southeastern (FL)	The Sun	48–10	2018 NAIA World Series
St. Thomas (FL)	The Sun	42–13	2018 (Hattiesburg Bracket)
Texas Wesleyan	Sooner	44–14	2017 (Hattiesburg Bracket)
Webber International (FL)	The Sun	36–20	2018 (Montgomery Bracket)
Westmont (CA)	Golden State	27–18	2018 (Hattiesburg Bracket)
William Jessup (CA)	Golden State	37–12	2018 (Lincoln Bracket)

== Opening Round ==
=== Henderson Bracket ===
Hosted by Freed–Hardeman (TN) at Carnes Field

First round
4	Concordia (NE)	3
5	Clarke (IA)	1
First round
5	Clarke	6
3	Texas Wesleyan	7^{10}

Second round
1	Oklahoma Wesleyan	14
4	Concordia (NE)	6
2	Freed–Hardeman (TN)	3
3	Texas Wesleyan	1
Second round
4	Concordia (NE)	1
3	Texas Wesleyan	2

Semifinals
1	Oklahoma Wesleyan	8
2	Freed–Hardeman	3
Semifinals
2	Freed–Hardeman	5
3	Texas Wesleyan	1

Finals
1	Oklahoma Wesleyan	4	4
2	Freed–Hardeman	7	5

=== Kingsport Bracket ===
Hosted by Visit Kingsport at Hunter Wright Stadium

First round
4	Madonna (MI)	8
5	Marian (IN)	6
First round
5	Marian	8
3	Campbellsville	11

Second round
1	Tennessee Wesleyan	6
4	Madonna	3
2	Webber International (FL)	5
3	Campbellsville (KY)	2
Second round
4	Madonna	5
3	Campbellsville	4

Semifinals
1	Tennessee Wesleyan	0
2	Webber International	1
Semifinals
1	Tennessee Wesleyan	15
4	Madonna	9

Finals
2	Webber International	9	4
1	Tennessee Wesleyan	17	8

=== Lawrenceville Bracket ===
Hosted by Georgia Gwinnett at Grizzly Baseball Complex

First round
4	Saint Xavier (IL)	12
5	Union (KY)	13
First round
4	Saint Xavier (IL)	4
3	IU–Southeast	5

Second round
1	Georgia Gwinnett	5
5	Union (KY)	2
2	Georgetown (KY)	6
3	IU–Southeast	1
Second round
5	Union (KY)	5
3	IU–Southeast	10

Semifinals
1	Georgia Gwinnett	12
2	Georgetown (KY)	2
Semifinals
2	Georgetown (KY)	13
3	IU–Southeast	5

Finals
1	Georgia Gwinnett	2	–
2	Georgetown (KY)	1	–

=== Macon Bracket ===
Hosted by Middle Georgia State at Luther Williams Field

First round
4	Huntington (IN)	5
5	British Columbia	7
First round
4	Huntington	2
2	Middle Georgia State	11

Second round
1	Southeastern (FL)	4
5	British Columbia	1
2	Middle Georgia State	4
3	Rio Grande (OH)	8
Second round
5	British Columbia	0
2	Middle Georgia State	8

Semifinals
1	Southeastern (FL)	7
3	Rio Grande	2
Semifinals
3	Rio Grande	6
2	Middle Georgia State	9

Finals
1	Southeastern (FL)	3	–
2	Middle Georgia State	0	–

=== Miami Gardens Bracket ===
Hosted by St. Thomas (FL) at Paul Demie Mainieri Field

First round
4	Talladega (AL)	3
5	Thomas (GA)	2
First round
5	Thomas	11
3	Bryan	10

Second round
1	St. Thomas (FL)	8
4	Talladega	0
2	William Jessup (CA)	4
3	Bryan (TN)	3
Second round
4	Talladega	0
5	Thomas	11

Semifinals
1	St. Thomas (FL)	7
2	William Jessup	3
Semifinals
2	William Jessup	14
5	Thomas	3

Finals
1	St. Thomas (FL)	7	–
2	William Jessup	5	–

=== Montgomery Bracket ===
Hosted by Faulkner (AL) at Harrison Field

First round
4	Jarvis Christian (TX)	3
5	Olivet Nazarene (IL)	9
First round
4	Jarvis Christian	9
3	Hope International	16

Second round
1	Faulkner (AL)	15
5	Olivet Nazarene	3
2	Central Methodist (MO)	6
3	Hope International (CA)	3
Second round
5	Olivet Nazarene	5
3	Hope International	10

Semifinals
1	Faulkner	10
2	Central Methodist	5
Semifinals
2	Central Methodist	3
3	Hope International	6

Finals
1	Faulkner	16	–
3	Hope International	2	–

=== Santa Barbara Bracket ===
Hosted by Westmont (CA) at Russell Carr Field

First round
4	Arizona Christian	5
5	Jamestown (ND)	4
First round
5	Jamestown	3
2	Westmont	7

Second round
1	Science & Arts (OK)	8
4	Arizona Christian	3
2	Westmont (CA)	8
3	Antelope Valley (CA)	9
Second round
4	Arizona Christian	0
2	Westmont	9

Semifinals
1	Science & Arts	11
3	Antelope Valley	2
Semifinals
3	Antelope Valley	2
2	Westmont	9

Finals
1	Science & Arts	7^{12}	–
2	Westmont	4	–

=== Shreveport Bracket ===
Hosted by LSU–Shreveport at Pilot Field

First round
4	Columbia (MO)	6
5	York (NE)	7
First round
4	Columbia (MO)	15
2	LSU–Shreveport	12

Second round
1	Oklahoma City	7
5	York	12
2	LSU–Shreveport	7
3	Bellevue (NE)	10
Second round
1	Oklahoma City	4
4	Columbia (MO)	5

Semifinals
5	York	1
3	Bellevue	6
Semifinals
5	York	9
4	Columbia (MO)	8

Finals
3	Bellevue	10	–
5	York	4	–

=== Williamsburg Bracket ===
Hosted by Cumberlands (KY) at Doyle Buhl Stadium

First round
4	Mobile (AL)	5^{10}
5	Baker (KS)	4
First round
5	Baker	12
3	Lyon	18

Second round
1	Cumberlands (KY)	10
4	Mobile	1
2	Indiana Tech	8
3	Lyon (AR)	3
Second round
4	Mobile	10
3	Lyon	11^{12}

Semifinals
1	Cumberlands (KY)	5
2	Indiana Tech	10
Semifinals
1	Cumberlands (KY)	16
3	Lyon	13

Finals
2	Indiana Tech	6	–
1	Cumberlands (KY)	4	–

== NAIA World Series ==
The NAIA World Series was held at Harris Field in Lewiston, Idaho.

=== Participants ===
School	Conference	Record	Head Coach	Bracket	Previous NAIA WS Appearances	Best NAIA WS Finish	NAIA WS Record
Bellevue (NE)	North Star	46–14	Duane Monlux	Oklahoma City	13 (last: 2016)	1st (1995)	23–25
Faulkner (AL)	Southern States	49–10	Patrick McCarthy	Montgomery	7 (last: 2018)	1st (2013)	18–12
Freed–Hardeman (TN)	American Midwest	47–15	Jonathan Estes	Henderson	1 (last: 2018)	2nd (2018)	4–2
Georgia Gwinnett	A.I.I.	46–11	Brad Stromdahl	Lawrenceville	2 (last: 2018)	3rd (2018)	3–4
Indiana Tech	Wolverine-Hoosier	41–14	Kip McWilliams	Williamsburg	6 (last: 2003)	2nd (1998)	10–12
Lewis–Clark State (ID)	Cal Pac/Frontier/Cascade	34–13	Jake Taylor	n/a	37 (last: 2018)	1st (1984, 1985, 1987, 1988, 1989, 1990, 1991, 1992, 1996, 1999, 2000, 2002, 2003, 2006, 2007, 2008, 2015, 2016, 2017)	144–48
Science & Arts (OK)	Sooner	46–10	Mike Ross	Santa Barbara	2 (last: 2017)	T-7th (2017)	1–4
Southeastern (FL)	The Sun	51–10	Adrian Dinkel	Macon	1 (last: 2018)	1st (2018)	5–0
St. Thomas (FL)	The Sun	45–13	Jorge Perez	Miami Gardens	6 (last: 2018)	2nd (2015)	7–12
Tennessee Wesleyan	Appalachian	52–9	Billy Berry	Marion	4 (last: 2016)	1st (2012)	7–7

=== Bracket ===
==== Preliminary Bracket ====
First round Friday, May 24
8	Indiana Tech	3^{10}
9	Bellevue	2
7	Freed–Hardeman	5
10	Lewis–Clark State	10
First round Saturday, May 25; Losers eliminated
7	Freed–Hardeman	2
3	Southeastern	10
9	Bellevue	11
4	Faulkner	8

First round Friday, May 24; Second round Saturday, May 25
1	Tennessee Wesleyan	11
8	Indiana Tech	3
4	Faulkner	3
5	Georgia Gwinnett	6
2	Science & Arts	6
10	Lewis–Clark State	2
3	Southeastern	2
6	St. Thomas (FL)	3
Second round Monday, May 27; Losers eliminated
8	Indiana Tech	5
3	Southeastern	6^{10}
10	Lewis–Clark State	2
9	Bellevue	4

Third round Monday, May 27; Winners to Championship Bracket
1	Tennessee Wesleyan	15
5	Georgia Gwinnett	9
2	Science & Arts	5
6	St. Thomas (FL)	6
Third round Tuesday, May 28; Winners to Championship Bracket
2	Science & Arts	8
3	Southeastern	4
5	Georgia Gwinnett	9
9	Bellevue	3

Fourth Round; Tuesday, May 28
1	Tennessee Wesleyan	3
6	St. Thomas (FL)	2

==== Championship Bracket ====
First Round; Wednesday, May 29
1	Tennessee Wesleyan	6
2	Science & Arts	8
5	Georgia Gwinnett	1
6	St. Thomas (FL)	4

Semifinal; Thursday, May 30
2	Science & Arts	2
6	St. Thomas (FL)	10

Final; Friday, May 31
6	St. Thomas (FL)	2
1	Tennessee Wesleyan	6

=== Game Results ===
All game times are listed in Pacific Daylight Time (UTC−07:00).

==== Preliminary Bracket ====
Friday, May 24; 8:30 am Game 1	(9) Bellevue	2–3 (F/10)	(8) Indiana Tech	Harris Field; Attendance: 1103; Umpires: HP: Kelly Loyd, 1B: Mike Thomas, 2B: Scott Jones, 3B: Jeff Kopecky
Friday, May 24; 8:30 am Game 1	LP: Brandon Desjardins (2–3)	Boxscore	WP: Landon Bloir (3–1)	Harris Field; Attendance: 1103; Umpires: HP: Kelly Loyd, 1B: Mike Thomas, 2B: Scott Jones, 3B: Jeff Kopecky

Friday, May 24; 2:45 pm Game 2	(5) Georgia Gwinnett	6–3	(4) Faulkner	Harris Field; Attendance: 960; Umpires: HP: Scott Jones, 1B: Jeff Kopecky, 2B: Kelly Loyd, 3B: Mike Thomas
Friday, May 24; 2:45 pm Game 2	WP: Pedro Garcia (7–1); Sv: Matthew Swain (2)	Boxscore	LP: Evan Gillespie (11–1)	Harris Field; Attendance: 960; Umpires: HP: Scott Jones, 1B: Jeff Kopecky, 2B: Kelly Loyd, 3B: Mike Thomas
Friday, May 24; 2:45 pm Game 2	HR: Brody Wofford (11)	Boxscore	HR: Jacob Freeland (10), Max Guzman (16)	Harris Field; Attendance: 960; Umpires: HP: Scott Jones, 1B: Jeff Kopecky, 2B: Kelly Loyd, 3B: Mike Thomas

Friday, May 24; 7:00 pm Game 3	(6) St. Thomas (FL)	3–2	(3) Southeastern	Harris Field; Umpires: HP: Bill Gannaway, 1B: Andy Joseph, 2B: Dean Holland, 3B: Will Prestwood
Friday, May 24; 7:00 pm Game 3	WP: Orlando Rodriguez (10–2)	Boxscore	LP: Jayden Hartle (7–3)	Harris Field; Umpires: HP: Bill Gannaway, 1B: Andy Joseph, 2B: Dean Holland, 3B: Will Prestwood
Friday, May 24; 7:00 pm Game 3	HR: Jackie Urbaez (8)	Boxscore	HR: Dan Valerio (11)	Harris Field; Umpires: HP: Bill Gannaway, 1B: Andy Joseph, 2B: Dean Holland, 3B: Will Prestwood

Friday, May 24; 10:00 pm Game 4	(10) Lewis–Clark State	10–5	(7) Freed–Hardeman	Harris Field; Attendance: 1970; Umpires: HP: Dean Holland, 1B: Will Prestwood, 2B: Bill Gannaway, 3B: Andy Joseph
Friday, May 24; 10:00 pm Game 4	WP: Tyler Burch (6–3)	Boxscore	LP: Alex Huey (12–2)	Harris Field; Attendance: 1970; Umpires: HP: Dean Holland, 1B: Will Prestwood, 2B: Bill Gannaway, 3B: Andy Joseph
Friday, May 24; 10:00 pm Game 4	HR: Thomas Lampkin Jr. (6), Kyle Callahan 2 (14)	Boxscore	HR: James Michael Dodd (1)	Harris Field; Attendance: 1970; Umpires: HP: Dean Holland, 1B: Will Prestwood, 2B: Bill Gannaway, 3B: Andy Joseph

Saturday, May 25; 8:30 am Game 5	(4) Faulkner	8–11	(9) Bellevue	Harris Field; Attendance: 575; Umpires: HP: Mike Thomas, 1B: Kelly Loyd, 2B: Jeff Kopecky, 3B: Scott Jones
Saturday, May 25; 8:30 am Game 5	LP: Antonio Frias (9–2)	Boxscore	WP: Derek Browne (6–1); Sv: Brandon Desjardins (4)	Harris Field; Attendance: 575; Umpires: HP: Mike Thomas, 1B: Kelly Loyd, 2B: Jeff Kopecky, 3B: Scott Jones
Saturday, May 25; 8:30 am Game 5		Boxscore	HR: Austin Alexander (8)	Harris Field; Attendance: 575; Umpires: HP: Mike Thomas, 1B: Kelly Loyd, 2B: Jeff Kopecky, 3B: Scott Jones

Saturday, May 25; 11:30 am Game 6	(3) Southeastern	10–2	(7) Freed–Hardeman	Harris Field; Attendance: 690; Umpires: HP: Jeff Kopecky, 1B: Scott Jones, 2B: Mike Thomas, 3B: Kelly Loyd
Saturday, May 25; 11:30 am Game 6	WP: Keven Long (10–1)	Boxscore	LP: Tyson Campbell (7–2)	Harris Field; Attendance: 690; Umpires: HP: Jeff Kopecky, 1B: Scott Jones, 2B: Mike Thomas, 3B: Kelly Loyd

Saturday, May 25; 3:00 pm Game 7	(8) Indiana Tech	3–11	(1) Tennessee Wesleyan	Harris Field; Umpires: HP: Will Prestwood, 1B: Bill Gannaway, 2B: Andy Joseph, 3B: Dean Holland
Saturday, May 25; 3:00 pm Game 7	LP: Nate McBroom (6–4)	Boxscore	WP: Cole Bellair (12–2)	Harris Field; Umpires: HP: Will Prestwood, 1B: Bill Gannaway, 2B: Andy Joseph, 3B: Dean Holland
Saturday, May 25; 3:00 pm Game 7	HR: Glen McClain (18)	Boxscore	HR: Bryce Giles (9), Aloysius Cruz 2 (8)	Harris Field; Umpires: HP: Will Prestwood, 1B: Bill Gannaway, 2B: Andy Joseph, 3B: Dean Holland

Saturday, May 25; 7:00 pm Game 8	(10) Lewis–Clark State	2–6	(2) Science & Arts	Harris Field; Attendance: 3230; Umpires: HP: Andy Joseph, 1B: Dean Holland, 2B: Will Prestwood, 3B: Bill Gannaway
Saturday, May 25; 7:00 pm Game 8	LP: Justin Hammergren (3–1)	Boxscore	WP: Colton Williams (16–0)	Harris Field; Attendance: 3230; Umpires: HP: Andy Joseph, 1B: Dean Holland, 2B: Will Prestwood, 3B: Bill Gannaway
Saturday, May 25; 7:00 pm Game 8		Boxscore	HR: Cristian Laboy (10)	Harris Field; Attendance: 3230; Umpires: HP: Andy Joseph, 1B: Dean Holland, 2B: Will Prestwood, 3B: Bill Gannaway

Monday, May 27; 8:30 am Game 9	(9) Bellevue	4–2	(10) Lewis–Clark State	Harris Field; Attendance: 3460; Umpires: HP: Will Prestwood, 1B: Andy Joseph, 2B: Scott Jones, 3B: Dean Holland
Monday, May 27; 8:30 am Game 9	WP: Colton Walker (6–2)	Boxscore	LP: Gerald Hein (4–2)	Harris Field; Attendance: 3460; Umpires: HP: Will Prestwood, 1B: Andy Joseph, 2B: Scott Jones, 3B: Dean Holland
Monday, May 27; 8:30 am Game 9		Boxscore	HR: Kody Garvin (8)	Harris Field; Attendance: 3460; Umpires: HP: Will Prestwood, 1B: Andy Joseph, 2B: Scott Jones, 3B: Dean Holland

Monday, May 27; 11:30 am Game 10	(3) Southeastern	6–5 (F/10)	(8) Indiana Tech	Harris Field; Attendance: 1490; Umpires: HP: Scott Jones, 1B: Dean Holland, 2B: Will Prestwood, 3B: Andy Joseph
Monday, May 27; 11:30 am Game 10	WP: Marc Soto (4–1)	Boxscore	LP: Joe Pratt (0–1)	Harris Field; Attendance: 1490; Umpires: HP: Scott Jones, 1B: Dean Holland, 2B: Will Prestwood, 3B: Andy Joseph
Monday, May 27; 11:30 am Game 10	HR: Abdel Guadalupe (17)	Boxscore		Harris Field; Attendance: 1490; Umpires: HP: Scott Jones, 1B: Dean Holland, 2B: Will Prestwood, 3B: Andy Joseph

Monday, May 27; 3:00 pm Game 11	(1) Tennessee Wesleyan	15–9	(5) Georgia Gwinnett	Harris Field; Attendance: 1370; Umpires: HP: Kelly Loyd, 1B: Jeff Kopecky, 2B: Bill Gannaway, 3B: Mike Thomas
Monday, May 27; 3:00 pm Game 11	WP: Irving Martin (11–2)	Boxscore	LP: Hunter Caudelle (6–1)	Harris Field; Attendance: 1370; Umpires: HP: Kelly Loyd, 1B: Jeff Kopecky, 2B: Bill Gannaway, 3B: Mike Thomas
Monday, May 27; 3:00 pm Game 11	HR: Anthony Williams (9), Shamoy Christopher 2 (9)	Boxscore	HR: Nick Barnes (11)	Harris Field; Attendance: 1370; Umpires: HP: Kelly Loyd, 1B: Jeff Kopecky, 2B: Bill Gannaway, 3B: Mike Thomas

Monday, May 27; 7:00 pm Game 12	(2) Science & Arts	5–6	(6) St. Thomas (FL)	Harris Field; Attendance: 1426; Umpires: HP: Bill Gannaway, 1B: Mike Thomas, 2B: Kelly Loyd, 3B: Jeff Kopecky
Monday, May 27; 7:00 pm Game 12	LP: Matt Merrill (11–2)	Boxscore	WP: Ian Exposito (12–2); Sv: Jason Graña (9)	Harris Field; Attendance: 1426; Umpires: HP: Bill Gannaway, 1B: Mike Thomas, 2B: Kelly Loyd, 3B: Jeff Kopecky
Monday, May 27; 7:00 pm Game 12	HR: Coleton Horner (4), Cristian Laboy (11)	Boxscore	HR: Chris Garabedian (6)	Harris Field; Attendance: 1426; Umpires: HP: Bill Gannaway, 1B: Mike Thomas, 2B: Kelly Loyd, 3B: Jeff Kopecky

Tuesday, May 28; 11:00 am Game 13	(5) Georgia Gwinnett	9–3	(9) Bellevue	Harris Field; Attendance: 470; Umpires: HP: Andy Joseph, 1B: Will Prestwood, 2B: Kelly Loyd, 3B: Scott Jones
Tuesday, May 28; 11:00 am Game 13	WP: Gregory Loukinen (10–3)	Boxscore	LP: Stephen Knapp (10–3)	Harris Field; Attendance: 470; Umpires: HP: Andy Joseph, 1B: Will Prestwood, 2B: Kelly Loyd, 3B: Scott Jones
Tuesday, May 28; 11:00 am Game 13	HR: Nick Barnes (12)	Boxscore		Harris Field; Attendance: 470; Umpires: HP: Andy Joseph, 1B: Will Prestwood, 2B: Kelly Loyd, 3B: Scott Jones

Tuesday, May 28; 3:00 pm Game 14	(2) Science & Arts	8–4	(3) Southeastern	Harris Field; Attendance: 325; Umpires: HP: Mike Thomas/Kelly Loyd, 1B: Scott Jones, 2B: Bill Gannaway, 3B: Dean Holland
Tuesday, May 28; 3:00 pm Game 14	WP: Jean Muntaner (13–1); Sv: Rudy Gonzalez (5)	Boxscore	LP: Jayden Hartle (7–3)	Harris Field; Attendance: 325; Umpires: HP: Mike Thomas/Kelly Loyd, 1B: Scott Jones, 2B: Bill Gannaway, 3B: Dean Holland

Tuesday, May 28; 7:00 pm Game 15	(6) St. Thomas (FL)	2–3	(1) Tennessee Wesleyan	Harris Field; Attendance: 1919; Umpires: HP: Jeff Kopecky, 1B: Bill Gannaway, 2B: Kelly Loyd, 3B: Will Prestwood
Tuesday, May 28; 7:00 pm Game 15	LP: Ernesto Pino (0–2)	Boxscore	WP: Jerry Ochoa (3–0)	Harris Field; Attendance: 1919; Umpires: HP: Jeff Kopecky, 1B: Bill Gannaway, 2B: Kelly Loyd, 3B: Will Prestwood
Tuesday, May 28; 7:00 pm Game 15	HR: Chris Garabedian (7)	Boxscore		Harris Field; Attendance: 1919; Umpires: HP: Jeff Kopecky, 1B: Bill Gannaway, 2B: Kelly Loyd, 3B: Will Prestwood

==== Championship Bracket ====
Wednesday, May 29; 3:00 pm Game 16	(5) Georgia Gwinnett	1–4	(6) St. Thomas (FL)	Harris Field; Attendance: 215; Umpires: HP: Scott Jones, 1B: Andy Joseph, 2B: Jeff Kopecky, 3B: Kelly Loyd, LF: Will Prestwood, RF: Mike Thomas
Wednesday, May 29; 3:00 pm Game 16	LP: Pedro Garcia (7–2)	Boxscore	WP: Orlando Rodriguez (11–2); Sv: Jason Graña (10)	Harris Field; Attendance: 215; Umpires: HP: Scott Jones, 1B: Andy Joseph, 2B: Jeff Kopecky, 3B: Kelly Loyd, LF: Will Prestwood, RF: Mike Thomas
Wednesday, May 29; 3:00 pm Game 16		Boxscore	HR: Alejandro Rivero (15)	Harris Field; Attendance: 215; Umpires: HP: Scott Jones, 1B: Andy Joseph, 2B: Jeff Kopecky, 3B: Kelly Loyd, LF: Will Prestwood, RF: Mike Thomas

Wednesday, May 29; 7:00 pm Game 17	(1) Tennessee Wesleyan	6–8	(2) Science & Arts	Harris Field; Attendance: 1860; Umpires: HP: Bill Gannaway, 1B: Jeff Kopecky, 2B: Andy Joseph, 3B: Dean Holland, LF: Mike Thomas, RF: Will Prestwood
Wednesday, May 29; 7:00 pm Game 17	LP: Gavin Robertson (4–2)	Boxscore	WP: Rudy Gonzalez (6–2); Sv: Ricardo Velez (1)	Harris Field; Attendance: 1860; Umpires: HP: Bill Gannaway, 1B: Jeff Kopecky, 2B: Andy Joseph, 3B: Dean Holland, LF: Mike Thomas, RF: Will Prestwood
Wednesday, May 29; 7:00 pm Game 17		Boxscore	HR: Luis Pelayo (8)	Harris Field; Attendance: 1860; Umpires: HP: Bill Gannaway, 1B: Jeff Kopecky, 2B: Andy Joseph, 3B: Dean Holland, LF: Mike Thomas, RF: Will Prestwood

Thursday, May 30; 8:00 pm Game 18	(6) St. Thomas (FL)	10–2	(2) Science & Arts	Harris Field; Attendance: 1590; Umpires: HP: Will Prestwood, 1B: Scott Jones, 2B: Mike Thomas, 3B: Kelly Loyd, LF: Bill Gannaway, RF: Dean Holland
Thursday, May 30; 8:00 pm Game 18	WP: Christopher Coipel (6–2)	Boxscore	LP: Matt Merrill (11–3)	Harris Field; Attendance: 1590; Umpires: HP: Will Prestwood, 1B: Scott Jones, 2B: Mike Thomas, 3B: Kelly Loyd, LF: Bill Gannaway, RF: Dean Holland
Thursday, May 30; 8:00 pm Game 18	HR: Sergio Lopez (17), Daniel Mondejar (2)	Boxscore	HR: Cristian Laboy (12)	Harris Field; Attendance: 1590; Umpires: HP: Will Prestwood, 1B: Scott Jones, 2B: Mike Thomas, 3B: Kelly Loyd, LF: Bill Gannaway, RF: Dean Holland

==== Championship Game ====
Friday, May 31 7:00 pm PDT at Harris Field Game 19
Team	1	2	3	4	5	6	7	8	9	R	H	E
Tennessee Wesleyan	1	0	1	2	1	1	0	0	0	6	8	1
St. Thomas (FL)	0	0	0	0	1	0	1	0	0	2	6	4
WP: Cole Bellair (13–2) LP: Ian Exposito (12–3); Home runs: TWU: None; STU: Chris Garabedian (8), Joey Thompson (2); Attendance: 2390; Umpires: HP: Mike Thomas, 1B: Will Prestwood, 2B: Andy Joseph, 3B: Jeff Kopecky, LF: Bill Gannaway, RF: Kelly Loyd; Boxscore

== See also ==
- 2019 NAIA softball tournament
- 2019 NCAA Division I baseball tournament
- 2019 NCAA Division II baseball tournament
- 2019 NCAA Division III baseball tournament
