= Jason Ellison =

American baseball player (born 1978)

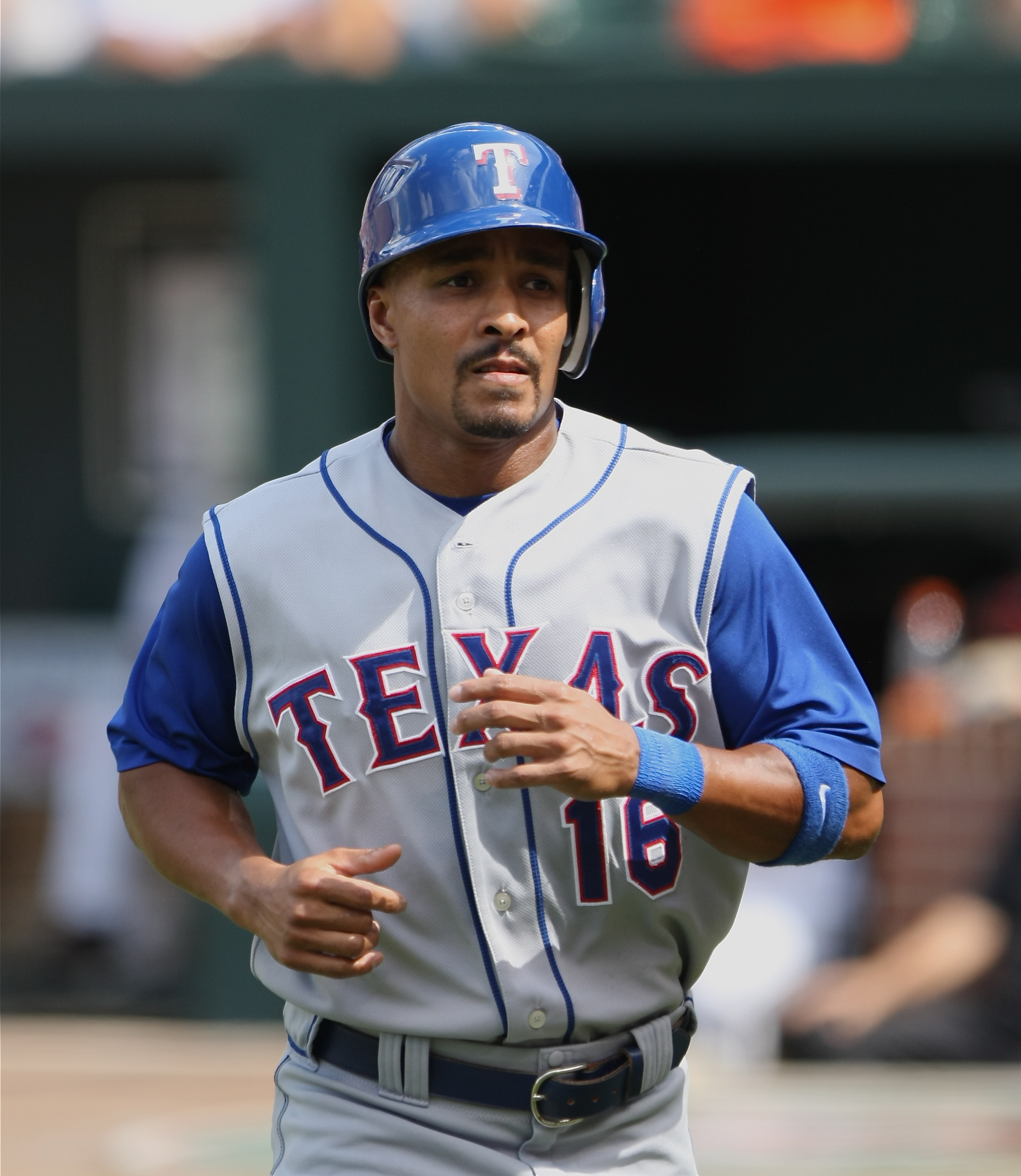
- Ellison with the Texas Rangers
- Outfielder
- Born: April 4, 1978 (age 48); Quincy, California, U.S.
- Batted: Right Threw: Right

MLB debut
- May 9, 2003, for the San Francisco Giants

Last MLB appearance
- August 24, 2008, for the Texas Rangers

MLB statistics
- Batting average: .251
- Home runs: 8
- Runs batted in: 35
- Stats at Baseball Reference

Teams
- San Francisco Giants (2003–2006); Seattle Mariners (2007); Cincinnati Reds (2007); Texas Rangers (2008)

Jason Jerome Ellison (born April 4, 1978) is an American former Major League Baseball outfielder. He attended Lewis-Clark State in Lewiston, Idaho, and made his major league debut on May 9, 2003. He is currently the hitting coach for the Arizona State Sun Devils.

Ellison became one of the more recognizable bench players in the major leagues because he was frequently brought in to pinch run for Barry Bonds. In 2005, Ellison played center field until the trading deadline, when the Giants acquired Randy Winn and Ellison lost his starting job.

== Early life ==
Ellison was born in Quincy, California. He attended South Kitsap High School in Port Orchard, Washington.

== College career ==
In 1997 and 1998, Ellison attended Bellevue Community College in Bellevue, Washington. He then attended Lewis–Clark State College in Lewiston, Idaho. He was an NAIA All-American and two-time national champion, winning the MVP Award at the 1999 NAIA World Series.

== Professional career ==
=== San Francisco Giants ===
Ellison was drafted by the San Francisco Giants in the 22nd round of the 2000 Major League Baseball draft. He began his professional career with rookie-league Salem-Keizer Volcanoes where he led the Northwest League in runs with 67, while ranking third in hits with 90 and tying for seventh with .300 batting average. He led Volcanoes in games with 74 played, at-bats with 300, runs, hits, doubles with 15 and stolen bases with 13. He earned Salem-Keizer's Player of Month honors in his first month in pro ball, snagging the June award.

He spent his second professional campaign with the Class-A Hagerstown Suns in 2001, where he established career highs in runs with 95 and RBIs with 55. Ellison finished among South Atlantic League leaders in doubles, second with 38, runs, second and on-base percentage, third with a .388 clip. His .291 batting average ranked second on Suns, while he paced club with 19 stolen bases. He went 3-for-8 with two home runs and two RBIs in two South Atlantic League post-season games.

In 2002 Ellison split the season between the Class-A San Jose Giants and the Triple-A Fresno Grizzlies, skipping the Double-A level altogether. He combined to hit .286 with 71 runs, 21 doubles, one triple, eight home runs, 48 RBIs and 25 stolen bases in 130 games. His steals total led the Giants minor-league system. Ellison opened the year at San Jose, where he hit .270 with 40 runs, 13 doubles, five home runs, 40 RBIs and nine stolen bases in 81 contests. He earned promotion to Fresno in July and proceeded to hit Pacific Coast League pitching at .311 clip with 31 runs, eight doubles, a triple, and three home runs, eight RBI and 16 stolen bases over 49 contests to close out the 2002 campaign. He was selected Grizzlies' Player of Month for August. Ellison was added to 40-man roster November 21.

Ellison spent the majority of the 2003 season at Fresno, but also made his Major League debut with Giants. He was recalled from Fresno May 9, taking roster spot of disabled outfielder Marvin Benard. He made his big league debut that evening against the Atlanta Braves, entering in the ninth inning as a defensive replacement in left field. He made his first career start on May 11 at Turner Field, going 1-for-5 with his first hit coming in the sixth inning off Trey Hodges. He appeared in seven games for San Francisco, two starts, going 1-for-10 with a run scored. Ellison was optioned to Fresno on May 18, where he remained rest of campaign. Ellison led Grizzlies with 21 stolen bases, while ranking second in games with 119 played and runs with 74. He hit .295 with 22 doubles, four triples, six home runs and 39 RBIs. He earned Fresno Player of Month award for April and was honored by teammates as "Harry Jordan" award winner during spring training, an honor bestowed upon the best first year player in big league camp.

Ellison played in 125 contests for Fresno, boasting a .315 avg. He led Grizzlies in hits with 159, triples with 7 and stolen bases with 27, while ranking second in games with 125 and runs scored with 90 in 2004. He was named Fresno's organizational Player of Month for both June and July. He was tabbed Fresno's Most Inspirational Player. Ellison was called up to San Francisco when rosters were expanded on September 1, marking the second time with big league club. He hit his first Major League home run off the Los Angeles Dodgers Edwin Jackson, a two-run shot on October 3 at Dodger Stadium. Ellison went 2-for-4 with four runs scored, a home run, three RBIs and two stolen bases in 13 contests for the Giants.

In 2005, Ellison emerged as a pleasant surprise for the Giants, earning the majority of club's starts in center field prior to trade-deadline acquisition of Randy Winn and a late-season injury. Despite his limited play in the second half, still ranking among National League rookie leaders in runs with 49, hits with 93, doubles with 18, triples with 2, steals with 14, and outfield assists with 5. He made 82 starts overall, 64 in center field and 18 in right field, hitting .269 with 40 runs, 18 doubles, a triple, three home runs, 23 RBIs, 23 walks and 11 steals. He stole 14 bases, eighth-most ever by a Giants rookie and highest since Marvin Benard swiped 25 in 1996. He was the most productive during early season action, as his average stood above .300 for 66-game stretch from April 8 to June 25. He logged a career-high 8-game hitting streak from May 7 to 14 going 10-for-27, part of stretch in which he hit safely in 15 of 19 games going 23-for-58. Ellison suffered an oblique strain on left side, and appeared in just 17 games after September 1. He logged a brief 10-day stay with Triple-A Fresno, being optioned August 19 when Moisés Alou was activated from disabled list. He returned to the Giants on August 29 following the August 27 trade of Michael Tucker.

The 2006 year was a season of ups and downs for Ellison as he was on the opening-day roster and logged 72 games prior to All-Star Break, but was optioned to Triple-A Fresno before the July 14 second-half opener. He blistered Pacific Coast League pitching to the tune of a .406 average going 78-for-192 with 18 doubles and 18 RBIs in 46 games before being recalled September 1. Ellison appeared in 84 Major League games overall, seeing action at all three outfield positions and as both a pinch-runner and pinch-hitter. He struggled offensively in big leagues, hitting just .222, however he batted .250 as pinch-hitter. He hammered his second career leadoff home run on June 18.

=== Seattle Mariners ===
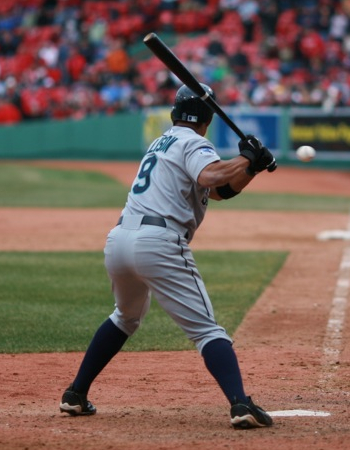
Ellison batting on Opening Day with the 2007 Seattle Mariners.

On April 1, 2007, Ellison was traded to the Seattle Mariners for pitcher Travis Blackley, where he served as a fourth outfielder for the first half of the 2007 season.

Ellison was a key part of an altercation between the Mariners and Oakland Athletics on July 8 that started after A's pitcher Joe Blanton collided with Mariners outfielder Ichiro Suzuki while retrieving a ball that had gotten away from the A's catcher. Ellison responded by charging Blanton, and a bench-clearing scuffle ensued. In spite of this, Ellison was not ejected from the game and had his only four-hit game of his MLB career.

On August 3, the Seattle Mariners designated Ellison for assignment, making room on their 25-man roster for rookie outfielder Adam Jones.

=== Cincinnati Reds ===
On August 7, the Cincinnati Reds claimed Ellison off waivers from the Mariners. He finished the season for the Reds and was outrighted to the minor leagues on October 11. He refused the assignment and elected free agency.

=== Texas Rangers ===
On January 24, 2008, the Texas Rangers signed Ellison to a minor league contract with an invitation to spring training. After spending most of the season in the minors, Ellison was called up on August 7. He was designated for assignment on August 25, and sent outright to the minors two days later.

=== Philadelphia Phillies ===
On January 7, 2009, Ellison signed a minor league contract with an invitation to spring training with the Philadelphia Phillies. He was granted free agency after the season.

== Post-playing career ==
Ellison became a scout in 2011, working as the northwest supervisor for the Los Angeles Angels. He was promoted in 2016 to the team's national hitting crosschecker. He joined the Pittsburgh Pirates as a regional supervisor in 2021.

In 2024, he became the hitting coach and outfield coordinator for the Washington Huskies. In August 2024, he became the hitting coach for the Arizona State Sun Devils, under head coach Willie Bloomquist, his former high school and Mariners teammate.

Ellison was inducted into the Bellevue College Baseball Hall of Fame in 2017 and the college's athletics hall of fame in 2019. Ellison's 1999 baseball team was inducted into Lewis-Clark State College's hall of fame in 2023.

== Personal life ==
Ellison is married and has two children.
