= NAIA World Series =

College baseball tournament

- Sport: Baseball
- Founded: 1957, 69 years ago
- Country: United States
- Venues: Harris Field; Lewiston, Idaho
- Most recent champion: Tennessee Wesleyan
- Most titles: Lewis–Clark State (19)
- Website: naiaworldseries.com

The NAIA World Series (officially branded as the Avista NAIA World Series for sponsorship purposes from 2013) is a double-elimination tournament, held since 1957, to determine the baseball champion of the National Association of Intercollegiate Athletics (NAIA). Since 2000, the tournament has been held at Harris Field on the campus of Lewis–Clark State College (LCSC) in Lewiston, Idaho, having previously hosted from 1984 to 1991.

== History ==
A total of twelve cities have hosted the NAIA World Series. In 1957, the first edition of the series was held in Alpine, Texas, the home of inaugural champions, Sul Ross State. From 1984 to 1991 and since 2000, the series has been held in Lewiston on the campus of LCSC, the winningest school in the competition with 19 victories. The other cities that have hosted the tournament are Sioux City, Iowa; St. Joseph, Missouri; Phoenix, Arizona; Nashville, Tennessee; Lubbock, Texas; Des Moines, Iowa; Tulsa, Oklahoma; and Jupiter, Florida.

As of 2015, a total of 188 schools have competed in the tournament.

== Results ==
NAIA World Series
Year	Host city	Stadium	Championship Results		
Year	Host city	Stadium	Champion	Score	Runner-up
1957; Details	Alpine, Texas	Kokernot Field	Sul Ross State	8–7	Rollins
1958; Details	Alpine, Texas	Kokernot Field	San Diego State	23–9	Southwestern Oklahoma
1959; Details	Alpine, Texas	Kokernot Field	Southern	10–2	Nebraska–Omaha
1960; Details	Sioux City, Iowa	Soos Park	Whitworth	4–0	Georgia Southern
1961; Details	Sioux City, Iowa	Soos Park	East Carolina	13–7	Sacramento State
1962; Details	St. Joseph, Missouri	Phil Welch Stadium	Georgia Southern	2–0	Portland State
1963; Details	St. Joseph, Missouri	Phil Welch Stadium	Sam Houston State	2–1	Grambling State
1964; Details	St. Joseph, Missouri	Phil Welch Stadium	West Liberty State	3–2	Grambling State
1965; Details	St. Joseph, Missouri	Phil Welch Stadium	Carson–Newman	3–2	Nebraska–Omaha
1966; Details	St. Joseph, Missouri	Phil Welch Stadium	Linfield	15–4	Lewis
1967; Details	St. Joseph, Missouri	Phil Welch Stadium	New Mexico Highlands	6–1	Glassboro State
1968; Details	St. Joseph, Missouri	Phil Welch Stadium	William Jewell	4–3^{13}	Georgia Southern
1969; Details	St. Joseph, Missouri	Phil Welch Stadium	William Carey	5–3	La Verne
1970; Details	Phoenix, Arizona	Municipal Stadium	Eastern Michigan	1–0	Northeastern Louisiana
1971; Details	Phoenix, Arizona	Municipal Stadium	Linfield (2)	9–8^{10}	David Lipscomb
1972; Details	Phoenix, Arizona	Municipal Stadium	La Verne	4–1	David Lipscomb
1973; Details	Phoenix, Arizona	Municipal Stadium	United States International	7–2	Eastern Connecticut State
1974; Details	St. Joseph, Missouri	Phil Welch Stadium	Lewis	3–2	Sam Houston State
1975; Details	St. Joseph, Missouri	Phil Welch Stadium	Lewis (2)	2–1	Sam Houston State
1976; Details	St. Joseph, Missouri	Phil Welch Stadium	Lewis (3)	16–8	Lewis–Clark State
1977; Details	St. Joseph, Missouri	Phil Welch Stadium	David Lipscomb	2–1	Southeastern Oklahoma State
1978; Details	St. Joseph, Missouri	Phil Welch Stadium	Emporia State	8–6	Missouri Southern
1979; Details	Nashville, Tennessee	Herschel Greer Stadium	David Lipscomb (2)	5–4	High Point
1980; Details	Nashville, Tennessee	Herschel Greer Stadium	Grand Canyon	5–4^{10}	Lewis
1981; Details	Lubbock, Texas	Chaparral Stadium	Grand Canyon (2)	11–4	Winthrop
1982; Details	Lubbock, Texas	Chaparral Stadium	Grand Canyon (3)	10–6	Lewis–Clark State
1983; Details	Lubbock, Texas	Chaparral Stadium	Lubbock Christian	12–9	Lewis–Clark State
1984; Details	Lewiston, Idaho	Harris Field	Lewis–Clark State	15–2	Azusa Pacific
1985; Details	Lewiston, Idaho	Harris Field	Lewis–Clark State (2)	10–6	Dallas Baptist
1986; Details	Lewiston, Idaho	Harris Field	Grand Canyon (4)	6–5^{10}	Lewis–Clark State
1987; Details	Lewiston, Idaho	Harris Field	Lewis–Clark State (3)	11–4	Emporia State
1988; Details	Lewiston, Idaho	Harris Field	Lewis–Clark State (4)	9–3	Grand Canyon
1989; Details	Lewiston, Idaho	Harris Field	Lewis–Clark State (5)	5–2	St. Francis (IL)
1990; Details	Lewiston, Idaho	Harris Field	Lewis–Clark State (6)	9–4	Auburn Montgomery
1991; Details	Lewiston, Idaho	Harris Field	Lewis–Clark State (7)	7–0	Oral Roberts
1992; Details	Des Moines, Iowa	Sec Taylor Stadium	Lewis–Clark State (8)	14–4	Mary Hardin–Baylor
1993; Details	Des Moines, Iowa	Sec Taylor Stadium	St. Francis (IL)	4–2	Southeastern Oklahoma State
1994; Details	Des Moines, Iowa	Sec Taylor Stadium	Kennesaw State	2–0	Southeastern Oklahoma State
1995; Details	Sioux City, Iowa	Lewis and Clark Park	Bellevue (NE)	8–5	Cumberland (TN)
1996; Details	Sioux City, Iowa	Lewis and Clark Park	Lewis–Clark State (9)	9–0	St. Ambrose
1997; Details	Sioux City, Iowa	Lewis and Clark Park	Brewton–Parker	8–4	Bellevue (NE)
1998; Details	Tulsa, Oklahoma	Drillers Stadium	Albertson	6–3	Indiana Tech
1999; Details	Jupiter, Florida	Roger Dean Stadium	Lewis–Clark State (10)	7–2	Albertson
2000	Lewiston, Idaho	Harris Field	Lewis–Clark State (11)	10–1	Dallas Baptist
2001	Lewiston, Idaho	Harris Field	Birmingham–Southern	8–3	Lewis–Clark State
2002	Lewiston, Idaho	Harris Field	Lewis–Clark State (12)	12–8	Oklahoma City
2003	Lewiston, Idaho	Harris Field	Lewis–Clark State (13)	7–5	Oklahoma City
2004	Lewiston, Idaho	Harris Field	Cumberland (TN)	10–3	Oklahoma City
2005	Lewiston, Idaho	Harris Field	Oklahoma City	8–1	Embry–Riddle (FL)
2006	Lewiston, Idaho	Harris Field	Lewis–Clark State (14)	5–4^{11}	Cumberland (TN)
2007	Lewiston, Idaho	Harris Field	Lewis–Clark State (15)	9–2	Spring Arbor
2008	Lewiston, Idaho	Harris Field	Lewis–Clark State (16)	8–3	Lee (TN)
2009	Lewiston, Idaho	Harris Field	Lubbock Christian (2)	11–8	Point Loma Nazarene
2010	Lewiston, Idaho	Harris Field	Cumberland (TN) (2)	4–3	Lee (TN)
2011; Details	Lewiston, Idaho	Harris Field	Concordia Irvine	9–3	Lubbock Christian
2012; Details	Lewiston, Idaho	Harris Field	Tennessee Wesleyan	10–6	Rogers State
2013; Details	Lewiston, Idaho	Harris Field	Faulkner	11–4	Lewis–Clark State
2014; Details	Lewiston, Idaho	Harris Field	Cumberland (TN) (3)	3–0	Lewis–Clark State
2015; Details	Lewiston, Idaho	Harris Field	Lewis–Clark State (17)	10–7	St. Thomas (FL)
2016; Details	Lewiston, Idaho	Harris Field	Lewis–Clark State (18)	12–11	Faulkner
2017; Details	Lewiston, Idaho	Harris Field	Lewis–Clark State (19)	6–4	Faulkner
2018; Details	Lewiston, Idaho	Harris Field	Southeastern (FL)	6–3	Freed–Hardeman
2019; Details	Lewiston, Idaho	Harris Field	Tennessee Wesleyan (2)	6–2	St. Thomas
2020	Lewiston, Idaho	Harris Field	No World Series held due to the coronavirus pandemic		
2021; Details	Lewiston, Idaho	Harris Field	Georgia Gwinnett	8–4	Central Methodist
2022; Details	Lewiston, Idaho	Harris Field	Southeastern (FL) (2)	11–5	Lewis–Clark State
2023; Details	Lewiston, Idaho	Harris Field	Westmont	7–6	Lewis–Clark State
2024; Details	Lewiston, Idaho	Harris Field	Hope International	14–6	Tennessee Wesleyan
2025; Details	Lewiston, Idaho	Harris Field	LSU–Shreveport	13–7	Southeastern (FL)
2026; Details	Lewiston, Idaho	Harris Field	Tennessee Wesleyan (3)	21–3	Taylor (IN)

== Champions ==
=== Active NAIA programs ===
Team	Titles	Years
Lewis–Clark State	19	1984, 1985, 1987, 1988, 1989, 1990, 1991, 1992, 1996, 1999, 2000, 2002, 2003, 2006, 2007, 2008, 2015, 2016, 2017
Cumberland (TN)	3	2004, 2010, 2014
Tennessee Wesleyan	3	2012, 2019, 2026
Southeastern (FL)	2	2018, 2022
LSU-Shreveport	1	2025
Hope International	1	2024
Georgia Gwinnett	1	2021
Faulkner	1	2013
Oklahoma City	1	2005
College of Idaho	1	1998
Brewton–Parker	1	1997
Bellevue (NE)	1	1995
St. Francis (IL)	1	1993
William Carey	1	1969

=== Former NAIA programs ===
Team	Titles	Years
Grand Canyon	4	1980, 1981, 1982, 1986
Lewis (IL)	3	1974, 1975, 1976
Lubbock Christian	2	1983, 2009
Lipscomb	2	1977, 1979
Linfield	2	1966, 1971
Westmont	1	2023
Concordia Irvine	1	2011
Birmingham–Southern	1	2001
Kennesaw State	1	1994
Emporia State	1	1978
US International	1	1973
La Verne	1	1972
Eastern Michigan	1	1970
William Jewell	1	1968
New Mexico Highlands	1	1967
Carson–Newman	1	1965
West Liberty	1	1964
Sam Houston	1	1963
Georgia Southern	1	1962
East Carolina	1	1961
Whitworth	1	1960
Southern–Baton Rouge	1	1959
San Diego State	1	1958
Sul Ross State	1	1957

== See also ==
- NCAA Division I baseball tournament
- NCAA Division II baseball tournament
- NCAA Division III baseball tournament
- NAIA Softball World Series
