= Gwinnett Chamber of Commerce =

The Gwinnett Chamber of Commerce is a business advocacy organization in Gwinnett County, Georgia.
