= Shawn Ross =

Puerto Rican baseball player (born 1999)

Toronto Blue Jays
- Catcher
- Born: September 30, 1999 (age 27); Santurce, Puerto Rico
- Bats: Right Throws: Right

MLB debut
- July 25, 2026, for the Pittsburgh Pirates

MLB statistics (through 2026 season)
- Batting average: .200
- Home runs: 1
- Runs batted in: 2
- Stats at Baseball Reference

Teams
- Pittsburgh Pirates (2026)

Shawn Michael Ross (born September 30, 1999) is a Puerto Rican professional baseball catcher for the Toronto Blue Jays of Major League Baseball (MLB). He has previously played in MLB for the Pittsburgh Pirates.

== Amateur career ==
Ross played college baseball at Clarendon College and Faulkner University. As a senior at Faulkner, he was named the Southern States Athletic Conference (SSAC) Player of the Year after batting .317 with 18 home runs and 69 RBI.

== Professional career ==
=== Pittsburgh Pirates ===
After going undrafted in the 2022 Major League Baseball draft, Ross signed with the Pittsburgh Pirates as an undrafted free agent on December 1, 2022. He made his professional debut with the High-A Greensboro Grasshoppers in 2023, batting .203 with 14 home runs and 33 RBI. He returned to Greensboro in 2024, recording a .193 batting average with 23 home runs and 58 RBI. He split the 2025 season between the Double-A Altoona Curve and the Triple-A Indianapolis Indians, batting .174 with five home runs and 28 RBI.

Ross began the 2026 season with Altoona. He was later promoted to Indianapolis, and between the two clubs batted .181/.325/.432 with 10 home runs and 25 RBI. On July 24, 2026, the Pirates selected Ross' contract and promoted him to the major leagues for the first time. He made two appearances for Pittsburgh, going 1-for-5 (.200) with one home run and two RBI. Ross was designated for assignment by the team following the acquisition of Johnathan Rodríguez on July 27.

=== New York Mets ===
On August 2, 2026, Ross was claimed off of waivers by the New York Mets. He made 15 appearances for the Triple–A Syracuse Mets, batting .195/.365/.366 with one home run, four RBI, and one stolen base. Ross was designated for assignment by the Mets on September 3.

=== Toronto Blue Jays ===
On September 5, 2026, Ross was claimed off of waivers by the Toronto Blue Jays.
