= Georgia Gwinnett College =

Public college in Lawrenceville, Georgia, US

- Seal of Georgia Gwinnett College
- Former name: Gwinnett University Center (2000–2005)
- Type: Public college
- Established: May 10, 2005; 21 years ago
- Parent institution: University System of Georgia
- President: Jann L. Joseph
- Provost: Chavonda Mills
- Faculty: 408 full-time, 152 part-time (fall 2023)
- Students: 12,245 (fall 2024)
- Location: Lawrenceville, Georgia, U.S. 33°58′52.44″N 84°0′10.22″W
- Campus: Suburban, 250 acres (101.2 ha)
- Colors: Green & Gray
- Nickname: Grizzlies
- Sporting affiliations: NAIA – Continental
- Mascot: "General"
- Website: www.ggc.edu

Georgia Gwinnett College (Georgia Gwinnett or GGC) is a public college in Lawrenceville, Georgia. It is a member of the University System of Georgia. Georgia Gwinnett College opened on August 18, 2006. It has grown from its original 118 students in 2006 to approximately 12,000 students in 2024.

== History ==
=== Beginnings ===
In September 1987, the present day Georgia Gwinnett College used to be part of the then DeKalb College, in which only one building was built at the time, with the name of the building being the University System Center. At the time, the campus was jointly partnered with several other colleges, including University of Georgia and Georgia State University. In addition, the county purchased 160 acres of land located off Georgia 316 and Collins Hill Road in 1994 to solely designate it for the development of a college campus. Five years later, the Georgia Legislature allocated nearly $20 million for the signature building which serves as the focal point on the campus today.

Major site construction began in June 2000 to establish the Gwinnett University Center (GUC). The board of regents approved a public-private venture to construct the first classroom building on the new campus. The new 120,000 square-foot building was constructed in 10 months.

In October 2004, the Georgia Board of Regents voted to create a new four-year college in Gwinnett County. The new college would inhabit the GUC campus and replace the four institutions then offering courses on the site.

The Georgia General Assembly passed legislation calling for the foundation of the college in March 2005. That same year, Gov. Perdue deferred a $5 million appropriation in the 2006 state budget for a 29,000 square-foot classroom building.

Daniel J. Kaufman was the college's first president. A month later, the Board voted to name the institution "Georgia Gwinnett College."

Before the end of the year, the board of regents approved several initial bachelor degree programs: Bachelor of Science with a major in biology, a Bachelor of Science with a major in psychology, a Bachelor of Science in education with a major in early childhood education (including eligibility for certification in special education), a Bachelor of Applied Science with a major in technology management, a Bachelor of Business Administration with a major in general business, a Bachelor of Science in radiologic technology, and a Bachelor of Science in nursing.

When Georgia Gwinnett College opened on August 18, 2006, it got dissociated from Georgia Perimeter College, to officially be formed as part of the USG. The college accepted 118 juniors as its first students. The following fall, GGC admitted its first freshman class. In 2008, the college held its inaugural commencement ceremony, graduating 17 students.

Georgia Gwinnett received accreditation from the Commission on Colleges of the Southern Association of Colleges and Schools in June 2009. GGC began offering majors in History, Exercise Science, Mathematics, Special Education, English, Political Science and Criminal Justice/Criminology.

=== Expansion and growth ===
GGC opened a new Library and Learning Center as well as its first residence halls in 2010. The school had 5,300 students that fall. The GGC Student Center opened in January 2011 and a new laboratory building in August 2011. Enrollment reached 9,400 in the fall of 2012.

In early 2013, the college broke ground on its Allied Health and Sciences Building, future home of the School of Science and Technology and the School of Health Sciences and its nursing program, which began in the fall 2014 semester.

The Grizzlies began intercollegiate competition in the National Association of Intercollegiate Athletics in the 2012–2013 academic year.

On March 22, 2013, GGC President Daniel J. Kaufman was named as the new president of the Gwinnett Chamber of Commerce. Kaufman, who had been president of GGC since the institution's founding in 2005, stepped down from his role on June 30, 2013. University System of Georgia Chancellor Hank Huckaby announced that he had appointed Stanley "Stas" Preczewski, then-vice president for academic and student affairs at GGC, to serve as interim president. In May 2014, Chancellor Hank Huckaby announced that the board of regents approved his recommendation to name Preczewski president of Georgia Gwinnett College.

For many years, GGC had controversial free speech zones. In July 2016, a college official stopped a student from distributing leaflets about his religious faith in an outdoor plaza. The student, Chike Uzuegbunam, was told he could only engage in this sort of activity by getting permission three days in advance and only at one of the two free speech zones on campus. After getting permission, Uzuegbunam was then told by campus police that he could not speak in the free speech zone because "someone complained". Uzuegbunam subsequently sued the college for violating his First Amendment rights. GGC subsequently changed its campus speech policy to make speech easier on campus and in 2018 a federal district court judge dismissed the case based on the change in policy. That ruling was upheld on appeal in 2019 but the student appealed to the US Supreme Court. The court ruled in his favor but the college had already changed its free-speech policy.

Preczewski announced his retirement on January 10, 2019, effective the following day. Mary Beth Walker served as interim president with Jann Luciana Joseph becoming the college's permanent president on July 1, 2019.

As of Fall 2025, the college enrolls more than 12,000 students.

== Campus ==
The current campus consists of buildings A, B, C, H, and W which are used for classes and activities. There are also a Wellness Center (Building F), Administration building (Building D), Athletics Complex (Building G), Student Center (Building E), the Counseling and Psychological Services (CAPS) Building (Building I), the Daniel J. Kaufman Library & Learning Center, and several student residence buildings.

In April 2023, GGC broke ground on a new 72,280 square-foot Convocation Center as part of a $48 million state-funded capital project. The center was completed in late 2024.

== Organization ==
The college administration includes a president and cabinet, and schools as follow.

- School of Business
- School of Education
- School of Health Sciences
- School of Liberal Arts
- School of Science and Technology

== Academics ==
GGC is accredited by the Southern Association of Colleges and Schools (SACS) and has been so since June 25, 2009. In 2018, the college's business school earned Association to Advance Collegiate Schools of Business (AACSB) accreditation.

The college is classified as a Baccalaureate college.

GGC offers over 60+ programs of study including 21 majors, 22 minors, and 7 certificates. The college offers the following degrees:

- Bachelor of Arts
- Bachelor of Business Administration
- Bachelor of Integrative Studies (Note: The Integrative Studies degree requires students to complete three 18-credit hour major concentrations or two concentrations and one minor, certificate or certification. The degree allows a student to design a major that aligns with workforce demands and emerging fields of study while developing an understanding of the connections among disciplines.)
- Bachelor of Science
- Nexus Degree (Note: A Nexus Degree is a unique academic credential, created by the University System of Georgia, that prepares students for in-demand careers through a blend of traditional classroom learning and experiential learning. A Nexus Degree requires fewer credit hours than a four-year degree – much like an associate degree – but includes some of the beneficial attributes of experiential learning and upper-division coursework typical of bachelor’s degrees. Nexus Degree credits can be used toward a four-year bachelor’s degree in a related program of study.)

There are teacher certification tracks in some programs for students interested in teaching at the secondary level.

=== Faculty ===
The student-to-faculty ratio for the college was 20:1 as of the 2022–2023 academic year. Faculty at Georgia Gwinnett College are not eligible for tenure, but are instead hired through renewable one- to five-year contracts.

=== Admissions ===
Georgia Gwinnett has an open admission policy, admitting all applicants with few admission thresholds so long as certain minimum requirements are met. In the fall 2023, 96% of applicants were admitted and 44% of admitted students enrolled in the college. For 2024, GGC's enrolled students had an average 2.88 high school GPA. The college does not consider standardized test scores, the college having a test blind policy. Those enrolled students that had obtained test scores had an average 1060 SAT score (14% having scores) or an average 20 ACT score (4% having scores).

=== Rankings ===
Academic rankings

Regional
- U.S. News & World Report: 56

In 2025, U.S. News & World Report ranked GGC No. 56 out of 131 Regional Colleges South, No. 20 out of 27 in Top Public Schools in Regional Colleges South, tied at No.314 out of 686 in Best Bachelor of Science in Nursing (BSN) Programs, and tied at No.54 out of 97 in Top Performers on Social Mobility in Regional Colleges South.

=== Institutional information ===
At GGC, students have technology in all classrooms, free tutoring, an Honors Program, certifications and certificate options in addition to degrees, faculty-mentored research available, academic internships available, and student organizations that provide practical application of classroom instruction. Georgia Gwinnett had a 2022 retention rate of first–time students of 69% for full–time students and 53% for part–time students and, for those who began studies in 2017, an overall graduation rate of 20% and transfer–out rate of 37%, this information available in 2025 by the National Center for Education Statistics.

== Student life ==
Undergraduate demographics as of Fall 2023
Race and ethnicity	Total
Black	32%
Hispanic	28%
White	21%
Asian	11%
Two or more races	4%
International student	3%
Unknown	1%
Economic diversity
Low-income (Note: The percentage of students who received an income-based federal Pell grant intended for low-income students.)	54%
Affluent (Note: The percentage of students who are a part of the American middle class at the bare minimum.)	46%

GGC has a population of about 12,000 students, with campus housing for more than 1,000. There are more than 100 student organizations and a student government association. There are 17 national honor society chapters on campus. The campus has a 24/7 police and security force, and employs around 30 "Student Patrols" (who provide services that range from collecting lost and found to locking up buildings and providing courtesy escorts). The college is located near downtown Lawrenceville and students have access to Atlanta and the Georgia mountains. In 2024, U.S. News & World Report ranked GGC as having the fourth most diverse college student body with student demographics of 32% Black, 27% Hispanic, 23% white, 11% Asian, and 4% multiracial. As of fall 2024, the college enrolled students representing 33 states and 113 nations.

== Athletics ==
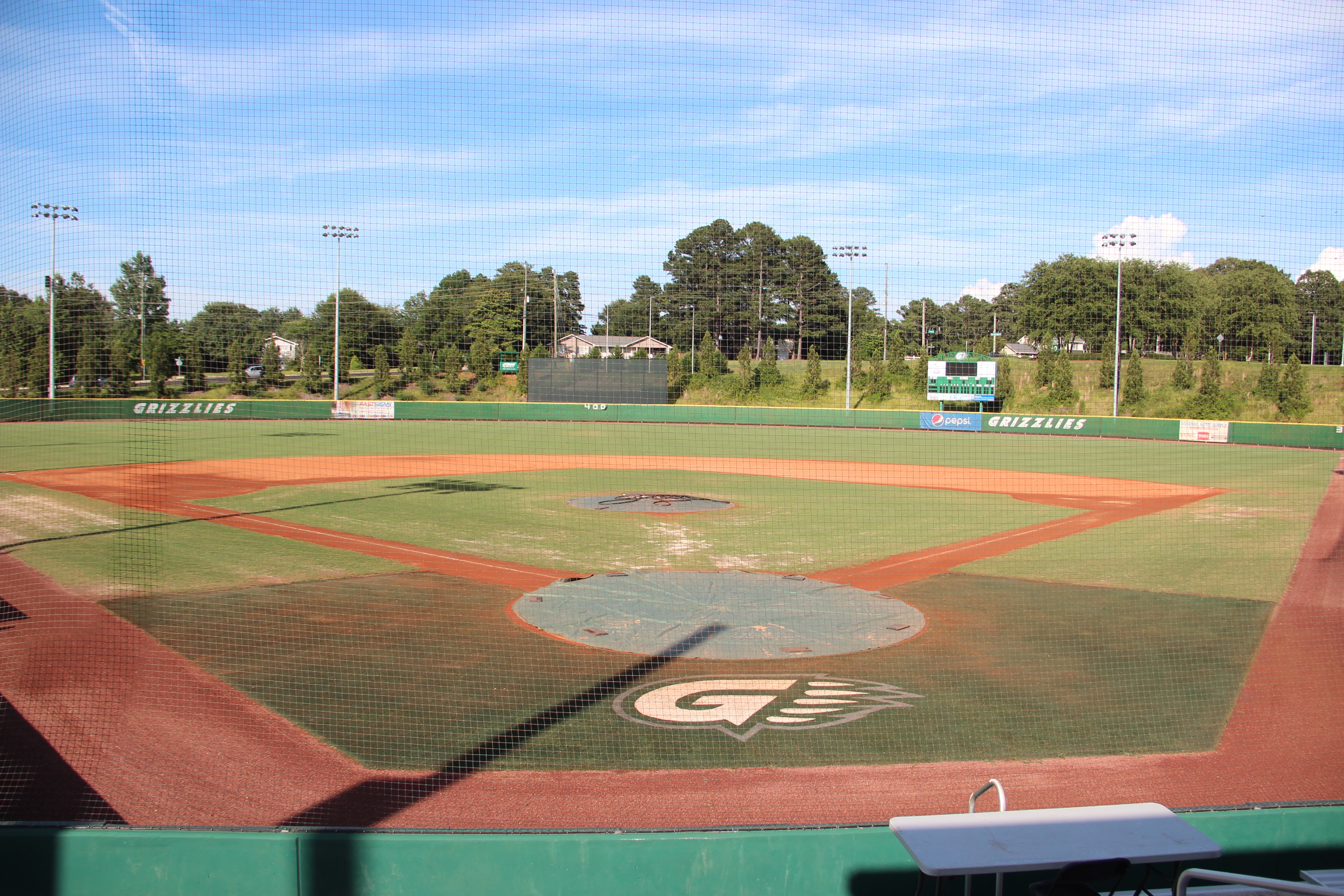
Grizzly Baseball Field

The Georgia Gwinnett athletic teams are called the Grizzlies. The college is a member of the National Association of Intercollegiate Athletics (NAIA), primarily competing as an NAIA Independent within the Continental Athletic Conference since the 2012–13 academic year (when the school began its athletics program and joined the NAIA).

Georgia Gwinnett competes in six intercollegiate varsity sports: men's sports include baseball, basketball, soccer and tennis; while women's sports include basketball, soccer, softball and tennis.

=== Facilities ===
The $13 million Grizzly Athletic Complex opened in March 2013 and includes soccer, baseball and softball fields and an athletics building for team lockers, weight room, training areas, hospitality suites, academic resource space, coaches and athletic staff offices.

In July, 2013, the college acquired the former Collins Hill Tennis & Fitness Center which included 4 clay tennis courts and 12 asphalt tennis courts.

=== Accomplishments ===
The intercollegiate athletics program began in August 2011 when the director of athletics was hired. The program progressed, as follows.

- The athletic complex was approved by the board of regents in September 2011
- GGC athletics were accepted into NAIA in April 2012
- The athletics web site was launched in May 2012
- The athletic complex opened on March 9, 2013
- Teams began competing in 2012–2013, depending on the sport.

As of July 2019, the GGC Athletic programs have won 11 national championships, achieved over 1,000 victories, and won more than 77 percent of their games during the seven seasons. In 2018, the Grizzlies advanced to the finals in all six NAIA national championship tournaments, and won men's and women's tennis national titles. GGC is a recipient of the NAIA Champions of Character team award. Several student-athletes have been recognized as All-Americans, Academic All-Americans by the College Sports Communicators organization, as Daktronics NAIA Scholar-Athletes, along with being named to the GGC's President's List and GGC Director of Athletics' Honor Roll for achieving a 3.0 GPA or higher. Tennis coach Chase Hodges was recognized as ITA NAIA Men's Tennis National Coach of the Year five times, and the men's soccer coaching staff was named Region's NAIA Staff of the Year in 2018.

== Notable alumni ==
- David Clark — Georgia State Representative (attended)
- Jordan Cox – professional tennis player
- Druski — American comedian, actor, and influencer (transferred to Georgia Southern University)
- Jack Gurr — English footballer
- Dhakshineswar Suresh – professional tennis player
- Ayed Zatar — professional tennis player
