= Tennessee Wesleyan Bulldogs =

- University: Tennessee Wesleyan University
- Nickname: Bulldogs
- Association: NAIA
- Conference: AAC (primary)
- Athletic director: Donny Mayfield
- Location: Athens, Tennessee
- Varsity teams: 21 (9 men's, 10 women's, 2 co-ed)
- Basketball arena: James L. Robb Gymnasium
- Baseball stadium: Jack Bowling Field at Athens Insurance Stadium
- Soccer stadium: TWU Athletic Complex
- Lacrosse stadium: TWU Athletic Complex
- Colors: Royal blue and white
- Website: twbulldogs.com/landing/index

The Tennessee Wesleyan Bulldogs are the athletic teams that represent Tennessee Wesleyan University, located in Athens, Tennessee, in intercollegiate sports as a member of the National Association of Intercollegiate Athletics (NAIA), primarily competing in the Appalachian Athletic Conference (AAC) since the 2001–02 academic year. The Bulldogs were at once point in the now-defunct Smoky Mountain Conference, having joined in 1956.

== Varsity teams ==
Tennessee Wesleyan competes in 22 intercollegiate varsity sports:

Men's sports	Women's sports
Baseball	Basketball
Basketball	Bowling
Bowling	Cross country
Cross country	Golf
Golf	Lacrosse
Lacrosse	Soccer
Soccer	Softball
Tennis	Tennis
Track and field	Track and field
	Volleyball
Co-ed sports
Bass fishing

=== Baseball ===
The Bulldogs have had a successful history in baseball, having won the NAIA World Series 2 times (2012, 2019) as well as 24 conference championships and 12 conference tournament championships.

== Notable people ==
- Nick Akoto, soccer player
- Tom Browning, baseball player
- Ron Campbell, baseball player
- Chris Cattaneo, soccer player

== National championships ==
=== Team ===
Sport	Titles	Assoc.	Division	Year	Runner-up	Score
Baseball	3	NAIA	Single	2012	Rogers State	10–6
Baseball	3	NAIA	Single	2019	St. Thomas (FL)	6–2
Baseball	3	NAIA	Single	2026	Taylor University	21-3
