= Southeastern Fire =

Education

Coordinates: 28.0286214°N 81.9173312°W

- University: Southeastern University
- Nickname: Fire
- Association: NAIA
- Conference: The Sun (primary); Mid-South (wrestling)
- Athletic director: Drew Watson
- Location: Lakeland, Florida
- Varsity teams: 19 (10 men's, 8 women's, 1 co-ed)
- Football stadium: Victory Field
- Basketball arena: The Furnace
- Baseball stadium: Ted A. Broer Stadium
- Softball stadium: SEU Softball Complex
- Soccer stadium: SEU Soccer Field
- Tennis venue: Beerman Family Tennis Complex
- Colors: Black and red
- Mascot: Scorch
- Website: fire.seu.edu/index.aspx

The Southeastern Fire are the athletic teams that represents Southeastern University, located in Lakeland, Florida, in intercollegiate sports as a member of the National Association of Intercollegiate Athletics (NAIA), primarily competing in the Sun Conference (formerly known as the Florida Sun Conference (FSC) until after the 2007–08 school year) since the 2009–10 academic year. The Fire previously competed as a member of the National Christian College Athletic Association (NCCAA), primarily competing as an independent in the South Region of both the Division II and Division I levels. The Fire previously competed as an NAIA Independent within the Association of Independent Institutions (AII) during the 2008–09 school year.

== Overview ==
In the spring of 2016, the Fire joined the Mid-South Conference for football. Southeastern University has won NCCAA Division II championships in all four men's sports and an NCCAA Division I championship in men's golf. In 2014, Senior Dwayne Johnson was named an NAIA All-American after leading the fire to the final four of the NAIA Division II basketball championship in Point Lookout, Missouri, while Junior Timothy Mitchell was named to the second team. Johnson signed a professional contract with the Liepajas Lauvas of Latvia, while senior Mitchell Wiggins Jr was one of seven players drafted by the Harlem Globetrotters. The university added women's softball, men's tennis, and men's & women's cross country in 2012. Southeastern currently competes in seven men's and seven women's sports, after the addition of football in the 2014–15 academic year. The addition of men's wrestling, the first collegiate program in the state, is planned for the 2015–16 academic year.

The team mascot was Maniac until 2014, when a new mascot, Scorch, was introduced along with the unveiling of the new football stadium.

== Varsity teams ==
Southeastern competes in 19 intercollegiate varsity sports:

Men's sports	Women's sports
Baseball	Basketball
Basketball	Cross country
Bass fishing	Golf
Cross country	Soccer
Football	Softball
Golf	Tennis
Soccer	Track and field
Tennis	Volleyball
Track and field	
Wrestling	
Co-ed sports
eSports

=== Baseball ===
In 2018, the baseball team, coached by Adrian Dinkel, had a 50-5 regular season record, and was ranked fourth in the NAIA. After an early exit from The Sun Conference tournament, they swept the Kingsport Opening Round bracket. They then swept five games in the NAIA World Series in Lewiston, ID, winning the national championship in their first trip to the tournament. OF Manuel Mesa won the tournament Most Valuable Player and Charles Berry Hustle awards. They also won the title in 2022.

=== Men's basketball ===
In 2014, the men's basketball team reached the final four of the 2014 NAIA Division II men's basketball tournament, in which they defeated top seeded Cardinal Stritch behind a perfect shooting night from Jake Hodges. Point guard Dwayne Johnson was named to the all-America team. Center Timothy Mitchell was named to the all-tournament team, while reserve Mitchell Wiggins Jr. was selected to participate in the NAIA dunk contest and was drafted by the Harlem Globetrotters.

In 2018, the team qualified for the national tournament by winning The Sun Conference tournament, defeating Keiser University 87-80 in overtime.

=== Women's basketball ===
In 2017, the Fire went undefeated in the regular season. After winning 28 straight games, the Sun Conference regular season championship, and the Sun Conference tournament championship, they continued to the NAIA national tournament. They earned the first Sun Conference women's basketball first ever playoff victory, and went to the final four. Senior Bailey Hooker was named first-team All-American, and senior Christin Strawbridge was named second-team All-American.

In 2018, the team stretched their regular-season winning streak to 58 straight games and achieved the school's first ever NAIA #1 ranking in any sport. They completed the 2018 regular season undefeated and won the conference tournament for the third straight year, earning the overall top seed in the national tournament.

=== Football ===
In 2015, in their second season, the football team won the Sun Conference Championship retroactively after Edward Waters was forced to forfeit a game. In 2016, the team was able to represent the conference in the NAIA national championship tournament after completing the season with an undefeated conference record. Running back Jarrell Reynolds was named the conference player of the year.

In 2017, the football team won the Mid-South Conference Sun Division title and the opportunity to play in the postseason.

=== Men's golf ===
In 2007, the men's golf team won the NCCAA National Championship.

=== Men's soccer ===
In 2006, the men's soccer team won the NCCAA DII National Championship and coach Drew Stacey was named NCCAA coach of the year. In 2015, the men's soccer team won The Sun Conference championship. Freshman Jake van der Luit was named the tournament MVP.

== National championships ==
Sport	Titles	Assoc.	Competition	Year	Rival	Score	Ref.
Baseball	2	NAIA	World Series	2018	Freed–Hardeman	6–3	
Baseball	2	NAIA	World Series	2022	Lewis–Clark State	11–5	
Track and field (men's)	1	NAIA	National championship	2023	Life	45–40	

== Professional players ==
Several Fire players have continued their athletic careers professionally, including MLB Second baseman Dee Gordon and Outfielder Marvin Malone.

Many basketball players have gone on to play professionally, including Ali Hosni (2013), Jacob Blankenship (2012), Povilas Gaidys (2012), Amir Royal (2013), Malcolm Pollock (2013), Dwayne Johnson (2014), and Tim Mitchell (2015)

Justin Michel plays soccer for the Bonaire national football team. Gerritson Craane has played for the Curaçao national football team. Aisha Solórzano played for the Guatemala women's national football team.
