= 1999 NAIA World Series =

1999 NAIA baseball tournament
- 1999 NAIA World Series
- Teams: 10
- Format: Double elimination Page playoff
- Finals site: Roger Dean Stadium; Jupiter, Florida
- Champions: Lewis–Clark State (10th title)
- Winning coach: Ed Cheff
- MVP: Jason Ellison (OF) (Lewis–Clark State)

The 1999 NAIA World Series was the 43rd annual tournament hosted by the National Association of Intercollegiate Athletics to determine the national champion of baseball among its member colleges and universities in the United States and Canada.

The tournament was played, for the one and only time, at Roger Dean Stadium in Jupiter, Florida.

Lewis–Clark State (57–14) defeated defending champions Albertson (50–19) in the second game of a two-game championship series, 7–2, to win the Warriors' tenth NAIA World Series and first since 1996.

Lewis–Clark State outfielder, and future major leaguer, Jason Ellison was named tournament MVP.

== Bracket ==
=== Preliminary bracket ===
First round Losers to Consolation Bracket; Second Round
Albertson | 9
Indiana Tech | 8
Culver–Stockton | 7
Dominican (NY) | 1
Second Round; Losers eliminated
Dominican | 8
Dallas Baptist | 17
Indiana Tech | 9
Embry–Riddle | 8

Second round Losers to Consolation Bracket; Second or Third Round
Oklahoma City | 2
Albertson | 9
Birmingham–Southern | 7
Embry–Riddle | 3
Lewis–Clark State | 14
Culver–Stockton | 0
Bellevue (NE) | 12
Dallas Baptist | 10
Third Round; Losers eliminated
Oklahoma City | 14
Dallas Baptist | 3
Culver–Stockton | 6
Indiana Tech | 5

Third round Losers to Consolation Bracket; Fourth Round
Albertson | 7
Birmingham–Southern | 5
Lewis–Clark State | 9
Bellevue | 4
Fourth Round; Losers eliminated, Winners to Semifinals
Birmingham–Southern | 8
Oklahoma City | 6
Bellevue | 3
Culver–Stockton | 7

Fourth round Both teams to Championship Bracket; Semifinals
Albertson | 3
Lewis–Clark State | 7

=== Championship bracket ===
Semifinals
Lewis–Clark State | 3
Birmingham–Southern | 0
Albertson | 7
Culver–Stockton | 2

Championship
Lewis–Clark State | 1 | 7
Albertson | 2 | 2

== See also ==
- 1999 NCAA Division I baseball tournament
- 1999 NCAA Division II baseball tournament
- 1999 NCAA Division III baseball tournament
- 1999 NAIA Softball World Series
