= 2024 NAIA baseball tournament =

- Teams: 46
- Finals site: Harris Field; Lewiston, Idaho
- Champions: Hope International (CA) (1st title)
- Winning coach: Larry Mahoney
- MVP: JJ Cruz (Hope International)

The 2024 NAIA baseball tournament was the 67th edition of the NAIA baseball championship. The 46-team tournament began on May 13 with Opening Round games across ten different sites and concluded with the 2024 NAIA World Series in Lewiston, Idaho that began on May 24 and ended on May 31.

After losing their first game of the World Series, Hope International (CA) rattled off five straight victories capped off by defeating Tennessee Wesleyan 14–6 in the championship game for their first title in program history.

The 46 participating teams were selected from 191 eligible NAIA teams. The World Series host and 29 teams were awarded automatic bids as either champions and/or runners-up of their conferences, and 16 teams were selected at-large by the National Selection Committee. Teams were then placed into one of ten pre-determined Opening Round sites, with six sites consisting of five teams and four sites consisting of four teams, each of which is conducted via a double-elimination tournament. The winners of each of the Opening Round sites participated in the NAIA World Series.

== Tournament procedure ==
A total of 46 teams entered the tournament, with Lewis–Clark State receiving an automatic bid into the Opening Round as World Series host. 29 automatic bids were determined by either winning their conference's regular season championship, conference tournament, and/or conference tournament runner-up. The other 16 bids were at-large, with selections determined by the NAIA Baseball National Selection Committee.

== Opening round hosts ==
On May 1, the NAIA announced the ten opening round host sites, which were played from May 13–16.

Opening Round hosts

Venue	Location	Host
Estes Baseball Field	Fayette, MO	Central Methodist University
Doyle Buhl Stadium	Williamsburg, KY	University of the Cumberlands
Sherman Field	Lincoln, NE	Doane University
Grizzly Baseball Complex	Lawrenceville, GA	Georgia Gwinnett College
Harris Field	Lewiston, ID	Lewis-Clark State College
Pilot Field (Note: After Game 1 of the Shreveport bracket on May 13 was suspended due to rain in the 7th inning, Pilot Field was deemed unplayable. Thus, the completion of the suspended game plus all scheduled games on May 14 and 15 were played at Bossier Parish Community College. The tournament returned to Pilot Field for the championship game on May 16.); BPCC Baseball Field	Shreveport, LA; Bossier City, LA	Louisiana State University Shreveport
Ken White Baseball Field	Waleska, GA	Reinhardt University
Winterholter Field	Upland, IN	Taylor University
Hunter Wright Stadium	Kingsport, TN	Visit Kingsport
Milton Wheeler Field	Hattiesburg, MS	William Carey University

== Bids ==
=== Automatic ===
School	Conference	Record	Berth	Last NAIA Appearance
Bellevue (NE)	North Star	39–12	Tournament champion	2023 NAIA World Series
Blue Mountain Christian (MS)	Southern States	31–21	Tournament runner-up	First Appearance
Bushnell (OR)	Cascade	29–24	Tournament champion	First Appearance
Concordia (NE)	Great Plains	41–13	Regular season champion	2023 (Lawrenceville Bracket)
Cumberlands (KY)	Mid-South	48–6	Tournament champion	2023 NAIA World Series
Doane (NE)	Great Plains	38–13	Tournament runner-up	2023 (Bellevue Bracket)
Embry–Riddle (AZ)	Cal Pac	29–18	Tournament champion	First Appearance
Georgia Gwinnett	Continental	47–6	Tournament champion	2023 NAIA World Series
Indiana Tech	Wolverine-Hoosier	32–22	Tournament champion	2021 (Marion Bracket)
IU–Southeast	River States	32–18	Tournament runner-up	2022 (Santa Barbara Bracket)
Jessup (CA)	Golden State	39–9	Tournament champion	2019 (Miami Gardens Bracket)
Kansas Wesleyan	Kansas	45–10	Regular season champion	2023 (Fayette Bracket)
Lewis-Clark State (ID)	Cascade	37–11	World Series host	2023 NAIA World Series
Louisiana Christian	Red River	32–19	Tournament champion	1987 (Area II Tournament)
LSU–Shreveport	Red River	42–9	Regular season champion	2023 (Shreveport Bracket)
Mid-America Christian (OK)	Sooner	40–11	Tournament champion	First Appearance
Missouri Baptist	American Midwest	39–10-1	Tournament champion	2023 (Kingsport Bracket)
Mount Mercy (IA)	Heart	32–20	Tournament champion	First Appearance
Northwestern Ohio	Wolverine-Hoosier	36–15	Regular season champion	2022 (Upland Bracket)
Oklahoma Wesleyan	Kansas	35–18	Tournament champion	2021 NAIA World Series
Park (MO)	Heart	35–17	Tournament runner-up	First appearance
Point Park (PA)	River States	41–13	Tournament champion	2023 (Upland Bracket)
Reinhardt (GA)	Appalachian	38–16	Tournament runner-up	2023 (Williamsburg Bracket)
Saint Francis (IN)	Crossroads	37–17	Tournament runner-up	First Appearance
Southeastern (FL)	The Sun	48–6	Tournament champion	2023 NAIA World Series
St. Francis (IL)	Chicagoland	29–19	Tournament champion	2023 (Fayette Bracket)
Talladega (AL)	Gulf Coast	36–15	Tournament champion	2019 (Miami Gardens Bracket)
Taylor (IN)	Crossroads	41–14	Regular season champion	2023 NAIA World Series
Tennessee Wesleyan	Appalachian	37–16	Tournament champion	2023 (Upland Bracket)
William Carey (MS)	Southern States	34–14	Tournament champion	2023 NAIA World Series

=== At–Large ===
School	Conference	Record	Last NAIA Appearance
Arizona Christian	Golden State	33–19	2019 (Miami Gardens Bracket)
British Columbia	Cascade	31–19	2023 (Santa Barbara Bracket)
Central Methodist (MO)	Heart	43–9	2023 (Fayette Bracket)
Columbia (MO)	American Midwest	37–14	2023 (Williamsburg Bracket)
Faulkner (AL)	Southern States	35–15	2022 NAIA World Series
Freed–Hardeman (TN)	Mid-South	38–13	2023 (Lawrenceville Bracket)
Hope International (CA)	Golden State	37–14	2023 (Lewiston Bracket)
Keiser (FL)	The Sun	32–21	2022 (Montgomery Bracket)
Loyola (LA)	Southern States	36–17	2022 (Shreveport Bracket)
MidAmerica Nazarene (KS)	Heart	34–18	2023 NAIA World Series
Milligan (TN)	Appalachian	33–20	First Appearance
Oklahoma City	Sooner	35–16	2023 (Bellevue Bracket)
Ottawa (AZ) (OUAZ)	Golden State	34–17	First Appearance
Science & Arts (OK)	Sooner	34–16	2023 (Lewiston Bracket)
Tabor (KS)	Kansas	35–14	2022 (Bellevue Bracket)
Webber International (FL)	The Sun	42–12	2023 (Kingsport Bracket)

== Opening Round ==
=== Fayette Bracket ===
Hosted by Central Methodist (MO) at Estes Baseball Field

==== Bracket ====
First round
1	Hope International (CA)	8
4	Northwestern Ohio	4
3	Tabor (KS)	6
2	Central Methodist (MO)	7^{10}
4	Northwestern Ohio	5
3	Tabor	6

Semifinals
1	Hope International	10
2	Central Methodist	8
3	Tabor	15
2	Central Methodist	4

Finals
1	Hope International	8	9
3	Tabor	12	3

==== Results ====
Monday, May 13; 1:00 PM CDT; Game 1	(3) Tabor (KS)	6–7 (F/10)	(2) Central Methodist (MO)	Estes Baseball Field, Fayette, MO
Monday, May 13; 1:00 PM CDT; Game 1	LP: Sergio Gutierrez (0–1)	Boxscore	WP: Marcus Pritchard (6–1)	Estes Baseball Field, Fayette, MO
Monday, May 13; 1:00 PM CDT; Game 1	HR: Jackie Jimenez (8)	Boxscore		Estes Baseball Field, Fayette, MO

Monday, May 13; 5:30 PM CDT; Game 2	(4) Northwestern Ohio	4–8	(1) Hope International (CA)	Estes Baseball Field, Fayette, MO
Monday, May 13; 5:30 PM CDT; Game 2	LP: Michael Joyce (4–1)	Boxscore	WP: Trey Seeley (8–3)	Estes Baseball Field, Fayette, MO
Monday, May 13; 5:30 PM CDT; Game 2	HR: Joskar Feliciano (2)	Boxscore	HR: David Rivera (12), Derek Sims (3)	Estes Baseball Field, Fayette, MO

Tuesday, May 14; 2:00 PM CDT; Game 3	(4) Northwestern Ohio	5–6	(3) Tabor (KS)	Estes Baseball Field, Fayette, MO
Tuesday, May 14; 2:00 PM CDT; Game 3	LP: Jack Olberding (3–1)	Boxscore	WP: Evan Williams (4–0)	Estes Baseball Field, Fayette, MO
Tuesday, May 14; 2:00 PM CDT; Game 3	HR: Nolan Hull (4)	Boxscore		Estes Baseball Field, Fayette, MO

Tuesday, May 14; 5:00 PM CDT; Game 4	(1) Hope International (CA)	10–8	(2) Central Methodist (MO)	Estes Baseball Field, Fayette, MO
Tuesday, May 14; 5:00 PM CDT; Game 4	WP: Justin Drury (9–0); Sv: Steven Ordorica (3)	Boxscore	LP: Sebastian Escobar (9–2)	Estes Baseball Field, Fayette, MO
Tuesday, May 14; 5:00 PM CDT; Game 4	HR: Derek Sims (4)	Boxscore	HR: Tanner Sears (15), Joseph Weatherford (10)	Estes Baseball Field, Fayette, MO

Wednesday, May 15; 2:00 PM CDT; Game 5	(2) Central Methodist (MO)	4–15	(3) Tabor (KS)	Estes Baseball Field, Fayette, MO
Wednesday, May 15; 2:00 PM CDT; Game 5	LP: Foster Seitz (8–2)	Boxscore	WP: Marcelo Aguirre (7–2)	Estes Baseball Field, Fayette, MO
Wednesday, May 15; 2:00 PM CDT; Game 5	HR: Carlos Negron (15)	Boxscore	HR: Trotter Boston (8), Jackie Jimenez (9), Cody Moore (9), Juan Rosa Gonzalez (11)	Estes Baseball Field, Fayette, MO

Wednesday, May 15; 5:00 PM CDT; Game 6	(3) Tabor (KS)	12–8	(1) Hope International (CA)	Estes Baseball Field, Fayette, MO
Wednesday, May 15; 5:00 PM CDT; Game 6	WP: Garrick Levesque (6–1)	Boxscore	LP: David Rudd-Grow (1–2)	Estes Baseball Field, Fayette, MO
Wednesday, May 15; 5:00 PM CDT; Game 6	HR: Trotter Boston (9), Garryn Plummer 2 (10)	Boxscore		Estes Baseball Field, Fayette, MO

Thursday, May 16; 10:00 AM CDT; Game 7	(1) Hope International (CA)	9–3	(3) Tabor (KS)	Estes Baseball Field, Fayette, MO
Thursday, May 16; 10:00 AM CDT; Game 7	WP: Trey Seeley (9–3)	Boxscore	LP: Payton Tinkler (6–4)	Estes Baseball Field, Fayette, MO
Thursday, May 16; 10:00 AM CDT; Game 7	HR: Alex Moreno (6), JJ Cruz (12), Ryan Lamastra (3)	Boxscore	HR: Cody Moore 2 (11), Brady Cardozo (1)	Estes Baseball Field, Fayette, MO

=== Hattiesburg Bracket ===
Hosted by William Carey (MS) at Milton Wheeler Field

==== Bracket ====
First round
1	Mid-America Christian (OK)	2
4	Milligan (TN)	4
3	Oklahoma Wesleyan	5
2	William Carey (MS)	6
1	Mid-America Christian	5
3	Oklahoma Wesleyan	4

Semifinals
4	Milligan	5
2	William Carey	24
1	Mid-America Christian	7
4	Milligan	8

Finals
2	William Carey	11	–
4	Milligan	4	–

==== Results ====
Monday, May 13; 1:30 PM CDT; Game 1	(3) Oklahoma Wesleyan	5–6	(2) William Carey (MS)	Milton Wheeler Field, Hattiesburg, MS; Umpires: HP: Gary Mauldin, 1B: Rodney Lewis, 2B: Eric Becnel, 3B: Skip Powe
Monday, May 13; 1:30 PM CDT; Game 1	LP: Evan Foor (9–3)	Boxscore	WP: Luke Lycette (7–1); Sv: John Snyder (13)	Milton Wheeler Field, Hattiesburg, MS; Umpires: HP: Gary Mauldin, 1B: Rodney Lewis, 2B: Eric Becnel, 3B: Skip Powe
Monday, May 13; 1:30 PM CDT; Game 1	HR: Josh Logan (18)	Boxscore		Milton Wheeler Field, Hattiesburg, MS; Umpires: HP: Gary Mauldin, 1B: Rodney Lewis, 2B: Eric Becnel, 3B: Skip Powe

Monday, May 13; 5:00 PM CDT; Game 2	(4) Milligan (TN)	4–2	(1) Mid-America Christian (OK)	Milton Wheeler Field, Hattiesburg, MS; Umpires: HP: Jonathan Smith, 1B: Eric Becnel, 2B: Skip Powe, 3B; Brian Ebee
Monday, May 13; 5:00 PM CDT; Game 2	WP: Joe Ducharme (3–3); Sv: Vicente Mendoza (2)	Boxscore	LP: Zane Robeaux (10–1)	Milton Wheeler Field, Hattiesburg, MS; Umpires: HP: Jonathan Smith, 1B: Eric Becnel, 2B: Skip Powe, 3B; Brian Ebee
Monday, May 13; 5:00 PM CDT; Game 2	HR: Ryan Molinari (4)	Boxscore		Milton Wheeler Field, Hattiesburg, MS; Umpires: HP: Jonathan Smith, 1B: Eric Becnel, 2B: Skip Powe, 3B; Brian Ebee

Tuesday, May 14; 1:30 PM CDT; Game 3	(1) Mid-America Christian (OK)	5–4	(3) Oklahoma Wesleyan	Milton Wheeler Field, Hattiesburg, MS; Umpires: HP: Brian Eby, 1B: Tyler Cook, 2B: Eric Becnel, 3B: Jonathan Smith
Tuesday, May 14; 1:30 PM CDT; Game 3	WP: Cameron Brown (5–1)	Boxscore	LP: Kellen Brothers (4–3)	Milton Wheeler Field, Hattiesburg, MS; Umpires: HP: Brian Eby, 1B: Tyler Cook, 2B: Eric Becnel, 3B: Jonathan Smith
Tuesday, May 14; 1:30 PM CDT; Game 3	HR: Noel McGarry-Doyle (9)	Boxscore	HR: Victor Sanchez (20)	Milton Wheeler Field, Hattiesburg, MS; Umpires: HP: Brian Eby, 1B: Tyler Cook, 2B: Eric Becnel, 3B: Jonathan Smith

Tuesday, May 14; 5:00 PM CDT; Game 4	(2) William Carey (MS)	24–5	(4) Milligan (TN)	Milton Wheeler Field, Hattiesburg, MS; Umpires: HP: Rodney Lewis, 1B; Gary Mauldin, 2B: Skip Powe, 3B: Tyler Cook
Tuesday, May 14; 5:00 PM CDT; Game 4	WP: Bobby Magee (4–1)	Boxscore	LP: Vince LaConte (1–1)	Milton Wheeler Field, Hattiesburg, MS; Umpires: HP: Rodney Lewis, 1B; Gary Mauldin, 2B: Skip Powe, 3B: Tyler Cook
Tuesday, May 14; 5:00 PM CDT; Game 4	HR: Brady Wilson (3), Jake Lycette (7)	Boxscore	HR: Vasili Kaloudis (6)	Milton Wheeler Field, Hattiesburg, MS; Umpires: HP: Rodney Lewis, 1B; Gary Mauldin, 2B: Skip Powe, 3B: Tyler Cook

Wednesday, May 15; 1:30 PM CDT; Game 5	(1) Mid-America Christian (OK)	7–8	(4) Milligan (TN)	Milton Wheeler Field, Hattiesburg, MS; Umpires: HP: Eric Becnel, 1B: Jonathan Smith, 2B: Scott McMurrian, 3B: Tyler Cook
Wednesday, May 15; 1:30 PM CDT; Game 5	LP: Zane Robeaux (10–2)	Boxscore	WP: Austin Maxey (2–2)	Milton Wheeler Field, Hattiesburg, MS; Umpires: HP: Eric Becnel, 1B: Jonathan Smith, 2B: Scott McMurrian, 3B: Tyler Cook
Wednesday, May 15; 1:30 PM CDT; Game 5	HR: Taiga Sakuma (2), D'Andre Gaines (13)	Boxscore	HR: Jose Paula (9), Braden Spano (9), Vasili Kaloudis (7), Cade Kalehuawehe (3)	Milton Wheeler Field, Hattiesburg, MS; Umpires: HP: Eric Becnel, 1B: Jonathan Smith, 2B: Scott McMurrian, 3B: Tyler Cook

Wednesday, May 15; 5:00 PM CDT; Game 6	(4) Milligan (TN)	4–11	(2) William Carey (MS)	Milton Wheeler Field, Hattiesburg, MS; Umpires: HP: Skip Powe, 1B: Brian Eby, 2B: Rodney Lewis, 3B: Gary Mauldin
Wednesday, May 15; 5:00 PM CDT; Game 6	LP: Canyon Green (0–4)	Boxscore	WP: Preston Ratliff (2–2)	Milton Wheeler Field, Hattiesburg, MS; Umpires: HP: Skip Powe, 1B: Brian Eby, 2B: Rodney Lewis, 3B: Gary Mauldin
Wednesday, May 15; 5:00 PM CDT; Game 6	HR: Vasili Kaloudis (8)	Boxscore	HR: Bridley Thomas (4), Preston Ratliff (1), Bailee Hendon (10)	Milton Wheeler Field, Hattiesburg, MS; Umpires: HP: Skip Powe, 1B: Brian Eby, 2B: Rodney Lewis, 3B: Gary Mauldin

=== Kingsport Bracket ===
Hosted by Visit Kingsport at Hunter Wright Stadium

==== Bracket ====
First round
1	Webber International (FL)	3
4	Freed–Hardeman (TN)	0
3	Columbia (MO)	0
2	Tennessee Wesleyan	2
4	Freed–Hardeman	5
3	Columbia (MO)	6

Semifinals
1	Webber International	2
2	Tennessee Wesleyan	6
3	Columbia (MO)	6
1	Webber International	5

Finals
2	Tennessee Wesleyan	9	–
3	Columbia (MO)	8	–

==== Results ====
Monday, May 13; 11:00 AM EDT; Game 1	(3) Columbia (MO)	0–2	(2) Tennessee Wesleyan	Hunter Wright Stadium; Attendance: 224
Monday, May 13; 11:00 AM EDT; Game 1	LP: Reece Clapp (8–5)	Boxscore	WP: Blake Peyton (9–1); Sv: Gage Vailes (6)	Hunter Wright Stadium; Attendance: 224
Monday, May 13; 11:00 AM EDT; Game 1		Boxscore	HR: Kruise Newman (13)	Hunter Wright Stadium; Attendance: 224

Monday, May 13; 2:00 PM EDT; Game 2	(4) Freed–Hardeman (TN)	0–3	(1) Webber International (FL)	Hunter Wright Stadium; Attendance: 235
Monday, May 13; 2:00 PM EDT; Game 2	LP: Colton Huntt (7–6)	Boxscore	WP: Blayne Hunter (11–0); Sv: Seth Lovell (6)	Hunter Wright Stadium; Attendance: 235
Monday, May 13; 2:00 PM EDT; Game 2		Boxscore	HR: Tyren Milliner (11), Jarrett May (3)	Hunter Wright Stadium; Attendance: 235

Tuesday, May 14; 10:00 AM EDT; Game 3	(4) Freed–Hardeman (TN)	5–6	(3) Columbia (MO)	Hunter Wright Stadium; Attendance: 222
Tuesday, May 14; 10:00 AM EDT; Game 3	LP: Seth Creasy (3–2)	Boxscore	WP: Pierce Hartmann (8–1)	Hunter Wright Stadium; Attendance: 222
Tuesday, May 14; 10:00 AM EDT; Game 3	HR: Cade Fuller 2 (15)	Boxscore		Hunter Wright Stadium; Attendance: 222

Tuesday, May 14; 2:00 PM EDT; Game 4	(2) Tennessee Wesleyan	6–2	(1) Webber International (FL)	Hunter Wright Stadium; Attendance: 236
Tuesday, May 14; 2:00 PM EDT; Game 4	WP: Christian Delashmit (6–4)	Boxscore	LP: Dylan Martin (7–3)	Hunter Wright Stadium; Attendance: 236
Tuesday, May 14; 2:00 PM EDT; Game 4	HR: Braxton Turner (17), Kruise Newman (14)	Boxscore		Hunter Wright Stadium; Attendance: 236

Wednesday, May 15; 10:00 AM EDT; Game 5	(1) Webber International (FL)	5–6	(3) Columbia (MO)	Hunter Wright Stadium; Attendance: 225
Wednesday, May 15; 10:00 AM EDT; Game 5	LP: Brayden Matthews (7–3)	Boxscore	WP: Kam Dohogne (3–3); Sv: Tyler Renn (4)	Hunter Wright Stadium; Attendance: 225

Wednesday, May 15; 7:00 PM EDT; Game 6	(3) Columbia (MO)	8–9	(2) Tennessee Wesleyan	Hunter Wright Stadium; Attendance: 246
Wednesday, May 15; 7:00 PM EDT; Game 6	LP: Cayden Nicoletto (0–2)	Boxscore	WP: Julian Berinti (1–1)	Hunter Wright Stadium; Attendance: 246
Wednesday, May 15; 7:00 PM EDT; Game 6	HR: Tyler Renn (14), Brayden McGinnis (17)	Boxscore		Hunter Wright Stadium; Attendance: 246

=== Lawrenceville Bracket ===
Hosted by Georgia Gwinnett at Grizzly Baseball Complex

==== Bracket ====
First round
4	Bushnell (OR)	4
5	Louisiana Christian	6
First round
4	Bushnell	6
3	OUAZ	12

Second round
1	Georgia Gwinnett	26
5	Louisiana Christian	2
2	Faulkner (AL)	3
3	OUAZ	0
Second round
5	Louisiana Christian	9
3	OUAZ	4

Semifinals
1	Georgia Gwinnett	3
2	Faulkner	6
Semifinals
1	Georgia Gwinnett	20
5	Louisiana Christian	1

Finals
2	Faulkner	3	6
1	Georgia Gwinnett	16	7

==== Results ====
Monday, May 13; 9:00 AM EDT; Game 1	(5) Louisiana Christian	6–4	(4) Bushnell (OR)	Grizzly Baseball Complex, Lawrenceville, GA; Attendance: 224; Umpires: HP: Craig Trussell, 1B: Jackie Halstead, 2B: Matthew Hunter, 3B: Mike Presto
Monday, May 13; 9:00 AM EDT; Game 1	WP: Cy Fontenot (5–2); Sv: Jayden Drake (1)	Boxscore	LP: Austin Wolfe (5–2)	Grizzly Baseball Complex, Lawrenceville, GA; Attendance: 224; Umpires: HP: Craig Trussell, 1B: Jackie Halstead, 2B: Matthew Hunter, 3B: Mike Presto
Monday, May 13; 9:00 AM EDT; Game 1		Boxscore	HR: Jordan Wilson (15)	Grizzly Baseball Complex, Lawrenceville, GA; Attendance: 224; Umpires: HP: Craig Trussell, 1B: Jackie Halstead, 2B: Matthew Hunter, 3B: Mike Presto

Monday, May 13; 1:00 PM EDT; Game 2	(3) OUAZ	0–3	(2) Faulkner (AL)	Grizzly Baseball Complex, Lawrenceville, GA; Attendance: 42; Umpires: HP: Dan Berry, 1B: Ron Ragan, 2B: Jackie Halstead, 3B: Russ Nelson
Monday, May 13; 1:00 PM EDT; Game 2	LP: Zach Hangas (8–3)	Boxscore	WP: Marco Ozuna (10–1)	Grizzly Baseball Complex, Lawrenceville, GA; Attendance: 42; Umpires: HP: Dan Berry, 1B: Ron Ragan, 2B: Jackie Halstead, 3B: Russ Nelson

Monday, May 13; 5:00 PM EDT; Game 3	(5) Louisiana Christian	2–26	(1) Georgia Gwinnett	Grizzly Baseball Complex, Lawrenceville, GA; Attendance: 290; Umpires: HP: Van Lewsader, 1B: Manuel Gonzalez, 2B: Russ Nelson, 3B: Matt Dryer
Monday, May 13; 5:00 PM EDT; Game 3	LP: Jacob Bareswill (4–1)	Boxscore	WP: Gage Williams (11–1)	Grizzly Baseball Complex, Lawrenceville, GA; Attendance: 290; Umpires: HP: Van Lewsader, 1B: Manuel Gonzalez, 2B: Russ Nelson, 3B: Matt Dryer
Monday, May 13; 5:00 PM EDT; Game 3		Boxscore	HR: Blaze O'Saben (14), Ajay Sczepkowski (19), Henry Daniels (17), Caden Smith (9)	Grizzly Baseball Complex, Lawrenceville, GA; Attendance: 290; Umpires: HP: Van Lewsader, 1B: Manuel Gonzalez, 2B: Russ Nelson, 3B: Matt Dryer

Tuesday, May 13; 11:00 AM EDT; Game 4	(4) Bushnell (OR)	6–12	(3) OUAZ	Grizzly Baseball Complex, Lawrenceville, GA; Attendance: 38; Umpires: HP: Thomas Chestnut, 1B: Jackie Halstead, 2B: Dan Berry, 3B: Ron Ragan
Tuesday, May 13; 11:00 AM EDT; Game 4	LP: Colby Knutzen (1–5)	Boxscore	WP: Trey Trimble (4–4)	Grizzly Baseball Complex, Lawrenceville, GA; Attendance: 38; Umpires: HP: Thomas Chestnut, 1B: Jackie Halstead, 2B: Dan Berry, 3B: Ron Ragan
Tuesday, May 13; 11:00 AM EDT; Game 4	HR: Isaiah Hart 2 (8)	Boxscore		Grizzly Baseball Complex, Lawrenceville, GA; Attendance: 38; Umpires: HP: Thomas Chestnut, 1B: Jackie Halstead, 2B: Dan Berry, 3B: Ron Ragan

Tuesday, May 14; 3:00 PM EDT; Game 5	(1) Georgia Gwinnett	3–6	(2) Faulkner (AL)	Grizzly Baseball Complex, Lawrenceville, GA; Attendance: 191; Umpires: HP: Matthew Hunter, 1B: Ron Ragan, 2B: Craig Trussell, 3B: Thomas Chestnut
Tuesday, May 14; 3:00 PM EDT; Game 5	LP: Ben Harris (10–1)	Boxscore	WP: Mose Hayes (7–1); Sv: Hunter Dupuy (3)	Grizzly Baseball Complex, Lawrenceville, GA; Attendance: 191; Umpires: HP: Matthew Hunter, 1B: Ron Ragan, 2B: Craig Trussell, 3B: Thomas Chestnut

Tuesday, May 14; 7:00 PM EDT; Game 6	(3) OUAZ	4–9	(5) Louisiana Christian	Grizzly Baseball Complex, Lawrenceville, GA; Attendance: 134; Umpires: HP: Manny Gonzalez, 1B: Mike Presto, 2B: Matt Dryer, 3B: Van Lewsader
Tuesday, May 14; 7:00 PM EDT; Game 6	LP: Connor Wilson (4–2)		WP: Andrew Yuratich (7–3)	Grizzly Baseball Complex, Lawrenceville, GA; Attendance: 134; Umpires: HP: Manny Gonzalez, 1B: Mike Presto, 2B: Matt Dryer, 3B: Van Lewsader

Wednesday, May 14; 11:00 AM EDT; Game 7	(1) Georgia Gwinnett	20–1	(5) Louisiana Christian	Grizzly Baseball Complex, Lawrenceville, GA; Umpires: HP: Jackie Halstead, 1B: Craig Trussell, 2B: Thomas Chestnut, 3B: Dan Berry
Wednesday, May 14; 11:00 AM EDT; Game 7	WP: Tyler Clayton (8–0)	Boxscore	LP: Trip Flotte (1–3)	Grizzly Baseball Complex, Lawrenceville, GA; Umpires: HP: Jackie Halstead, 1B: Craig Trussell, 2B: Thomas Chestnut, 3B: Dan Berry
Wednesday, May 14; 11:00 AM EDT; Game 7	HR: Jackson Cobb (2), Paul Winland Jr. 2 (14), Caden Smith 2 (11)	Boxscore		Grizzly Baseball Complex, Lawrenceville, GA; Umpires: HP: Jackie Halstead, 1B: Craig Trussell, 2B: Thomas Chestnut, 3B: Dan Berry

Wednesday, May 14; 3:00 PM EDT; Game 8	(2) Faulkner (AL)	3–16	(1) Georgia Gwinnett	Grizzly Baseball Complex, Lawrenceville, GA; Umpires: HP: Craig Trussell, 1B: Russ Nelson, 2B: Matthew Hunter, 3B: Dan Berry
Wednesday, May 14; 3:00 PM EDT; Game 8	LP: Alexis Saldana (2–4)	Boxscore	WP: Kaleb Hill (10–1)	Grizzly Baseball Complex, Lawrenceville, GA; Umpires: HP: Craig Trussell, 1B: Russ Nelson, 2B: Matthew Hunter, 3B: Dan Berry
Wednesday, May 14; 3:00 PM EDT; Game 8	HR: Orlando Lorduy (9)	Boxscore	HR: Henry Daniels (18)	Grizzly Baseball Complex, Lawrenceville, GA; Umpires: HP: Craig Trussell, 1B: Russ Nelson, 2B: Matthew Hunter, 3B: Dan Berry

Thursday, May 15; 11:00 AM EDT; Game 9	(2) Faulkner (AL)	6–7	(1) Georgia Gwinnett	Grizzly Baseball Complex, Lawrenceville, GA; Attendance: 141; Umpires: HP: Russ Nelson, 1B: Ron Ragan, 2B: Thomas Chestnut, 3B: Jackie Halstead
Thursday, May 15; 11:00 AM EDT; Game 9	LP: Marco Ozuna (10–2)	Boxscore	WP: Tyler Martin (5–0)	Grizzly Baseball Complex, Lawrenceville, GA; Attendance: 141; Umpires: HP: Russ Nelson, 1B: Ron Ragan, 2B: Thomas Chestnut, 3B: Jackie Halstead
Thursday, May 15; 11:00 AM EDT; Game 9		Boxscore	HR: Henry Daniels (19)	Grizzly Baseball Complex, Lawrenceville, GA; Attendance: 141; Umpires: HP: Russ Nelson, 1B: Ron Ragan, 2B: Thomas Chestnut, 3B: Jackie Halstead

=== Lewiston Bracket ===
Hosted by Lewis–Clark State (ID) at Harris Field

==== Bracket ====
First round
4	British Columbia	5
5	Embry–Riddle (AZ)	2
First round
5	Embry–Riddle (AZ)	10
2	Oklahoma City	0

Second round
1	Lewis–Clark State (ID)	8
4	British Columbia	1
2	Oklahoma City	3
3	Arizona Christian	10
Second round
4	British Columbia	4
5	Embry–Riddle (AZ)	3

Semifinals
1	Lewis–Clark State	0
3	Arizona Christian	11
Semifinals
1	Lewis–Clark State	3
4	British Columbia	8

Finals
3	Arizona Christian	8	–
4	British Columbia	7	–

==== Results ====
Monday, May 13; 11:00 AM PDT; Game 1	(5) Embry–Riddle (AZ)	2–5	(4) British Columbia	Harris Field; Attendance: 250; Umpires: HP: Greg Xepoleas, 1B: Jim Clifford, 2B: Chad Chittenden, 3B: Alex Chavez
Monday, May 13; 11:00 AM PDT; Game 1	LP: Cole Altherr (6–4)	Boxscore	WP: Sean Heppner (6–2); Sv: Evan Hoegler (5)	Harris Field; Attendance: 250; Umpires: HP: Greg Xepoleas, 1B: Jim Clifford, 2B: Chad Chittenden, 3B: Alex Chavez

Monday, May 13; 2:30 PM PDT; Game 2	(3) Arizona Christian	10–3	(2) Oklahoma City	Harris Field; Attendance: 200; Umpires: HP: Kevin Rice, 1B: Chad Chittenden, 2B: Daniel Clemens, 3B: Greg Xepoleas
Monday, May 13; 2:30 PM PDT; Game 2	WP: Eli Elliott (7–4)	Boxscore	LP: Andrew Limbaugh (7–3)	Harris Field; Attendance: 200; Umpires: HP: Kevin Rice, 1B: Chad Chittenden, 2B: Daniel Clemens, 3B: Greg Xepoleas
Monday, May 13; 2:30 PM PDT; Game 2	HR: Andrew Ivy (8), Ryan Eastham (5)	Boxscore		Harris Field; Attendance: 200; Umpires: HP: Kevin Rice, 1B: Chad Chittenden, 2B: Daniel Clemens, 3B: Greg Xepoleas

Monday, May 13; 6:00 PM PDT; Game 3	(4) British Columbia	1–8	(1) Lewis–Clark State (ID)	Harris Field; Attendance: 775; Umpires: HP: Jim Clifford, 1B: Daniel Clemens, 2B: Alex Chavez, 3B: Kevin Rice
Monday, May 13; 6:00 PM PDT; Game 3	LP: Vicarte Domingo (2–4)	Boxscore	WP: Shane Spencer (7–1); Sv: Cameron Smith (7)	Harris Field; Attendance: 775; Umpires: HP: Jim Clifford, 1B: Daniel Clemens, 2B: Alex Chavez, 3B: Kevin Rice
Monday, May 13; 6:00 PM PDT; Game 3		Boxscore	HR: Jake Gish (8)	Harris Field; Attendance: 775; Umpires: HP: Jim Clifford, 1B: Daniel Clemens, 2B: Alex Chavez, 3B: Kevin Rice

Tuesday, May 14; 11:00 AM PDT; Game 4	(2) Oklahoma City	0–10	(5) Embry–Riddle (AZ)	Harris Field; Umpires: HP: Chat Chittenden, 1B: Alex Chavez, 2B: Greg Xepoleas, 3B: Jim Clifford
Tuesday, May 14; 11:00 AM PDT; Game 4	LP: Kade Shatwell (7–2)	Boxscore	WP: Jesse Kaphing (7–2)	Harris Field; Umpires: HP: Chat Chittenden, 1B: Alex Chavez, 2B: Greg Xepoleas, 3B: Jim Clifford

Tuesday, May 14; 2:30 PM PDT; Game 5	(1) Lewis–Clark State (ID)	0–11	(3) Arizona Christian	Harris Field; Attendance: 340; Umpires: HP: Josh Behrens, 1B: Greg Xepoleas, 2B: Kevin Rice, 3B: Chad Chittenden
Tuesday, May 14; 2:30 PM PDT; Game 5	LP: Drake George (6–2)	Boxscore	WP: Adrian Santa Cruz (9–4)	Harris Field; Attendance: 340; Umpires: HP: Josh Behrens, 1B: Greg Xepoleas, 2B: Kevin Rice, 3B: Chad Chittenden
Tuesday, May 14; 2:30 PM PDT; Game 5		Boxscore	HR: Marques Titialii (23), Troy Collins (8)	Harris Field; Attendance: 340; Umpires: HP: Josh Behrens, 1B: Greg Xepoleas, 2B: Kevin Rice, 3B: Chad Chittenden

Tuesday, May 14; 6:00 PM PDT; Game 6	(5) Embry–Riddle (AZ)	3–4	(4) British Columbia	Harris Field; Attendance: 125; Umpires: HP: Alex Chavez, 1B: Kevin Rice, 2B: Jim Clifford, 3B: Josh Behrens
Tuesday, May 14; 6:00 PM PDT; Game 6	LP: Spencer Lanz (5–3)	Boxscore	WP: Ryan Beitel (4–4); Sv: Evan Hoegler (6)	Harris Field; Attendance: 125; Umpires: HP: Alex Chavez, 1B: Kevin Rice, 2B: Jim Clifford, 3B: Josh Behrens

Wednesday, May 15; 2:30 PM PDT; Game 7	(4) British Columbia	8–3	(1) Lewis–Clark State (ID)	Harris Field; Attendance: 285; Umpires: HP: Greg Xepoleas, 1B: Jim Clifford, 2B: Chad Chittenden, 3B: Alex Chavez
Wednesday, May 15; 2:30 PM PDT; Game 7	WP: Daniel Orfaly (4–2)	Boxscore	LP: Decker Stedman (3–2)	Harris Field; Attendance: 285; Umpires: HP: Greg Xepoleas, 1B: Jim Clifford, 2B: Chad Chittenden, 3B: Alex Chavez
Wednesday, May 15; 2:30 PM PDT; Game 7	HR: Aaron Marsh (7), Mitchell Middlemiss (10)	Boxscore		Harris Field; Attendance: 285; Umpires: HP: Greg Xepoleas, 1B: Jim Clifford, 2B: Chad Chittenden, 3B: Alex Chavez

Wednesday, May 15; 6:00 PM PDT; Game 8	(4) British Columbia	7–8	(3) Arizona Christian	Harris Field; Attendance: 120; Umpires: HP: Kevin Rice, 1B: Chad Chittenden, 2B: Josh Behrens, 3B: Greg Xepoleas
Wednesday, May 15; 6:00 PM PDT; Game 8	LP: Oliver Duthie (1–1)	Boxscore	WP: Jackson Hohensee (4–2)	Harris Field; Attendance: 120; Umpires: HP: Kevin Rice, 1B: Chad Chittenden, 2B: Josh Behrens, 3B: Greg Xepoleas
Wednesday, May 15; 6:00 PM PDT; Game 8	HR: Aaron Marsh (8)	Boxscore	HR: Marques Titialii (24), Jared Anderson (5)	Harris Field; Attendance: 120; Umpires: HP: Kevin Rice, 1B: Chad Chittenden, 2B: Josh Behrens, 3B: Greg Xepoleas

=== Lincoln Bracket ===
Hosted by Doane (NE) at Sherman Field

==== Bracket ====
First round
4	Mount Mercy (IA)	8
5	St. Francis (IL)	7
First round
5	St. Francis (IL)	4
2	Doane	10

Second round
1	Southeastern (FL)	10
4	Mount Mercy	2
2	Doane (NE)	6
3	Science & Arts (OK)	8
Second round
4	Mount Mercy	5
2	Doane	3

Semifinals
1	Southeastern (FL)	7
3	Science & Arts	2
Semifinals
3	Science & Arts	4
4	Mount Mercy	2

Finals
1	Southeastern (FL)	11	–
3	Science & Arts	2	–

==== Results ====
Monday, May 13; 2:00 PM CDT; Game 1	(5) St. Francis (IL)	7–8	(4) Mount Mercy (IA)	Sherman Field, Lincoln, NE; Attendance: 100
Monday, May 13; 2:00 PM CDT; Game 1	LP: Ryan Daly (9–2)	Boxscore	WP: Zach Barden (4–1); Sv: Nathan Pardini (1)	Sherman Field, Lincoln, NE; Attendance: 100
Monday, May 13; 2:00 PM CDT; Game 1	HR: Drew Dant 3 (9)	Boxscore	HR: Joel Vaske (12), Drake Frazier (3)	Sherman Field, Lincoln, NE; Attendance: 100

Monday, May 13; 5:00 PM CDT; Game 2	(3) Science & Arts (OK)	8–6	(2) Doane (NE)	Sherman Field, Lincoln, NE
Monday, May 13; 5:00 PM CDT; Game 2	WP: Kyler Denton (9–1); Sv: Rob Schmidt (4)	Boxscore	LP: Kellan Voggesser (4–2)	Sherman Field, Lincoln, NE
Monday, May 13; 5:00 PM CDT; Game 2	HR: Christopher Martinez 3 (14), Peyton McDowall 2 (17)	Boxscore	HR: Joe Osborn (13)	Sherman Field, Lincoln, NE

Monday, May 13; 8:00 PM CDT; Game 3	(4) Mount Mercy (IA)	2–10	(1) Southeastern (FL)	Sherman Field, Lincoln, NE
Monday, May 13; 8:00 PM CDT; Game 3	LP: Kyle Lehmann (5–6)	Boxscore	WP: Ramsey David (6–1)	Sherman Field, Lincoln, NE
Monday, May 13; 8:00 PM CDT; Game 3		Boxscore	HR: Isaac Nunez (12), Gary Lora (11), Alfonso Villalobos (2), Josh Smith (7)	Sherman Field, Lincoln, NE

Tuesday, May 14; 11:00 AM CDT; Game 4	(2) Doane (NE)	10–4	(5) St. Francis (IL)	Sherman Field, Lincoln, NE; Attendance: 100
Tuesday, May 14; 11:00 AM CDT; Game 4	WP: Aaron Forrest (11–1); Sv: Ethan Merk (4)	Boxscore	LP: Sean Michalak (2–3)	Sherman Field, Lincoln, NE; Attendance: 100
Tuesday, May 14; 11:00 AM CDT; Game 4	HR: Nate Mensik (4), Noah Winkelman (4)	Boxscore	HR: Cliff Vickers 2 (7)	Sherman Field, Lincoln, NE; Attendance: 100

Tuesday, May 14; 2:30 PM CDT; Game 5	(1) Southeastern (FL)	7–2	(3) Science & Arts (OK)	Sherman Field, Lincoln, NE
Tuesday, May 14; 2:30 PM CDT; Game 5	WP: Darren Smith (11–0)	Boxscore	LP: Ryan Cullinane (1–5)	Sherman Field, Lincoln, NE
Tuesday, May 14; 2:30 PM CDT; Game 5	HR: Isaac Nunez 2 (14), Gary Lora (12)	Boxscore	HR: Gavin Machado (3)	Sherman Field, Lincoln, NE

Tuesday, May 14; 6:00 PM CDT; Game 6	(4) Mount Mercy (IA)	5–3	(2) Doane (NE)	Sherman Field, Lincoln, NE
Tuesday, May 14; 6:00 PM CDT; Game 6	WP: Matt Irvine (4–3); Sv: Josh Fleming (2)	Boxscore	LP: Kaden Crawford (5–3)	Sherman Field, Lincoln, NE

Wednesday, May 15; 11:00 AM CDT; Game 7	(3) Science & Arts (OK)	4–2	(4) Mount Mercy (IA)	Sherman Field, Lincoln, NE
Wednesday, May 15; 11:00 AM CDT; Game 7	WP: Jared Adams (5–4); Sv: Rob Schmidt (5)	Boxscore	LP: Jon Cross (0–2)	Sherman Field, Lincoln, NE

Wednesday, May 15; 2:30 PM CDT; Game 8	(1) Southeastern (FL)	11–2	(3) Science & Arts (OK)	Sherman Field, Lincoln, NE
Wednesday, May 15; 2:30 PM CDT; Game 8	WP: Robb Adams (8–2)	Boxscore	LP: Brian Ereu (12–2)	Sherman Field, Lincoln, NE
Wednesday, May 15; 2:30 PM CDT; Game 8	HR: Josh Pigozzo (12), Josh Smith (8), Tommy Davis (4)	Boxscore	HR: Ben Lawson (6)	Sherman Field, Lincoln, NE

=== Shreveport Bracket ===
Hosted by LSU–Shreveport at Pilot Field (May 13 and 16) and BPCC Baseball Field (May 14 and 15)

==== Bracket ====
First round
4	Talladega (AL)	20
5	Blue Mountain Christian (MS)	7
First round
5	Blue Mountain Christian	5
2	Concordia (NE)	14

Second round
1	LSU–Shreveport	5
4	Talladega	6^{10}
2	Concordia (NE)	8
3	Kansas Wesleyan	15
Second round
1	LSU–Shreveport	8
2	Concordia (NE)	3

Semifinals
4	Talladega	2
3	Kansas Wesleyan	9
Semifinals
4	Talladega	5
1	LSU–Shreveport	11

Finals
3	Kansas Wesleyan	2	–
1	LSU–Shreveport	1	–

==== Results ====
Monday, May 13/Tuesday, May 14 (Note: Game 1 was suspended in the bottom of the 7th with the bases loaded and no outs and Talladega leading 12–7. The game resumed at 11:00 AM CDT the next day at Bossier Parrish Community College (BPCC) as Pilot Field was deemed unplayable.); 2:00 PM CDT; Game 1	(5) Blue Mountain Christian (MS)	7–20	(4) Talladega (AL)	Pilot Field, Shreveport, LA (May 13); BPCC Baseball Field, Bossier City, LA (May 14)
Monday, May 13/Tuesday, May 14; 2:00 PM CDT; Game 1	LP: Matthew Koch (4–6)	Boxscore	WP: Jose Franco (8–3)	Pilot Field, Shreveport, LA (May 13); BPCC Baseball Field, Bossier City, LA (May 14)
Monday, May 13/Tuesday, May 14; 2:00 PM CDT; Game 1	HR: Austin Garrison (6)	Boxscore		Pilot Field, Shreveport, LA (May 13); BPCC Baseball Field, Bossier City, LA (May 14)

Tuesday, May 14; 12:30 PM CDT; Game 2	(3) Kansas Wesleyan	15–8	(2) Concordia (NE)	BPCC Baseball Field, Bossier City, LA; Attendance: 120
Tuesday, May 14; 12:30 PM CDT; Game 2	WP: Nathan Galusha (3–0)	Boxscore	LP: Blake Benson (5–2)	BPCC Baseball Field, Bossier City, LA; Attendance: 120
Tuesday, May 14; 12:30 PM CDT; Game 2	HR: Jacob Williamson (17), Kendall Foster (23), Jarrett Gable (19)	Boxscore		BPCC Baseball Field, Bossier City, LA; Attendance: 120

Tuesday, May 14; 3:30 PM CDT; Game 3	(4) Talladega (AL)	6–5 (F/10)	(1) LSU–Shreveport	BPCC Baseball Field, Bossier City, LA
Tuesday, May 14; 3:30 PM CDT; Game 3	WP: Herson Fernandez (2–2)	Boxscore	LP: Alex Gonzalez (1–1)	BPCC Baseball Field, Bossier City, LA
Tuesday, May 14; 3:30 PM CDT; Game 3	HR: Miguel Oropeza 2 (9), Armando Jackson (4)	Boxscore	HR: Austin Gomm (5)	BPCC Baseball Field, Bossier City, LA

Tuesday, May 14; 6:30 PM CDT; Game 4	(2) Concordia (NE)	14–5	(5) Blue Mountain Christian (MS)	BPCC Baseball Field, Bossier City, LA
Tuesday, May 14; 6:30 PM CDT; Game 4	WP: Caden Johnson (8–2)	Boxscore	LP: Cole Giordano (4–4)	BPCC Baseball Field, Bossier City, LA
Tuesday, May 14; 6:30 PM CDT; Game 4	HR: Jaidan Quinn (27), Joey Grabanski (25)	Boxscore		BPCC Baseball Field, Bossier City, LA

Wednesday, May 15; 10:00 AM CDT; Game 5	(4) Talladega (AL)	2–9	(3) Kansas Wesleyan	BPCC Baseball Field, Bossier City, LA
Wednesday, May 15; 10:00 AM CDT; Game 5	LP: Daniel Jose (6–3)	Boxscore	WP: Zach Westbrook (6–1)	BPCC Baseball Field, Bossier City, LA

Wednesday, May 15; 1:00 PM CDT; Game 6	(1) LSU–Shreveport	8–3	(2) Concordia (NE)	BPCC Baseball Field, Bossier City, LA
Wednesday, May 15; 1:00 PM CDT; Game 6	WP: Lex Meinderts (3–0); Sv: Josh Fortenberry (5)	Boxscore	LP: Jacob Lycan (3–3)	BPCC Baseball Field, Bossier City, LA
Wednesday, May 15; 1:00 PM CDT; Game 6	HR: Austin Gomm (6)	Boxscore	HR: Jayden Adams (11), Joey Grabanski (26)	BPCC Baseball Field, Bossier City, LA

Wednesday, May 15; 4:00 PM CDT; Game 7	(1) LSU–Shreveport	11–5	(4) Talladega (AL)	BPCC Baseball Field, Bossier City, LA
Wednesday, May 15; 4:00 PM CDT; Game 7	WP: AJ Fritz (7–0); Sv: Chase Guitreau (5)	Boxscore	LP: Juan De Dios (2–3)	BPCC Baseball Field, Bossier City, LA
Wednesday, May 15; 4:00 PM CDT; Game 7	HR: Austin Gomm (7), Jose Aquino (10)	Boxscore	HR: Miguel Oropeza (10)	BPCC Baseball Field, Bossier City, LA

Thursday, May 16; 9:00 AM CDT; Game 8	(3) Kansas Wesleyan	2–1	(1) LSU–Shreveport	Pilot Field, Shreveport, LA
Thursday, May 16; 9:00 AM CDT; Game 8	WP: Brett Maddock (9–2); Sv: KT Gearlds (1)	Boxscore	LP: Isaac Rohde (10–3)	Pilot Field, Shreveport, LA

=== Upland Bracket ===
Hosted by Taylor (IN) at Winterholter Field

The first game of the Upland Bracket featured one of the largest comebacks in NAIA postseason history as IU-Southeast trailed Indiana Tech 11–2 heading into the bottom of the 9th. After the first two batters got out, IU-Southeast proceeded to score 12 runs in the bottom of the 9th capped off by a Trevor Goodwin three-run walk-off home run to win 14–11. All 12 runs IU-Southeast scored in the inning were unearned.

==== Bracket ====
First round
4	IU–Southeast	14
5	Indiana Tech	11
First round
5	Indiana Tech	8^{10}
3	MidAmerica Nazarene	7

Second round
1	Missouri Baptist	0
4	IU–Southeast	4
2	Taylor (IN)	10
3	MidAmerica Nazarene (KS)	2
Second round
1	Missouri Baptist	16
5	Indiana Tech	7

Semifinals
4	IU–Southeast	3
2	Taylor	2
Semifinals
2	Taylor	7
1	Missouri Baptist	11

Finals
4	IU–Southeast	14	–
1	Missouri Baptist	10	–

==== Results ====
Monday, May 13; 11:00 AM EDT; Game 1	(5) Indiana Tech	11–14	(4) IU–Southeast	Winterholter Field, Upland, IN; Attendance: 212
Monday, May 13; 11:00 AM EDT; Game 1	LP: Kade Robinson (3–1)	Boxscore	WP: Gavin Knust (3–0)	Winterholter Field, Upland, IN; Attendance: 212
Monday, May 13; 11:00 AM EDT; Game 1		Boxscore	HR: Trevor Goodwin (5)	Winterholter Field, Upland, IN; Attendance: 212

Monday, May 13; 2:30 PM EDT; Game 2	(3) MidAmerica Nazarene (KS)	2–10	(2) Taylor (IN)	Winterholter Field, Upland, IN
Monday, May 13; 2:30 PM EDT; Game 2	LP: Zach Trevino (11–2)	Boxscore	WP: Gabel Pentecost (8–1)	Winterholter Field, Upland, IN
Monday, May 13; 2:30 PM EDT; Game 2		Boxscore	HR: Mason David (9), Sam Gladd (11), Luke Picchiotti (9)	Winterholter Field, Upland, IN

Monday, May 13; 6:00 PM EDT; Game 3	(4) IU–Southeast	4–0	(1) Missouri Baptist	Winterholter Field, Upland, IN; Attendance: 349
Monday, May 13; 6:00 PM EDT; Game 3	WP: Luke Schafer (9–3); Sv: Garrett Hill (6)	Boxscore	LP: Jackson Wells (8–2)	Winterholter Field, Upland, IN; Attendance: 349
Monday, May 13; 6:00 PM EDT; Game 3	HR: Logan Murphy (4), Brayden Hazelwood (5)	Boxscore		Winterholter Field, Upland, IN; Attendance: 349

Tuesday, May 14; 10:00 AM EDT; Game 4	(3) MidAmerica Nazarene (KS)	7–8 (F/10)	(5) Indiana Tech	Winterholter Field, Upland, IN; Attendance: 248
Tuesday, May 14; 10:00 AM EDT; Game 4	LP: Reece Helland (3–5)	Boxscore	WP: Coley Stevens (5–1)	Winterholter Field, Upland, IN; Attendance: 248
Tuesday, May 14; 10:00 AM EDT; Game 4	HR: Brycen Sherwood (12), Noah Castillo 2 (16), Willy Borquez (10)	Boxscore	HR: Brice Stultz (8)	Winterholter Field, Upland, IN; Attendance: 248

Wednesday, May 15; 12:00 PM EDT; Game 5	(2) Taylor (IN)	2–3	(4) IU–Southeast	Winterholter Field, Upland, IN; Attendance: 438
Wednesday, May 15; 12:00 PM EDT; Game 5	LP: Jake Boyer (2–1)	Boxscore	WP: Garrett Hill (3–0)	Winterholter Field, Upland, IN; Attendance: 438
Wednesday, May 15; 12:00 PM EDT; Game 5		Boxscore	HR: Trevor Goodwin (6)	Winterholter Field, Upland, IN; Attendance: 438

Wednesday, May 15; 3:30 PM EDT; Game 6	(1) Missouri Baptist	16–7	(5) Indiana Tech	Winterholter Field, Upland, IN; Attendance: 316
Wednesday, May 15; 3:30 PM EDT; Game 6	WP: Sean Keene (4–0); Sv: Will Casel (1)	Boxscore	LP: Nathan Mack (1–4)	Winterholter Field, Upland, IN; Attendance: 316

Wednesday, May 15; 7:00 PM EDT; Game 7	(1) Missouri Baptist	11–7	(2) Taylor (IN)	Winterholter Field, Upland, IN; Attendance: 549
Wednesday, May 15; 7:00 PM EDT; Game 7	WP: Anthony Caldwell (3–2)	Boxscore	LP: Jack Ross (3–3)	Winterholter Field, Upland, IN; Attendance: 549
Wednesday, May 15; 7:00 PM EDT; Game 7	HR: Alex Adams (22), Jayden Orozco (15)	Boxscore	HR: Mason David (10), Luke Picchiotti (10)	Winterholter Field, Upland, IN; Attendance: 549

Thursday, May 16; 11:00 AM EDT; Game 8	(4) IU–Southeast	14–10	(1) Missouri Baptist	Winterholter Field, Upland, IN; Attendance: 175
Thursday, May 16; 11:00 AM EDT; Game 8	WP: Conner Fries (4–1); Sv: Garrett Hill (7)	Boxscore	LP: Skout Rallo (2–2)	Winterholter Field, Upland, IN; Attendance: 175
Thursday, May 16; 11:00 AM EDT; Game 8	HR: Mason White (17), Luke Powell (5)	Boxscore	HR: Jakob Kouneski (10)	Winterholter Field, Upland, IN; Attendance: 175

=== Waleska Bracket ===
Hosted by Reinhardt (GA) at Ken White Baseball Field

==== Bracket ====
First round
1	Reinhardt (GA)	6
4	Keiser (FL)	4
3	Point Park (PA)	13
2	Jessup (CA)	10
4	Keiser	13
2	Jessup	10

Semifinals
1	Reinhardt	15
3	Point Park	7
4	Keiser	15
3	Point Park	4

Finals
1	Reinhardt	15	–
4	Keiser	8	–

==== Results ====
Monday, May 13; 11:00 AM EDT; Game 1	(3) Point Park (PA)	13–10	(2) Jessup (CA)	Ken White Baseball Field, Waleska, GA; Umpires: HP: Marcus Wilke, 1B: Ken Garner, 2B: Chris Spurlock, 3B: Brandon Smith
Monday, May 13; 11:00 AM EDT; Game 1	WP: Ramon Rodriguez (11–2); Sv: Javier Cardoso II (3)	Boxscore	LP: Kevin Guiterrez (2–1)	Ken White Baseball Field, Waleska, GA; Umpires: HP: Marcus Wilke, 1B: Ken Garner, 2B: Chris Spurlock, 3B: Brandon Smith
Monday, May 13; 11:00 AM EDT; Game 1	HR: Omar Morillo (5), Jared Campbell (17), Eddie Javier Jr. (7), Carlos Burroughs (5)	Boxscore	HR: James Williams III (6), Kayde Iranon (12)	Ken White Baseball Field, Waleska, GA; Umpires: HP: Marcus Wilke, 1B: Ken Garner, 2B: Chris Spurlock, 3B: Brandon Smith

Monday, May 13; 3:00 PM EDT; Game 2	(4) Keiser (FL)	4–6	(1) Reinhardt (GA)	Ken White Baseball Field, Waleska, GA; Attendance: 150; Umpires: HP: Brian Scheetz, 1B: Ken Garner, 2B: Brandon Smith, 3B: Chris Spurlock
Monday, May 13; 3:00 PM EDT; Game 2	LP: Jake Molloy (3–1)	Boxscore	WP: Andrew Herbert (10–1); Sv: Brett Allen (7)	Ken White Baseball Field, Waleska, GA; Attendance: 150; Umpires: HP: Brian Scheetz, 1B: Ken Garner, 2B: Brandon Smith, 3B: Chris Spurlock
Monday, May 13; 3:00 PM EDT; Game 2	HR: Palmer Hutchison (12), Jhamante Woods (9)	Boxscore	HR: Tucker Zdunich (15)	Ken White Baseball Field, Waleska, GA; Attendance: 150; Umpires: HP: Brian Scheetz, 1B: Ken Garner, 2B: Brandon Smith, 3B: Chris Spurlock

Tuesday, May 14; 2:00 PM EDT; Game 3	(2) Jessup (CA)	10–13	(4) Keiser (FL)	Ken White Baseball Field, Waleska, GA; Umpires: HP: Brandon Smith, 1B: Marcus Wilke, 2B: Brian Scheetz, 3B: Chris Spurlock
Tuesday, May 14; 2:00 PM EDT; Game 3	LP: Evan Williams (5–2)	Boxscore	WP: Tanner Goswick (2–2)	Ken White Baseball Field, Waleska, GA; Umpires: HP: Brandon Smith, 1B: Marcus Wilke, 2B: Brian Scheetz, 3B: Chris Spurlock
Tuesday, May 14; 2:00 PM EDT; Game 3	HR: James Williams III (7), Drew Andrews (10)	Boxscore	HR: Jhamante Woods 2 (11), Andrew Almendare (4)	Ken White Baseball Field, Waleska, GA; Umpires: HP: Brandon Smith, 1B: Marcus Wilke, 2B: Brian Scheetz, 3B: Chris Spurlock

Tuesday, May 14; 6:00 PM EDT; Game 4	(1) Reinhardt (GA)	15–7	(3) Point Park (PA)	Ken White Baseball Field, Waleska, GA; Attendance: 200; Umpires: HP: Ken Garner, 1B: Brian Scheetz, 2B: Chris Spurlock, 3B: Marcus Wilke
Tuesday, May 14; 6:00 PM EDT; Game 4	WP: Ben Medley (7–4)	Boxscore	LP: Ethan Parker (7–5)	Ken White Baseball Field, Waleska, GA; Attendance: 200; Umpires: HP: Ken Garner, 1B: Brian Scheetz, 2B: Chris Spurlock, 3B: Marcus Wilke
Tuesday, May 14; 6:00 PM EDT; Game 4	HR: Nash Crowell (22), Tucker Zdunich (16), Dylan Lewis (21)	Boxscore	HR: Isaac Santana (21), Jordon Campbell (10)	Ken White Baseball Field, Waleska, GA; Attendance: 200; Umpires: HP: Ken Garner, 1B: Brian Scheetz, 2B: Chris Spurlock, 3B: Marcus Wilke

Wednesday, May 15; 2:00 PM EDT; Game 5	(3) Point Park (PA)	4–15	(4) Keiser (FL)	Ken White Baseball Field, Waleska, GA; Attendance: 100
Wednesday, May 15; 2:00 PM EDT; Game 5	LP: John Hawley (4–3)	Boxscore	WP: Jake Molloy (4–1)	Ken White Baseball Field, Waleska, GA; Attendance: 100
Wednesday, May 15; 2:00 PM EDT; Game 5		Boxscore	HR: Pablo Ruiz (17), Kenny Di Clemente (6), Jhamante Woods (12)	Ken White Baseball Field, Waleska, GA; Attendance: 100

Wednesday, May 15; 6:00 PM EDT; Game 6	(4) Keiser (FL)	8–15	(1) Reinhardt (GA)	Ken White Baseball Field, Waleska, GA; Attendance: 300
Wednesday, May 15; 6:00 PM EDT; Game 6	LP: Chuck Fishbaugh (7–3)	Boxscore	WP: Hunter Paulsen (6–0)	Ken White Baseball Field, Waleska, GA; Attendance: 300
Wednesday, May 15; 6:00 PM EDT; Game 6	HR: Andrew Almendare (5)	Boxscore	HR: Jarrett Burney (8), Nash Crowell (23)	Ken White Baseball Field, Waleska, GA; Attendance: 300

=== Williamsburg Bracket ===
Hosted by Cumberlands (KY) at Doyle Buhl Stadium

==== Bracket ====
First round
4	Saint Francis (IN)	1
5	Park (MO)	6
First round
4	Saint Francis (IN)	6
2	Bellevue (NE)	4

Second round
1	Cumberlands (KY)	25
5	Park (MO)	0
2	Bellevue (NE)	2
3	Loyola (LA)	6
Second round
5	Park (MO)	7
4	Saint Francis (IN)	9

Semifinals
1	Cumberlands (KY)	16
3	Loyola (LA)	8
Semifinals
3	Loyola (LA)	4
4	Saint Francis (IN)	6

Finals
1	Cumberlands (KY)	11	–
4	Saint Francis (IN)	6	–

==== Results ====
Monday, May 12; 10:00 AM EDT; Game 1	(5) Park (MO)	6–1	(4) Saint Francis (IN)	Doyle Buhl Stadium, Williamsburg, KY; Attendance: 60; Umpires: HP: Jason Tice, 1B: Keith Shartzer, 2B: Roger Fulks, 3B: Chris Mintzer
Monday, May 12; 10:00 AM EDT; Game 1	WP: Adam Stilts (10–2)	Boxscore	LP: Deron Swanson (10–2)	Doyle Buhl Stadium, Williamsburg, KY; Attendance: 60; Umpires: HP: Jason Tice, 1B: Keith Shartzer, 2B: Roger Fulks, 3B: Chris Mintzer

Monday, May 12; 2:30 PM EDT; Game 2	(3) Loyola (LA)	6–2	(2) Bellevue (NE)	Doyle Buhl Stadium, Williamsburg, KY; Attendance: 60; Umpires: HP: Mark McNabney, 1B: Roger Fulks, 2B: Chris Minter, 3B: Ty Unthank
Monday, May 12; 2:30 PM EDT; Game 2	WP: Stephen Still (10–2)	Boxscore	LP: Dustin Schorie (7–2)	Doyle Buhl Stadium, Williamsburg, KY; Attendance: 60; Umpires: HP: Mark McNabney, 1B: Roger Fulks, 2B: Chris Minter, 3B: Ty Unthank
Monday, May 12; 2:30 PM EDT; Game 2		Boxscore	HR: Jake Lacey (12)	Doyle Buhl Stadium, Williamsburg, KY; Attendance: 60; Umpires: HP: Mark McNabney, 1B: Roger Fulks, 2B: Chris Minter, 3B: Ty Unthank

Monday, May 12; 6:00 PM EDT; Game 3	(5) Park (MO)	0–25	(1) Cumberlands (KY)	Doyle Buhl Stadium, Williamsburg, KY; Attendance: 60; Umpires: HP: Keith Shartzer, 1B: Ty Unthank, 2B: Jason Tice, 3B: Mark McNabney
Monday, May 12; 6:00 PM EDT; Game 3	LP: Guillermo Gelpi (6–4)	Boxscore	WP: Knicko Billings (9–0)	Doyle Buhl Stadium, Williamsburg, KY; Attendance: 60; Umpires: HP: Keith Shartzer, 1B: Ty Unthank, 2B: Jason Tice, 3B: Mark McNabney
Monday, May 12; 6:00 PM EDT; Game 3		Boxscore	HR: Charlie Muniz 3 (34), Clay Shelton (2), Evan St. Claire (17), Caden Petrey (23)	Doyle Buhl Stadium, Williamsburg, KY; Attendance: 60; Umpires: HP: Keith Shartzer, 1B: Ty Unthank, 2B: Jason Tice, 3B: Mark McNabney

Tuesday, May 13; 11:00 AM EDT; Game 4	(4) Saint Francis (IN)	6–4	(2) Bellevue (NE)	Doyle Buhl Stadium, Williamsburg, KY; Attendance: 60; Umpires: HP: Roger Fulks, 1B: Chris Minter, 2B: Dean Holland, 3B: Keith Shartzer
Tuesday, May 13; 11:00 AM EDT; Game 4	WP: Perry Stow (5–4); Sv: Graham Kelham (12)	Boxscore	LP: Brock Townsend (5–3)	Doyle Buhl Stadium, Williamsburg, KY; Attendance: 60; Umpires: HP: Roger Fulks, 1B: Chris Minter, 2B: Dean Holland, 3B: Keith Shartzer
Tuesday, May 13; 11:00 AM EDT; Game 4	HR: Nick Parsons (18)	Boxscore	HR: Logan Grant (20), Tyler Monroe (4)	Doyle Buhl Stadium, Williamsburg, KY; Attendance: 60; Umpires: HP: Roger Fulks, 1B: Chris Minter, 2B: Dean Holland, 3B: Keith Shartzer

Tuesday, May 13; 2:30 PM EDT; Game 5	(1) Cumberlands (KY)	16–8	(3) Loyola (LA)	Doyle Buhl Stadium, Williamsburg, KY; Attendance: 200; Umpires: HP: Chris Minter, 1B: Mark McNabney, 2B: Ty Unthank, 3B: Roger Fulks
Tuesday, May 13; 2:30 PM EDT; Game 5	WP: Cesar Avila (12–0)	Boxscore	LP: Carter Holstein (0–1)	Doyle Buhl Stadium, Williamsburg, KY; Attendance: 200; Umpires: HP: Chris Minter, 1B: Mark McNabney, 2B: Ty Unthank, 3B: Roger Fulks
Tuesday, May 13; 2:30 PM EDT; Game 5	HR: Evan St. Claire (18), Johnboy Rittenhouse 3 (13), Ben Snapp (6), Caden Petrey (24)	Boxscore		Doyle Buhl Stadium, Williamsburg, KY; Attendance: 200; Umpires: HP: Chris Minter, 1B: Mark McNabney, 2B: Ty Unthank, 3B: Roger Fulks

Tuesday, May 13; 6:00 PM EDT; Game 6	(4) Saint Francis (IN)	9–7	(5) Park (MO)	Doyle Buhl Stadium, Williamsburg, KY; Attendance: 100; Umpires: HP: Ty Unthank, 1B: Dean Hardin, 2B: Keith Shartzer, 3B: Mark McNabney
Tuesday, May 13; 6:00 PM EDT; Game 6	WP: Lukas North (4–0)	Boxscore	LP: Alex Lozada (3–2)	Doyle Buhl Stadium, Williamsburg, KY; Attendance: 100; Umpires: HP: Ty Unthank, 1B: Dean Hardin, 2B: Keith Shartzer, 3B: Mark McNabney
Tuesday, May 13; 6:00 PM EDT; Game 6	HR: Callan Stauffer (1)	Boxscore		Doyle Buhl Stadium, Williamsburg, KY; Attendance: 100; Umpires: HP: Ty Unthank, 1B: Dean Hardin, 2B: Keith Shartzer, 3B: Mark McNabney

Wednesday, May 14; 11:00 AM EDT; Game 7	(3) Loyola (LA)	4–6	(4) Saint Francis (IN)	Doyle Buhl Stadium, Williamsburg, KY; Attendance: 100; Umpires: HP: Dean Hardin, 1B: Chris Wood, 2B: Dean Holland, 3B: Andy Thomasson
Wednesday, May 14; 11:00 AM EDT; Game 7	LP: Frank Fernandez (3–1)	Boxscore	WP: Blaine McRae (5–4)	Doyle Buhl Stadium, Williamsburg, KY; Attendance: 100; Umpires: HP: Dean Hardin, 1B: Chris Wood, 2B: Dean Holland, 3B: Andy Thomasson
Wednesday, May 14; 11:00 AM EDT; Game 7		Boxscore	HR: Xavier Croxton (8), Nick Parsons (19), Eli Riley (7)	Doyle Buhl Stadium, Williamsburg, KY; Attendance: 100; Umpires: HP: Dean Hardin, 1B: Chris Wood, 2B: Dean Holland, 3B: Andy Thomasson

Wednesday, May 14; 2:30 PM EDT; Game 8	(4) Saint Francis (IN)	6–11	(1) Cumberlands (KY)	Doyle Buhl Stadium, Williamsburg, KY; Attendance: 200; Umpires: HP: Chris Wood, 1B: Dean Holland, 2B: Andy Thomasson, 3B: Dean Hardin
Wednesday, May 14; 2:30 PM EDT; Game 8	LP: Bryce Adams (0–1)	Boxscore	WP: Dustin Sprong (4–2)	Doyle Buhl Stadium, Williamsburg, KY; Attendance: 200; Umpires: HP: Chris Wood, 1B: Dean Holland, 2B: Andy Thomasson, 3B: Dean Hardin
Wednesday, May 14; 2:30 PM EDT; Game 8	HR: Eli Riley (8)	Boxscore	HR: Evan St. Claire (19), Alec Gonzalez (9), Trent Prokes (2), Caden Petrey (25)	Doyle Buhl Stadium, Williamsburg, KY; Attendance: 200; Umpires: HP: Chris Wood, 1B: Dean Holland, 2B: Andy Thomasson, 3B: Dean Hardin

== NAIA World Series ==
The NAIA World Series was held at Harris Field in Lewiston, Idaho from May 24 to 31. This is the first time since 1998 that the NAIA World Series did not feature Lewis–Clark State.

=== Participants ===
School	Conference	Record	Head Coach	Bracket	Previous NAIA WS Appearances	Best NAIA WS Finish	NAIA WS Record
Arizona Christian	Golden State	36–19	Joe McDonald	Lewiston	none	none	0–0
Cumberlands (KY)	Mid-South	51–6	Brad Shelton	Williamsburg	1 (last: 2023)	T-9th (2023)	0–2
Georgia Gwinnett	Continental	51–7	Jeremy Sheetinger	Lawrenceville	6 (last: 2023)	1st (2021)	11–10
Hope International (CA)	Golden State	40–15	Larry Mahoney	Fayette	1 (last: 2017)	T-9th (2017)	0–2
IU–Southeast	River States	36–18	Brett Neffendorf	Upland	1 (last: 2021)	T-5th (2021)	2–2
Kansas Wesleyan	Kansas	48–10	Bill Neale	Shreveport	none	none	0–0
Reinhardt (GA)	Appalachian	41–16	Jonathan Burton	Waleska	1 (last: 2018)	T-9th (2018)	0–2
Southeastern (FL)	The Sun	51–6	Adrian Dinkel	Lincoln	5 (last: 2023)	1st (2018, 2022)	16–7
Tennessee Wesleyan	Appalachian	40–16	Billy Berry	Kingsport	6 (last: 2022)	1st (2012, 2019)	13–10
William Carey (MS)	Southern States	37–14	Bobby Halford	Hattiesburg	5 (last: 2023)	1st (1969)	9–7

=== Bracket ===
==== Preliminary Bracket ====
First round Friday, May 24
8	Kansas Wesleyan	10
9	Arizona Christian	17
7	William Carey	5
10	IU–Southeast	6
First round Saturday, May 25; Losers eliminated
3	Cumberlands	6
7	William Carey	4
8	Kansas Wesleyan	5
4	Hope International	11

First round Friday, May 24; Second round Saturday, May 25
1	Southeastern	3
9	Arizona Christian	5^{11}
4	Hope International	5
5	Reinhardt	7
2	Georgia Gwinnett	5
10	IU–Southeast	2
3	Cumberlands	4
6	Tennessee Wesleyan	7
Second round Monday, May 27; Losers eliminated
1	Southeastern	12
3	Cumberlands	5
10	IU–Southeast	1
4	Hope International	12

Third round Monday, May 27; Winners to Championship Bracket
9	Arizona Christian	13
5	Reinhardt	30
2	Georgia Gwinnett	12
6	Tennessee Wesleyan	6
Third round Tuesday, May 28; Winners to Championship Bracket
6	Tennessee Wesleyan	8
1	Southeastern	6
9	Arizona Christian	1
4	Hope International	8

Fourth Round; Tuesday, May 28
5	Reinhardt	6
2	Georgia Gwinnett	4

==== Championship Bracket ====
First Round; Wednesday, May 29
5	Reinhardt	2
6	Tennessee Wesleyan	6
2	Georgia Gwinnett	11
4	Hope International	15

Semifinal; Thursday, May 30
6	Tennessee Wesleyan	3^{11}
5	Reinhardt	2

Final; Friday, May 31
6	Tennessee Wesleyan	6
4	Hope International	14

=== Game Results ===
All game times are listed in Pacific Daylight Time (UTC−07:00).

==== Preliminary Bracket ====
Friday, May 24; 8:35 am Game 1	(9) Arizona Christian	17–10	(8) Kansas Wesleyan	Harris Field; Attendance: 1170; Umpires: HP: Roger Rangel, 1B: Skip Powe, 2B: Jason Tice, 3B: Cody Whitehead
Friday, May 24; 8:35 am Game 1	WP: Eli Elliott (8–4)	Boxscore	LP: Jarrett Brannen (11–2)	Harris Field; Attendance: 1170; Umpires: HP: Roger Rangel, 1B: Skip Powe, 2B: Jason Tice, 3B: Cody Whitehead
Friday, May 24; 8:35 am Game 1	HR: Andrew Ivy (9), Marques Titialii (25)	Boxscore	HR: Cruz Oxford 2 (10), Zack Beatty (13)	Harris Field; Attendance: 1170; Umpires: HP: Roger Rangel, 1B: Skip Powe, 2B: Jason Tice, 3B: Cody Whitehead

Friday, May 24; 12:50 pm Game 2	(5) Reinhardt	7–5	(4) Hope International	Harris Field; Attendance: 895; Umpires: HP: Tim Arndt, 1B: Jim Courtney, 2B: Jeremy Hosier, 3B: Cory Ray
Friday, May 24; 12:50 pm Game 2	WP: Andrew Herbert (11–1); Sv: Brett Allen (8)	Boxscore	LP: Boom Ward (0–1)	Harris Field; Attendance: 895; Umpires: HP: Tim Arndt, 1B: Jim Courtney, 2B: Jeremy Hosier, 3B: Cory Ray
Friday, May 24; 12:50 pm Game 2	HR: Tucker Zdunich (17), Dylan Lewis (22)	Boxscore		Harris Field; Attendance: 895; Umpires: HP: Tim Arndt, 1B: Jim Courtney, 2B: Jeremy Hosier, 3B: Cory Ray

Friday, May 24; 4:15 pm Game 3	(6) Tennessee Wesleyan	7–4	(3) Cumberlands	Harris Field; Umpires: HP: Cody Whitehead, 1B: Jason Tice, 2B: Skip Powe, 3B: Tim Arndt
Friday, May 24; 4:15 pm Game 3	WP: Gage Vailes (4–2)	Boxscore	LP: Cooper Morgan (4–1)	Harris Field; Umpires: HP: Cody Whitehead, 1B: Jason Tice, 2B: Skip Powe, 3B: Tim Arndt
Friday, May 24; 4:15 pm Game 3	HR: Dante Leach (3)	Boxscore		Harris Field; Umpires: HP: Cody Whitehead, 1B: Jason Tice, 2B: Skip Powe, 3B: Tim Arndt

Friday, May 24; 8:50 pm Game 4	(10) IU–Southeast	6–5	(7) William Carey	Harris Field; Attendance: 790; Umpires: HP: Jim Courtney, 1B: Jeremy Hosier, 2B: Cory Ray, 3B: Tim Arndt
Friday, May 24; 8:50 pm Game 4	WP: Luke Schafer (10–3); Sv: Garrett Hill (8)	Boxscore	LP: Andrew Shirah (8–5)	Harris Field; Attendance: 790; Umpires: HP: Jim Courtney, 1B: Jeremy Hosier, 2B: Cory Ray, 3B: Tim Arndt
Friday, May 24; 8:50 pm Game 4	HR: Mason White 2 (19), Trevor Goodwin (7)	Boxscore	HR: Bailee Hendon (11)	Harris Field; Attendance: 790; Umpires: HP: Jim Courtney, 1B: Jeremy Hosier, 2B: Cory Ray, 3B: Tim Arndt

Saturday, May 25; 8:35 am Game 5	(8) Kansas Wesleyan	5–11	(4) Hope International	Harris Field; Attendance: 495; Umpires: HP: Jason Tice, 1B: Skip Powe, 2B: Roger Rangel, 3B: Cody Whitehead
Saturday, May 25; 8:35 am Game 5	LP: Brett Maddock (9–3)	Boxscore	WP: David Rudd-Grow (2–2); Sv: Josh Landry (1)	Harris Field; Attendance: 495; Umpires: HP: Jason Tice, 1B: Skip Powe, 2B: Roger Rangel, 3B: Cody Whitehead
Saturday, May 25; 8:35 am Game 5	HR: Kendall Foster (24), Tyler Favretto (18), Reece Bishop (14)	Boxscore	HR: JJ Cruz (13)	Harris Field; Attendance: 495; Umpires: HP: Jason Tice, 1B: Skip Powe, 2B: Roger Rangel, 3B: Cody Whitehead

Saturday, May 25; 12:15 pm Game 6	(7) William Carey	4–6	(3) Cumberlands	Harris Field; Attendance: 1010; Umpires: HP: Jeremy Hosier, 1B: Cory Ray, 2B: Tim Arndt, 3B: Jim Courtney
Saturday, May 25; 12:15 pm Game 6	LP: Dario Herrera (6–2)	Boxscore	WP: Cesar Avila (13–0); Sv: Chipper Korbacher (12)	Harris Field; Attendance: 1010; Umpires: HP: Jeremy Hosier, 1B: Cory Ray, 2B: Tim Arndt, 3B: Jim Courtney
Saturday, May 25; 12:15 pm Game 6	HR: Preston Ratliff (2), Braydon Coffey (1)	Boxscore	HR: Charlie Muniz (35)	Harris Field; Attendance: 1010; Umpires: HP: Jeremy Hosier, 1B: Cory Ray, 2B: Tim Arndt, 3B: Jim Courtney

Saturday, May 25; 3:40 pm Game 7	(9) Arizona Christian	5–3 (F/11)	(1) Southeastern	Harris Field; Attendance: 1835; Umpires: HP: Skip Powe, 1B: Roger Rangel, 2B: Cody Whitehead, 3B: Jason Tice
Saturday, May 25; 3:40 pm Game 7	WP: Trey Tarver (1–6)	Boxscore	LP: Reece Wissinger (1–1)	Harris Field; Attendance: 1835; Umpires: HP: Skip Powe, 1B: Roger Rangel, 2B: Cody Whitehead, 3B: Jason Tice
Saturday, May 25; 3:40 pm Game 7		Boxscore	HR: Cristopher Munoz (6)	Harris Field; Attendance: 1835; Umpires: HP: Skip Powe, 1B: Roger Rangel, 2B: Cody Whitehead, 3B: Jason Tice

Saturday, May 25; 7:55 pm Game 8	(10) IU–Southeast	2–5	(2) Georgia Gwinnett	Harris Field; Attendance: 1615; Umpires: HP: Cory Ray, 1B: Tim Arndt, 2B: Jim Courtney, 3B: Jeremy Hosier
Saturday, May 25; 7:55 pm Game 8	LP: Connor Sims (4–3)	Boxscore	WP: Kaleb Hill (11–1)	Harris Field; Attendance: 1615; Umpires: HP: Cory Ray, 1B: Tim Arndt, 2B: Jim Courtney, 3B: Jeremy Hosier

Monday, May 27; 8:35 am Game 9	(3) Cumberlands	5–12	(1) Southeastern	Harris Field; Attendance: 929; Umpires: HP: Jim Courtney, 1B: Jeremy Hosier, 2B: Skip Powe, 3B: Cory Ray
Monday, May 27; 8:35 am Game 9	LP: Kailen Hamson (6–1)	Boxscore	WP: Robb Adams (9–2); Sv: Jake Cohen (1)	Harris Field; Attendance: 929; Umpires: HP: Jim Courtney, 1B: Jeremy Hosier, 2B: Skip Powe, 3B: Cory Ray
Monday, May 27; 8:35 am Game 9	HR: Charlie Muniz (36), Ben Snapp (7)	Boxscore		Harris Field; Attendance: 929; Umpires: HP: Jim Courtney, 1B: Jeremy Hosier, 2B: Skip Powe, 3B: Cory Ray

Monday, May 27; 12:25 am Game 10	(4) Hope International	12–1	(10) IU–Southeast	Harris Field; Attendance: 1016; Umpires: HP: Cody Whitehead, 1B: Tim Arndt, 2B: Jason Tice, 3B: Roger Rangel
Monday, May 27; 12:25 am Game 10	WP: Trey Seeley (10–3)	Boxscore	LP: Tyler Yotkewich (8–6)	Harris Field; Attendance: 1016; Umpires: HP: Cody Whitehead, 1B: Tim Arndt, 2B: Jason Tice, 3B: Roger Rangel
Monday, May 27; 12:25 am Game 10	HR: David Rivera 2 (14), Alex Moreno (7), JJ Cruz 2 (15)	Boxscore		Harris Field; Attendance: 1016; Umpires: HP: Cody Whitehead, 1B: Tim Arndt, 2B: Jason Tice, 3B: Roger Rangel

Monday, May 27; 4:15 pm Game 11	(5) Reinhardt	30–13	(9) Arizona Christian	Harris Field; Attendance: 1333; Umpires: HP: Jeremy Hosier, 1B: Skip Powe, 2B: Cory Ray, 3B: Jim Courtney
Monday, May 27; 4:15 pm Game 11	WP: Ben Medley (8–4)	Boxscore	LP: Eastyn Culp (5–1)	Harris Field; Attendance: 1333; Umpires: HP: Jeremy Hosier, 1B: Skip Powe, 2B: Cory Ray, 3B: Jim Courtney
Monday, May 27; 4:15 pm Game 11	HR: Jarrett Burney (9), Lance Dockery (10), Tucker Zdunich 3 (20), Dylan Lewis 2 (24), Adrian Vargas (5), Matty Maurer (7)	Boxscore	HR: Marques Titialii (26), Riley Quinton (2)	Harris Field; Attendance: 1333; Umpires: HP: Jeremy Hosier, 1B: Skip Powe, 2B: Cory Ray, 3B: Jim Courtney

Monday, May 27; 8:40 pm Game 12	(2) Georgia Gwinnett	12–6	(6) Tennessee Wesleyan	Harris Field; Attendance: 1517; Umpires: HP: Tim Arndt, 1B: Jason Tice, 2B; Roger Rangel, 3B: Cody Whitehead
Monday, May 27; 8:40 pm Game 12	WP: Ben Harris (11–1)	Boxscore	LP: Daniel Davila (7–4)	Harris Field; Attendance: 1517; Umpires: HP: Tim Arndt, 1B: Jason Tice, 2B; Roger Rangel, 3B: Cody Whitehead
Monday, May 27; 8:40 pm Game 12	HR: Ajay Sczepkowski 2 (21), Caden Smith (12)	Boxscore		Harris Field; Attendance: 1517; Umpires: HP: Tim Arndt, 1B: Jason Tice, 2B; Roger Rangel, 3B: Cody Whitehead

Tuesday, May 28; 11:05 am Game 13	(4) Hope International	8–1	(9) Arizona Christian	Harris Field; Attendance: 411; Umpires: HP: Cory Ray, 1B: Jason Tice, 2B: Jeremy Hosier, 3B: Jim Courtney
Tuesday, May 28; 11:05 am Game 13	WP: Justin Drury (10–0)	Boxscore	LP: Eli Elliott (8–5)	Harris Field; Attendance: 411; Umpires: HP: Cory Ray, 1B: Jason Tice, 2B: Jeremy Hosier, 3B: Jim Courtney

Tuesday, May 28; 3:05 pm Game 14	(1) Southeastern	6–8	(6) Tennessee Wesleyan	Harris Field; Attendance: 501; Umpires: HP: Roger Rangel, 1B: Cody Whitehead, 2B: Jim Courtney, 3B: Tim Arndt
Tuesday, May 28; 3:05 pm Game 14	LP: Ramsey David (6–2)	Boxscore	WP: Julian Berinti (2–1); Sv: Jake Sergent (1)	Harris Field; Attendance: 501; Umpires: HP: Roger Rangel, 1B: Cody Whitehead, 2B: Jim Courtney, 3B: Tim Arndt

Tuesday, May 28; 6:35 pm Game 15	(2) Georgia Gwinnett	4–6	(5) Reinhardt	Harris Field; Attendance: 1095; Umpires: HP: Skip Powe, 1B: Jeremy Hosier, 2B: Tim Arndt, 3B: Jason Tice
Tuesday, May 28; 6:35 pm Game 15	LP: Tyler Clayton (8–1)	Boxscore	WP: Brett Allen (6–1)	Harris Field; Attendance: 1095; Umpires: HP: Skip Powe, 1B: Jeremy Hosier, 2B: Tim Arndt, 3B: Jason Tice
Tuesday, May 28; 6:35 pm Game 15	HR: Braxton Meguiar (3)	Boxscore	HR: Dylan Lewis (25), Luis Mendoza (8)	Harris Field; Attendance: 1095; Umpires: HP: Skip Powe, 1B: Jeremy Hosier, 2B: Tim Arndt, 3B: Jason Tice

==== Championship Bracket ====
Wednesday, May 29; 3:05 pm Game 16	(4) Hope International	15–11	(2) Georgia Gwinnett	Harris Field; Attendance: 1214; Umpires: HP: Jeremy Hosier, 1B: Cory Ray, 2B: Skip Powe, 3B: Cory Whitehead
Wednesday, May 29; 3:05 pm Game 16	WP: Steven Ordorica (3–1)	Boxscore	LP: Austin Testerman (0–1)	Harris Field; Attendance: 1214; Umpires: HP: Jeremy Hosier, 1B: Cory Ray, 2B: Skip Powe, 3B: Cory Whitehead
Wednesday, May 29; 3:05 pm Game 16	HR: JJ Cruz (16), Derek Sims (5)	Boxscore	HR: Joe Quelch (11)	Harris Field; Attendance: 1214; Umpires: HP: Jeremy Hosier, 1B: Cory Ray, 2B: Skip Powe, 3B: Cory Whitehead

Wednesday, May 29; 6:35 pm Game 17	(6) Tennessee Wesleyan	6–2	(5) Reinhardt	Harris Field; Attendance: 1330; Umpires: HP: Jason Tice, 1B: Skip Powe, 2B: Jim Courtney, 3B: Tim Arndt, LF: Jeremy Hosier, RF: Roger Rangel
Wednesday, May 29; 6:35 pm Game 17	WP: Daniel Davila (8–4)	Boxscore	LP: Adam Christopher (2–2)	Harris Field; Attendance: 1330; Umpires: HP: Jason Tice, 1B: Skip Powe, 2B: Jim Courtney, 3B: Tim Arndt, LF: Jeremy Hosier, RF: Roger Rangel
Wednesday, May 29; 6:35 pm Game 17	HR: Marco Martinez (14)	Boxscore		Harris Field; Attendance: 1330; Umpires: HP: Jason Tice, 1B: Skip Powe, 2B: Jim Courtney, 3B: Tim Arndt, LF: Jeremy Hosier, RF: Roger Rangel

Thursday, May 30; 6:35 pm Game 18	(5) Reinhardt	2–3 (F/11)	(6) Tennessee Wesleyan	Harris Field; Attendance: 2197; Umpires: HP: Skip Powe, 1B: Cory Ray, 2B: Roger Rangel, 3B: Jim Courtney, LF: Jason Tice, RF: Cory Whitehead
Thursday, May 30; 6:35 pm Game 18	LP: Andrew Herbert (11–2)	Boxscore	WP: Jake Sergent (5–2)	Harris Field; Attendance: 2197; Umpires: HP: Skip Powe, 1B: Cory Ray, 2B: Roger Rangel, 3B: Jim Courtney, LF: Jason Tice, RF: Cory Whitehead
Thursday, May 30; 6:35 pm Game 18	HR: Lance Dockery (11)	Boxscore		Harris Field; Attendance: 2197; Umpires: HP: Skip Powe, 1B: Cory Ray, 2B: Roger Rangel, 3B: Jim Courtney, LF: Jason Tice, RF: Cory Whitehead

==== Championship Game ====
Friday, May 31 6:35 pm PDT at Harris Field Game 19
Team	1	2	3	4	5	6	7	8	9	R	H	E
Tennessee Wesleyan	2	3	1	0	0	0	0	0	0	6	11	4
Hope International	4	0	0	3	1	0	5	1	X	14	17	2
WP: Trey Seeley (11–3) LP: Sam Rochard (7–3) Sv: Steven Ordorica (4); Home runs: TWU: Jack Stevens (12), Kruise Newman (15); HIU: David Rivera (15), JJ Cruz (17), Alec Arnone (5); Attendance: 2653; Umpires: HP: Cory Ray, 1B: Roger Rangel; 2B: Cody Whitehead, 3B: Jason Tice; Boxscore

== See also ==
- 2024 NAIA softball tournament
- 2024 NCAA Division I baseball tournament
- 2024 NCAA Division II baseball tournament
- 2024 NCAA Division III baseball tournament
