= 2023 NAIA baseball tournament =

- Teams: 46
- Finals site: Harris Field; Lewiston, Idaho
- Champions: Westmont (CA) (1st title)
- Winning coach: Tyler LaTorre
- MVP: Isaiah Thomas (Lewis–Clark State)

The 2023 NAIA baseball tournament was the 66th edition of the NAIA baseball championship. The 46-team tournament began on May 15 with Opening Round games across ten different sites and concluded with the 2023 NAIA World Series in Lewiston, Idaho that began on May 26 and ended on June 2.

The Westmont (CA) defeated host Lewis–Clark State in a winner-take-all championship game 7–6 to capture their first national title in program history.

Lewis–Clark State's Isaiah Thomas won tournament MVP honors. Thomas became the first player since Oklahoma City's Chris Bradshaw in 1998 to win the tournament MVP on a non-championship winning team.

The 46 participating teams were selected from all eligible NAIA teams. The World Series host and 31 teams were awarded automatic bids as either champions and/or runners-up of their conferences, and 14 teams were selected at-large by the National Selection Committee. Teams were then placed into one of ten pre-determined Opening Round sites, with six sites consisting of five teams and four sites consisting of four teams, each of which is conducted via a double-elimination tournament. The winners of each of the Opening Round sites participated in the NAIA World Series.

== Tournament procedure ==
A total of 46 teams entered the tournament, with Lewis–Clark State receiving an automatic bid into the Opening Round as World Series host. 31 automatic bids were determined by either winning their conference's regular season championship, conference tournament, and/or conference tournament runner-up. The other 14 bids were at-large, with selections determined by the NAIA Baseball National Selection Committee.

== Opening round hosts ==
On May 1, the NAIA announced the ten opening round host sites, which were played from May 15–18.

Opening Round hosts

Venue	Location	Host
Don Roddy Field	Bellevue, NE	Bellevue University
Estes Baseball Field	Fayette, MO	Central Methodist University
Doyle Buhl Stadium	Williamsburg, KY	University of the Cumberlands
Grizzly Baseball Complex	Lawrenceville, GA	Georgia Gwinnett College
Harris Field	Lewiston, ID	Lewis-Clark State College
Pilot Field	Shreveport, LA	Louisiana State University Shreveport
Winterholter Field	Upland, IN	Taylor University
Hunter Wright Stadium	Kingsport, TN	Visit Kingsport
Russell Carr Field	Santa Barbara, CA	Westmont College
Milton Wheeler Field	Hattiesburg, MS	William Carey University

== Bids ==
=== Automatic ===
School	Conference	Record	Berth	Last NAIA Appearance
Antelope Valley (CA)	Cal Pac	30–14	Tournament champion	2022 (Santa Barbara Bracket)
Bellevue (NE)	North Star	45–8	Tournament champion	2022 NAIA World Series
British Columbia	Cascade	34–19	Tournament champion	2022 (Lewiston Bracket)
Bryan (TN)	Appalachian	35–19	Tournament runner-up	2022 (Upland Bracket)
Columbia (MO)	American Midwest	38–13	Tournament champion	2022 (Upland Bracket)
Concordia (MI)	Wolverine-Hoosier	46–8	Regular season champion	First appearance
Concordia (NE)	Great Plains	38–15	Tournament runner-up	2022 (Bellevue Bracket)
Cumberlands (KY)	Mid-South	46–7	Tournament champion	2022 (Kingsport Bracket)
Dillard (LA)	Gulf Coast	22–28	Tournament champion	First appearance
Doane (NE)	Great Plains	42–10	Regular season champion	2022 (Lewiston Bracket)
Fisher (MA)	Continental	29–23	Tournament runner-up	2022 (Shreveport Bracket)
Freed–Hardeman (TN)	Mid-South	37–19	Tournament runner-up	2022 (Oklahoma City Bracket)
Georgia Gwinnett	Continental	47–5	Tournament champion	2022 NAIA World Series
Grand View (IA)	Heart	34–12	Tournament champion	2015 (Grand Rapids Bracket)
Houston–Victoria (TX)	Red River	26–25	Tournament champion	2014 (Jackson Bracket)
Indiana Wesleyan	Crossroads	36–18–1	Tournament champion	2021 (Marion Bracket)
Kansas Wesleyan	Kansas	42–13	Regular season champion	2022 (Oklahoma City Bracket)
Lewis-Clark State (ID)	Cascade	30–16	World Series host	2022 NAIA World Series
LSU–Shreveport	Red River	44–8	Regular season champion	2022 NAIA World Series
Madonna (MI)	Wolverine-Hoosier	35–15	Tournament champion	2022 (Kingsport Bracket)
McPherson (KS)	Kansas	36–14	Tournament champion	2022 (Miami Gardens Bracket)
MidAmerica Nazarene (KS)	Heart	30–25	Tournament runner-up	2022 NAIA World Series
Midway (KY)	River States	27–22	Regular season champion	2017 (Lima Bracket)
Mobile (AL)	Southern States	35–13	Tournament champion	2019 (Williamsburg Bracket)
Oklahoma City	Sooner	30–19	Tournament champion	2022 (Oklahoma City Bracket)
Point Park (PA)	River States	36–15	Tournament champion	2022 (Lawrenceville Bracket)
Southeastern (FL)	The Sun	52–4	Tournament champion	2022 NAIA World Series
Saint Xavier (IL)	Chicagoland	31–25	Tournament champion	2021 (Bellevue Bracket)
St. Francis (IL)	Chicagoland	25–26	Regular season champion	2015 (Montgomery Bracket)
Taylor (IN)	Crossroads	37–15	Regular season champion	2022 (Upland Bracket)
Union (KY)	Appalachian	30–17–1	Tournament champion	2019 (Lawrenceville Bracket)
Westmont (CA)	Golden State	40–8	Tournament champion	2022 NAIA World Series

=== At–Large ===
School	Conference	Record	Last NAIA Appearance
Ave Maria (FL)	The Sun	34–16	2013 (Daytona Beach Bracket)
Benedictine–Mesa (AZ)	Cal Pac	42–12	2021 (O'Fallon Bracket)
Central Methodist (MO)	Heart	34–17	2021 NAIA World Series
Cumberland (TN)	Mid-South	35–13–1	2018 (Upland Bracket)
Hope International (CA)	Golden State	33–9	2022 (Lawrenceville Bracket)
Missouri Baptist	American Midwest	42–7	2017 NAIA World Series
Morningside (IA)	Great Plains	36–16	2016 (Hutchinson Bracket)
Reinhardt (GA)	Appalachian	33–18	2022 (Montgomery Bracket)
Science & Arts (OK)	Sooner	34–18	2022 (Shreveport Bracket)
Tennessee Wesleyan	Appalachian	42–9	2022 NAIA World Series
Texas Wesleyan	Sooner	36–14	2019 (Henderson Bracket)
Webber International (FL)	The Sun	40–15	2022 NAIA World Series
William Carey (MS)	Southern States	44–9	2022 (Lawrenceville Bracket)
Vanugard (CA)	Golden State	33–16	2022 (Lewiston Bracket)

== Opening Round ==
=== Bellevue Bracket ===
Hosted by Bellevue (NE) at Don Roddy Field

First round
1	Bellevue (NE)	7
4	Grand View (IA)	0
Winner's bracket
3	Oklahoma City	5
2	Doane (NE)	2
4	Grand View	2
2	Doane	3
Loser's bracket

Semifinals
1	Bellevue	6
3	Oklahoma City	3
2	Doane	6
3	Oklahoma City	8^{11}

Finals
1	Bellevue	13	–
3	Oklahoma City	3	–

=== Fayette Bracket ===
Hosted by Central Methodist (MO) at Estes Baseball Field

First round
4	Madonna (MI)	9
5	St. Francis (IL)	6
First round
5	St. Francis (IL)	2
3	Central Methodist	14

Second round
1	Southeastern (FL)	3
4	Madonna	2
2	Kansas Wesleyan	3
3	Central Methodist (MO)	1
Second round
4	Madonna	3
3	Central Methodist	5

Semifinals
1	Southeastern (FL)	15
2	Kansas Wesleyan	1
Semifinals
2	Kansas Wesleyan	16
3	Central Methodist	7

Finals
1	Southeastern (FL)	11	–
2	Kansas Wesleyan	3	–

=== Hattiesburg Bracket ===
Hosted by William Carey (MS) at Milton Wheeler Field

First round
4	Union (KY)	7
5	Houston–Victoria (TX)	10
First round
4	Union (KY)	8
2	Texas Wesleyan	11

Second round
1	William Carey (MS)	7
5	Houston–Victoria	0
2	Texas Wesleyan	8
3	Ave Maria (FL)	20
Second round
5	Houston–Victoria	9
2	Texas Wesleyan	3

Semifinals
1	William Carey	11
3	Ave Maria	2
Semifinals
3	Ave Maria	4
5	Houston–Victoria	3

Finals
1	William Carey	27	–
3	Ave Maria	4	–

=== Kingsport Bracket ===
Hosted by Visit Kingsport at Hunter Wright Stadium

First round
1	Webber International (FL)	4
4	Indiana Wesleyan	9
Winner's bracket
3	Bryan (TN)	10
2	Missouri Baptist	1
1	Webber International	7
2	Missouri Baptist	14
Loser's bracket

Semifinals
4	Indiana Wesleyan	8
3	Bryan	3
2	Missouri Baptist	21
3	Bryan	4

Finals
4	Indiana Wesleyan	7	–
2	Missouri Baptist	6	–

=== Lawrenceville Bracket ===
Hosted by Georgia Gwinnett at Grizzly Baseball Complex

First round
4	Midway (KY)	6
5	Saint Xavier (IL)	5
First round
5	Saint Xavier (IL)	3
3	Concordia (NE)	10

Second round
1	Georgia Gwinnett	18
4	Midway	1
2	Freed–Hardeman (TN)	7
3	Concordia (NE)	4
Second round
4	Midway	7
3	Concordia (NE)	11

Semifinals
1	Georgia Gwinnett	21
2	Freed–Hardeman	4
Semifinals
2	Freed–Hardeman	11
3	Concordia (NE)	8

Finals
1	Georgia Gwinnett	6	7
2	Freed–Hardeman	7	1

=== Lewiston Bracket ===
Hosted by Lewis–Clark State (ID) at Harris Field

First round
1	Hope International (CA)	14
4	Lewis–Clark State (ID)	15
Winner's bracket
3	Concordia (MI)	11
2	Science & Arts (OK)	7
1	Hope International	12
2	Science & Arts	20
Loser's bracket

Semifinals
4	Lewis–Clark State	5
3	Concordia (MI)	4
2	Science & Arts	4
3	Concordia (MI)	10

Finals
4	Lewis–Clark State	19	–
3	Concordia (MI)	7	–

=== Santa Barbara Bracket ===
Hosted by Westmont (CA) at Russell Carr Field

First round
4	British Columbia	11^{12}
5	Antelope Valley (CA)	10
First round
5	Antelope Valley	2
3	Vanguard	4

Second round
1	Westmont (CA)	7^{10}
4	British Columbia	6
2	Benedictine–Mesa (AZ)	5
3	Vanguard (CA)	4
Second round
4	British Columbia	2
3	Vanguard	10

Semifinals
1	Westmont	7
2	Benedictine–Mesa	2
Semifinals
2	Benedictine–Mesa	11
3	Vanguard	7

Finals
1	Westmont	10	–
2	Benedictine–Mesa	1	–

=== Shreveport Bracket ===
Hosted by LSU–Shreveport at Pilot Field

First round
4	MidAmerica Nazarene (KS)	5
5	Dillard (LA)	2
First round
5	Dillard	1
2	McPherson	9

Second round
1	LSU–Shreveport	4
4	MidAmerica Nazarene	6
2	McPherson (KS)	4
3	Morningside (IA)	10
Second round
1	LSU–Shreveport	6^{10}
2	McPherson	4

Semifinals
4	MidAmerica Nazarene	12
3	Morningside	7
Semifinals
3	Morningside	6
1	LSU–Shreveport	7

Finals
4	MidAmerica Nazarene	6	7
1	LSU–Shreveport	14	6

=== Upland Bracket ===
Hosted by Taylor (IN) at Winterholter Field

First round
4	Point Park (PA)	20
5	Fisher (MA)	3
First round
5	Fisher	9
3	Cumberland (TN)	17

Second round
1	Tennessee Wesleyan	4
4	Point Park	8
2	Taylor (IN)	3
3	Cumberland (TN)	2
Second round
1	Tennessee Wesleyan	30^{12}
3	Cumberland (TN)	18

Semifinals
4	Point Park	10
2	Taylor	12
Semifinals
4	Point Park	6^{10}
1	Tennessee Wesleyan	5

Finals
2	Taylor	12	–
4	Point Park	0	–

=== Williamsburg Bracket ===
Hosted by Cumberlands (KY) at Doyle Buhl Stadium

First round
1	Cumberlands (KY)	13
4	Reinhardt (GA)	5
Winner's bracket
3	Columbia (MO)	10
2	Mobile (AL)	7
4	Reinhardt	5
2	Mobile	2
Loser's bracket

Semifinals
1	Cumberlands (KY)	18
3	Columbia (MO)	4
4	Reinhardt	6
3	Columbia (MO)	9

Finals
1	Cumberlands (KY)	8	–
3	Columbia (MO)	6	–

== NAIA World Series ==
The NAIA World Series was held at Harris Field in Lewiston, Idaho.

=== Participants ===
School	Conference	Record	Head Coach	Bracket	Previous NAIA WS Appearances	Best NAIA WS Finish	NAIA WS Record
Bellevue (NE)	North Star	48–8	Duane Monlux	Bellevue	15 (last: 2022)	1st (1995)	26–29
Cumberlands (KY)	Mid-South	49–7	Brad Shelton	Williamsburg	none	none	0–0
Georgia Gwinnett	Continental	50–6	Jeremy Sheetinger	Lawrenceville	5 (last: 2022)	1st (2021)	11–8
Indiana Wesleyan	Crossroads	39–18–1	Rich Benjamin	Kingsport	none	none	0–0
Lewis–Clark State (ID)	Cascade	33–16	Jake Taylor	Lewiston	40 (last: 2022)	1st (1984, 1985, 1987, 1988, 1989, 1990, 1991, 1992, 1996, 1999, 2000, 2002, 2003, 2006, 2007, 2008, 2015, 2016, 2017)	152–54
MidAmerica Nazarene (KS)	Heart	34–26	Ryan Thompson	Shreveport	1 (last: 2022)	T-9th (2022)	0–2
Southeastern (FL)	The Sun	55–4	Adrian Dinkel	Fayette	4 (last: 2022)	1st (2018, 2022)	13–5
Taylor (IN)	Crossroads	34–26	Kyle Gould	Upland	1 (last: 1969)	T-5th (1969)	1–2
Westmont (CA)	Golden State	43–8	Tyler LaTorre	Santa Barbara	1 (last: 2022)	T-9th (2022)	0–2
William Carey (MS)	Southern States	47–9	Bobby Halford	Hattiesburg	4 (last: 2017)	1st (1969)	7–5

=== Bracket ===
==== Preliminary Bracket ====
First round Friday, May 26
8	Indiana Wesleyan	4
9	Lewis–Clark State	12
7	Taylor	6
10	MidAmerica Nazarene	5
First round Saturday, May 27; Losers eliminated
8	Indiana Wesleyan	5^{11}
5	Bellevue	3
10	MidAmerica Nazarene	4
6	Cumberlands	3

First round Friday, May 26; Second round Saturday, May 27
1	Southeastern	5
9	Lewis–Clark State	2
4	William Carey	6
5	Bellevue	4
2	Georgia Gwinnett	7
7	Taylor	23
3	Westmont	7
6	Cumberlands	3
Second round Monday, May 29; Losers eliminated
2	Georgia Gwinnett	10
8	Indiana Wesleyan	11
9	Lewis–Clark State	16
10	MidAmerica Nazarene	7

Third round Monday, May 29; Winners to Championship Bracket
1	Southeastern	2
4	William Carey	10
7	Taylor	9
3	Westmont	15
Third round Tuesday, May 30; Winners to Championship Bracket
1	Southeastern	6
8	Indiana Wesleyan	4
7	Taylor	3
9	Lewis–Clark State	8

Fourth Round; Tuesday, May 30
4	William Carey	3
3	Westmont	7

==== Championship Bracket ====
First Round; Wednesday, May 31
3	Westmont	3
1	Southeastern	10
4	William Carey	6
9	Lewis–Clark State	15

Semifinal; Thursday, June 1
1	Southeastern	4
3	Westmont	6

Final; Friday, June 2
3	Westmont	7
9	Lewis–Clark State	6

=== Game Results ===
All game times are listed in Pacific Daylight Time (UTC−07:00).

==== Preliminary Bracket ====
Friday, May 26; 8:35 am Game 1	(10) MidAmerica Nazarene	5–6	(7) Taylor	Harris Field; Attendance: 1530; Umpires: HP: Skip Powe, 1B: Jason Tice, 2B: Cory Ray, 3B: Steve Sillers
Friday, May 26; 8:35 am Game 1	LP: Bryce Brecklin (2–3)	Boxscore	WP: Jack Ross (7–0); Sv: Gabel Pentecost (3)	Harris Field; Attendance: 1530; Umpires: HP: Skip Powe, 1B: Jason Tice, 2B: Cory Ray, 3B: Steve Sillers
Friday, May 26; 8:35 am Game 1	HR: Joshua Martinez (4)	Boxscore	HR: TJ Bass (19), Sam Gladd (7)	Harris Field; Attendance: 1530; Umpires: HP: Skip Powe, 1B: Jason Tice, 2B: Cory Ray, 3B: Steve Sillers

Friday, May 26; 12:05 pm Game 2	(6) Cumberlands	3–7	(3) Westmont	Harris Field; Attendance: 740; Umpires: HP: Jeremy Hosler, 1B: Torrell Poole, 2B: Daniel Rios, 3B: Jay Allen
Friday, May 26; 12:05 pm Game 2	LP: Cesar Avila (1–3)	Boxscore	WP: Zach Yates (3–1)	Harris Field; Attendance: 740; Umpires: HP: Jeremy Hosler, 1B: Torrell Poole, 2B: Daniel Rios, 3B: Jay Allen
Friday, May 26; 12:05 pm Game 2	HR: Charlie Muniz (24)	Boxscore	HR: Bryce McFeely (6), Liam Critchett (4)	Harris Field; Attendance: 740; Umpires: HP: Jeremy Hosler, 1B: Torrell Poole, 2B: Daniel Rios, 3B: Jay Allen

Friday, May 26; 3:50 pm Game 3	(5) Bellevue	4–6	(4) William Carey	Harris Field; Attendance: 435; Umpires: HP: Jason Tice, 1B: Cory Ray, 2B: Steve Sillers, 3B: Skip Powe
Friday, May 26; 3:50 pm Game 3	LP: Kenji Miller (2–1)	Boxscore	WP: Preston Ratliff (5–3)	Harris Field; Attendance: 435; Umpires: HP: Jason Tice, 1B: Cory Ray, 2B: Steve Sillers, 3B: Skip Powe
Friday, May 26; 3:50 pm Game 3	HR: Mathieu Sirois (14)	Boxscore		Harris Field; Attendance: 435; Umpires: HP: Jason Tice, 1B: Cory Ray, 2B: Steve Sillers, 3B: Skip Powe

Friday, May 26; 7:30 pm Game 4	(9) Lewis–Clark State	12–4	(8) Indiana Wesleyan	Harris Field; Attendance: 2710; Umpires: HP: Torrell Poole, 1B: Daniel Rios, 2B: Jay Allen, 3B: Jeremy Hosler
Friday, May 26; 7:30 pm Game 4	WP: Trevin Hope (6–3)	Boxscore	LP: Drue Young (6–3)	Harris Field; Attendance: 2710; Umpires: HP: Torrell Poole, 1B: Daniel Rios, 2B: Jay Allen, 3B: Jeremy Hosler
Friday, May 26; 7:30 pm Game 4	HR: Charlie Updegrave (10), Isaiah Thomas (14)	Boxscore	HR: Ty Mathews (10)	Harris Field; Attendance: 2710; Umpires: HP: Torrell Poole, 1B: Daniel Rios, 2B: Jay Allen, 3B: Jeremy Hosler

Saturday, May 27; 9:45 am Game 5	(6) Cumberlands	3–4	(10) MidAmerica Nazarene	Harris Field; Attendance: 280; Umpires: HP: Cory Ray, 1B: Steve Sillers, 2B: Skip Powe, 3B: Jason Tice
Saturday, May 27; 9:45 am Game 5	LP: Hunter Rigsby (7–3)	Boxscore	WP: Zach Trevino (10–2); Sv: Reece Helland (4)	Harris Field; Attendance: 280; Umpires: HP: Cory Ray, 1B: Steve Sillers, 2B: Skip Powe, 3B: Jason Tice
Saturday, May 27; 9:45 am Game 5		Boxscore	HR: Sean Maple (9), Dionathan Cornet (10)	Harris Field; Attendance: 280; Umpires: HP: Cory Ray, 1B: Steve Sillers, 2B: Skip Powe, 3B: Jason Tice

Saturday, May 27; 1:10 pm Game 6	(8) Indiana Wesleyan	5–3 (F/11)	(5) Bellevue	Harris Field; Attendance: 560; Umpires: HP: Daniel Rios, 1B: Jay Allen, 2B: Jeremy Hosler, 3B: Torrell Poole
Saturday, May 27; 1:10 pm Game 6	WP: Hunter Hoffman (7–2)	Boxscore	LP: Easton Brinton (6–2)	Harris Field; Attendance: 560; Umpires: HP: Daniel Rios, 1B: Jay Allen, 2B: Jeremy Hosler, 3B: Torrell Poole
Saturday, May 27; 1:10 pm Game 6		Boxscore	HR: Mathieu Sirois (15)	Harris Field; Attendance: 560; Umpires: HP: Daniel Rios, 1B: Jay Allen, 2B: Jeremy Hosler, 3B: Torrell Poole

Saturday, May 27; 5:20 pm Game 7	(7) Taylor	23–7	(2) Georgia Gwinnett	Harris Field; Attendance: 1695; Umpires: HP: Steve Sillers, 1B: Skip Powe, 2B: Jason Tice, 3B: Cory Ray
Saturday, May 27; 5:20 pm Game 7	WP: Alec Holcomb (7–2); Sv: Gabel Pentecost (4)	Boxscore	LP: Jonathan Haab (2–1)	Harris Field; Attendance: 1695; Umpires: HP: Steve Sillers, 1B: Skip Powe, 2B: Jason Tice, 3B: Cory Ray
Saturday, May 27; 5:20 pm Game 7	HR: Sam Gladd (8)	Boxscore	HR: Ajay Sczepkowski (31), Caden Smith 2 (5)	Harris Field; Attendance: 1695; Umpires: HP: Steve Sillers, 1B: Skip Powe, 2B: Jason Tice, 3B: Cory Ray

Saturday, May 27; 9:30 pm Game 8	(9) Lewis–Clark State	2–5	(1) Southeastern	Harris Field; Attendance: 2155; Umpires: HP: Jay Allen, 1B: Jeremy Hosler, 2B: Torrell Poole, 3B: Daniel Rios
Saturday, May 27; 9:30 pm Game 8	LP: Alec Holmes (1–1)	Boxscore	WP: Reese Wissinger (5–0)	Harris Field; Attendance: 2155; Umpires: HP: Jay Allen, 1B: Jeremy Hosler, 2B: Torrell Poole, 3B: Daniel Rios
Saturday, May 27; 9:30 pm Game 8	HR: Isaiah Thomas (15)	Boxscore	HR: Chayce Bryant (20)	Harris Field; Attendance: 2155; Umpires: HP: Jay Allen, 1B: Jeremy Hosler, 2B: Torrell Poole, 3B: Daniel Rios

Monday, May 29; 8:35 am Game 9	(2) Georgia Gwinnett	10–11	(8) Indiana Wesleyan	Harris Field; Attendance: 580; Umpires: HP: Torrell Poole, 1B: Cory Ray, 2B: Steve Sillers, 3B: Jeremy Hosler
Monday, May 29; 8:35 am Game 9	LP: Cameron Repetti (12–1)	Boxscore	WP: Grayson Knight (4–3); Sv: Jake Engelkes (1)	Harris Field; Attendance: 580; Umpires: HP: Torrell Poole, 1B: Cory Ray, 2B: Steve Sillers, 3B: Jeremy Hosler
Monday, May 29; 8:35 am Game 9	HR: Ajay Sczepkowski 2 (33), Caden Smith (6), Devin Warner (14)	Boxscore	HR: Ty Mathews (11), Jeff Morton (14)	Harris Field; Attendance: 580; Umpires: HP: Torrell Poole, 1B: Cory Ray, 2B: Steve Sillers, 3B: Jeremy Hosler

Monday, May 29; 12:05 pm Game 10	(10) MidAmerica Nazarene	7–16	(9) Lewis–Clark State	Harris Field; Attendance: 3410; Umpires: HP: Jason Tice, 1B: Skip Powe, 2B: Daniel Rios, 3B: Jay Allen
Monday, May 29; 12:05 pm Game 10	LP: Ryan Wilwers (2–6)	Boxscore	WP: Jace Hanson (2–1)	Harris Field; Attendance: 3410; Umpires: HP: Jason Tice, 1B: Skip Powe, 2B: Daniel Rios, 3B: Jay Allen
Monday, May 29; 12:05 pm Game 10	HR: Sean Maple (10), Noah Castillo (12), Joey Calamaio (2)	Boxscore	HR: Charlie Updegrave (11), Isaiah Thomas (16), Dominic Signorelli (11)	Harris Field; Attendance: 3410; Umpires: HP: Jason Tice, 1B: Skip Powe, 2B: Daniel Rios, 3B: Jay Allen

Monday, May 29; 3:05 pm Game 11	(3) Westmont	15–9	(7) Taylor	Harris Field; Attendance: 315; Umpires: HP: Cory Ray, 1B: Steve Sillers, 2B: Jeremy Hosler, 3B: Torrell Poole
Monday, May 29; 3:05 pm Game 11	WP: Aidan Holly (5–1); Sv: Lucien Wechsberg (3)	Boxscore	LP: Nick Crabtree (5–2)	Harris Field; Attendance: 315; Umpires: HP: Cory Ray, 1B: Steve Sillers, 2B: Jeremy Hosler, 3B: Torrell Poole
Monday, May 29; 3:05 pm Game 11	HR: Ryan DeSaegher (6)	Boxscore	HR: TJ Bass (20), Sam Gladd 2 (10)	Harris Field; Attendance: 315; Umpires: HP: Cory Ray, 1B: Steve Sillers, 2B: Jeremy Hosler, 3B: Torrell Poole

Monday, May 29; 6:35 pm Game 12	(1) Southeastern	4–13	(4) William Carey	Harris Field; Attendance: 870; Umpires: HP: Skip Powe, 1B: Daniel Rios, 2B: Jay Allen, 3B: Jason Tice
Monday, May 29; 6:35 pm Game 12	LP: Robb Adams (7–2)	Boxscore	WP: AJ Stinson (8–2)	Harris Field; Attendance: 870; Umpires: HP: Skip Powe, 1B: Daniel Rios, 2B: Jay Allen, 3B: Jason Tice
Monday, May 29; 6:35 pm Game 12	HR: Isaac Nunez (18)	Boxscore	HR: Jake Lycette (13), Patrick Lee (15)	Harris Field; Attendance: 870; Umpires: HP: Skip Powe, 1B: Daniel Rios, 2B: Jay Allen, 3B: Jason Tice

Tuesday, May 30; 11:05 am Game 13	(7) Taylor	3–8	(9) Lewis–Clark State	Harris Field; Attendance: 1505; Umpires: HP: Daniel Rios, 1B: Jason Tice, 2B: Torrell Poole, 3B: Cory Ray
Tuesday, May 30; 11:05 am Game 13	LP: Gabel Pentecost (6–6)	Boxscore	WP: Greg Blackman (3–1); Sv: Alec Holmes (2)	Harris Field; Attendance: 1505; Umpires: HP: Daniel Rios, 1B: Jason Tice, 2B: Torrell Poole, 3B: Cory Ray
Tuesday, May 30; 11:05 am Game 13	HR: TJ Bass (21)	Boxscore	HR: Dominic Signorelli (12)	Harris Field; Attendance: 1505; Umpires: HP: Daniel Rios, 1B: Jason Tice, 2B: Torrell Poole, 3B: Cory Ray

Tuesday, May 30; 3:05 pm Game 14	(8) Indiana Wesleyan	4–6	(1) Southeastern	Harris Field; Attendance: 205; Umpires: HP: Steve Sillers, 1B: Jay Allen, 2B: Jason Tice, 3B: Skip Powe
Tuesday, May 30; 3:05 pm Game 14	LP: Caleb Olson (2–1)	Boxscore	WP: Andrew Long (8–0); Sv: Reese Wissinger (6)	Harris Field; Attendance: 205; Umpires: HP: Steve Sillers, 1B: Jay Allen, 2B: Jason Tice, 3B: Skip Powe
Tuesday, May 30; 3:05 pm Game 14	HR: Ty Mathews (12)	Boxscore	HR: Chayce Bryant (21), David Castillo (9)	Harris Field; Attendance: 205; Umpires: HP: Steve Sillers, 1B: Jay Allen, 2B: Jason Tice, 3B: Skip Powe

Tuesday, May 30; 6:50 pm Game 15	(4) William Carey	3–7	(3) Westmont	Harris Field; Attendance: 890; Umpires: HP: Torrell Poole, 1B: Cory Ray, 2B: Jay Allen
Tuesday, May 30; 6:50 pm Game 15	LP: Lane Jarreau (6–1)	Boxscore	WP: Zach Yates (4–1); Sv: Gabe Arteaga (9)	Harris Field; Attendance: 890; Umpires: HP: Torrell Poole, 1B: Cory Ray, 2B: Jay Allen

==== Championship Bracket ====
Wednesday, May 31; 3:05 pm Game 16	(4) William Carey	6–15	(9) Lewis–Clark State	Harris Field; Attendance: 2175; Umpires: HP: Torrell Poole, 1B: Jay Allen, 2B: Steve Sillers, 3B: Skip Powe
Wednesday, May 31; 3:05 pm Game 16	LP: John Snyder (2–2)	Boxscore	WP: Jake Green (5–0)	Harris Field; Attendance: 2175; Umpires: HP: Torrell Poole, 1B: Jay Allen, 2B: Steve Sillers, 3B: Skip Powe
Wednesday, May 31; 3:05 pm Game 16	HR: Bobby Lada (11)	Boxscore	HR: Carter Booth (12), Nick Seamons 2 (17), Isaiah Thomas 2 (18), Jakob Marquez (14)	Harris Field; Attendance: 2175; Umpires: HP: Torrell Poole, 1B: Jay Allen, 2B: Steve Sillers, 3B: Skip Powe

Wednesday, May 31; 6:35 pm Game 17	(1) Southeastern	10–3	(3) Westmont	Harris Field; Attendance: 770; Umpires: HP: Cory Ray, 1B: Steve Sillers, 2B: Skip Powe, 3B: Daniel Rios
Wednesday, May 31; 6:35 pm Game 17	WP: JJ Sanchez (2–2)	Boxscore	LP: Carlos Moreno (1–1)	Harris Field; Attendance: 770; Umpires: HP: Cory Ray, 1B: Steve Sillers, 2B: Skip Powe, 3B: Daniel Rios
Wednesday, May 31; 6:35 pm Game 17	HR: Chayce Bryant (22), Jose Marcano (7), Nick Block 2 (11)	Boxscore		Harris Field; Attendance: 770; Umpires: HP: Cory Ray, 1B: Steve Sillers, 2B: Skip Powe, 3B: Daniel Rios

Thursday, June 1; 6:35 pm Game 18	(3) Westmont	6–4	(1) Southeastern	Harris Field; Attendance: 1195; Umpires: HP: Jay Allen, 1B: Cory Ray, 2B: Daniel Rios, 3B: Jason Tice
Thursday, June 1; 6:35 pm Game 18	WP: Bryan Peck (10–1); Sv: Lucien Wechsburg (4)	Boxscore	LP: David Mata (4–1)	Harris Field; Attendance: 1195; Umpires: HP: Jay Allen, 1B: Cory Ray, 2B: Daniel Rios, 3B: Jason Tice
Thursday, June 1; 6:35 pm Game 18		Boxscore	HR: Chayce Bryant (23)	Harris Field; Attendance: 1195; Umpires: HP: Jay Allen, 1B: Cory Ray, 2B: Daniel Rios, 3B: Jason Tice

==== Championship Game ====
Friday, June 2 6:35 pm PDT at Harris Field
Team	1	2	3	4	5	6	7	8	9	R	H	E
Lewis–Clark State	0	1	0	0	3	0	2	0	0	6	11	5
Westmont	0	2	1	2	0	1	0	0	X	7	9	3
WP: Gabe Arteaga (3–1) LP: Drake George (1–4); Home runs: LCSC: Charlie Updegrave (12), Isaiah Thomas (19); WC: None; Attendance: 4498; Umpires: HP: Steve Sillers, 1B: Daniel Rios, 2B: Torrell Poole, 3B: Cory Ray; Boxscore

== See also ==
- 2023 NAIA softball tournament
- 2023 NCAA Division I baseball tournament
- 2023 NCAA Division II baseball tournament
- 2023 NCAA Division III baseball tournament
