= 1987 NCAA Division II softball tournament =

- Format: Double-elimination tournament
- Finals site: Quincy, Illinois
- Champions: Cal State Northridge (4th title)
- Runner-up: Florida Southern (1st title game)
- Winning coach: Gary Torgeson (4th title)
- Attendance: 2,337

The 1987 NCAA Division II softball tournament was the sixth annual postseason tournament hosted by the NCAA to determine the national champion of softball among its Division II members in the United States, held at the end of the 1987 NCAA Division II softball season.

The final, four-team double elimination tournament, also known as the Division II Women's College World Series, was played in Quincy, Illinois.

Making their sixth consecutive appearance in the finals, Cal State Northridge defeated Florida Southern in a one-game championship series (4–0) to capture the Matadors' fourth Division II national title and third in five years.

== Bracket ==
=== Finals ===
First Round
Sacred Heart	0
Florida Southern	1
Winner's bracket
Mankato State	0
Cal State Northridge	3
Sacred Heart	1
Mankato State	4
Loser's bracket

Semifinals
Florida Southern	3
Cal State Northridge	4
Florida Southern	1
Mankato State	0

Championship
Cal State Northridge	4	–
Florida Southern	0	–

== All-tournament team ==
- Kelly Winn, 1B, Cal State Northridge
- Patty Otremba, 2B, Mankato State
- Lori Shelly, SS, Cal State Northridge
- Michelle Garrity, 3B, Mankato State
- Barbara Jordan, OF, Cal State Northridge
- Beth Onestinghel, OF, Cal State Northridge
- Beth Greig, OF, Florida Southern
- Debbie Dickman, P, Cal State Northridge
- Dori Stankewitz, P, Florida Southern
- Kim Schmidt, C, Sacred Heart
- Priscilla Rouse, AL, Cal State Northridge
- Carrie Tschida, AL, Mankato State

== See also ==
- 1987 NCAA Division I softball tournament
- 1987 NCAA Division III softball tournament
- 1987 NAIA softball tournament
- 1987 NCAA Division II baseball tournament
