= 1987 NAIA World Series =

1987 NAIA baseball tournament
- 1987 NAIA World Series
- Teams: 10
- Format: Double elimination Page playoff
- Finals site: Harris Field; Lewiston, Idaho
- Champions: Lewis–Clark State (3rd title)
- Winning coach: Ed Cheff
- MVP: Pat Mackey (OF) (Lewis–Clark State)

The 1987 NAIA World Series was the 31st annual tournament hosted by the National Association of Intercollegiate Athletics to determine the national champion of baseball among its member colleges and universities in the United States and Canada.

The tournament was played at Harris Field in Lewiston, Idaho.

Hometown team Lewis–Clark State (55–10) defeated Emporia State (55–11) in a single-game championship series, 11–4, to win the Warriors' third NAIA World Series. Not only was this Lewis–Clark State's third title in four seasons but it would also go on to be the first of six consecutive World Series championships for the program.

Lewis–Clark State outfielder Pat Mackey was named tournament MVP.

== Bracket ==
=== Preliminary bracket ===
First round
Point Park | 3
Southern Arkansas | 13
Anderson (IN) | 0
Lewis–Clark State | 13
Consolation First Round
Missouri Southern State | 6
Anderson (IN) | 4
Huntingdon | 12
Point Park | 13

Second round
Hawaii–Hilo | 1
Southern Arkansas | 11
Grand Canyon | 19
Huntingdon | 8
Elon | 5
Lewis–Clark State | 17
Emporia State | 8
Missouri Southern State | 5
Consolation Second Round
Hawaii–Hilo | 1
Missouri Southern State | 10
Elon | 9
Point Park | 2

Third round
Southern Arkansas | 23
Grand Canyon | 22
Lewis–Clark State | 13
Emporia State | 10
Consolation Third Round (both teams to Semifinals)
Grand Canyon | 12
Missouri Southern State | 6
Emporia State | 18
Elon | 5

Fourth round (both teams to Semifinals)
Southern Arkansas | 3
Lewis–Clark State | 23

=== Championship bracket ===
Semifinals
Lewis–Clark State | 25
Grand Canyon | 11
Southern Arkansas | 7
Emporia State | 14

Championship
Lewis–Clark State | 11
Emporia State | 4

== See also ==
- 1987 NCAA Division I baseball tournament
- 1987 NCAA Division II baseball tournament
- 1987 NCAA Division III baseball tournament
- 1987 NAIA Softball World Series
