= 1987 NCAA Division II baseball tournament =

- Season: 1987
- Finals site: Paterson Field; Montgomery, Alabama
- Champions: Troy State (2nd title)
- Runner-up: Tampa (1st CWS Appearance)
- Winning coach: Chase Riddle (2nd title)
- MOP: Jude Rinaldi (1B) (Troy State)
- Attendance: 18,191

The 1987 NCAA Division II baseball tournament was the 20th edition of the NCAA Division II baseball tournament. The 20-team tournament determined the national champion of baseball among its Division II colleges and universities at the end of the 1987 NCAA Division II baseball season.

For the third year, the tournament was played at Paterson Field in Montgomery, Alabama.

Defending champions Troy State defeated Tampa, 7–5, in the double-elimination final, the Trojans' second Division II national title. Troy State was coached by Chase Riddle.

== Bracket ==
=== College World Series ===
First Round
New Haven	0
Wright State	1
Tampa	0
Troy State	6
Cal State Dominguez Hills	10
Columbus (GA)	7

Second Round
Wright State	4
Columbus (GA)	13
New Haven	4
Tampa	5
Troy State	6
Cal State Dominguez Hills	2
Wright State	5
Cal State Dominguez Hills	2

Semifinals
Columbus (GA)	3
Tampa	17
Troy State	8
Wright State	7

Championship
Tampa	5
Troy State	7

== See also ==
- 1987 NCAA Division I baseball tournament
- 1987 NCAA Division III baseball tournament
- 1987 NAIA World Series
- 1987 NCAA Division II softball tournament
