= 1998 NAIA World Series =

1998 NAIA baseball tournament
- 1998 NAIA World Series
- Teams: 8
- Format: Double elimination Page playoff
- Finals site: Drillers Stadium; Tulsa, Oklahoma
- Champions: Albertson (1st title)
- Winning coach: Tim Mooney
- MVP: Chris Bradshaw (OF) (Oklahoma City)

The 1998 NAIA World Series was the 42nd annual tournament hosted by the National Association of Intercollegiate Athletics to determine the national champion of baseball among its member colleges and universities in the United States and Canada.

The tournament was played, for the one and only time, at Drillers Stadium in Tulsa, Oklahoma.

Albertson (55–8) defeated Indiana Tech (46–22) in a single-game championship series, 6–3, to win the Coyotes' first NAIA World Series.

Oklahoma City outfielder Chris Bradshaw was named tournament MVP. Bradshaw would be the last player until 2023 to win tournament MVP on a non-championship winning team.

== Bracket ==
First round
Cumberland (TN)	8
Point Park	4
Indiana Tech	11
St. Thomas (FL)	2
Albertson	8
Culver–Stockton	7
Bellevue (NE)	7
Oklahoma City	2

Upper Second Round
Cumberland	4
Indiana Tech	16
Albertson	6
Bellevue	4
Lower Second Round
Culver–Stockton	6
Oklahoma City	9
Point Park	8
St. Thomas	13^{(10)}

Upper Third Round
Indiana Tech	5
Albertson	19
Lower Third Round
Cumberland	3
Oklahoma City	18
Bellevue	16
St. Thomas	8

Semifinals
Albertson	4
Oklahoma City	5
Indiana Tech	7
Bellevue	4

Third place final
Oklahoma City	6
Indiana Tech	8

Championship final
Albertson	6
Indiana Tech	3

== See also ==
- 1998 NCAA Division I baseball tournament
- 1998 NCAA Division II baseball tournament
- 1998 NCAA Division III baseball tournament
- 1998 NAIA Softball World Series
