= Pat Mackey =

Irish Gaelic football selector and former player

Personal information
- Native name: Pádraig Mac Aodha (Irish)
- Born: 1975 (age 50–51) Youghal; County Cork, Ireland
- Height: 6 ft 4 in (193 cm)

Sport
- Sport: Gaelic football
- Position: Goalkeeper
Clubs
- Years: Club
- Youghal → Imokilly
Club titles
- Cork titles: 0
Inter-county
Years	County	Apps (scores)
1997	Cork	0 (0-00)
Inter-county titles
- Munster titles: 0
- All-Irelands: 0
- NFL: 0
- All Stars: 0

Patrick Mackey (born 1975) is an Irish Gaelic football selector and former player. At club level, he played with Youghal, divisional side Imokilly and was also a member of the Cork senior football team.

== Playing career ==
Mackey first played Gaelic football and hurling with the Youghal club at juvenile and underage levels, before progressing to adult level. He claimed his first silverware at adult level in 1999 when Youghal won the East Cork JAFC title. He later won a Cork JAFC medal, following Youghal's 3–08 to 1–13 win over Ilen Rovers in the final. Mackey added a Cork IFC medal to his collection in 2000 when Youghal beat Nemo Rangers in a replay to take the title. He also earned selection to the Imokilly divisional team.

At inter-county level, Mackey first appeared for Cork as sub-goalkeeper on the minor team that won the All-Ireland MFC title in 1993, after a 2-07 to 0-09 win over Meath in the final. He later progressed to the under-21 team and added an All-Ireland U21FC medal to his collection when he was sub-goalkeeper in the defeat of Mayo in the 1994 All-Ireland under-21 final.

Mackey lined out for the senior team during the 1997 season, however, a move to Dublin for work effectively ended his progress with the team. He captained the Cork junior team to the All-Ireland JFC title after a 1–15 to 3–07 win over Mayo in the final.

== Coaching career ==
Mackey became involved in team management and coaching when his playing career ended. He served as a selector with the Cork junior and minor teams at various stages.

== Honours ==
Youghal

- Cork Intermediate Football Championship: 2000
- Cork Junior A Football Championship: 1999
- East Cork Junior A Football Championship: 1999
- Cork Minor B Hurling Championship: 1991

Cork

- All-Ireland Junior Football Championship: 2001 (c)
- Munster Junior Football Championship: 2001 (c)
- All-Ireland Under-21 Football Championship: 1994
- Munster Under-21 Football Championship: 1994
- All-Ireland Minor Football Championship: 1993
- Munster Minor Football Championship: 1993
