= LSU–Shreveport Pilots =

Athletic teams that represent Louisiana State University Shreveport

- University: Louisiana State University Shreveport
- Nickname: Pilots
- NAIA: Division I
- Conference: RRAC (primary)
- Location: Shreveport, Louisiana
- Varsity teams: 6
- Basketball arena: Health and Physical Education Building
- Baseball stadium: Pilot Field
- Soccer stadium: The Swamp
- Colors: Purple and gold
- Mascot: The River Monster
- Website: www.lsusathletics.com
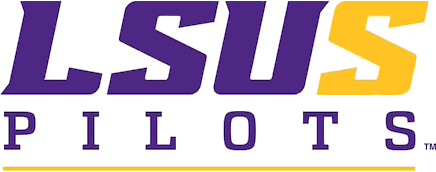

The LSU–Shreveport Pilots (or LSUS Pilots) are the athletic teams that represent Louisiana State University Shreveport, located in Shreveport, Louisiana, in intercollegiate sports as a member of the National Association of Intercollegiate Athletics (NAIA), primarily competing in the Red River Athletic Conference (RRAC) since the 2010–11 academic year. The Pilots previously competed in the Gulf Coast Athletic Conference (GCAC) from 2000–01 to 2009–10.

== Accomplishments ==
The LSU–Shreveport athletic program has produced many championship teams collecting one national championship, nine regular season conference titles, sixteen conference tournament championships, and competed in thirty-one NAIA National Tournaments.

In 2025, the LSU–Shreveport Pilots baseball team became the first team to go undefeated for an entire season in the history of college baseball at any level, winning the school's first national championship in any sport.

== Varsity teams ==
LSUS competes in six intercollegiate varsity sports: Men's sports include baseball, basketball and soccer; while women's sports include basketball, soccer and tennis. Club sports include bass fishing, eSports and weightlifting.

Men's sports	Women's sports	Club sports
Baseball	Basketball	Bass fishing
Basketball	Soccer	Esports
Soccer	Tennis	Weightlifting

=== Baseball ===
The LSU–Shreveport Pilots baseball team competes in NAIA Division I.

==== History ====
The LSU–Shreveport Pilots baseball team held the nation's No. 1 ranking in 2012 and finished with a 54–6 record. The Pilots have been to the Avista-NAIA World series three times under former head coach Rocke Musgraves (2000–2013). Musgraves led the Pilots to a fourth-place finish (2011) and a pair of third-place finishes (2003 & 2012).

In 2025, under head coach Brad Neffendorf (2020–present), the LSU–Shreveport Pilots baseball team became the first team to go undefeated for an entire season in the history of college baseball at any level. The team completed a perfect 59–0 season to win the NAIA National Championship at the Avista NAIA Baseball World Series and in the process now has the longest win streak in college baseball history at any level. The LSU–Shreveport Pilots baseball team beat the Southeastern Fire baseball team representing Southeastern University, 13–7, to capture the program's first national championship at Harris Field in Lewiston, Idaho located on the campus of Lewis–Clark State College.

- Conference Regular Season Titles (5): 2005, 2011, 2012, 2014, 2025
- Conference Tournament Titles (13): 1997, 2006, 2007, 2008, 2010, 2011, 2012, 2013, 2015, 2016, 2017, 2021, 2025
- NAIA Opening Round Appearances (Regional Tournaments): 2003, 2004, 2005, 2006, 2007, 2008, 2009, 2010, 2011, 2012, 2013, 2014, 2015, 2016, 2017, 2021, 2022, 2023, 2025
- NAIA Opening Round Titles: 2011, 2012, 2021, 2022, 2023, 2025
- Avista-NAIA World Series Appearances: 2003, 2011, 2012, 2021, 2022, 2025
- Avista-NAIA World Series National Championships: 2025

The program has had multiple players sign professional contracts and were drafted in the Major League Baseball draft, including three taken in the 2010 MLB draft.

=== Basketball ===
==== Men's ====
The LSU–Shreveport Pilots men's basketball team competes in NAIA Division I. It has become one the top teams in the NAIA since the program was re-instated in 2003. The Pilots have won four regular season titles, seven of the last eight conference tournaments and an even more impressive nine consecutive trips to the NAIA National Tournament in Kansas City. The Pilots have been to the elite eight twice and the Fab Four once.

- Conference Regular Season Titles: 2005, 2006, 2008, 2010, 2014
- Conference Tournament Titles: 2006, 2007, 2008, 2009, 2010, 2011, 2012, 2019
- NAIA National Tournament Appearances: 2005, 2006, 2007, 2008, 2009, 2010, 2011, 2012, 2013, 2014, 2015, 2016, 2017, 2018
- NAIA Fab Four Appearances: 2013
- NAIA Elite Eight Appearances: 2012, 2013

==== Women's ====
The LSU–Shreveport Pilots women's basketball team competes in NAIA Division I. Head coach Curtis Lloyd led the women's basketball team to their first RRAC Tournament Championship in his only season at the helm. National Championship Coach, Matt Cross, took over following Lloyd's departure for the 2017–18 season.

- Conference Tournament Titles: 2017
- Conference Tournament Appearances : 2005, 2006, 2007, 2008, 2009, 2010, 2011, 2012, 2013, 2014, 2015, 2016, 2017
- NAIA National Tournament Appearances: 2009, 2010, 2012, 2013, 2014, 2015, 2016, and 2017

=== Cross Country ===
The LSU–Shreveport men's and women's cross country teams competed in NAIA Division I.

=== Soccer ===
The LSU–Shreveport men's and women's soccer teams compete in NAIA Division I. The soccer program at LSUS began in 1992 with Norm Dolch as the head coach for the men's team. By 2005, women's soccer came on board under the direction of Coach Jed Jones. In 2013, the program was cut due to budget constraints enacted by the state. Both the men's and women's programs were reinstated 2017.

==== Men's ====
Men's Soccer: Head Coach Phillip Bohn

- Conference Tournament Appearances: 2009, 2010, 2012

==== Women's ====
Women's Soccer: Head Coach Ashley Holland

- Conference Regular Season Championship: 2006
- Regional Tournament Qualifiers: 2005, 2007

=== Women's tennis ===
The LSU–Shreveport women's tennis team competes in the NAIA as an Independent.

== Athletic facilities ==
Health and Physical Education Building
The Health and Physical Education Building on the campus of LSUS includes The Dock, a 1,000-seat gymnasium and home to the LSUS men's and women's basketball teams. The gymnasium is also used for high school basketball games, gymnastics meets and weightlifting competitions. The Health and Physical Education Building also includes the USA Weightlifting High Performance and Development Center which is home to the LSUS weightlifting team, the LSUS Natatorium that houses a six lane lap pool, five racquetball courts and an indoor track. Located adjacent to the building and part of the complex are eight tennis courts.

Pilot Field
Pilot Field is a baseball stadium located on the campus of LSUS. It is home to the LSUS baseball team. It opened on February 17, 1994, and includes an indoor hitting facility, locker room, meeting room and coaches offices.

The Swamp
The Swamp located on the campus of LSUS is the home of the men's and women's soccer teams. The facility includes a locker room for the teams.

== Non-varsity/club sports ==
=== Bass Fishing ===
The bass fishing team at LSUS started in 2008, and it competes in the Collegiate Bass Fishing Association with its first competition at Lake Lewisville in Texas.

- 2nd Place in the 2011 National Guard FLW College Fishing National Championships
- 2nd place in the 2016 Association of Collegiate Anglers Nationals
- 2nd place in the 2016 Carhartt Bassmaster Wildcard Collegiate Tournament
- 5th place in the 2016 Bass Collegiate National Championship
- 1st place in the 2017 Yeti College Tournament

=== Weightlifting ===
The weightlifting team at LSUS uses the USA Weightlifting Center for High Performance and Development, commissioned by the U.S. Olympic Committee on February 4, 1998, located in the Health and Physical Education building. The program is under the direction of Dr. Kyle Pierce, an associate professor of kinesiology at LSUS.

Notable team members are:

- Dawn List - set three Women's National Collegiate records for her weight class in 1991.
- Derrick Johnson - recipient of three junior national weightlifting records in 2004.
- Kendrick Farris - represented the U.S. in 2008, 2012, and 2016 at the Summer Olympics.

== See also ==
- Red River Athletic Conference
- National Association of Intercollegiate Athletics
