= Reinhardt Eagles =

- University: Reinhardt University
- Association: NAIA
- Conference: AAC (primary)
- Athletic director: Jeffrey Pourchier
- Location: Waleska, Georgia
- Varsity teams: 23 (11 men's, 10 women's, 2 co-ed)
- Football stadium: Ken White Field at University Stadium
- Basketball arena: Brown Athletic Center
- Baseball stadium: Ken White Baseball Field
- Softball stadium: Ken White Softball Field
- Soccer stadium: Ken White Field at University Stadium
- Lacrosse stadium: Ken White Field at University Stadium
- Mascot: SOAR, The Eagle
- Nickname: Eagles
- Colors: Navy and gold
- Website: www.reinhardteagles.com
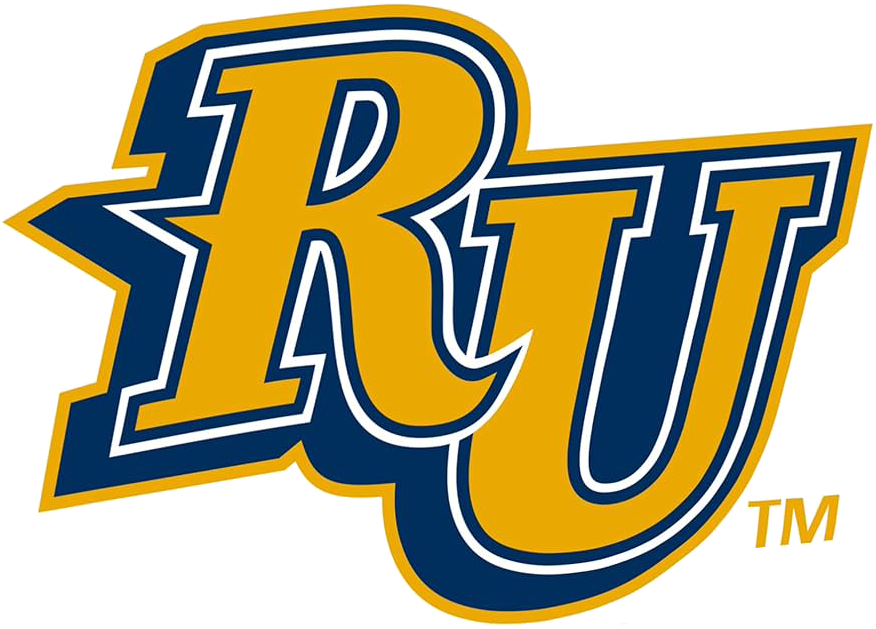

The Reinhardt Eagles are the athletic teams that represent Reinhardt University, located in Waleska, Georgia, in intercollegiate sports as a member of the National Association of Intercollegiate Athletics (NAIA), primarily competing in the Appalachian Athletic Conference (AAC) since the 2009–10 academic year. They were also a member of the National Christian College Athletic Association (NCCAA), primarily competing as an independent in the South Region of the Division I level from 1999–2000 to 2000–01. The Eagles previously competed in the Southern States Athletic Conference (SSAC; formerly known as Georgia–Alabama–Carolina Conference (GACC) until after the 2003–04 school year) from 2000–01 (when they joined the NAIA) to 2008–09. Prior joining the NAIA, Reinhardt was also a member of the National Junior College Athletic Association (NJCAA) and of the National Small College Athletic Association (NSCAA) until after the 1998–99 school year.

== Conference affiliations ==
NJCAA

- National Small College Athletic Association

NAIA

- Southern States Athletic Conference (2000–2009)
- Appalachian Athletic Conference (2009–present)

== Varsity teams ==
Reinhardt competes in 24 intercollegiate varsity sports:

Men's sports	Women's sports
Baseball	Basketball
Basketball	Cross country
Cross country	Flag football
Football	Golf
Golf	Lacrosse
Lacrosse	Soccer
Soccer	Softball
Track and field^{1}	Track and field^{1}
Volleyball	Volleyball
Wrestling	
^{1} – include both indoor and outdoor

=== Football ===
After dropping their football program in 1920, Reinhardt revived football in 2013 as a member of the Mid-South Conference (MSC).

== Accomplishments ==
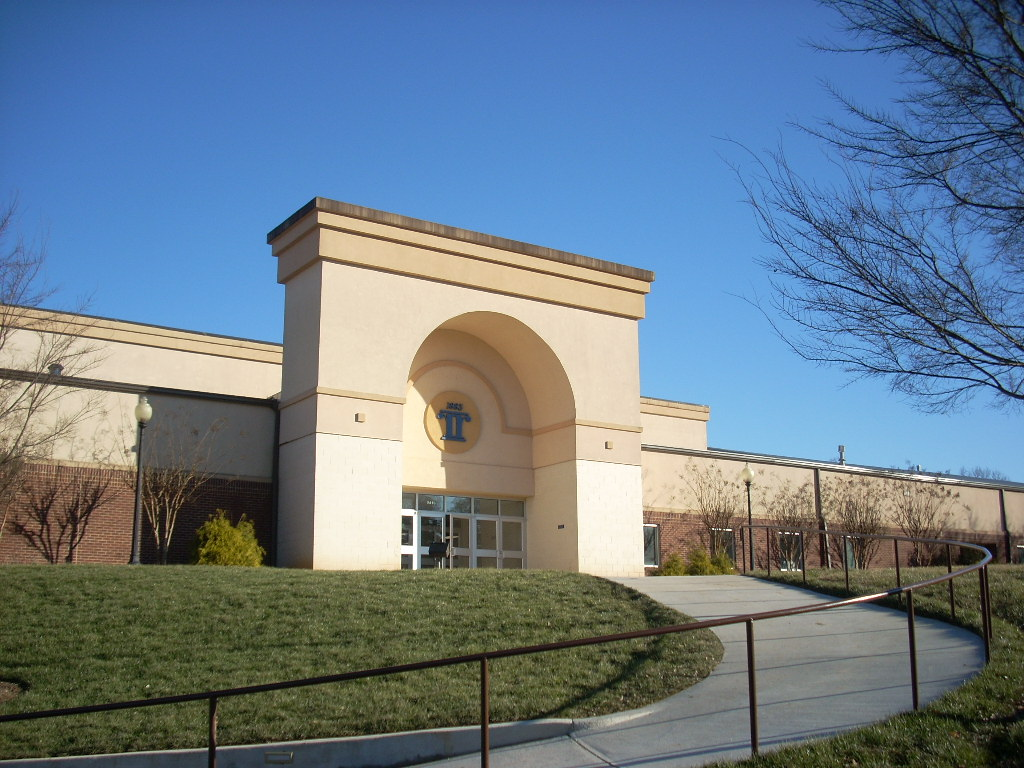
John Rollins Wellness Complex

In 2010, Reinhardt University's Drew Tyson became the first baseball player drafted by the Oakland Athletics, in the 17th round of the MLB draft. In 2014, Reinhardt was invited to the NAIA Men's basketball national tournament for the first time since 2004, when the team won a conference championship for the second consecutive year.

The RU men's lacrosse team won their third-straight NAIA National Invitational Tournament championship in 2019.
