= 2026 NAIA baseball tournament =

Collegiate baseball tournament

- Teams: 46
- Finals site: Harris Field; Lewiston, Idaho
- Champions: Tennessee Wesleyan (3rd title)
- Winning coach: Billy Barry
- MVP: Allan Gil Fernandez (Tennessee Wesleyan)

The 2026 NAIA baseball tournament was the 69th edition of the NAIA baseball championship. The 46-team tournament began on May 11 with Opening Round games across ten different sites and concludes with the 2026 NAIA World Series in Lewiston, Idaho that started on May 22 and concluded a week later on May 30.

Tennessee Wesleyan won their 3rd national championship as they beat top-seeded Taylor (IN) 21–3 in the championship game. Tennessee Wesleyan's 18-run victory was the largest margin of victory in a championship game and their 22 hits was the most since 1958. Allan Gil Fernandez of Tennessee Wesleyan was named tournament MVP.

The 46 participating teams were selected from all eligible NAIA teams. The World Series host and 30 teams were awarded automatic bids as either champions and/or runners-up of their conferences, and 15 teams were selected at-large by the National Selection Committee. Teams were then placed into one of ten pre-determined Opening Round sites, with six sites consisting of five teams and four sites consisting of four teams, each of which is conducted via a double-elimination tournament. The winners of each of the Opening Round sites will advance to the NAIA World Series.

== Tournament procedure ==
A total of 46 teams entered the tournament, with Lewis–Clark State receiving an automatic bid into the Opening Round as World Series host. 30 automatic bids were determined by either winning their conference's regular season championship, conference tournament, and/or conference tournament runner-up. The other 15 bids were at-large, with selections determined by the NAIA Baseball National Selection Committee.

== Opening round hosts ==
On May 1, the NAIA announced the ten opening round host sites, which are being played from May 11–14.

Opening Round hosts

Venue	Location	Host
Hunter Wright Stadium	Kingsport, TN	Appalachian Athletic Conference
Renner Dennis Outdoor Athletic Complex	Bellevue, NE	Bellevue University
Doyle Buhl Stadium	Williamsburg, KY	University of the Cumberlands
Sherman Field	Lincoln, NE	Doane University
Grizzly Baseball Complex	Lawrenceville, GA	Georgia Gwinnett College
Dean Evans Stadium	Salina, KS	Kansas Wesleyan University
Harris Field	Lewiston, ID	Lewis-Clark State College
Pilot Field	Shreveport, LA	Louisiana State University Shreveport
Ted A. Broer Stadium	Lakeland, FL	Southeastern University
Winterholter Field	Upland, IN	Taylor University

== Bids ==
=== Automatic ===
School	Conference	Record	Berth	Last NAIA Appearance
Abraham Baldwin (GA)	Southern States	39–15	Tournament runner-up	2025 (Lakeland Bracket)
Bellevue (NE)	Frontier	48–4	Tournament champion	2025 (Upland Bracket)
British Columbia	Cascade	38–15	Tournament runner-up	2025 NAIA World Series
Bryan (TN)	Appalachian	27–24	Tournament runner-up	2023 (Kingsport Bracket)
Central Baptist (AR)	American Midwest	34–18	Tournament champion	2016 (Montgomery Bracket)
Concordia (NE)	Great Plains	37–16	Tournament runner-up	2025 (Lincoln Bracket)
Cumberlands (KY)	Mid-South	46–8	Tournament champion	2025 NAIA World Series
Doane (NE)	Great Plains	44–9	Regular season champion	2024 (Lincoln Bracket)
Georgia Gwinnett	Continental	46–6	Tournament champion	2025 NAIA World Series
Hope International (CA)	Great Southwest	37–13	Tournament champion	2025 NAIA World Series
Huston–Tillotson (TX)	HBCU	33–18	Tournament runner-up	First appearance
Indiana Wesleyan	Crossroads	34–22	Tournament runner-up	2025 (Lincoln Bracket)
IU Southeast	River States	39–14	Regular season champion	2025 (Hattiesburg Bracket)
Kansas Wesleyan	Kansas	48–7	Regular season champion	2025 (Upland Bracket)
Lewis-Clark State (ID)	Cascade	41–7	World Series host	2025 (Lewiston Bracket)
Loyola (LA)	Southern States	36–17	Tournament champion	2025 NAIA World Series
LSU–Shreveport	Red River	41–12	Tournament champion	2025 NAIA World Series
Madonna (MI)	Wolverine-Hoosier	41–14	Tournament champion	2023 (Fayette Bracket)
Mid-America Christian (OK)	Sooner	39–13	Tournament champion	2025 (Shreveport Bracket)
Mount Mercy (IA)	Heart	38–13	Tournament champion	2024 (Lincoln Bracket)
Northwestern Ohio	Wolverine-Hoosier	36–16	Regular season champion	2025 (Williamsburg Bracket)
Oklahoma Wesleyan	Kansas	36–17	Tournament runner-up	2025 (Hattiesburg Bracket)
Shawnee State (OH)	River States	32–18	Tournament runner-up	2011 (Cleveland Bracket)
Southeastern (FL)	The Sun	39–15	Tournament champion	2025 NAIA World Series
St. Ambrose (IA)	Chicagoland	32–20	Tournament champion	2017 (Bartlesville Bracket)
Talladega (AL)	HBCU	32–17	Tournament champion	2025 (Lawrenceville Bracket)
Taylor (IN)	Crossroads	49–5	Regular season champion	2025 (Upland Bracket)
Tennessee Wesleyan	Appalachian	40–14	Tournament champion	2025 NAIA World Series
Texas A&M–Victoria (Note: Texas A&M–Victoria was known as University of Houston–Victoria (UH-Victoria) when they made their last Opening Round appearance.)	Red River	36–15	Regular season champion	2025 (Lawrenceville Bracket)
Texas Wesleyan	Sooner	41–10	Regular season champion	2023 (Hattiesburg Bracket)
William Woods (MO)	Heart	29–21	Tournament runner-up	2015 (Bellevue Bracket)

=== At–Large ===
School	Conference	Record	Last NAIA Appearance
Faulkner (AL)	Southern States	30–22	2024 (Lawrenceville Bracket)
Huntington (IN)	Crossroads	39–12	2019 (Macon Bracket)
Indiana Tech	Wolverine-Hoosier	41–15	2025 (Kingsport Bracket)
Johnson (TN)	Appalachian	37–12	2025 (Shreveport Bracket)
Keiser (FL)	The Sun	35–17	2025 (Lawrenceville Bracket)
Louisiana Christian	Red River	35–13	2025 (Kingsport Bracket)
LSU–Alexandria	Red River	33–15	2022 (Oklahoma City Bracket)
Marian (IN)	Crossroads	35–16	2019 (Kingsport Bracket)
Milligan (TN)	Appalachian	40–13	2024 (Hattiesburg Bracket)
Missouri Baptist	Heart	39–10	2025 (Williamsburg Bracket)
Nelson (TX)	Sooner	35–18	First appearance
Oakland City (IN)	River States	39–13	2025 (Waleska Bracket)
Our Lady of the Lake (TX)	Red River	34–18	2019 (Montgomery Bracket)
Webber International (FL)	The Sun	37–17	2025 NAIA World Series
William Carey (MS)	Southern States	35–18	2025 (Hattiesburg Bracket)

== Opening Round ==
All game times are listed in local time.

=== Bellevue Bracket ===
Hosted by Bellevue University at Renner Dennis Outdoor Athletic Complex

==== Bracket ====
First Round
4	Nelson (TX)	8
5	St. Ambrose (IA)	1
First Elimination Game
5	St. Ambrose (IA)	8
3	Huntington (IN)	7

Second Round
1	Bellevue (NE)	6
4	Nelson (TX)	9
2	IU Southeast	17^{(7)}
3	Huntington (IN)	7
Second Elimination Game
1	Bellevue (NE)	11^{(8)}
5	St. Ambrose (IA)	1

Semifinal
4	Nelson (TX)	3
2	IU Southeast	6^{(13)}
Third Elimination Game
4	Nelson (TX)	2
1	Bellevue (NE)	3

Championship
2	IU Southeast	3	–
1	Bellevue (NE)	1	–

==== Results ====
Monday, May 11; 11:00 am CDT; Game 1	(5) St. Ambrose (IA)	1–8	(4) Nelson (TX)	Renner Dennis Outdoor Athletic Complex; Attendance: 195; Umpires: HP: Chad Metzger, 1B: Matt Sisk, 2B: Ryan Storck, 3B: Blayne Murphy
Monday, May 11; 11:00 am CDT; Game 1	LP: Dominic Guzman (8–2)	Boxscore	WP: Reagan Smith (10–2); Sv: Hamilton Moye (2)	Renner Dennis Outdoor Athletic Complex; Attendance: 195; Umpires: HP: Chad Metzger, 1B: Matt Sisk, 2B: Ryan Storck, 3B: Blayne Murphy
Monday, May 11; 11:00 am CDT; Game 1		Boxscore	HR: Addison Patton (5)	Renner Dennis Outdoor Athletic Complex; Attendance: 195; Umpires: HP: Chad Metzger, 1B: Matt Sisk, 2B: Ryan Storck, 3B: Blayne Murphy

Monday, May 11; 2:30 pm CDT; Game 2	(3) Huntington (IN)	7–17 (F/7)	(2) IU Southeast	Renner Dennis Outdoor Athletic Complex; Attendance: 236; Umpires: HP: Rex Engstrand, 1B: Joe Cassidy, 2B: James Carroll, 3B: Connor Singhisen
Monday, May 11; 2:30 pm CDT; Game 2	LP: Max Engle (9–2)	Boxscore	WP: Brendan Whalen (9–0)	Renner Dennis Outdoor Athletic Complex; Attendance: 236; Umpires: HP: Rex Engstrand, 1B: Joe Cassidy, 2B: James Carroll, 3B: Connor Singhisen
Monday, May 11; 2:30 pm CDT; Game 2	HR: Jace Fowler (7), Deklan Thompson (4)	Boxscore	HR: Coulter Hamilton (12), Trevor Goodwin (10), Caden Lockwood (12), Alex Schuler (4)	Renner Dennis Outdoor Athletic Complex; Attendance: 236; Umpires: HP: Rex Engstrand, 1B: Joe Cassidy, 2B: James Carroll, 3B: Connor Singhisen

Monday, May 11; 6:00 pm CDT; Game 3	(4) Nelson (TX)	9–6	(1) Bellevue (NE)	Renner Dennis Outdoor Athletic Complex; Attendance: 307; Umpires: HP: Matt Sisk, 1B: Ryan Storck, 2B: Blayne Muprhy, 3B: Chad Metzger
Monday, May 11; 6:00 pm CDT; Game 3	WP: Cash Eckermann (2–2)	Boxscore	LP: Reid Madariaga (6–1)	Renner Dennis Outdoor Athletic Complex; Attendance: 307; Umpires: HP: Matt Sisk, 1B: Ryan Storck, 2B: Blayne Muprhy, 3B: Chad Metzger
Monday, May 11; 6:00 pm CDT; Game 3	HR: Diego Arcay (7)	Boxscore	HR: Carter Claerhout (28)	Renner Dennis Outdoor Athletic Complex; Attendance: 307; Umpires: HP: Matt Sisk, 1B: Ryan Storck, 2B: Blayne Muprhy, 3B: Chad Metzger

Tuesday, May 12; 11:00 am CDT; Game 4	(5) St. Ambrose (IA)	8–7	(3) Huntington (IN)	Renner Dennis Outdoor Athletic Complex; Attendance: 172; Umpires: HP: Joe Cassidy, 1B: James Carroll, 2B: Connor Singhisen, 3B: Rex Engstrand
Tuesday, May 12; 11:00 am CDT; Game 4	WP: Noah Chase (5–1)	Boxscore	LP: RJ Anglin (6–3)	Renner Dennis Outdoor Athletic Complex; Attendance: 172; Umpires: HP: Joe Cassidy, 1B: James Carroll, 2B: Connor Singhisen, 3B: Rex Engstrand
Tuesday, May 12; 11:00 am CDT; Game 4	HR: Bryce Vorwald (7), Eric Gonzalez (4), Michael Rago (5)	Boxscore	HR: Owen Willard (19), Tanner Reinartz (15)	Renner Dennis Outdoor Athletic Complex; Attendance: 172; Umpires: HP: Joe Cassidy, 1B: James Carroll, 2B: Connor Singhisen, 3B: Rex Engstrand

Tuesday, May 12; 2:30 pm CDT; Game 5	(2) IU Southeast	6–3 (F/13)	(4) Nelson (TX)	Renner Dennis Outdoor Athletic Complex; Attendance: 228; Umpires: HP: Ryan Storck, 1B: Blayne Murphy, 2B: Chad Metzger, 3B: Matt Sisk
Tuesday, May 12; 2:30 pm CDT; Game 5	WP: Jake Gothrup (4–2)	Boxscore	LP: Dylan Zajicek (3–4)	Renner Dennis Outdoor Athletic Complex; Attendance: 228; Umpires: HP: Ryan Storck, 1B: Blayne Murphy, 2B: Chad Metzger, 3B: Matt Sisk
Tuesday, May 12; 2:30 pm CDT; Game 5	HR: Trevor Goodwin (11)	Boxscore		Renner Dennis Outdoor Athletic Complex; Attendance: 228; Umpires: HP: Ryan Storck, 1B: Blayne Murphy, 2B: Chad Metzger, 3B: Matt Sisk

Tuesday, May 12; 6:00 pm CDT; Game 6	(1) Bellevue (NE)	11–1 (F/8)	(5) St. Ambrose (IA)	Renner Dennis Outdoor Athletic Complex; Attendance: 277; Umpires: HP: James Carroll, 1B: Connor Singhisen, 2B: Rex Engstrand, 3B: Joe Cassidy
Tuesday, May 12; 6:00 pm CDT; Game 6	WP: Kody Butt (8–1)	Boxscore	LP: Aidan Pieniazek (2–2)	Renner Dennis Outdoor Athletic Complex; Attendance: 277; Umpires: HP: James Carroll, 1B: Connor Singhisen, 2B: Rex Engstrand, 3B: Joe Cassidy
Tuesday, May 12; 6:00 pm CDT; Game 6	HR: Carter Claerhout (29), Dylan Holmes (14)	Boxscore		Renner Dennis Outdoor Athletic Complex; Attendance: 277; Umpires: HP: James Carroll, 1B: Connor Singhisen, 2B: Rex Engstrand, 3B: Joe Cassidy

Wednesday, May 13; 12:00 pm CDT; Game 7	(4) Nelson (TX)	2–3	(1) Bellevue (NE)	Renner Dennis Outdoor Athletic Complex; Attendance: 210; Umpires: HP: Blayne Murphy, 1B: Chad Metzger, 2B: Matt Sisk, 3B: Ryan Storck
Wednesday, May 13; 12:00 pm CDT; Game 7	LP: Neco Lopez (4–4)	Boxscore	WP: Brayden Andersen (11–1); Sv: Brody Burnette (15)	Renner Dennis Outdoor Athletic Complex; Attendance: 210; Umpires: HP: Blayne Murphy, 1B: Chad Metzger, 2B: Matt Sisk, 3B: Ryan Storck

Wednesday, May 13; 3:30 pm CDT; Game 8	(1) Bellevue (NE)	1–3	(2) IU Southeast	Renner Dennis Outdoor Athletic Complex; Attendance: 302; Umpires: HP: Connor Singhisen, 1B: Rex Engstrand, 2B: Joe Cassidy, 3B: James Carroll
Wednesday, May 13; 3:30 pm CDT; Game 8	LP: Brody Burnette (2–1)	Boxscore	WP: Aiden Darlage (7–0)	Renner Dennis Outdoor Athletic Complex; Attendance: 302; Umpires: HP: Connor Singhisen, 1B: Rex Engstrand, 2B: Joe Cassidy, 3B: James Carroll
Wednesday, May 13; 3:30 pm CDT; Game 8	HR: Dylan Holmes (15)	Boxscore	HR: Kasen Parks (4)	Renner Dennis Outdoor Athletic Complex; Attendance: 302; Umpires: HP: Connor Singhisen, 1B: Rex Engstrand, 2B: Joe Cassidy, 3B: James Carroll

=== Kingsport Bracket ===
Hosted by the Appalachian Athletic Conference at Hunter Wright Stadium

==== Bracket ====
First Round
4	Indiana Wesleyan	5
5	William Woods (MO)	0
First Elimination Game
5	William Woods (MO)	4
3	LSU–Alexandria	7

Second Round
1	Webber International (FL)	6
4	Indiana Wesleyan	10
2	Tennessee Wesleyan	7
3	LSU–Alexandria	0
Second Elimination Game
1	Webber International (FL)	9
3	LSU–Alexandria	0

Semifinal
4	Indiana Wesleyan	0
2	Tennessee Wesleyan	8
Third Elimination Game
4	Indiana Wesleyan	6
1	Webber International (FL)	8

Championship
2	Tennessee Wesleyan	9	–
1	Webber International (FL)	1	–

==== Results ====
Monday, May 11; 11:00 am EDT; Game 1	(5) William Woods (MO)	0–5	(4) Indiana Wesleyan	Hunter Wright Stadium; Attendance: 111
Monday, May 11; 11:00 am EDT; Game 1	LP: AJ Vasquez (5–4)	Boxscore	WP: Kevin Corcoran (5–4)	Hunter Wright Stadium; Attendance: 111

Monday, May 11; 2:30 pm EDT; Game 2	(3) LSU–Alexandria	0–7	(2) Tennessee Wesleyan	Hunter Wright Stadium; Attendance: 122
Monday, May 11; 2:30 pm EDT; Game 2	LP: Carter Fabre (8–3)	Boxscore	WP: Justin Jackson (11–1)	Hunter Wright Stadium; Attendance: 122
Monday, May 11; 2:30 pm EDT; Game 2		Boxscore	HR: Allan Gil Fernandez (12), Josh Shelly (13), Thomas Teel (2)	Hunter Wright Stadium; Attendance: 122

Monday, May 11; 6:00 pm EDT; Game 3	(4) Indiana Wesleyan	10–6	(1) Webber International (FL)	Hunter Wright Stadium; Attendance: 101
Monday, May 11; 6:00 pm EDT; Game 3	WP: Noah Wathen (7–3)	Boxscore	LP: Jalen Martinez (1–2)	Hunter Wright Stadium; Attendance: 101
Monday, May 11; 6:00 pm EDT; Game 3	HR: Nick Wiley (20)	Boxscore		Hunter Wright Stadium; Attendance: 101

Tuesday, May 12; 11:00 am EDT; Game 4	(5) William Woods (MO)	4–7	(3) LSU–Alexandria	Hunter Wright Stadium; Attendance: 100
Tuesday, May 12; 11:00 am EDT; Game 4	LP: Brayden Groseclose (7–3)	Boxscore	WP: Colin Ardoin (3–0); Sv: Eli Finley (2)	Hunter Wright Stadium; Attendance: 100
Tuesday, May 12; 11:00 am EDT; Game 4		Boxscore	HR: Dalton Wilson (7), Joshua Tinnerello (2)	Hunter Wright Stadium; Attendance: 100

Tuesday, May 12; 2:30 pm EDT; Game 5	(2) Tennessee Wesleyan	8–0	(4) Indiana Wesleyan	Hunter Wright Stadium; Attendance: 111
Tuesday, May 12; 2:30 pm EDT; Game 5	WP: Cameron Goffar (9–2)	Boxscore	LP: Cooper Chinn (4–5)	Hunter Wright Stadium; Attendance: 111
Tuesday, May 12; 2:30 pm EDT; Game 5	HR: Josh Shelly (14), David Ballenilla (6)	Boxscore		Hunter Wright Stadium; Attendance: 111

Tuesday, May 12; 6:00 pm EDT; Game 6	(1) Webber International (FL)	9–0	(3) LSU–Alexandria	Hunter Wright Stadium; Attendance: 123
Tuesday, May 12; 6:00 pm EDT; Game 6	WP: Mason Veronezi (9–1)	Boxscore	LP: Michael Sutton (8–5)	Hunter Wright Stadium; Attendance: 123
Tuesday, May 12; 6:00 pm EDT; Game 6	HR: Tugg Hollandsworth (5), Jalen Martinez (5)	Boxscore		Hunter Wright Stadium; Attendance: 123

Wednesday, May 13; 11:00 am EDT; Game 7	(4) Indiana Wesleyan	6–8	(1) Webber International (FL)	Hunter Wright Stadium; Attendance: 137
Wednesday, May 13; 11:00 am EDT; Game 7	LP: Zach Troxel (2–2)	Boxscore	WP: Zach Hessler (5–2)	Hunter Wright Stadium; Attendance: 137

Wednesday, May 13; 2:30 pm EDT; Game 8	(1) Webber International (FL)	1–9	(2) Tennessee Wesleyan	Hunter Wright Stadium; Attendance: 145
Wednesday, May 13; 2:30 pm EDT; Game 8	LP: Ryan Franklin (1–5)	Boxscore	WP: McGwire Taylor (9–2)	Hunter Wright Stadium; Attendance: 145
Wednesday, May 13; 2:30 pm EDT; Game 8		Boxscore	HR: Kolton Reynolds (15), Cody McGill (4)	Hunter Wright Stadium; Attendance: 145

=== Lakeland Bracket ===
Hosted by Southeastern University at Ted A. Broer Stadium

==== Bracket ====
First Round
1	Southeastern (FL)	8
4	Faulkner (AL)	7
2	Milligan (TN)	4
3	British Columbia	6
First Elimination Game
4	Faulkner (AL)	9
2	Milligan (TN)	14

Semifinal
1	Southeastern (FL)	1
3	British Columbia	11^{(8)}
Second Elimination Game
1	Southeastern (FL)	15^{(7)}
2	Milligan (TN)	0

Championship
3	British Columbia	3	2
1	Southeastern (FL)	12	7

==== Results ====
Monday, May 11; 2:30 pm EDT; Game 1	(3) British Columbia	6–4	(2) Milligan (TN)	Ted A. Broer Stadium; Umpires: HP: Casey Sanchez, 1B: Shane LeBoyd, 2B: Brian Bernard, 3B: Chay Stout
Monday, May 11; 2:30 pm EDT; Game 1	WP: Will Anderson (6–4); Sv: Lucas Huynh (7)	Boxscore	LP: Canyon Geren (9–2)	Ted A. Broer Stadium; Umpires: HP: Casey Sanchez, 1B: Shane LeBoyd, 2B: Brian Bernard, 3B: Chay Stout

Monday, May 11; 6:00 pm EDT; Game 2	(4) Faulkner (AL)	7–8	(1) Southeastern (FL)	Ted A. Broer Stadium; Umpires: HP: John Dowdy, 1B: Brian Bernard, 2B: Chay Stout, 3B; Gary Glover
Monday, May 11; 6:00 pm EDT; Game 2	LP: Samir Rojas (6–3)	Boxscore	WP: Parker Lambeth (3–1); Sv: Brody McMullen (3)	Ted A. Broer Stadium; Umpires: HP: John Dowdy, 1B: Brian Bernard, 2B: Chay Stout, 3B; Gary Glover
Monday, May 11; 6:00 pm EDT; Game 2		Boxscore	HR: Armani Cozza (5)	Ted A. Broer Stadium; Umpires: HP: John Dowdy, 1B: Brian Bernard, 2B: Chay Stout, 3B; Gary Glover

Tuesday, May 12; 11:00 am EDT; Game 3	(2) Milligan (TN)	14–9	(4) Faulkner (AL)	Ted A. Broer Stadium
Tuesday, May 12; 11:00 am EDT; Game 3	WP: Jack McLaury (9–3)	Boxscore	LP: Brandon Napier (4–4)	Ted A. Broer Stadium
Tuesday, May 12; 11:00 am EDT; Game 3	HR: Cade Kalehuawehe (7), Brody Melton (8), Reagan Smith (5)	Boxscore	HR: Edrien Martínez 2 (19), Jimmy Perez (4), Anthony Bassett Torres (3)	Ted A. Broer Stadium

Tuesday, May 12; 6:30 pm EDT; Game 4	(1) Southeastern (FL)	1–11 (F/8)	(3) British Columbia	Ted A. Broer Stadium; Umpires: HP: Brian Bernard, 1B: Gary Glover, 2B: Casey Sanchez, 3B: John Dowdy
Tuesday, May 12; 6:30 pm EDT; Game 4	LP: Austin Peddycoart (5–2)	Boxscore	WP: Myles Chamberlain (11–1)	Ted A. Broer Stadium; Umpires: HP: Brian Bernard, 1B: Gary Glover, 2B: Casey Sanchez, 3B: John Dowdy
Tuesday, May 12; 6:30 pm EDT; Game 4		Boxscore	HR: David Krahn 2 (10), Josh Cote (13)	Ted A. Broer Stadium; Umpires: HP: Brian Bernard, 1B: Gary Glover, 2B: Casey Sanchez, 3B: John Dowdy

Wednesday, May 13; 2:30 pm EDT; Game 5	(1) Southeastern (FL)	15–0 (F/7)	(2) Milligan (TN)	Ted A. Broer Stadium; Umpires: HP: Chay Stout, 1B: Casey Sanchez, 2B: John Dowdy, 3B: Shane LeBoyd
Wednesday, May 13; 2:30 pm EDT; Game 5	WP: Byler Reither (9–2)	Boxscore	LP: Jonah Ward (8–3)	Ted A. Broer Stadium; Umpires: HP: Chay Stout, 1B: Casey Sanchez, 2B: John Dowdy, 3B: Shane LeBoyd
Wednesday, May 13; 2:30 pm EDT; Game 5	HR: Cooper Ciesielski (11), Charlie Collins (7)	Boxscore		Ted A. Broer Stadium; Umpires: HP: Chay Stout, 1B: Casey Sanchez, 2B: John Dowdy, 3B: Shane LeBoyd

Wednesday, May 13; 6:00 pm EDT; Game 6	(3) British Columbia	3–12	(1) Southeastern (FL)	Ted A. Broer Stadium; Umpires: HP: Gary Glover, 1B: John Dowdy, 2B: Shane LeBoyd, 3B: Brian Bernard
Wednesday, May 13; 6:00 pm EDT; Game 6	LP: James Brock (9–4)	Boxscore	WP: Blake Albritton (6–2)	Ted A. Broer Stadium; Umpires: HP: Gary Glover, 1B: John Dowdy, 2B: Shane LeBoyd, 3B: Brian Bernard
Wednesday, May 13; 6:00 pm EDT; Game 6		Boxscore	HR: Cort Pryor (4)	Ted A. Broer Stadium; Umpires: HP: Gary Glover, 1B: John Dowdy, 2B: Shane LeBoyd, 3B: Brian Bernard

Thursday, May 14; 12:00 pm EDT; Game 7	(1) Southeastern (FL)	7–2	(3) British Columbia	Ted A. Broer Stadium
Thursday, May 14; 12:00 pm EDT; Game 7	WP: Brody McMullen (3–1)	Boxscore	LP: Linden Happell (3–1)	Ted A. Broer Stadium
Thursday, May 14; 12:00 pm EDT; Game 7	HR: Armani Cozza (6), Jace Essig (5)	Boxscore	HR: Josh Cote (14)	Ted A. Broer Stadium

=== Lawrenceville Bracket ===
Hosted by Georgia Gwinnett College at Grizzly Baseball Complex

==== Bracket ====
First Round
4	Northwestern Ohio	2
5	Talladega (AL)	12^{(7)}
First Elimination Game
4	Northwestern Ohio	1
3	Marian (IN)	0

Second Round
1	Georgia Gwinnett	11^{(7)}
5	Talladega (AL)	1
2	Louisiana Christian	4
3	Marian (IN)	3
Second Elimination Game
5	Talladega (AL)	5
4	Northwestern Ohio	9

Semifinal
1	Georgia Gwinnett	12
2	Louisiana Christian	6
Third Elimination Game
2	Louisiana Christian	16^{(7)}
4	Northwestern Ohio	3

Championship
1	Georgia Gwinnett	12	–
2	Louisiana Christian	4	–

==== Results ====
Monday, May 11; 11:00 am EDT; Game 1	(5) Talladega (AL)	12–2 (F/7)	(4) Northwestern Ohio	Grizzly Baseball Complex; Attendance: 155; Umpires: HP: John Walrath, 1B: Jackie Halstead, 2B: Craig Hammer, 3B: Pat Gentry
Monday, May 11; 11:00 am EDT; Game 1	WP: Diego Duque (8–3)	Boxscore	LP: Daniel Healy (10–2)	Grizzly Baseball Complex; Attendance: 155; Umpires: HP: John Walrath, 1B: Jackie Halstead, 2B: Craig Hammer, 3B: Pat Gentry

Monday, May 11; 3:00 pm EDT; Game 2	(3) Marian (IN)	3–4	(2) Louisiana Christian	Grizzly Baseball Complex; Attendance: 179; Umpires: HP: Nick Reynolds, 1B: Matt Hunter, 2B: Chris Schwarzer, 3B: Van Lewsader
Monday, May 11; 3:00 pm EDT; Game 2	LP: Jack Peine (1–3)	Boxscore	WP: Owen Simoneaux (5–1)	Grizzly Baseball Complex; Attendance: 179; Umpires: HP: Nick Reynolds, 1B: Matt Hunter, 2B: Chris Schwarzer, 3B: Van Lewsader
Monday, May 11; 3:00 pm EDT; Game 2		Boxscore	HR: Matthew Cody (4), Gavin Vordick (4)	Grizzly Baseball Complex; Attendance: 179; Umpires: HP: Nick Reynolds, 1B: Matt Hunter, 2B: Chris Schwarzer, 3B: Van Lewsader

Monday, May 11; 7:00 pm EDT; Game 3	(5) Talladega (AL)	1–11 (F/7)	(1) Georgia Gwinnett	Grizzly Baseball Complex; Attendance: 285; Umpires: HP: Jackie Halstead, 1B: Craig Hammer, 2B: Pat Gentry, 3B: John Walrath
Monday, May 11; 7:00 pm EDT; Game 3	LP: Dewinel Vazquez Oquendo (4–4)	Boxscore	WP: Shane Anderson (8–0)	Grizzly Baseball Complex; Attendance: 285; Umpires: HP: Jackie Halstead, 1B: Craig Hammer, 2B: Pat Gentry, 3B: John Walrath

Tuesday, May 12; 11:00 am EDT; Game 4	(4) Northwestern Ohio	1–0	(3) Marian (IN)	Grizzly Baseball Complex; Attendance: 175; Umpires: HP: Matt Hunter, 1B: Chris Schwarzer, 2B: Van Lewsader, 3B: Nick Reynolds
Tuesday, May 12; 11:00 am EDT; Game 4	WP: Ryan Yingst (3–0); Sv: Noah Curi (1)	Boxscore	LP: Kaeb Stebbins (5–2)	Grizzly Baseball Complex; Attendance: 175; Umpires: HP: Matt Hunter, 1B: Chris Schwarzer, 2B: Van Lewsader, 3B: Nick Reynolds

Tuesday, May 12; 3:00 pm EDT; Game 5	(1) Georgia Gwinnett	12–6	(2) Louisiana Christian	Grizzly Baseball Complex; Attendance: 415; Umpires: HP: Craig Hammer, 1B: Pat Gentry, 2B: John Walrath, 3B: Jackie Halstead
Tuesday, May 12; 3:00 pm EDT; Game 5	WP: Gavin LeBlanc (5–2)	Boxscore	LP: Brandon Carter (8–4)	Grizzly Baseball Complex; Attendance: 415; Umpires: HP: Craig Hammer, 1B: Pat Gentry, 2B: John Walrath, 3B: Jackie Halstead

Tuesday, May 12; 7:00 pm EDT; Game 6	(4) Northwestern Ohio	9–5	(5) Talladega (AL)	Grizzly Baseball Complex; Attendance: 120; Umpires: HP: Chris Schwarzer, 1B: Van Lewsader, 2B: Nick Reynolds, 3B: Matt Hunter
Tuesday, May 12; 7:00 pm EDT; Game 6	WP: Carter Hicks (2–0); Sv: Aidan Nugent (1)	Boxscore	LP: Yasser Flores Reyes (2–2)	Grizzly Baseball Complex; Attendance: 120; Umpires: HP: Chris Schwarzer, 1B: Van Lewsader, 2B: Nick Reynolds, 3B: Matt Hunter
Tuesday, May 12; 7:00 pm EDT; Game 6	HR: Casey Barnes (7)	Boxscore		Grizzly Baseball Complex; Attendance: 120; Umpires: HP: Chris Schwarzer, 1B: Van Lewsader, 2B: Nick Reynolds, 3B: Matt Hunter

Wednesday, May 13; 11:00 am EDT; Game 7	(2) Louisiana Christian	16–3 (F/7)	(4) Northwestern Ohio	Grizzly Baseball Complex; Attendance: 150; Umpires: HP: Pat Gentry, 1B: John Walrath, 2B: Jackie Halstead, 3B: Nick Reynolds
Wednesday, May 13; 11:00 am EDT; Game 7	WP: Jacob Bareswill (5–3)	Boxscore	LP: Sinjon Bobolia (6–4)	Grizzly Baseball Complex; Attendance: 150; Umpires: HP: Pat Gentry, 1B: John Walrath, 2B: Jackie Halstead, 3B: Nick Reynolds
Wednesday, May 13; 11:00 am EDT; Game 7	HR: Harrison Waxley (2)	Boxscore	HR: Casey Barnes (8)	Grizzly Baseball Complex; Attendance: 150; Umpires: HP: Pat Gentry, 1B: John Walrath, 2B: Jackie Halstead, 3B: Nick Reynolds

Wednesday, May 13; 3:00 pm EDT; Game 8	(2) Louisiana Christian	4–12	(1) Georgia Gwinnett	Grizzly Baseball Complex; Umpires: HP: Van Lewsader, 1B: Nick Reynolds, 2B: Pat Gentry, 3B: Chris Schwarzer
Wednesday, May 13; 3:00 pm EDT; Game 8	LP: Owen Simoneaux (5–2)	Boxscore	WP: Kyle Haag (3–0)	Grizzly Baseball Complex; Umpires: HP: Van Lewsader, 1B: Nick Reynolds, 2B: Pat Gentry, 3B: Chris Schwarzer
Wednesday, May 13; 3:00 pm EDT; Game 8	HR: Matthew Cody (5)	Boxscore		Grizzly Baseball Complex; Umpires: HP: Van Lewsader, 1B: Nick Reynolds, 2B: Pat Gentry, 3B: Chris Schwarzer

=== Lewiston Bracket ===
Hosted by Lewis–Clark State College at Harris Field

==== Bracket ====
First Round
1	Lewis–Clark State (ID)	7
4	Keiser (FL)	3
2	Texas A&M–Victoria	0
3	Hope International (CA)	6
First Elimination Game
4	Keiser (FL)	5
2	Texas A&M–Victoria	1

Semifinal
1	Lewis–Clark State (ID)	10^{(7)}
3	Hope International (CA)	0
Second Elimination Game
3	Hope International (CA)	10^{(8)}
4	Keiser (FL)	0

Championship
1	Lewis–Clark State (ID)	3^{(10)}	–
3	Hope International (CA)	2	–

==== Results ====
Monday, May 11; 2:30 pm PDT; Game 1	(3) Hope International (CA)	6–0	(2) Texas A&M–Victoria	Harris Field; Attendance: 110; Umpires: HP: Trevon Vanairsdale, 1B: Pat Zink, 2B: Joshua Henwood, 3B: Skyler Sadowsky
Monday, May 11; 2:30 pm PDT; Game 1	WP: Josh Landry (11–3)	Boxscore	LP: Jonathan Jones (12–4)	Harris Field; Attendance: 110; Umpires: HP: Trevon Vanairsdale, 1B: Pat Zink, 2B: Joshua Henwood, 3B: Skyler Sadowsky
Monday, May 11; 2:30 pm PDT; Game 1	HR: David Allen (1)	Boxscore		Harris Field; Attendance: 110; Umpires: HP: Trevon Vanairsdale, 1B: Pat Zink, 2B: Joshua Henwood, 3B: Skyler Sadowsky

Monday, May 11; 6:00 pm PDT; Game 2	(4) Keiser (FL)	3–7	(1) Lewis–Clark State (ID)	Harris Field; Attendance: 580; Umpires: HP: Chad Chittenden, 1B: Joshua Henwood, 2B: Skyler Sadowsky, 3B: Kirk Ordway
Monday, May 11; 6:00 pm PDT; Game 2	LP: Austin Taylor (8–2)	Boxscore	WP: Evan Canfield (8–1)	Harris Field; Attendance: 580; Umpires: HP: Chad Chittenden, 1B: Joshua Henwood, 2B: Skyler Sadowsky, 3B: Kirk Ordway
Monday, May 11; 6:00 pm PDT; Game 2		Boxscore	HR: Brandon Nguyen (13)	Harris Field; Attendance: 580; Umpires: HP: Chad Chittenden, 1B: Joshua Henwood, 2B: Skyler Sadowsky, 3B: Kirk Ordway

Tuesday, May 12; 2:30 pm PDT; Game 3	(2) Texas A&M–Victoria	1–5	(4) Keiser (FL)	Harris Field; Attendance: 60; Umpires: HP: Pat Zink, 1B: Skyler Sandowsky, 2B: Kirk Ordway, 3B: Trevon Vanairdale
Tuesday, May 12; 2:30 pm PDT; Game 3	LP: Blane Zeplin (10–2)	Boxscore	WP: Carson Hawkes (8–3); Sv: Seth Broadwell (5)	Harris Field; Attendance: 60; Umpires: HP: Pat Zink, 1B: Skyler Sandowsky, 2B: Kirk Ordway, 3B: Trevon Vanairdale

Tuesday, May 12; 6:00 pm PDT; Game 4	(1) Lewis–Clark State (ID)	10–0 (F/7)	(3) Hope International (CA)	Harris Field; Attendance: 565; Umpires: HP: Joshua Henwood, 1B: Kirk Ordway, 2B: Trevon Vanairsdale, 3B: Chad Chittenden
Tuesday, May 12; 6:00 pm PDT; Game 4	WP: Mason Goodson (7–1)	Boxscore	LP: Jake Thrift (6–2)	Harris Field; Attendance: 565; Umpires: HP: Joshua Henwood, 1B: Kirk Ordway, 2B: Trevon Vanairsdale, 3B: Chad Chittenden

Wednesday, May 13; 2:30 pm PDT; Game 5	(4) Keiser (FL)	0–10 (F/8)	(3) Hope International (CA)	Harris Field; Umpires: HP: Skyler Sadowsky, 1B: Trevon Vanairdale, 2B: Chad Chittenden, 3B: Pat Zink
Wednesday, May 13; 2:30 pm PDT; Game 5	LP: Carson Hawkes (8–4)	Boxscore	WP: James Williams (5–1)	Harris Field; Umpires: HP: Skyler Sadowsky, 1B: Trevon Vanairdale, 2B: Chad Chittenden, 3B: Pat Zink
Wednesday, May 13; 2:30 pm PDT; Game 5		Boxscore	HR: Royce Clayton Jr. (9)	Harris Field; Umpires: HP: Skyler Sadowsky, 1B: Trevon Vanairdale, 2B: Chad Chittenden, 3B: Pat Zink

Wednesday, May 13; 6:00 pm PDT; Game 6	(3) Hope International (CA)	2–3 (F/10)	(1) Lewis–Clark State (ID)	Harris Field; Attendance: 570; Umpires: HP: Kirk Ordway, 1B: Chad Chattenden, 2B: Pat Zink, 3B: Joshua Henwood
Wednesday, May 13; 6:00 pm PDT; Game 6	LP: Franky Lopez (6–4)	Boxscore	WP: Joey Estrada (3–1)	Harris Field; Attendance: 570; Umpires: HP: Kirk Ordway, 1B: Chad Chattenden, 2B: Pat Zink, 3B: Joshua Henwood

=== Lincoln Bracket ===
Hosted by Doane University at Sherman Field

==== Bracket ====
First Round
1	Doane (NE)	11
4	Oakland City (IN)	8
2	Texas Wesleyan	1
3	Madonna (MI)	6
First Elimination Game
4	Oakland City (IN)	11
2	Texas Wesleyan	17

Semifinal
1	Doane (NE)	10
3	Madonna (MI)	9
Second Elimination Game
3	Madonna (MI)	6
2	Texas Wesleyan	2

Championship
1	Doane (NE)	7	–
3	Madonna (MI)	4	–

==== Results ====
Monday, May 11; 12:00 pm CDT; Game 1	(3) Madonna (MI)	6–1	(2) Texas Wesleyan	Sherman Field; Umpires: HP: Michael Andrick, 1B: Kelly Callanan, 2B: John Thayer, 3B: Dan Mullenbach
Monday, May 11; 12:00 pm CDT; Game 1	WP: Jason Jurczyk (10–2)	Boxscore	LP: Michael Pelosi (7–3)	Sherman Field; Umpires: HP: Michael Andrick, 1B: Kelly Callanan, 2B: John Thayer, 3B: Dan Mullenbach
Monday, May 11; 12:00 pm CDT; Game 1	HR: Kevin Davis (3)	Boxscore	HR: Gabriel Supelveda (2)	Sherman Field; Umpires: HP: Michael Andrick, 1B: Kelly Callanan, 2B: John Thayer, 3B: Dan Mullenbach

Monday, May 11; 4:00 pm CDT; Game 2	(4) Oakland City (IN)	8–11	(1) Doane (NE)	Sherman Field; Attendance: 200
Monday, May 11; 4:00 pm CDT; Game 2	LP: Clark Gries (0–1)	Boxscore	WP: Cade Bridges (4–1)	Sherman Field; Attendance: 200
Monday, May 11; 4:00 pm CDT; Game 2	HR: Oliver Hamilton (6)	Boxscore	HR: Sam Kwapnioski (11)	Sherman Field; Attendance: 200

Tuesday, May 12; 12:00 pm CDT; Game 3	(2) Texas Wesleyan	17–11	(4) Oakland City (IN)	Sherman Field; Attendance: 50
Tuesday, May 12; 12:00 pm CDT; Game 3	WP: Noah Huerta (4–2)	Boxscore	LP: Tommy Johnson (4–6)	Sherman Field; Attendance: 50
Tuesday, May 12; 12:00 pm CDT; Game 3	HR: Gabriel Supelveda (3), Jonathan Pena (4), Giuseppe Buttaci (5)	Boxscore	HR: Simon Gaines (8), Nazhir Bergen 2 (18) , Dicky Gonzalez (9)	Sherman Field; Attendance: 50

Tuesday, May 12; 4:00 pm CDT; Game 4	(1) Doane (NE)	10–9	(3) Madonna (MI)	Sherman Field; Attendance: 200
Tuesday, May 12; 4:00 pm CDT; Game 4	WP: Ethan Merk (4–3)	Boxscore	LP: David Zilch (5–2)	Sherman Field; Attendance: 200
Tuesday, May 12; 4:00 pm CDT; Game 4	HR: Carter Roth (12)	Boxscore	HR: Aamir Mitchell (23), Ty Stepek (12), Kooper Etheridge (6)	Sherman Field; Attendance: 200

Wednesday, May 13; 12:00 pm CDT; Game 5	(2) Texas Wesleyan	2–6	(3) Madonna (MI)	Sherman Field
Wednesday, May 13; 12:00 pm CDT; Game 5	LP: Samuel Mendez (10–3)	Boxscore	WP: Ethan Gajewski (6–1)	Sherman Field
Wednesday, May 13; 12:00 pm CDT; Game 5	HR: Jorge Herrera (2)	Boxscore	HR: Aamir Mitchell (24), Ty Stepek (13)	Sherman Field

Wednesday, May 13; 4:00 pm CDT; Game 6	(3) Madonna (MI)	4–7	(1) Doane (NE)	Sherman Field
Wednesday, May 13; 4:00 pm CDT; Game 6	LP: Matthew Sevensma (1–4)	Boxscore	WP: Broc Songster (5–0); Sv: Garrett Klein (6)	Sherman Field

=== Salina Bracket ===
Hosted by Kansas Wesleyan University at Dean Evans Stadium

==== Bracket ====
First Round
1	Johnson (TN)	20^{(8)}
4	Our Lady of the Lake (TX)	10
2	Kansas Wesleyan	5
3	Concordia (NE)	4
First Elimination Game
4	Our Lady of the Lake (TX)	8
3	Concordia (NE)	9

Semifinal
1	Johnson (TN)	10
2	Kansas Wesleyan	3
Second Elimination Game
2	Kansas Wesleyan	5^{(12)}
3	Concordia (NE)	4

Championship
1	Johnson (TN)	9	–
2	Kansas Wesleyan	8	–

==== Results ====
Monday, May 11; 11:00 am CDT; Game 1	(3) Concordia (NE)	4–5	(2) Kansas Wesleyan	Dean Evans Stadium; Umpires: HP: Mike Reeds, 1B: PJ Sarwinski, 2B: Dean Carson, 3B: Sean Bolte
Monday, May 11; 11:00 am CDT; Game 1	LP: Micah Sweeton (4–3)	Boxscore	WP: Riley Gwin (8–1)	Dean Evans Stadium; Umpires: HP: Mike Reeds, 1B: PJ Sarwinski, 2B: Dean Carson, 3B: Sean Bolte
Monday, May 11; 11:00 am CDT; Game 1	HR: Jimmy Blumberg (6)	Boxscore	HR: Niko Olson (7)	Dean Evans Stadium; Umpires: HP: Mike Reeds, 1B: PJ Sarwinski, 2B: Dean Carson, 3B: Sean Bolte

Monday, May 11; 2:30 pm CDT; Game 2	(4) Our Lady of the Lake (TX)	10–20 (F/8)	(1) Johnson (TN)	Dean Evans Stadium; Umpires: HP: Matthew Weaver, 1B: Dean Carson, 2B: Sean Bolte, 3B: Sean Johnston
Monday, May 11; 2:30 pm CDT; Game 2	LP: Donovan Gamez (8–6)	Boxscore	WP: Kaleb Townsend (3–2)	Dean Evans Stadium; Umpires: HP: Matthew Weaver, 1B: Dean Carson, 2B: Sean Bolte, 3B: Sean Johnston
Monday, May 11; 2:30 pm CDT; Game 2	HR: Jack Kalisky (8), Diego Zuniga (5)	Boxscore	HR: Mitchell Birdsall (5)	Dean Evans Stadium; Umpires: HP: Matthew Weaver, 1B: Dean Carson, 2B: Sean Bolte, 3B: Sean Johnston

Tuesday, May 12; 11:00 am CDT; Game 3	(3) Concordia (NE)	9–8	(4) Our Lady of the Lake (TX)	Dean Evans Stadium; Umpires: HP: Dean Carson, 1B: Sean Bolte, 2B: Mike Reeds, 3B: Sean Johnston
Tuesday, May 12; 11:00 am CDT; Game 3	WP: Alex Johnson (8–2); Sv: Warren Rose (3)	Boxscore	LP: Noah Ferraro (8–3)	Dean Evans Stadium; Umpires: HP: Dean Carson, 1B: Sean Bolte, 2B: Mike Reeds, 3B: Sean Johnston
Tuesday, May 12; 11:00 am CDT; Game 3	HR: Bronx Lewis (24), Luke Wilson (11), Jaeden Jordahl (7)	Boxscore	HR: Diego Zuniga (6)	Dean Evans Stadium; Umpires: HP: Dean Carson, 1B: Sean Bolte, 2B: Mike Reeds, 3B: Sean Johnston

Tuesday, May 12; 2:30 pm CDT; Game 4	(1) Johnson (TN)	10–3	(2) Kansas Wesleyan	Dean Evans Stadium; Umpires: HP: Sean Johnston, 1B: Matthew Weaver, 2B: PJ Sarwinski, 3B: Mike Reeds
Tuesday, May 12; 2:30 pm CDT; Game 4	WP: Colby Reynolds (12–2)	Boxscore	LP: Shaw Lee (8–3)	Dean Evans Stadium; Umpires: HP: Sean Johnston, 1B: Matthew Weaver, 2B: PJ Sarwinski, 3B: Mike Reeds
Tuesday, May 12; 2:30 pm CDT; Game 4		Boxscore	HR: Garrett Garfield (10), Fernando Ruvalcaba (22)	Dean Evans Stadium; Umpires: HP: Sean Johnston, 1B: Matthew Weaver, 2B: PJ Sarwinski, 3B: Mike Reeds

Wednesday, May 12; 11:00 am CDT; Game 5	(2) Kansas Wesleyan	5–4 (F/12)	(3) Concordia (NE)	Dean Evans Stadium; Umpires: HP: Sean Bolte, 1B: Mike Reeds, 2B: Sean Johnston, 3B: Matthew Weaver
Wednesday, May 12; 11:00 am CDT; Game 5	WP: Riley Gwin (9–1)	Boxscore	LP: DJ Andersen (0–2)	Dean Evans Stadium; Umpires: HP: Sean Bolte, 1B: Mike Reeds, 2B: Sean Johnston, 3B: Matthew Weaver
Wednesday, May 12; 11:00 am CDT; Game 5	HR: Fernando Ruvalcaba (23)	Boxscore	HR: Bronx Lewis (25), Jake Tyler (5)	Dean Evans Stadium; Umpires: HP: Sean Bolte, 1B: Mike Reeds, 2B: Sean Johnston, 3B: Matthew Weaver

Wednesday, May 13; 2:30 pm CDT; Game 6	(2) Kansas Wesleyan	8–9	(1) Johnson (TN)	Dean Evans Stadium; Umpires: HP: PJ Sarwinski, 1B: Matthew Weaver, 2B: Dean Carson, 3B: Sean Johnston
Wednesday, May 13; 2:30 pm CDT; Game 6	LP: Davin Hinote (3–1)	Boxscore	WP: Tyler Barfield (11–3); Sv: Kaleb Townsend (8)	Dean Evans Stadium; Umpires: HP: PJ Sarwinski, 1B: Matthew Weaver, 2B: Dean Carson, 3B: Sean Johnston
Wednesday, May 13; 2:30 pm CDT; Game 6		Boxscore	HR: Travis Hobbensiefken (5), Mitchell Birdsall (6)	Dean Evans Stadium; Umpires: HP: PJ Sarwinski, 1B: Matthew Weaver, 2B: Dean Carson, 3B: Sean Johnston

=== Shreveport Bracket ===
Hosted by Louisiana State University Shreveport at Pilot Field

==== Bracket ====
First Round
4	Oklahoma Wesleyan	8
5	Huston–Tillotson (TX)	0
First Elimination Game
5	Huston–Tillotson (TX)	0
3	Loyola (LA)	9

Second Round
1	LSU–Shreveport	5
4	Oklahoma Wesleyan	4
2	Mid-America Christian (OK)	3
3	Loyola (LA)	2
Second Elimination Game
4	Oklahoma Wesleyan	8
3	Loyola (LA)	2

Semifinal
1	LSU–Shreveport	2
2	Mid-America Christian (OK)	8
Third Elimination Game
1	LSU–Shreveport	6^{(11)}
4	Oklahoma Wesleyan	5

Championship
2	Mid-America Christian (OK)	7	–
1	LSU–Shreveport	4	–

==== Results ====
Monday, May 11; 11:00 am CDT; Game 1	(5) Huston–Tillotson (TX)	0–8	(4) Oklahoma Wesleyan	Pilot Field; Attendance: 173; Umpires: HP: Jake Hill, 1B: Cody Whitehead, 2B: Kalen Hamilton, 3B: Terrence Mobley
Monday, May 11; 11:00 am CDT; Game 1	LP: Weston Bailey (8–3)	Boxscore	WP: Gavin Florio (2–5)	Pilot Field; Attendance: 173; Umpires: HP: Jake Hill, 1B: Cody Whitehead, 2B: Kalen Hamilton, 3B: Terrence Mobley

Monday, May 11; 2:30 pm CDT; Game 2	(3) Loyola (LA)	2–3	(2) Mid-America Christian (OK)	Pilot Field; Attendance: 242; Umpires: HP: Dylan Parnham, 1B: Daniel Rios, 2B: Bill Powell, 3B: Brandon Guerra
Monday, May 11; 2:30 pm CDT; Game 2	LP: Michael Hotard (6–3)	Boxscore	WP: Ibrahim Gonzalez (11–2)	Pilot Field; Attendance: 242; Umpires: HP: Dylan Parnham, 1B: Daniel Rios, 2B: Bill Powell, 3B: Brandon Guerra
Monday, May 11; 2:30 pm CDT; Game 2		Boxscore	HR: Nick Hill (22)	Pilot Field; Attendance: 242; Umpires: HP: Dylan Parnham, 1B: Daniel Rios, 2B: Bill Powell, 3B: Brandon Guerra

Monday, May 11; 6:00 pm CDT; Game 3	(4) Oklahoma Wesleyan	4–5	(1) LSU–Shreveport	Pilot Field; Attendance: 307; Umpires: HP: Cody Whitehead, 1B: Kalen Hamilton, 2B: Terrence Mobley, 3B: Jake Hill
Monday, May 11; 6:00 pm CDT; Game 3	LP: Austin Stephenson (6–3)	Boxscore	WP: Jacobo Gallegos (6–1)	Pilot Field; Attendance: 307; Umpires: HP: Cody Whitehead, 1B: Kalen Hamilton, 2B: Terrence Mobley, 3B: Jake Hill
Monday, May 11; 6:00 pm CDT; Game 3	HR: Gilbert Morales (11)	Boxscore		Pilot Field; Attendance: 307; Umpires: HP: Cody Whitehead, 1B: Kalen Hamilton, 2B: Terrence Mobley, 3B: Jake Hill

Tuesday, May 12; 11:00 am CDT; Game 4	(3) Loyola (LA)	9–0	(5) Huston–Tillotson (TX)	Pilot Field; Attendance: 215; Umpires: HP: Daniel Rios, 1B: Bill Powell, 2B: Brandon Guerra, 3B: Dylan Parnham
Tuesday, May 12; 11:00 am CDT; Game 4	WP: Brady Bowen (7–4)	Boxscore	LP: Ethan Walker (8–4)	Pilot Field; Attendance: 215; Umpires: HP: Daniel Rios, 1B: Bill Powell, 2B: Brandon Guerra, 3B: Dylan Parnham

Tuesday, May 12; 2:30 pm CDT; Game 5	(2) Mid-America Christian (OK)	8–2	(1) LSU–Shreveport	Pilot Field; Umpires: HP: Kalen Hamilton, 1B: Terrence Mobley, 2B: Jake Hill, 3B: Cody Whitehead
Tuesday, May 12; 2:30 pm CDT; Game 5	WP: Fabian Hernandez (5–2)	Boxscore	LP: David Hankins (7–2)	Pilot Field; Umpires: HP: Kalen Hamilton, 1B: Terrence Mobley, 2B: Jake Hill, 3B: Cody Whitehead
Tuesday, May 12; 2:30 pm CDT; Game 5	HR: Nick Hill 2 (24)	Boxscore		Pilot Field; Umpires: HP: Kalen Hamilton, 1B: Terrence Mobley, 2B: Jake Hill, 3B: Cody Whitehead

Tuesday, May 12; 6:00 pm CDT; Game 6	(4) Oklahoma Wesleyan	8–2	(3) Loyola (LA)	Pilot Field
Tuesday, May 12; 6:00 pm CDT; Game 6	WP: Ashton Luera (10–3)	Boxscore	LP: Thomas Hakimian (5–3)	Pilot Field
Tuesday, May 12; 6:00 pm CDT; Game 6	HR: Caden Stinson (4)	Boxscore	HR: Drew Lee (2)	Pilot Field

Wednesday, May 13; 11:00 am CDT; Game 7	(1) LSU–Shreveport	6–5 (F/11)	(4) Oklahoma Wesleyan	Pilot Field; Attendance: 143; Umpires: HP: Terrence Mobley, 1B: Jake Hill, 2B: Cody Whitehead, 3B: Kalen Hamilton
Wednesday, May 13; 11:00 am CDT; Game 7	WP: Joan Roman (3–0); Sv: Virot Siharath (1)	Boxscore	LP: Gavin Florio (2–6)	Pilot Field; Attendance: 143; Umpires: HP: Terrence Mobley, 1B: Jake Hill, 2B: Cody Whitehead, 3B: Kalen Hamilton
Wednesday, May 13; 11:00 am CDT; Game 7		Boxscore	HR: Brenden Poindexter (5)	Pilot Field; Attendance: 143; Umpires: HP: Terrence Mobley, 1B: Jake Hill, 2B: Cody Whitehead, 3B: Kalen Hamilton

Wednesday, May 13; 2:30 pm CDT; Game 8	(1) LSU–Shreveport	4–7	(2) Mid-America Christian (OK)	Pilot Field
Wednesday, May 13; 2:30 pm CDT; Game 8	LP: Calvin Shepherd (2–3)	Boxscore	WP: Carlos Uribe (4–1); Sv: Byron Madero (1)	Pilot Field

=== Upland Bracket ===
Hosted by Taylor University at Winterholter Field

==== Bracket ====
First Round
4	Mount Mercy (IA)	1
5	Shawnee State (OH)	12^{(7)}
First Elimination Game
4	Mount Mercy (IA)	4
2	Abraham Baldwin (GA)	6

Second Round
1	Taylor (IN)	6
5	Shawnee State (OH)	1
2	Abraham Baldwin (GA)	10
3	Indiana Tech	16
Second Elimination Game
5	Shawnee State (OH)	10
2	Abraham Baldwin (GA)	3

Semifinal
1	Taylor (IN)	19^{(7)}
3	Indiana Tech	5
Third Elimination Game
3	Indiana Tech	9
5	Shawnee State (OH)	3

Championship
1	Taylor (IN)	22	–
3	Indiana Tech	10	–

==== Results ====
Monday, May 11; 11:00 am EDT; Game 1	(5) Shawnee State (OH)	12–1 (F/7)	(4) Mount Mercy (IA)	Winterholter Field; Attendance: 398
Monday, May 11; 11:00 am EDT; Game 1	WP: Richardo Medrano (9–0)	Boxscore	LP: Jack Turgasen (6–5)	Winterholter Field; Attendance: 398
Monday, May 11; 11:00 am EDT; Game 1	HR: Jace Parnin (11), Nolan Austin (8)	Boxscore		Winterholter Field; Attendance: 398

Monday, May 11; 2:30 pm EDT; Game 2	(3) Indiana Tech	16–10	(2) Abraham Baldwin (GA)	Winterholter Field; Attendance: 212
Monday, May 11; 2:30 pm EDT; Game 2	WP: Kaden Plank (7–1)	Boxscore	LP: Drew Hurst (5–2)	Winterholter Field; Attendance: 212
Monday, May 11; 2:30 pm EDT; Game 2	HR: Derek Ruiz (1), Brycen Hannah 2 (12)	Boxscore	HR: Dylan Davis (12), Kam Taylor (3)	Winterholter Field; Attendance: 212

Monday, May 11; 6:00 pm EDT; Game 3	(5) Shawnee State (OH)	1–6	(1) Taylor (IN)	Winterholter Field; Attendance: 614
Monday, May 11; 6:00 pm EDT; Game 3	LP: Owen Elsey (5–4)	Boxscore	WP: Nathan Frady (5–1)	Winterholter Field; Attendance: 614
Monday, May 11; 6:00 pm EDT; Game 3		Boxscore	HR: Fletcher Roemmich (11), Brayden Manning (13), Ben Kennedy (10), Sam Gladd (8)	Winterholter Field; Attendance: 614

Tuesday, May 12; 11:00 am EDT; Game 4	(4) Mount Mercy (IA)	4–6	(2) Abraham Baldwin (GA)	Winterholter Field; Attendance: 88
Tuesday, May 12; 11:00 am EDT; Game 4	LP: Cole Conner (7–3)	Boxscore	WP: Kade Haywood (9–3)	Winterholter Field; Attendance: 88
Tuesday, May 12; 11:00 am EDT; Game 4	HR: Drew Terpins (5), Lane Spieker (14)	Boxscore	HR: Dylan Davis (13), Kam Taylor (4), Chasin Cash (7)	Winterholter Field; Attendance: 88

Tuesday, May 12; 2:30 pm EDT; Game 5	(1) Taylor (IN)	19–5 (F/7)	(3) Indiana Tech	Winterholter Field; Attendance: 519
Tuesday, May 12; 2:30 pm EDT; Game 5	WP: Wes Hunt (7–0)	Boxscore	LP: Ben Hammond (6–2)	Winterholter Field; Attendance: 519
Tuesday, May 12; 2:30 pm EDT; Game 5	HR: Jordan Malott 2 (17), Brennan Frickel 2 (9), Sam Gladd (9)	Boxscore	HR: Jack Ferguson (14)	Winterholter Field; Attendance: 519

Tuesday, May 12; 6:00 pm EDT; Game 6	(2) Abraham Baldwin (GA)	3–10	(5) Shawnee State (OH)	Winterholter Field; Attendance: 371
Tuesday, May 12; 6:00 pm EDT; Game 6	LP: Trypp Lumpkin (4–4)	Boxscore	WP: Trevor Ollier (2–1); Sv: Evan Hood (3)	Winterholter Field; Attendance: 371
Tuesday, May 12; 6:00 pm EDT; Game 6	HR: Kam Taylor (5)	Boxscore	HR: Zach Gaspar (5)	Winterholter Field; Attendance: 371

Wednesday, May 13; 1:00 pm EDT; Game 7	(3) Indiana Tech	9–3	(5) Shawnee State (OH)	Winterholter Field; Attendance: 113
Wednesday, May 13; 1:00 pm EDT; Game 7	WP: Kail Baughman (3–1)	Boxscore	LP: Ethan Campbell (3–3)	Winterholter Field; Attendance: 113

Wednesday, May 13; 4:30 pm EDT; Game 8	(1) Taylor (IN)	22–10	(3) Indiana Tech	Winterholter Field; Attendance: 639
Wednesday, May 13; 4:30 pm EDT; Game 8	WP: Jake Boyer (7–1)	Boxscore	LP: Noah Redmon (7–2)	Winterholter Field; Attendance: 639
Wednesday, May 13; 4:30 pm EDT; Game 8	HR: Jordan Malott (18), Ben Kennedy (11)	Boxscore	HR: Jack Ferguson (15), Brycen Hannah (13)	Winterholter Field; Attendance: 639

=== Williamsburg Bracket ===
Hosted by the University of the Cumberlands at Doyle Buhl Stadium

==== Bracket ====
First Round
4	Bryan (TN)	8
5	Central Baptist (AR)	7
First Elimination Game
5	Central Baptist (AR)	1
2	Missouri Baptist	9

Second Round
1	Cumberlands (KY)	2
4	Bryan (TN)	9
2	Missouri Baptist	9
3	William Carey (MS)	13
Second Elimination Game
1	Cumberlands (KY)	8
2	Missouri Baptist	4

Semifinal
4	Bryan (TN)	8
3	William Carey (MS)	9
Third Elimination Game
4	Bryan (TN)	4
1	Cumberlands (KY)	12

Championship
3	William Carey (MS)	13	–
1	Cumberlands (KY)	11	–

==== Results ====
Monday, May 11; 12:00 pm EDT; Game 1	(5) Central Baptist (AR)	7–8	(4) Bryan (TN)	Doyle Buhl Stadium; Umpires: HP: Kyle Parman, 1B: Chris Spurlock, 2B: Hoss Matherson, 3B: Jason Reed
Monday, May 11; 12:00 pm EDT; Game 1	LP: Jamin Smith (2–2)	Boxscore	WP: Ty Johnson (6–3)	Doyle Buhl Stadium; Umpires: HP: Kyle Parman, 1B: Chris Spurlock, 2B: Hoss Matherson, 3B: Jason Reed
Monday, May 11; 12:00 pm EDT; Game 1	HR: Aaron Prince (9)	Boxscore	HR: Jayron Morris (12), Will Curcio (13), Logan Stradley (8)	Doyle Buhl Stadium; Umpires: HP: Kyle Parman, 1B: Chris Spurlock, 2B: Hoss Matherson, 3B: Jason Reed

Monday, May 11; 3:30 pm EDT; Game 2	(3) William Carey (MS)	13–9	(2) Missouri Baptist	Doyle Buhl Stadium
Monday, May 11; 3:30 pm EDT; Game 2	WP: Jimmie Johnson (6–2)	Boxscore	LP: JD Whitter (1–1)	Doyle Buhl Stadium
Monday, May 11; 3:30 pm EDT; Game 2	HR: Franklin Hernandez (5)	Boxscore	HR: Carlos Hidalgo (15), Angelo Franco (5), Sam Paule (6)	Doyle Buhl Stadium

Monday, May 11; 7:00 pm EDT; Game 3	(4) Bryan (TN)	9–2	(1) Cumberlands (KY)	Doyle Buhl Stadium; Umpires: HP: Hoss Matherson, 1B: Chris Spurlock, 2B: Jason Reed, 3B; Kyle Parman
Monday, May 11; 7:00 pm EDT; Game 3	WP: Ty Johnson (7–3)	Boxscore	LP: Wesley Culley (9–2)	Doyle Buhl Stadium; Umpires: HP: Hoss Matherson, 1B: Chris Spurlock, 2B: Jason Reed, 3B; Kyle Parman
Monday, May 11; 7:00 pm EDT; Game 3	HR: Jayron Morris (13)	Boxscore		Doyle Buhl Stadium; Umpires: HP: Hoss Matherson, 1B: Chris Spurlock, 2B: Jason Reed, 3B; Kyle Parman

Tuesday, May 12; 12:00 pm EDT; Game 4	(2) Missouri Baptist	9–1	(5) Central Baptist (AR)	Doyle Buhl Stadium; Umpires: HP: Jonathan Smith, 1B: Jay Brown, 2B: Mark McNabney, 3B: Justin Clarke
Tuesday, May 12; 12:00 pm EDT; Game 4	WP: Tait Robertson (6–2)	Boxscore	LP: Jaxon Kirkhuff (5–4)	Doyle Buhl Stadium; Umpires: HP: Jonathan Smith, 1B: Jay Brown, 2B: Mark McNabney, 3B: Justin Clarke
Tuesday, May 12; 12:00 pm EDT; Game 4	HR: Carlos Hidalgo (16), Jayden Orozco (13), Max Shabestari (9)	Boxscore		Doyle Buhl Stadium; Umpires: HP: Jonathan Smith, 1B: Jay Brown, 2B: Mark McNabney, 3B: Justin Clarke

Tuesday, May 12; 3:30 pm EDT; Game 5	(4) Bryan (TN)	8–9	(3) William Carey (MS)	Doyle Buhl Stadium
Tuesday, May 12; 3:30 pm EDT; Game 5	LP: Ryan Ely (1–1)	Boxscore	WP: Gage Hinnant (2–0)	Doyle Buhl Stadium
Tuesday, May 12; 3:30 pm EDT; Game 5		Boxscore	HR: Tyler Ducksworth (5)	Doyle Buhl Stadium

Tuesday, May 12; 7:00 pm EDT; Game 6	(1) Cumberlands (KY)	8–4	(2) Missouri Baptist	Doyle Buhl Stadium; Umpires: HP: Jay Brown, 1B: Mark McNabney, 2B: Justin Clarke, 3B: Jonathan Smith
Tuesday, May 12; 7:00 pm EDT; Game 6	WP: Justin Cortez (5–0)	Boxscore	LP: Tyler Timmerman (5–5)	Doyle Buhl Stadium; Umpires: HP: Jay Brown, 1B: Mark McNabney, 2B: Justin Clarke, 3B: Jonathan Smith
Tuesday, May 12; 7:00 pm EDT; Game 6	HR: Johnboy Rittenhouse 2 (16)	Boxscore		Doyle Buhl Stadium; Umpires: HP: Jay Brown, 1B: Mark McNabney, 2B: Justin Clarke, 3B: Jonathan Smith

Wednesday, May 13; 12:00 pm EDT; Game 7	(1) Cumberlands (KY)	12–4	(4) Bryan (TN)	Doyle Buhl Stadium; Umpires: HP: Jason Reed, 1B: Gary Matherson, 2B: Chris Spurlock, 3B: Kyle Parman
Wednesday, May 13; 12:00 pm EDT; Game 7	WP: Nolan Wilson (9–1)	Boxscore	LP: Bryce Liechty (3–3)	Doyle Buhl Stadium; Umpires: HP: Jason Reed, 1B: Gary Matherson, 2B: Chris Spurlock, 3B: Kyle Parman
Wednesday, May 13; 12:00 pm EDT; Game 7	HR: Pedro Vasquez (17)	Boxscore		Doyle Buhl Stadium; Umpires: HP: Jason Reed, 1B: Gary Matherson, 2B: Chris Spurlock, 3B: Kyle Parman

Wednesday, May 13; 3:30 pm EDT; Game 8	(3) William Carey (MS)	13–11	(1) Cumberlands (KY)	Doyle Buhl Stadium; Umpires: HP: Mark McNabney, 1B: Justin Clarke, 2B: Jay Brown, 3B: Jonathan Smith
Wednesday, May 13; 3:30 pm EDT; Game 8	WP: Adam May (1–1); Sv: Matthew Davis (1)	Boxscore	LP: Jaden Morris (2–2)	Doyle Buhl Stadium; Umpires: HP: Mark McNabney, 1B: Justin Clarke, 2B: Jay Brown, 3B: Jonathan Smith
Wednesday, May 13; 3:30 pm EDT; Game 8	HR: DeeJay Booth 2 (11), Jayden Mark (3)	Boxscore	HR: Derick Andiarena (19), Ronald Almanzar 2 (25), Caden Petrey 2 (19)	Doyle Buhl Stadium; Umpires: HP: Mark McNabney, 1B: Justin Clarke, 2B: Jay Brown, 3B: Jonathan Smith

== NAIA World Series ==
The Avista NAIA World Series was held at Harris Field in Lewiston, Idaho from May 22 to 30.

=== Participants ===
School	Conference	Record	Head Coach	Bracket	Previous NAIA WS Appearances	Best NAIA WS Finish	NAIA WS Record
Doane (NE)	Great Plains	47–9	Josh Oltmans	Lincoln	none	none	0–0
Georgia Gwinnett	Continental	49–6	Tommy Goodale	Lawrenceville	8 (last: 2025)	1st (2021)	16–14
IU Southeast	River States	42–14	Vincent Tornincasa	Bellevue	2 (last: 2024)	T-5th (2021)	3–4
Johnson (TN)	Appalachian	40–12	Dave Serrano	Salina	none	none	0–0
Lewis–Clark State (ID)	Cascade	44–7	Jeremiah Robbins	Lewiston	41 (last: 2023)	1st (1984, 1985, 1987, 1988, 1989, 1990, 1991, 1992, 1996, 1999, 2000, 2002, 2003, 2006, 2007, 2008, 2015, 2016, 2017)	156–56
Mid-America Christian (OK)	Sooner	42–13	Brett Stanton	Shreveport	none	none	0–0
Southeastern (FL)	The Sun	43–16	Gabe Grinder	Lakeland	7 (last: 2025)	1st (2018, 2022)	20–11
Taylor (IN)	Crossroads	52–5	Kyle Gould	Upland	2 (last: 2023)	T-5th (1969, 2023)	3–4
Tennessee Wesleyan	Appalachian	43–14	Billy Berry	Kingsport	8 (last: 2025)	1st (2012, 2019)	19–14
William Carey (MS)	Southern States	38–18	Bobby Halford	Williamsburg	5 (last: 2024)	1st (1969)	9–9

=== Bracket ===
First Round
G1 – Friday, May 22
4	Doane (NE)	3
7	Mid-America Christian (OK)	7
G2 – Friday, May 22
1	Taylor (IN)	4
10	William Carey (MS)	7
G3 – Friday, May 22
2	Georgia Gwinnett	13
9	IU Southeast	14
G4 – Friday, May 22
3	Lewis–Clark State (ID)	4
8	Tennessee Wesleyan	12
G5 – Saturday, May 23
5	Southeastern (FL)	14
6	Johnson (TN)	13

Second Round
G9 – Monday, May 25
7	Mid-America Christian (OK)	5
10	William Carey (MS)	6
G10 – Monday, May 25
9	IU Southeast	5
8	Tennessee Wesleyan	0
First Round; Losers eliminated
G6 – Saturday, May 23
4	Doane (NE)	8
1	Taylor (IN)	10
G7 – Saturday, May 23
2	Georgia Gwinnett	1
3	Lewis–Clark State (ID)	12^{(7)}

Third Round
G13 – Wednesday, May 27
9	IU Southeast	4
5	Southeastern (FL)	16^{(8)}
Second Round; Losers eliminated
G8 – Monday, May 25
1	Taylor (IN)	8
3	Lewis–Clark State (ID)	5
G11 – Tuesday, May 26
6	Johnson (TN)	0
8	Tennessee Wesleyan	11^{(7)}

Fourth Round
G15 – Wednesday, May 27
10	William Carey (MS)	17^{(7)}
5	Southeastern (FL)	7
Third Round; Loser eliminated
G12 – Tuesday, May 26/Wednesday, May 27
7	Mid-America Christian (OK)	4
1	Taylor (IN)	13
G14 – Wednesday, May 27
9	IU Southeast	3
8	Tennessee Wesleyan	10

Fifth Round
G17 – Thursday, May 28
10	William Carey (MS)	4
1	Taylor (IN)	7
G16 – Thursday, May 28
5	Southeastern (FL)	5
8	Tennessee Wesleyan	8

Semifinals
G18 – Friday, May 29
10	William Carey (MS)	14
8	Tennessee Wesleyan	16

Championship
G19 – Saturday, May 30
8	Tennessee Wesleyan	21
1	Taylor (IN)	3

=== Game Results ===
All game times are listed in Pacific Daylight Time (UTC−07:00).

Friday, May 22; 8:30 am Game 1	(7) Mid-America Christian (OK)	7–3	(4) Doane (NE)	Harris Field; Attendance: 1205; Umpires: HP: Casey Sanchez, 1B: Kalen Hamilton, 2B: Brad Merda, 3B: Tyler Wall
Friday, May 22; 8:30 am Game 1	WP: Ibrahim Gonzalez (12–2)	Boxscore	LP: Broc Songster (5–1)	Harris Field; Attendance: 1205; Umpires: HP: Casey Sanchez, 1B: Kalen Hamilton, 2B: Brad Merda, 3B: Tyler Wall
Friday, May 22; 8:30 am Game 1	HR: Cole Krepcik (4), Frankie Giacalone (15)	Boxscore		Harris Field; Attendance: 1205; Umpires: HP: Casey Sanchez, 1B: Kalen Hamilton, 2B: Brad Merda, 3B: Tyler Wall

Friday, May 22; 11:30 am Game 2	(10) William Carey (MS)	7–4	(1) Taylor (IN)	Harris Field; Attendance: 1468; Umpires: HP: Cody Whitehead, 1B: Drew Eaton, 2B: Allen Jones, 3B: Ryan Strock
Friday, May 22; 11:30 am Game 2	WP: Jimmie Johnson (7–2)	Boxscore	LP: Jake Boyer (7–2)	Harris Field; Attendance: 1468; Umpires: HP: Cody Whitehead, 1B: Drew Eaton, 2B: Allen Jones, 3B: Ryan Strock
Friday, May 22; 11:30 am Game 2	HR: DeeJay Booth (12)	Boxscore		Harris Field; Attendance: 1468; Umpires: HP: Cody Whitehead, 1B: Drew Eaton, 2B: Allen Jones, 3B: Ryan Strock

Friday, May 22; 3:00 pm Game 3	(9) IU Southeast	14–13	(2) Georgia Gwinnett	Harris Field; Attendance: 1842; Umpires: HP: Kalen Hamilton, 1B: Brad Merda, 2B: Tyler Wall, 3B: Casey Sanchez
Friday, May 22; 3:00 pm Game 3	WP: Weston Harvey (5–4); Sv: Luca Sandrella (1)	Boxscore	LP: Christian Johnson (4–3)	Harris Field; Attendance: 1842; Umpires: HP: Kalen Hamilton, 1B: Brad Merda, 2B: Tyler Wall, 3B: Casey Sanchez
Friday, May 22; 3:00 pm Game 3	HR: Bryson Arnette (12), Chance Bentley (1), Kasen Parks (5)	Boxscore	HR: J.J. Garcia (2), Lance Bratlien (4), Ashton Fuselier (3)	Harris Field; Attendance: 1842; Umpires: HP: Kalen Hamilton, 1B: Brad Merda, 2B: Tyler Wall, 3B: Casey Sanchez

Friday, May 22; 7:00 pm Game 4	(8) Tennessee Wesleyan	12–4	(3) Lewis–Clark State (ID)	Harris Field; Attendance: 3216; Umpires: HP: Drew Eaton, 1B: Allen Jones, 2B: Ryan Storck, 3B: Cody Whitehead
Friday, May 22; 7:00 pm Game 4	WP: Justin Jackson (12–1)	Boxscore	LP: Evan Canfield (8–2)	Harris Field; Attendance: 3216; Umpires: HP: Drew Eaton, 1B: Allen Jones, 2B: Ryan Storck, 3B: Cody Whitehead
Friday, May 22; 7:00 pm Game 4	HR: Allan Gil Fernandez (13), Kolton Reynolds (16), Brayan Espinoza (5)	Boxscore	HR: Brandon Nguyen (14), Izzy Madariaga (11)	Harris Field; Attendance: 3216; Umpires: HP: Drew Eaton, 1B: Allen Jones, 2B: Ryan Storck, 3B: Cody Whitehead

Saturday, May 23; 11:00 am Game 5	(6) Johnson (TN)	13–14	(5) Southeastern (FL)	Harris Field; Attendance: 510; Umpires: HP: Brad Merta, 1B: Tyler Wall, 2B: Casey Sanchez, 3B: Kalen Hamilton
Saturday, May 23; 11:00 am Game 5	LP: Bodey Yates (4–1)	Boxscore	WP: Peyten Czekalewski (5–0); Sv: Blake Albritton (1)	Harris Field; Attendance: 510; Umpires: HP: Brad Merta, 1B: Tyler Wall, 2B: Casey Sanchez, 3B: Kalen Hamilton
Saturday, May 23; 11:00 am Game 5	HR: Izaak Fernandez (5), Christian Altamirano (4)	Boxscore	HR: Armani Cozza (7), Braden Bartholomae (3)	Harris Field; Attendance: 510; Umpires: HP: Brad Merta, 1B: Tyler Wall, 2B: Casey Sanchez, 3B: Kalen Hamilton

Saturday, May 23; 3:00 pm Game 6	(4) Doane (NE)	8–10	(1) Taylor (IN)	Harris Field; Attendance: 479; Umpires: HP: Allen Jones, 1B: Ryan Storck, 2B: Cody Whitehead, 3B: Drew Eaton
Saturday, May 23; 3:00 pm Game 6	LP: Ethen Roberts (1–1)	Boxscore	WP: Jake Boyer (8–2)	Harris Field; Attendance: 479; Umpires: HP: Allen Jones, 1B: Ryan Storck, 2B: Cody Whitehead, 3B: Drew Eaton
Saturday, May 23; 3:00 pm Game 6	HR: Jett Grossart (9), Jordan Bond (6)	Boxscore	HR: Ben Kennedy (12)	Harris Field; Attendance: 479; Umpires: HP: Allen Jones, 1B: Ryan Storck, 2B: Cody Whitehead, 3B: Drew Eaton

Saturday, May 23; 6:30 pm Game 7	(2) Georgia Gwinnett	1–12 (F/7)	(3) Lewis–Clark State (ID)	Harris Field; Attendance: 3133; Umpires: HP: Tyler Wall, 1B: Casey Sanchez, 2B: Kalen Hamilton, 3B: Brad Merta
Saturday, May 23; 6:30 pm Game 7	LP: Gavin LeBlanc (5–3)	Boxscore	WP: Mason Goodson (8–1)	Harris Field; Attendance: 3133; Umpires: HP: Tyler Wall, 1B: Casey Sanchez, 2B: Kalen Hamilton, 3B: Brad Merta
Saturday, May 23; 6:30 pm Game 7	HR: Chris Tillery (2)	Boxscore	HR: Brandon Nguyen (15), Izzy Madariaga (12)	Harris Field; Attendance: 3133; Umpires: HP: Tyler Wall, 1B: Casey Sanchez, 2B: Kalen Hamilton, 3B: Brad Merta

Monday, May 25; 11:00 am Game 8	(1) Taylor (IN)	8–5	(3) Lewis–Clark State (ID)	Harris Field; Attendance: 3738; Umpires: HP: Ryan Storck, 1B: Cody Whitehead, 2B: Drew Eaton, 3B: Allen Jones
Monday, May 25; 11:00 am Game 8	WP: Nathan Frady (6–1); Sv: Gage Gongwer (1)	Boxscore	LP: Landon Webb (5–3)	Harris Field; Attendance: 3738; Umpires: HP: Ryan Storck, 1B: Cody Whitehead, 2B: Drew Eaton, 3B: Allen Jones
Monday, May 25; 11:00 am Game 8	HR: Sam Gladd (10)	Boxscore		Harris Field; Attendance: 3738; Umpires: HP: Ryan Storck, 1B: Cody Whitehead, 2B: Drew Eaton, 3B: Allen Jones

Monday, May 25; 3:00 pm Game 9	(7) Mid-America Christian (OK)	5–6	(10) William Carey (MS)	Harris Field; Attendance: 425; Umpires: HP: Casey Sanchez, 1B: Kalen Hamilton, 2B: Brad Merda, 3B: Tyler Wall
Monday, May 25; 3:00 pm Game 9	LP: Angel Miranda (1–1)	Boxscore	WP: Jimmie Johnson (8–2)	Harris Field; Attendance: 425; Umpires: HP: Casey Sanchez, 1B: Kalen Hamilton, 2B: Brad Merda, 3B: Tyler Wall

Monday, May 25; 6:30 pm Game 10	(8) Tennessee Wesleyan	0–5	(9) IU Southeast	Harris Field; Attendance: 1188; Umpires: HP: Cody Whitehead, 1B: Drew Eaton, 2B: Allen Jones, 3B: Ryan Storck
Monday, May 25; 6:30 pm Game 10	LP: Cameron Goffar (9–3)	Boxscore	WP: Luca Sandrella (5–0); Sv: Jake Gothrup (3)	Harris Field; Attendance: 1188; Umpires: HP: Cody Whitehead, 1B: Drew Eaton, 2B: Allen Jones, 3B: Ryan Storck

Tuesday, May 26; 11:00 am Game 11	(6) Johnson (TN)	0–11 (F/7)	(8) Tennessee Wesleyan	Harris Field; Attendance: 310; Umpires: HP: Kalen Hamilton, 1B: Brad Merta, 2B: Tyler Wall, 3B: Casey Sanchez
Tuesday, May 26; 11:00 am Game 11	LP: Tyler Barfield (11–4)	Boxscore	WP: McGwire Taylor (10–2)	Harris Field; Attendance: 310; Umpires: HP: Kalen Hamilton, 1B: Brad Merta, 2B: Tyler Wall, 3B: Casey Sanchez
Tuesday, May 26; 11:00 am Game 11		Boxscore	HR: Josh Shelly (15)	Harris Field; Attendance: 310; Umpires: HP: Kalen Hamilton, 1B: Brad Merta, 2B: Tyler Wall, 3B: Casey Sanchez

Tuesday, May 26 (Note: Game was suspended in the top of the 5th due to weather and completed on Wednesday, May 27.); 3:00 pm Game 12	(1) Taylor (IN)	13–4	(7) Mid-America Christian (OK)	Harris Field; Attendance: 393; Umpires: HP: Drew Eaton, 1B: Allen Jones, 2B: Ryan Storck, 3B: Cody Whitehead
Tuesday, May 26; 3:00 pm Game 12	WP: Lane Lewis (5–0)	Boxscore	LP: Ibrahim Gonzalez (12–3)	Harris Field; Attendance: 393; Umpires: HP: Drew Eaton, 1B: Allen Jones, 2B: Ryan Storck, 3B: Cody Whitehead
Tuesday, May 26; 3:00 pm Game 12	HR: Jordan Malott (19), Brennan Frickel (10)	Boxscore	HR: Adam Hanan (10)	Harris Field; Attendance: 393; Umpires: HP: Drew Eaton, 1B: Allen Jones, 2B: Ryan Storck, 3B: Cody Whitehead

Wednesday, May 27; 11:30 am Game 13	(5) Southeastern (FL)	16–4 (F/8)	(9) IU Southeast	Harris Field; Attendance: 247; Umpires: HP: Brad Merta, 1B: Tyler Wall, 2B: Casey Sanchez, 3B: Kalen Hamilton
Wednesday, May 27; 11:30 am Game 13	WP: Blake Albritton (7–2)	Boxscore	LP: Aiden Darlage (7–1)	Harris Field; Attendance: 247; Umpires: HP: Brad Merta, 1B: Tyler Wall, 2B: Casey Sanchez, 3B: Kalen Hamilton
Wednesday, May 27; 11:30 am Game 13	HR: Cooper Ciesielski (12), Charlie Collins (8), Nathanial Hopkins (5)	Boxscore	HR: Bryson Arnette (13)	Harris Field; Attendance: 247; Umpires: HP: Brad Merta, 1B: Tyler Wall, 2B: Casey Sanchez, 3B: Kalen Hamilton

Wednesday, May 27; 3:00 pm Game 14	(9) IU Southeast	3–10	(8) Tennessee Wesleyan	Harris Field; Attendance: 281; Umpires: HP: Allen Jones, 1B: Ryan Storck, 2B: Cody Whitehead, 3B: Drew Eaton
Wednesday, May 27; 3:00 pm Game 14	LP: Eli Laurent (1–3)	Boxscore	WP: Colton Brumley (5–0); Sv: Bradley Johnson (3)	Harris Field; Attendance: 281; Umpires: HP: Allen Jones, 1B: Ryan Storck, 2B: Cody Whitehead, 3B: Drew Eaton
Wednesday, May 27; 3:00 pm Game 14		Boxscore	HR: Allan Gil Fernandez (14)	Harris Field; Attendance: 281; Umpires: HP: Allen Jones, 1B: Ryan Storck, 2B: Cody Whitehead, 3B: Drew Eaton

Wednesday, May 27; 6:30 pm Game 15	(5) Southeastern (FL)	7–17 (F/7)	(10) William Carey (MS)	Harris Field; Attendance: 1188; Umpires: HP: Tyler Wall, 1B: Casey Sanchez, 2B: Kalen Hamilton, 3B: Brad Merta
Wednesday, May 27; 6:30 pm Game 15	LP: Austin Peddycoart (5–3)	Boxscore	WP: Matthew Davis (12–2)	Harris Field; Attendance: 1188; Umpires: HP: Tyler Wall, 1B: Casey Sanchez, 2B: Kalen Hamilton, 3B: Brad Merta
Wednesday, May 27; 6:30 pm Game 15		Boxscore	HR: Jayden Mark (4), Tyler Ducksworth (6)	Harris Field; Attendance: 1188; Umpires: HP: Tyler Wall, 1B: Casey Sanchez, 2B: Kalen Hamilton, 3B: Brad Merta

Thursday, May 28; 12:30 pm Game 16	(8) Tennessee Wesleyan	8–5	(5) Southeastern (FL)	Harris Field; Attendance: 180; Umpires: HP: Ryan Storck, 1B: Allen Jones, 2B: Cody Whitehead, 3B: Tyler Wall, RF: Brad Merta
Thursday, May 28; 12:30 pm Game 16	WP: Justin Jackson (13–1)	Boxscore	LP: Byler Reither (9–3)	Harris Field; Attendance: 180; Umpires: HP: Ryan Storck, 1B: Allen Jones, 2B: Cody Whitehead, 3B: Tyler Wall, RF: Brad Merta
Thursday, May 28; 12:30 pm Game 16	HR: Allan Gil Fernandez (15)	Boxscore		Harris Field; Attendance: 180; Umpires: HP: Ryan Storck, 1B: Allen Jones, 2B: Cody Whitehead, 3B: Tyler Wall, RF: Brad Merta

Thursday, May 28; 8:20 pm Game 17	(10) William Carey (MS)	4–7	(1) Taylor (IN)	Harris Field; Attendance: 977; Umpires: HP: Kalen Hamilton, 1B: Brad Merta, 2B: Tyler Wall, 3B: Casey Sanchez, LF: Cody Whitehead, RF: Allen Jones
Thursday, May 28; 8:20 pm Game 17	LP: Josh MacCord (3–3)	Boxscore	WP: Nick Crabtree (2–0); Sv: Nathan Frady (2)	Harris Field; Attendance: 977; Umpires: HP: Kalen Hamilton, 1B: Brad Merta, 2B: Tyler Wall, 3B: Casey Sanchez, LF: Cody Whitehead, RF: Allen Jones
Thursday, May 28; 8:20 pm Game 17		Boxscore	HR: Luke Sutter (10), Brayden Manning (14)	Harris Field; Attendance: 977; Umpires: HP: Kalen Hamilton, 1B: Brad Merta, 2B: Tyler Wall, 3B: Casey Sanchez, LF: Cody Whitehead, RF: Allen Jones

Friday, May 29; 6:30 pm Game 18	(10) William Carey (MS)	14–16	(8) Tennessee Wesleyan	Harris Field; Attendance: 1154; Umpires: HP: Drew Eaton, 1B: Kalen Hamlton, 2B: Casey Sanchez, 3B: Cody Whitehead, LF: Brad Merta, RF: Tyler Wall
Friday, May 29; 6:30 pm Game 18	LP: Matthew Davis (12–3)	Boxscore	WP: Bradley Johnson (3–1)	Harris Field; Attendance: 1154; Umpires: HP: Drew Eaton, 1B: Kalen Hamlton, 2B: Casey Sanchez, 3B: Cody Whitehead, LF: Brad Merta, RF: Tyler Wall
Friday, May 29; 6:30 pm Game 18	HR: Franklin Hernandez (6)	Boxscore	HR: Josh Shelly (16), Kolton Reynolds (17), Hagen Escoto (1)	Harris Field; Attendance: 1154; Umpires: HP: Drew Eaton, 1B: Kalen Hamlton, 2B: Casey Sanchez, 3B: Cody Whitehead, LF: Brad Merta, RF: Tyler Wall

==== Championship Game ====
Saturday, May 30, 6:30 pm at Harris Field – Game 19
Team	1	2	3	4	5	6	7	8	9	R	H	E
Taylor (IN)	0	0	0	1	2	0	0	0	0	3	7	5
Tennessee Wesleyan	0	4	3	4	0	0	4	6	X	21	22	1
WP: Cameron Goffar (10–3) LP: Lane Lewis (5–1); Home runs: Taylor: Brennan Frickel (11); TWU: Allan Gil Fernandez (16), Kolton Reynolds (18); Attendance: 2,219; Umpires: HP: Cody Whitehead, 1B: Casey Sanchez, 2B: Drew Eaton, 3B: Kalen Hamilton; Notes: The 18-run margin of victory is the largest in championship game history Boxscore

== See also ==
- 2026 NAIA softball tournament
- 2026 NCAA Division I baseball tournament
- 2026 NCAA Division II baseball tournament
- 2026 NCAA Division III baseball tournament
