= Larry Watkins (politician) =

American politician (1947–2024)

Member of the Mississippi House of Representatives from the 108th district
- In office January 7, 1992 – January 5, 1993
- Preceded by: Ezell Lee
- Succeeded by: Mark Formby

Personal details
- Born: Larry Elliott Watkins; September 4, 1947
- Died: October 2, 2024 (aged 77)
- Party: Republican (until 1991; c. 1999–2024); Democratic (1991–c. 1999)
- Spouse: Bonnie Clark
- Education: University of Southern Mississippi (BA, BSBA); William Carey College (MEd)
- Occupation: Educator; contractor; politician

Larry Elliott Watkins (September 4, 1947 – October 2, 2024) was an American politician. Elected to the Picayune, Mississippi city council in 1990, he won election as a Democrat to the Mississippi House of Representatives the following year. Despite Watkins winning election to a four-year term, a federal court panel mandated new redistricting and elections for every member of the state legislature in 1992, and he placed behind Republican nominee Mark Formby in a three-way race. Watkins later returned to the city council, serving from 2001 to 2013.
