= Zachary Grady =

American politician

Member of the Mississippi House of Representatives from the 115th district
- Incumbent
- Assumed office January 2, 2024
- Preceded by: Randall Patterson

Personal details
- Born: December 12, 1985 (age 40) Biloxi, Mississippi
- Party: Republican
- Spouse: Alison Lopez
- Education: William Carey University
- Occupation: Politician
- Profession: Law Enforcement

Zachary Grady serves as a member of the Mississippi House of Representatives for the 115th District, affiliating with the Republican Party, a position he has held since 2024.
