= Mike Seymour (Mississippi politician) =

American politician

Member of the Mississippi State Senate from the 47th district
- Incumbent
- Assumed office January 5, 2016
- Preceded by: Tony Smith

Personal details
- Born: April 15, 1959 (age 67)
- Party: Republican

Joseph M. "Mike" Seymour (born April 15, 1959) is an American politician who has served in the Mississippi State Senate from the 47th district since 2016.
