= 1969 NAIA World Series =

1969 NAIA baseball tournament
- 1969 NAIA World Series
- Teams: 8
- Format: Double elimination
- Finals site: Phil Welch Stadium; St. Joseph, Missouri
- Champions: William Carey (1st title)
- Winning coach: John O'Keefe
- MVP: Steve Barber (P) (La Verne)

The 1969 NAIA World Series was the 13th annual tournament hosted by the National Association of Intercollegiate Athletics to determine the national champion of baseball among its member colleges and universities in the United States and Canada.

The tournament was played at Phil Welch Stadium in St. Joseph, Missouri.

William Carey (29–9) defeated La Verne (38–16) in the championship series, 5–3, to win the Crusaders' first NAIA World Series. As of 2026, this is the earliest NAIA baseball championship won by a school that currently remains at the NAIA level.

La Verne pitcher Steve Barber was named tournament MVP.

== Bracket ==
First round	Second round	Semifinals	National Championship
Appalachian State	4
William Carey	8
William Carey	2
Glassboro State	1
Glassboro State	1
Grand Canyon	0
William Carey	4
La Verne	1
St. Cloud State	4
Taylor	0
St. Cloud State	2
La Verne	12
Kansas State Teachers	3
La Verne	12	William Carey	4	5
La Verne	10	3
Consolation first round	Consolation second round	Consolation third round	Consolation fourth round
St. Cloud State	5
Appalachian State	4	Grand Canyon	4	La Verne	17
Grand Canyon	9	St. Cloud State	5	St. Cloud State	6
Glassboro State	3
Glassboro State	3
Taylor	6	Taylor	2
Kansas State Teachers	5

== See also ==
- 1969 NCAA University Division baseball tournament
- 1969 NCAA College Division baseball tournament
