= Martin T. Smith =

American politician

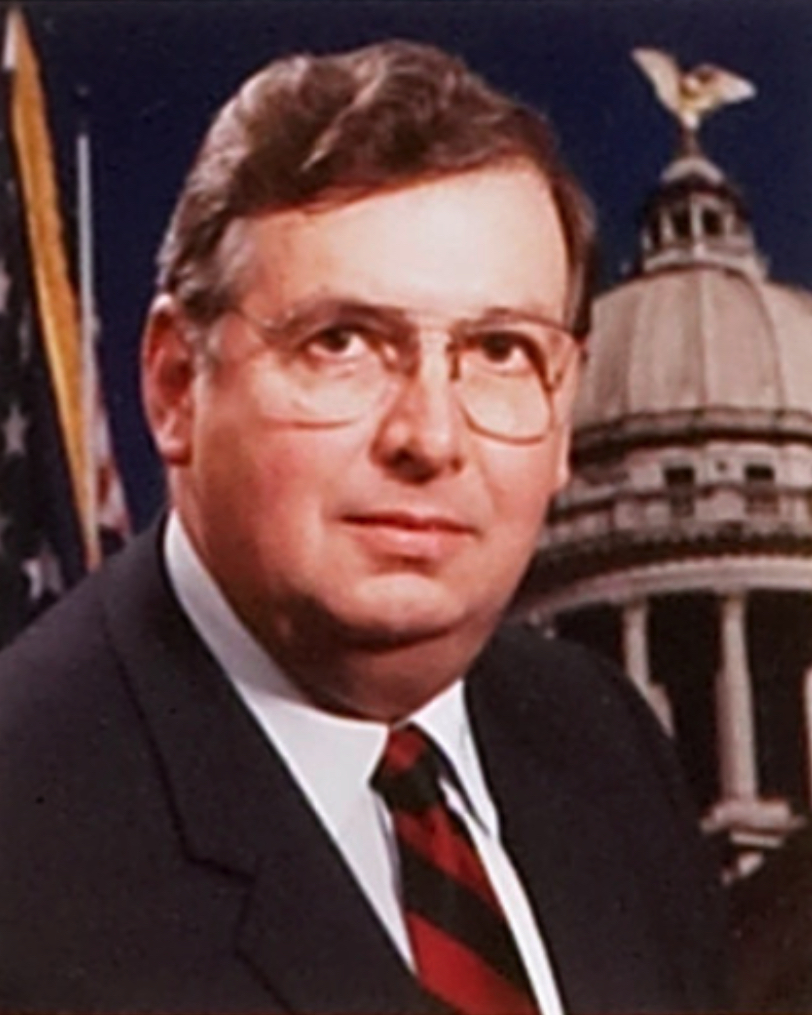
- Official portrait, 1984

Member of the Mississippi State Senate
- In office January 2, 1968 – January 5, 1988
- Preceded by: James A. Rester
- Succeeded by: Margaret Tate
- Constituency: 34th district (1968–1972); 31st district (1972–1980); 47th district (1980–1988)

Personal details
- Born: Martin Travis Smith; May 19, 1934 Poplarville, Mississippi, U.S.
- Died: February 26, 2015 (aged 80)
- Party: Democratic
- Spouse: Dolores Thomas
- Education: University of Mississippi (BS, JD)
- Occupation: Lawyer; politician

Martin Travis Smith (May 19, 1934 – February 26, 2015) was an American lawyer and politician.

Hailing from Poplarville, Mississippi, Smith attended Pearl River Community College and then received his bachelor's degree from the University of Mississippi and his law degree from the University of Mississippi School of Law. He then practiced law in Poplarville. From 1968 to 1988, Smith served in the Mississippi State Senate.
