= Mark Formby =

American politician

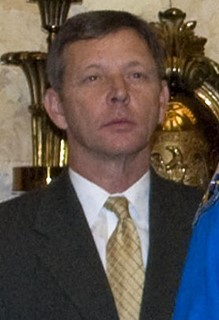
- Formby in 2010

Member of the Mississippi House of Representatives from the 108th district
- In office January 5, 1993 – April 14, 2017
- Preceded by: Larry Watkins
- Succeeded by: Stacey Hobgood-Wilkes

Personal details
- Born: August 16, 1956 (age 69) Starkville, Mississippi, U.S.
- Party: Republican

Mark S. Formby (born August 16, 1956) is an American politician. He served as a member of the Mississippi House of Representatives for the 108th district from 1993 to 2017. He is a member of the Republican Party.

== Career ==
In 2016, House Bill 50 was proposed that "would allow educators to teach several theories about how the universe was created" and "allow teachers to answer questions from students about their personal beliefs". According to The Huffington Post: "The bill doesn't mention creationism by name but refers specifically to biological evolution, the chemical origins of life, global warming and human cloning." Current law does not allow teachers to discuss their personal religious beliefs with students at school.

In 2015, Sen. Formby introduced House Bill 130, legislation to allow parents to decline vaccination for their children if it is against their personal beliefs. The Jackson Free Press reports: "Mississippi and West Virginia are the only two states in the nation that do not allow for vaccine exemptions based on either religious or philosophical reasons."

In 2017, Formby stepped down from the House to be the chairman of Mississippi Workers' Compensation.
