= Tony Smith (Mississippi politician) =

American politician

Member of the Mississippi State Senate from the 47th district
- In office January 3, 2012 – January 5, 2016
- Preceded by: Ezell Lee
- Succeeded by: Mike Seymour

Personal details
- Born: December 14, 1962 (age 63) Jackson, Mississippi, U.S.
- Party: Republican
- Spouse: Angie
- Children: 3
- Education: University of Southern Mississippi

Tony L. Smith (born December 14, 1962) is an American politician who served in the Mississippi State Senate from the 47th district from 2012 to 2016. A Republican, he defeated longtime incumbent Ezell Lee in the district's 2011 party primary, just months after Lee left the Democratic Party to run as a Republican. Smith previously won the Republican nomination to challenge Lee in 1999.
