= Ezell Lee =

American politician

Member of the Mississippi State Senate from the 47th district
- In office January 7, 1992 – January 3, 2012
- Preceded by: Margaret Tate
- Succeeded by: Tony Smith

Member of the Mississippi House of Representatives from the 108th district
- In office January 5, 1988 – January 7, 1992
- Preceded by: Margaret Tate
- Succeeded by: Larry Watkins

Personal details
- Born: April 9, 1933 Hancock County, Mississippi, U.S.
- Died: May 21, 2012 (aged 79) Jackson, Mississippi, U.S.
- Party: Republican (from 2011); Democratic (until 2011)
- Education: William Carey College; University of Southern Mississippi
- Occupation: Politician; educator

Ezell G. Lee (April 9, 1933 – May 21, 2012) was a member of the Mississippi Senate who represented the 47th district from 1992 to 2012. He served in the Mississippi House of Representatives from 1988 through 1992 as a member of the Democratic Party.

Lee switched parties on February 17, 2011 to become a Republican and lost the August Republican primary to Tony Smith. He died of cancer in 2012.
