= Margaret Tate =

American politician (died 2006)

Wootsie Tate

Member of the Mississippi State Senate from the 47th district
- In office January 5, 1988 – January 7, 1992
- Preceded by: Martin T. Smith
- Succeeded by: Ezell Lee

Member of the Mississippi House of Representatives from the 108th district
- In office January 3, 1984 – January 5, 1988
- Preceded by: Terrell Breland
- Succeeded by: Ezell Lee

Personal details
- Died: June 9, 2006 (aged 72)
- Party: Democratic
- Spouse: Billy Tate
- Children: 3

Margaret "Wootsie" Tate (died June 9, 2006) was a state legislator who served in the Mississippi House of Representatives and Mississippi Senate. She served in the house from 1984 to 1988 and in the senate from 1988 to 1992. A Democrat she lived in Picayune and represented Hancock County.

She was involved in insurance bills, legislation authorizing a landfill in Hancock County, and a mandatory seat belt law (it passed in the senate). She had a son and two daughters. In 2003, governor Ronnie Musgrove appointed her to the Mississippi Prison Industry Corporation.
