= Bryan University =

Private university in Tempe, Arizona

- Former names: Bryan Stenotype School, Bryan College
- Type: Private for-profit university
- Established: 1940; 86 years ago
- Founder: Mildred T. Bryan
- Parent institution: Alta Education LLC
- Accreditation: Northwest Commission on Colleges and Universities
- President: Eric Evans
- Students: 1,115
- Location: Tempe, Arizona, United States; 33.4378°N 111.9429°W
- Campus: Multiple sites
- Language: English
- Website: bryanuniversity.edu

Bryan University (BU) is a private for-profit university based in Tempe, Arizona. It has additional campuses in Toronto (Bryan College) and Portland, Oregon (Caregiver Training Institute).

== History ==
Bryan University was established in 1940 by Mildred T. Bryan. Bryan welcomed her first three students into her living room, which served as the initial classroom for the institution, originally named Bryan Stenotype School.

In 2005, under the parent company Alta Education, LLC, Bryan extended its reach by opening a campus in Sacramento, CA. With this new campus, Bryan University introduced additional degree programs.

== Accreditation ==
Bryan University is licensed by the Arizona State Board for Private Postsecondary Education and is accredited by the Northwest Commission on Colleges and Universities (NWCCU) to award diplomas, academic associate degrees, occupational associate degrees, bachelor's degrees, post-graduation certificates, and master's degrees.
