= William Carey University =

Christian university in Hattiesburg, Mississippi, US

- Former names: Pearl River Boarding School (1892–1905); South Mississippi College (1906–1911); Mississippi Woman's College (1911–1954); William Carey College (1954–2006)
- Motto: "Expect Great Things From God, Attempt Great Things For God"
- Type: Private university
- Established: 1892; 134 years ago
- Accreditation: SACS
- Religious affiliation: Baptist (Mississippi Baptist Convention)
- President: Ben Burnett
- Provost: Noal Cochran
- Academic staff: 190 full-time 230 part-time
- Students: 5,641
- Undergraduates: 3,264
- Location: Hattiesburg, Mississippi, United States; 31.3062°N 89.29116°W
- Campus: 120 acres (0.49 km^{2}); Small City
- Other campuses: Biloxi; Baton Rouge
- Colors: Red, Black & White
- Nickname: Crusaders
- Sporting affiliations: NAIA – SSAC
- Website: www.wmcarey.edu

William Carey University (Carey, William Carey, or WCU) is a private Christian university in Mississippi, United States. The institution is affiliated with the Southern Baptist Convention and the Mississippi Baptist Convention. The main campus is in Hattiesburg and a second campus is in the Tradition community north of Biloxi. The school gained official university status in 2006.

The university offers baccalaureate degrees, master's degrees, and doctoral degrees. William Carey opened its college of osteopathic medicine in 2009, welcoming its first class of 110 students in 2010. Prior to the fall of 2025, the academic year consisted of three trimesters of ten weeks each. Two summer sessions, a January Term, and a May Term are also offered. In fall 2025, William Carey switched to fall and spring semesters of sixteen weeks each, plus a summer session.

== History ==
William Carey University was founded by W. I. Thames in 1892 as Pearl River Boarding School in Poplarville, Mississippi. A disastrous fire destroyed the school in 1905, and in 1906, with the backing of a group of New Orleans businessmen, Thames reopened the school in Hattiesburg as South Mississippi College. Another fire destroyed the young institution, forcing it to close. In 1911, W. S. F. Tatum acquired the property and offered it as a gift to the Baptists, and the school reopened as Mississippi Woman's College. It would close again in 1940 due to the Great Depression but would reopen in 1946; in the interim, the facilities were used as officers' housing for nearby Camp Shelby.

In 1939, the school, then called the Mississippi Woman's College, took third place in the William Lowell Putnam Mathematical Competition, and it remains the only women's college to ever place in that competition.

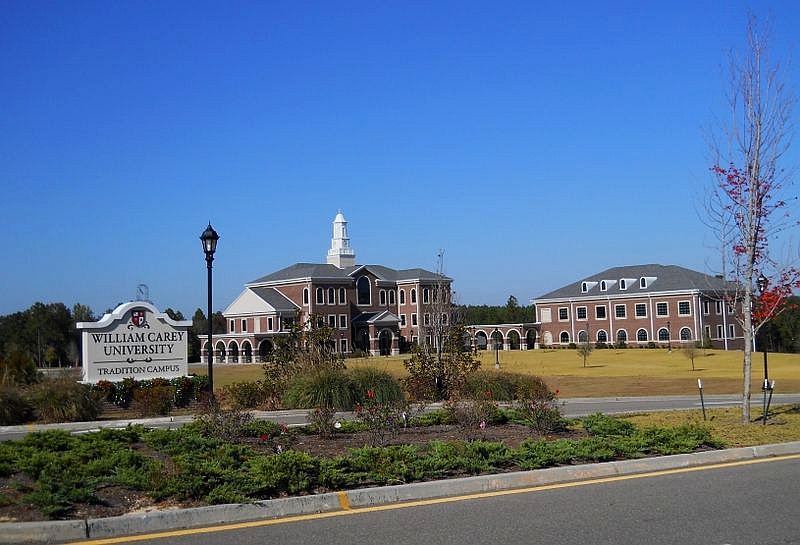
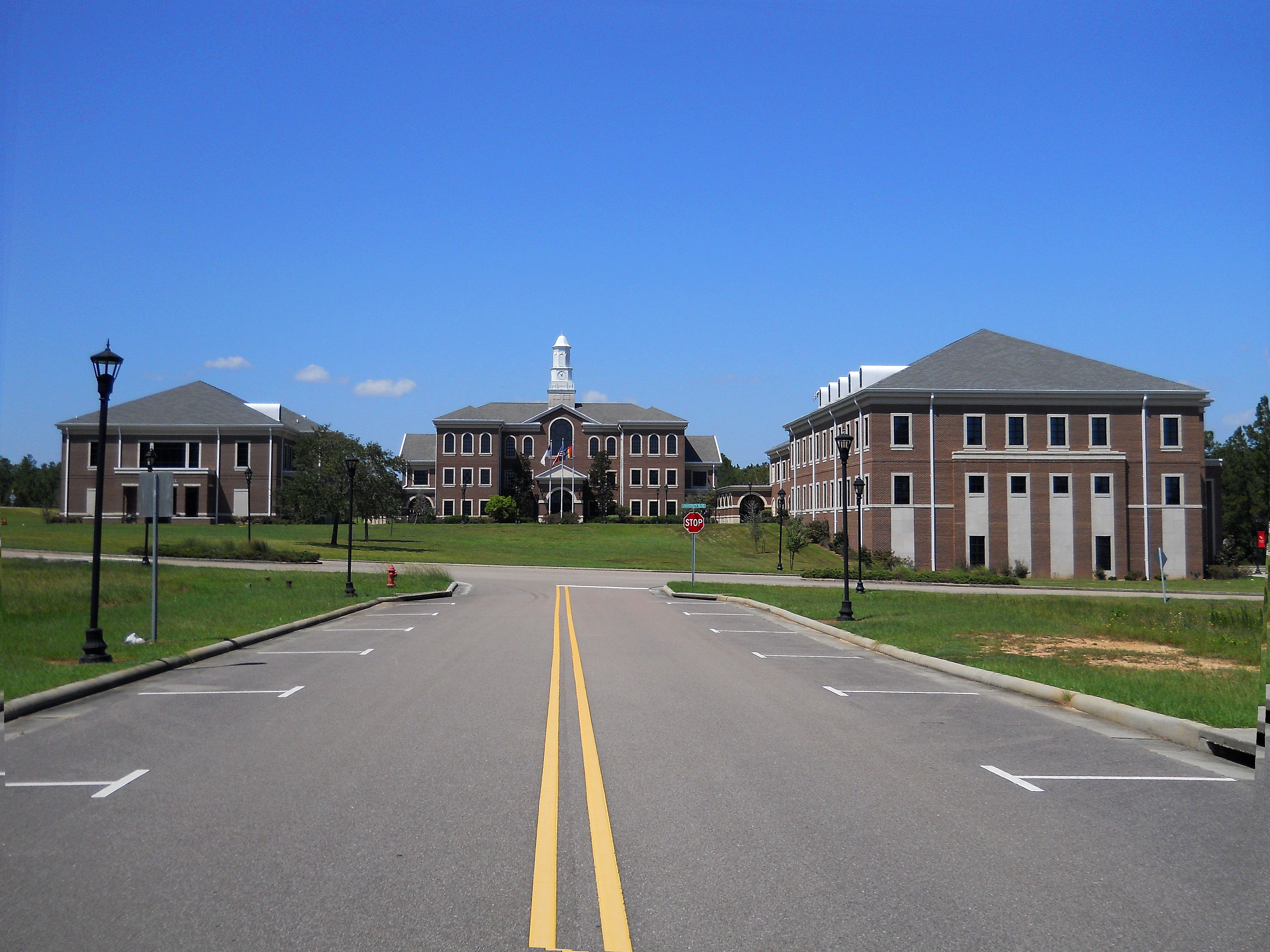
Tradition Campus, off Highway 67 in Harrison County, Mississippi

In 1953, the Mississippi Baptist Convention voted to make the college coeducational, which necessitated a new name. In 1954, the board of trustees selected the name William Carey College in honor of William Carey, the 18th-century English linguist whose decades of missionary activity in India earned him international recognition as the "Father of Modern Missions."

In 1968, William Carey announced a merger with the Mather School of Nursing in New Orleans.

In 1976, the college purchased the Gulf Coast Military Academy campus in Gulfport. The beachfront property was devastated by Hurricane Katrina in August 2005 and classes were held in other facilities until the William Carey University-Tradition Campus opened in August 2009. Located off Highway 67 in Biloxi, it is the center of the 4,800-acre Tradition Planned Community.

On August 14, 2006, William Carey University celebrated its centennial. This day also marked the transition of William Carey College to William Carey University. On January 21, 2017, the William Carey University College of Osteopathic Medicine was severely damaged after being struck by an EF3 tornado, as was nearly every building on campus.

== Accreditation ==
William Carey University is accredited by the Commission on Colleges of the Southern Association of Colleges and Schools to award bachelor's, master's, specialist and doctoral degrees. It is also accredited by the International Assembly for Collegiate Business Education (IACBE) for its business and management programs offered through the School of Business.

The William Carey University College of Osteopathic Medicine is the 29th osteopathic medical school in the United States. Upon the graduation of its inaugural class in 2014, the school was fully accredited by the American Osteopathic Association's Commission on Osteopathic College Accreditation.

William Carey University's School of Business has the following degree programs accredited by the International Assembly for Collegiate Business Education: Master of Business Administration, Bachelor of Science in Business Administration with concentrations in: Accounting, Finance, Computer Information Systems, Management/Marketing, Workforce Training and Management.

== Recognition ==
In the 2017 edition of U.S. News & World Report America's Best Colleges, William Carey University was ranked No. 2 Best Value among regional universities in the South for the second consecutive year. In 2015, William Carey University was ranked No. 1 Best Value among regional universities in the South.

== Academics ==
=== WCU College of Osteopathic Medicine ===
On October 23, 2007, the board of trustees at William Carey University (WCU) unanimously voted to authorize Tommy King, president, to employ a dean for the College of Osteopathic Medicine (COM). The rationale was to open the COM to address the severe shortage of physicians in Mississippi and surrounding states and to impact the healthcare of rural Mississippians. The college was officially established on March 3, 2008. It was awarded provisional accreditation by the American Osteopathic Association's Commission on Osteopathic College Accreditation at its meeting September 12–13, 2009. In August 2010, the university welcomed its inaugural class of 110 medical students. The World Directory of Medical Schools lists the school as a US medical school along with other accredited US MD and DO programs.

The William Carey University College of Osteopathic Medicine is the state's second medical school and the first in the region to focus on osteopathic medicine and grant the Doctor of Osteopathic Medicine degree. The medical college graduated its first class in 2014.

=== School of Music and Ministry Studies ===
The Winters School of Music is an accredited institutional member of the National Association of Schools of Music. The music therapy program is accredited by the American Music Therapy Association. In February 2018, William Carey University became the first All-Steinway School in the state of Mississippi.

=== Department of Theatre & Communication and Carey Dinner Theatre ===
William Carey University's Department of Theatre & Communication began in 1915 by Kate Downs P'Pool. Since 1994, the department has become actively involved in the Kennedy Center American College Theater Festival. In 2001, William Carey's production of And David Danced was selected for presentation at the National Kennedy Center/American College Theatre Festival in Washington, D.C. In the same year, the department was honored with the Mississippi Governor's Award for Excellence in the Arts. The department has also twice taken faculty and students to Nairobi, Kenya to produce the musical Smoke on the Mountain. The department produces three productions per year, normally a drama, a children's theatre piece, and a comedy or musical. Their venue is the Joe and Virginia Tatum Theatre.

Carey Dinner Theatre began in 1974 as the "Carey Summer Showcase" under the management of Obra Quave. The longest-running dinner theatre in the state of Mississippi (30+ years), CDT brings professional summer theatre to WCU and the surrounding community. Two CDT alumni (Phillip Fortenberry and Keith Thompson) have gone onto professional Broadway music careers. CDT produces two shows per summer, normally light-hearted comedies or musicals.

=== School of Nursing ===
The Joseph and Nancy Fail School of Nursing is accredited by the Commission on Collegiate Nursing Education and approved by Institutions of Higher Learning of the State of Mississippi and, in New Orleans, the Louisiana State Board of Nursing.

=== School of Pharmacy ===
The School of Pharmacy matriculated its inaugural class starting in July 2018. It has received approval for Continuing Accreditation Status from the Accreditation Council for Pharmacy Education (ACPE) through June 30, 2027.

The inaugural class of 58 students had orientation at the Tradition Campus on July 19-20th of 2018. The three-story, 33,000-square-foot Pharmacy Building has a price tag of $7 million. Carey has an accelerated program that last 2 years and 10 months. Students will be taking classes year-round in four terms of 11 weeks each. The School of Pharmacy is one of only 11 accelerated Doctor of Pharmacy programs in the nation. It is the only such program on the Gulf Coast comprising southern Mississippi, southwestern Alabama, and southeastern Louisiana.

== Student life ==
The Student Government Association hosts Welcome Week, Homecoming Week (along with the Alumni office), and various activities throughout the year. In addition to activities, the SGA works as a liaison between the students and administration.

William Carey University operates in accordance with its Baptist affiliation and has many programs for its 4000 students. CareyBSU offers Bible studies, ministry to the surrounding area and apartments, mission opportunities, and "Priority Lunch." It also offers CampusLink which is a worship service time.

The university is served by a newspaper, The Cobbler, which publishes once a month and alternates between a print and online edition. The Cobbler has been in existence since the 1950s; prior to the name change to WCU, it was known as The Scissors and operated from the 1920s until the 1950s.

The name of the yearbook is The Crusader (it was known as The Pine Burr in the MWC days). There is also a literary magazine, The Indigo and an alumni magazine, Carey.

=== Greek life ===
Three Christian-oriented organizations exist on campus. Gamma Chi is one sorority focused on sisterhood and service. Gamma Chi's colors are red, black, and white and the mascot is a panda. Pi Omega is a social and service sorority. Kappa Tau Xi is a social and service fraternity. There are two music fraternities on campus, those being The Nu Xi chapter of Phi Mu Alpha Sinfonia, and the Omicron Sigma chapter of Delta Omicron.

== Athletics ==
The William Carey athletic teams are called the Crusaders. The university is a member of the National Association of Intercollegiate Athletics (NAIA), primarily competing in the Southern States Athletic Conference (SSAC; formerly known as Georgia–Alabama–Carolina Conference (GACC) until after the 2003–04 school year) since the 2010–11 academic year. The Crusaders previously competed in the Gulf Coast Athletic Conference (GCAC) from 1981–82 to 2009–10.

William Carey competes in 18 intercollegiate varsity sports: Men's sports include baseball, basketball, cross country, golf, soccer, tennis and track & field; while women's sports include basketball, beach volleyball, cross country, golf, soccer, softball, tennis, track & field and volleyball; and co-ed sports include archery and cheerleading.

=== National championships ===
Sport	Association	Division	Year	Runner-up	Score
Baseball (1)	NAIA (1)	Single (1)	1969	La Verne	5–3

2018 Women's Soccer

2020 Men's Indoor Track and Field

== Notable alumni ==
- Dan Jennings (Class of 1984), former manager of the Miami Marlins of Major League Baseball.
- Ezell Lee politician in the Mississippi House of Representatives and Mississippi Senate.
- Chris McDaniel (Class of 1994), attorney and Republican politician in the Mississippi Senate since 2008.
- Michael Parker (Class of 1978) politician in the U.S. House of Representatives and former Assistant Secretary of the Army for Civil Works under President George W. Bush.
- Larkin I. Smith former police chief, county sheriff, and Republican politician in the U.S. House of Representatives from January 1989 until his death
- John Stephenson retired Major League Baseball player who was a catcher from 1964 to 1973.
- Richard C. Vinci, retired United States Navy admiral and former commander of the United States Navy Dental Corps
