= List of California State University, Northridge people =

This page lists notable alumni and former students, faculty, and administrators of California State University, Northridge.

== Administrators ==
- Dick Dull – athletic director
- Dick Enberg – sportscaster and college administrator
- S. K. Ramesh – electrical engineer and university administrator
- Ruth Simmons – former president of Prairie View A&M University, Brown University, and Smith College
- Thor Steingraber – opera and theater director, and arts administrator

== Alumni ==
=== Academia ===
- Eric V. Anslyn – distinguished professor of chemistry at the University of Texas at Austin
- Judy Baca – professor of Chicana/o Studies and professor of World Arts and Cultures at UCLA
- Jeffrey Beall – librarian at the University of Colorado Denver
- Betty Beaumont – conceptual artist who has served on the faculty of the University of California at Berkeley, The School of the Art Institute of Chicago, SUNY, Purchase, Hunter College, New York University, and Columbia University
- Michael Ferejohn – professor of philosophy at Duke University
- Lori Cox Han – professor of political science at Chapman University
- Jack C. Hayya (1929–2018) – professor of management science at the Pennsylvania State University
- Judith H. Hibbard – senior researcher and professor at the University of Oregon
- Michael Klonsky – activist, professor of education at Loyola University Chicago
- David C. Lane – author, professor of philosophy and sociology
- Ralph Larkin – sociologist, assistant professor of sociology at Rutgers University, Newark and adjunct professor at John Jay College of Criminal Justice
- Minnette Gersh Lenier – teacher who used magic to improve students’ learning skills
- Shari McMahan – health sciences educator and president of Eastern Washington University
- Kathleen Lowe Melde – professor of electrical engineering and associate dean at the University of Arizona
- Annette Nellen – professor; director of the graduate tax program at the San José State University
- Peter W. Schramm – professor of political science at Ashland University
- Alex Sevanian – professor of molecular pharmacology and toxicology at University of Southern California
- Chauntelle Tibbals – sociologist specialized in gender and sexualities
- Barbara Tilley – professor of biostatistics at Case Western Reserve University, the Medical University of South Carolina, and the UTHealth School of Public Health
- Robert H. Todd – professor of mechanical engineering at Brigham Young University
- C. Richard Tracy – ecologist and professor of biology at University of Nevada, Reno
- Ann E. Watkins – professor of mathematics at California State University, Northridge
- Mark Watson – professor of economics and public affairs at Princeton University, previously at Harvard University and Northwestern University

=== Business ===
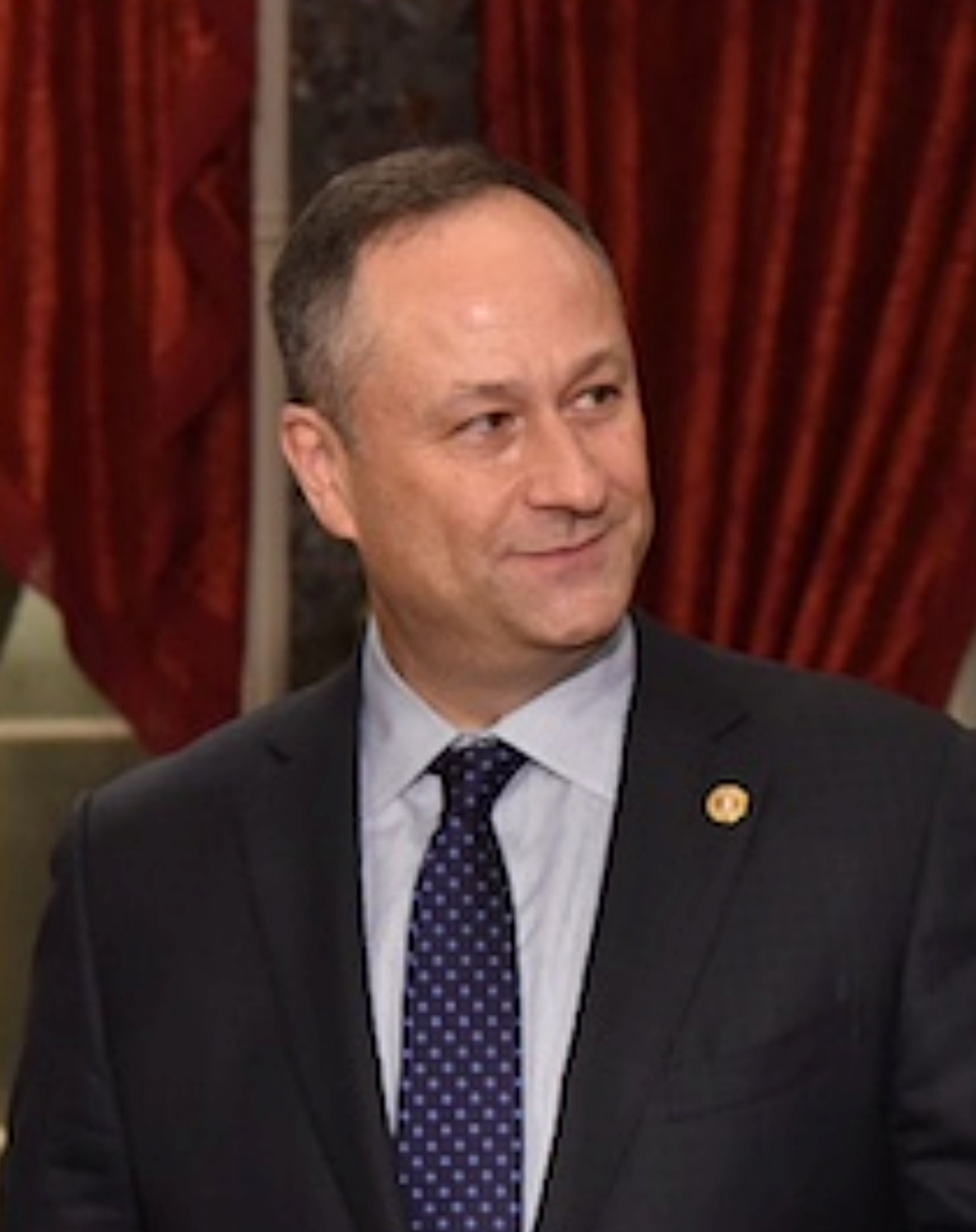
Doug Emhoff

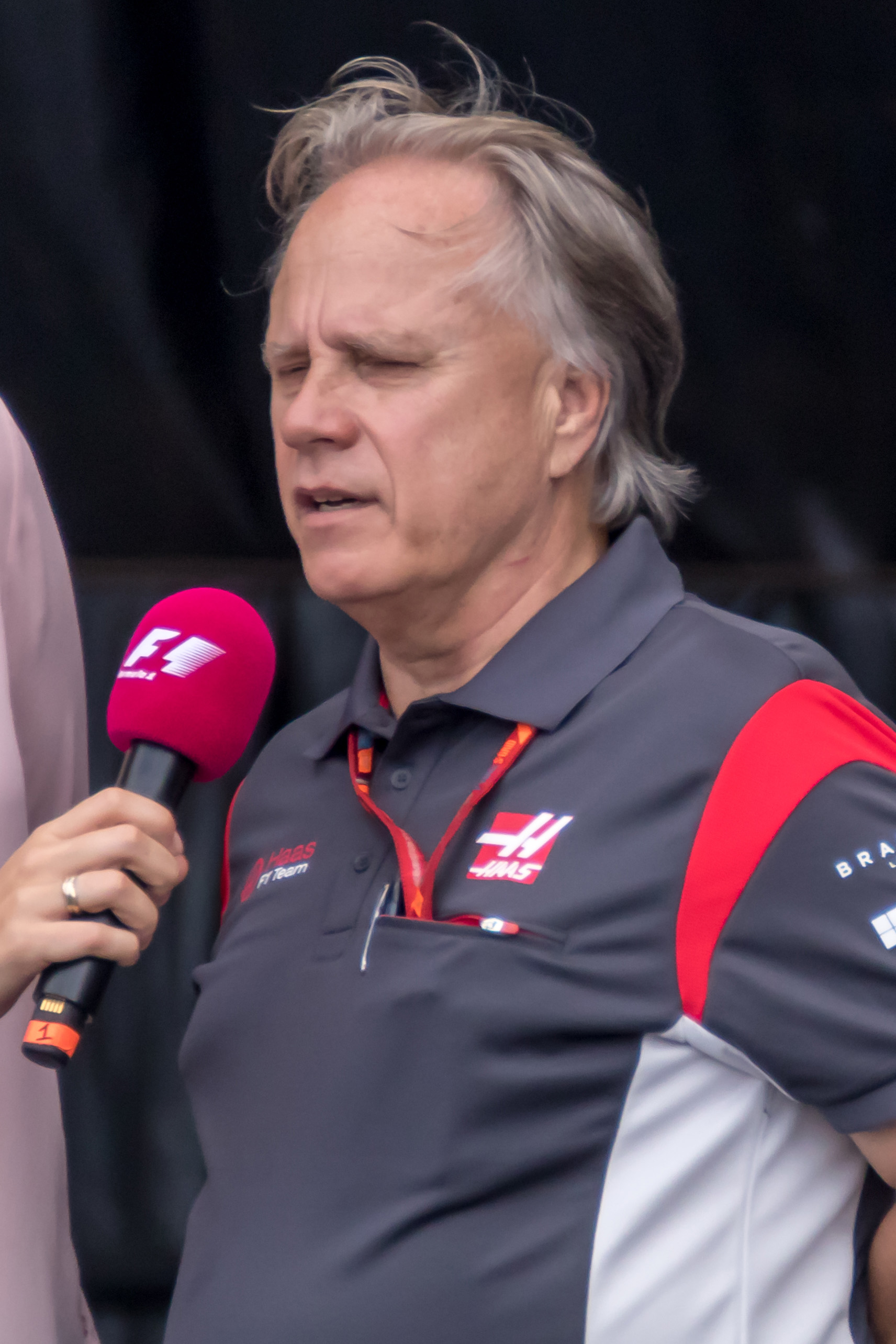
Gene Haas

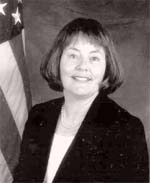
Kathleen Utgoff

- Andrew Anagnost – president and CEO of Autodesk
- Vincent Barabba – market researcher and former head of the United States Census Bureau
- Gene Baur – president and co-founder of Farm Sanctuary
- Jim Berk – CEO of Participant Media (An Inconvenient Truth, Bridge of Spies, Green Book, Spotlight)
- Stephen Bollenbach (1960) – co-chairman and CEO of Hilton Hotels
- Wendi Deng Murdoch – media executive, wife of News Corp Chairman Rupert Murdoch
- Doug Emhoff – entertainment lawyer, former Second Gentleman of the United States, husband of Kamala Harris
- Christine Essel – senior vice president, Paramount Pictures
- Jon V. Ferrara – entrepreneur and founder of Nimble
- Dirk Gates – founder and CEO of Xircom and Xirrus
- Gene Haas – NASCAR team owner; Haas F1 Solo owner; Haas Automation president
- Jerry Jordan – former member of President Ronald Reagan's Council of Economic Advisers and former president and chief executive officer of the Federal Reserve Bank of Cleveland
- Cameron Kashani – Iranian-American entrepreneur, coach, speaker, and advisor
- Fumi Kitahara – publicist for Walt Disney Studios and Dreamworks
- Rao Machiraju – executive in residence and co-director of Center for Human Applied Reasoning and the Internet of Things (Chariot) at the University of Southern California, former CEO of ReQall.
- David Nazarian – businessman and philanthropist, founder and CEO of Nîmes Capital
- Charles Noski – CFO of AT&T, Northrop Grumman Corporation, and Bank of America
- Nick Patsaouras – businessman, engineer, and public official
- Steve Pavlina – self-development professional
- Dan Pena – businessman
- Stan Polovets – led the $15bn merge and $55bn sale of TNK-BP, lead director on the board of L1 Energy and chairman at Edelman
- Vicki Roberts – attorney, on-air legal commentator, television and film personality
- Ravi Sawhney – industrial designer, founder and CEO of RKS Design
- Amanda Simpson – vice president for research and technology at Airbus Americas
- Lee Soo-Man – founder and chairman of SM Entertainment
- Kathleen Utgoff – economist and commissioner of the Bureau of Labor Statistics
- Michelle Vicary – executive vice president of programming and network publicity for Crown Media
- Frank K. Wheaton – attorney, sports agent and personal manager
- Alex Yemenidjian – chairman and CEO of Metro-Goldwyn-Mayer, Inc.

=== Film and television ===
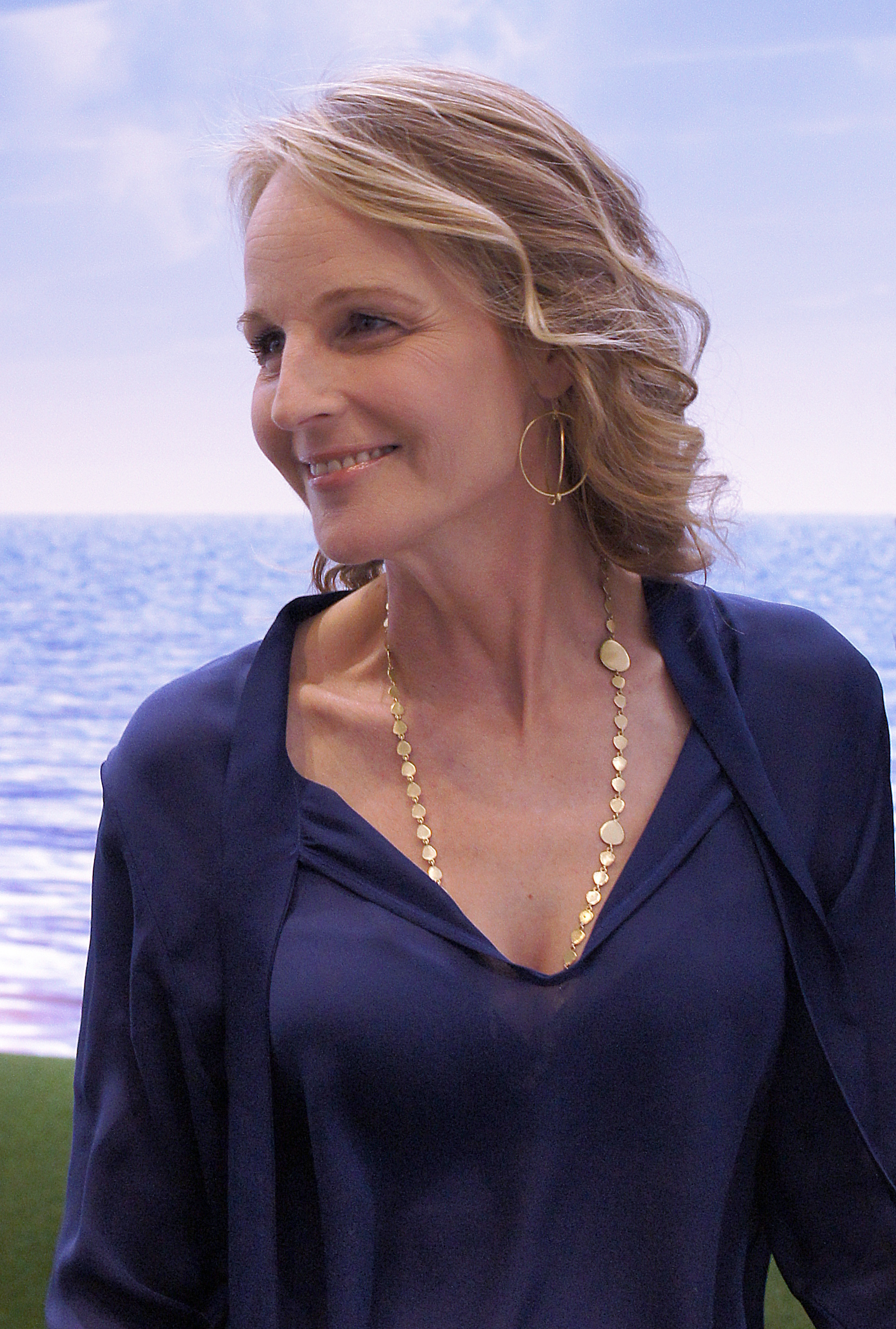
Helen Hunt

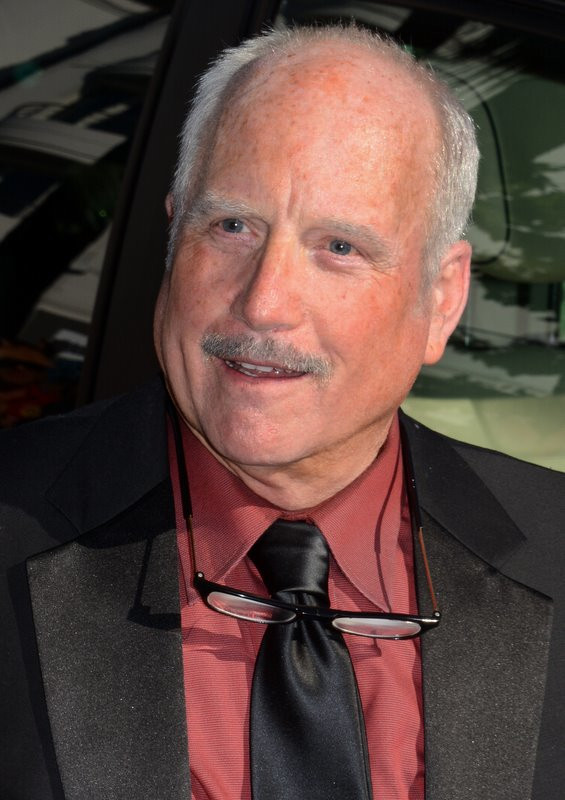
Richard Dreyfuss

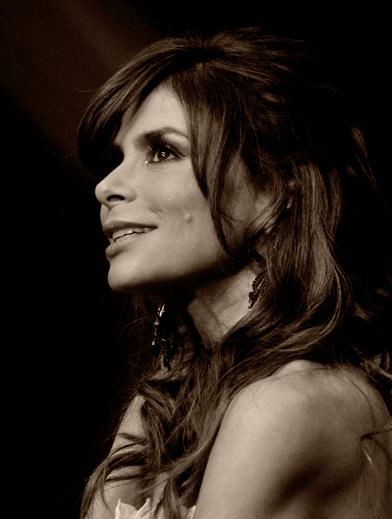
Paula Abdul

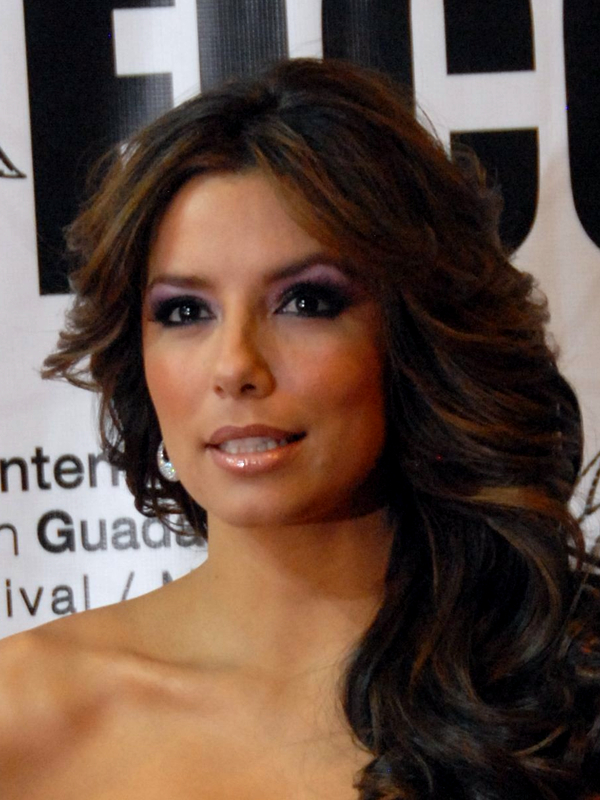
Eva Longoria

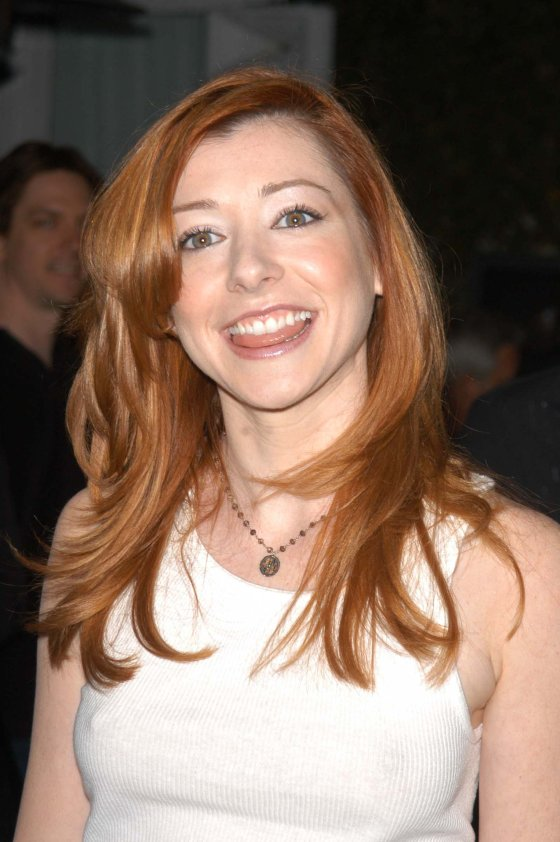
Alyson Hannigan

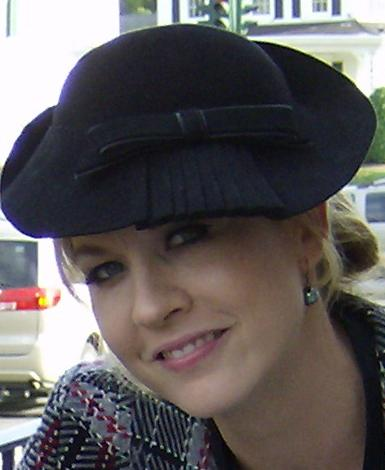
Jenna Elfman

- Paula Abdul (attended) – entertainer; singer, dancer, judge for television series American Idol and The X Factor; winner of multiple MTV Video Music Awards, Grammy Awards, and Emmy Awards
- Ariane Andrew (2005) – wrestler
- David Michael Barrett (1992) – screenwriter and film producer
- Anna Behlmer – Academy Award-nominated sound engineer
- Deanne Bray (1989) – actress
- Kimberly J. Brown – actress
- Dave Caplan – television writer and producer
- Charmian Carr – actress
- Joan Chen, BA 1979 – actress, filmmaker
- Morris Chestnut (1987) – film and television actor
- Karin Anna Cheung (1992) – actress
- Kristen Cloke – actress
- Kevin Corcoran (1967) – actor, entertainment producer-director
- Mike Darnell – television executive
- Bobby Diamond – actor and attorney
- Richard Dreyfuss (1965) – actor, winner of an Academy Award, a Golden Globe, and a BAFTA
- Jenna Elfman – film and television actress known for Dharma and Greg, Golden Globe winner
- Robert Englund – actor best known for his role as Freddy Krueger
- Diane Franklin – film and television actress
- Teri Garr (attended) – film actress, comedian, Academy Award nominee
- Alexandra Grey (2013) – film and television actress, singer
- Don Hahn, BA 1975 – film producer, film director; film producer of Beauty and the Beast, The Lion King, The Hunchback of Notre Dame. Golden Globe winner
- Alyson Hannigan (1992) – actress
- Phil Hartman (1966) – film and television actor, comedian, producer
- Linda Kaye Henning – film and television actress
- Helen Hunt (1981) – film and television actress
- Paul Hunter – film director, screenwriter, and music video director
- David Knoller – television producer, director and writer
- Dale Launer – screenwriter
- Lillian Lehman – film and television actor
- Nicole Linkletter – Cycle 5 America's Next Top Model winner
- Eva Longoria – actress
- Cheech Marin – actor, comedian, co-star of Cheech and Chong film and television team
- Austin Matelson (aka Luchasaurus), BA 2008, MA 2010 – professional wrestler
- Al Mayer Jr. – 2x Academy Award and Emmy Award-winning camera designer
- Braddon Mendelson – filmmaker and playwright
- Eva Mendes – actress
- Jillian Michaels – personal trainer and Biggest Loser coach
- Brian A. Miller – senior vice president and general manager of Cartoon Network Studios. Emmy Award-winning television producer
- Michelle Mizner – Academy Award-winning film producer and editor
- David Mullich – game designer and producer
- Arsi Nami – Swedish-Persian actor, singer, songwriter, music therapist and philanthropist
- Robert Newman – actor, Guiding Light
- Harry Northup – actor, Taxi Driver and The Silence of the Lambs; poet, "Red Snow Fence"
- Cubby O'Brien (1955–59) – musician; drummer, original member ("Mouseketeer") of The Mickey Mouse Club
- Utt Panichkul – actor and model
- Donald Petrie – actor and film director
- Chuck Pfarrer – screenwriter, author, former SEAL Team commander
- Eve Plumb (1976) – actress, "Jan" on The Brady Bunch
- Lauren Ridloff – actress, Tony Award nominee
- Robbie Rist – actor and musician, "Cousin Oliver" on The Brady Bunch
- Mark Saul – actor, All That, Grey's Anatomy, The Social Network
- Deborah Lynn Scott – costume designer and set designer
- Jean Bruce Scott – actress
- Scott Shaw (1976) – author, actor, filmmaker
- Lloyd Sherr – voice actor
- Jenny Shimizu – actress and model
- Charles Martin Smith – actor and director
- Phil Snyder – voice actor; voice of Disney character Jiminy Cricket; professor, University of Houston
- James Stanfield – professor and film producer, won the Academy Award for Technical Achievement
- Jeri Taylor – co-creator of Star Trek: Voyager
- Brian J. Terwilliger (1994) – producer/director of One Six Right
- Jennifer Tisdale – actress
- Tim Toyama – playwright, producer
- DJ Trevi – actor, DJ, reality personality, director
- Minoti Vaishnav – singer, screenwriter and producer
- Larry Wilcox – actor
- Debra Winger – film and stage actress

=== Government and politics ===
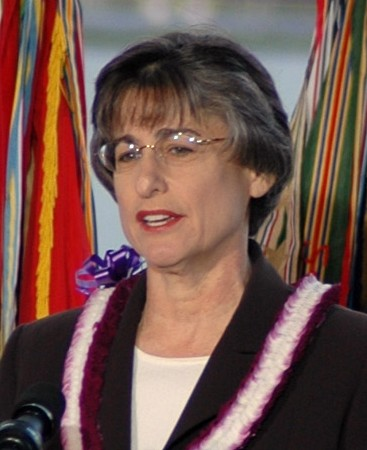
Linda Lingle

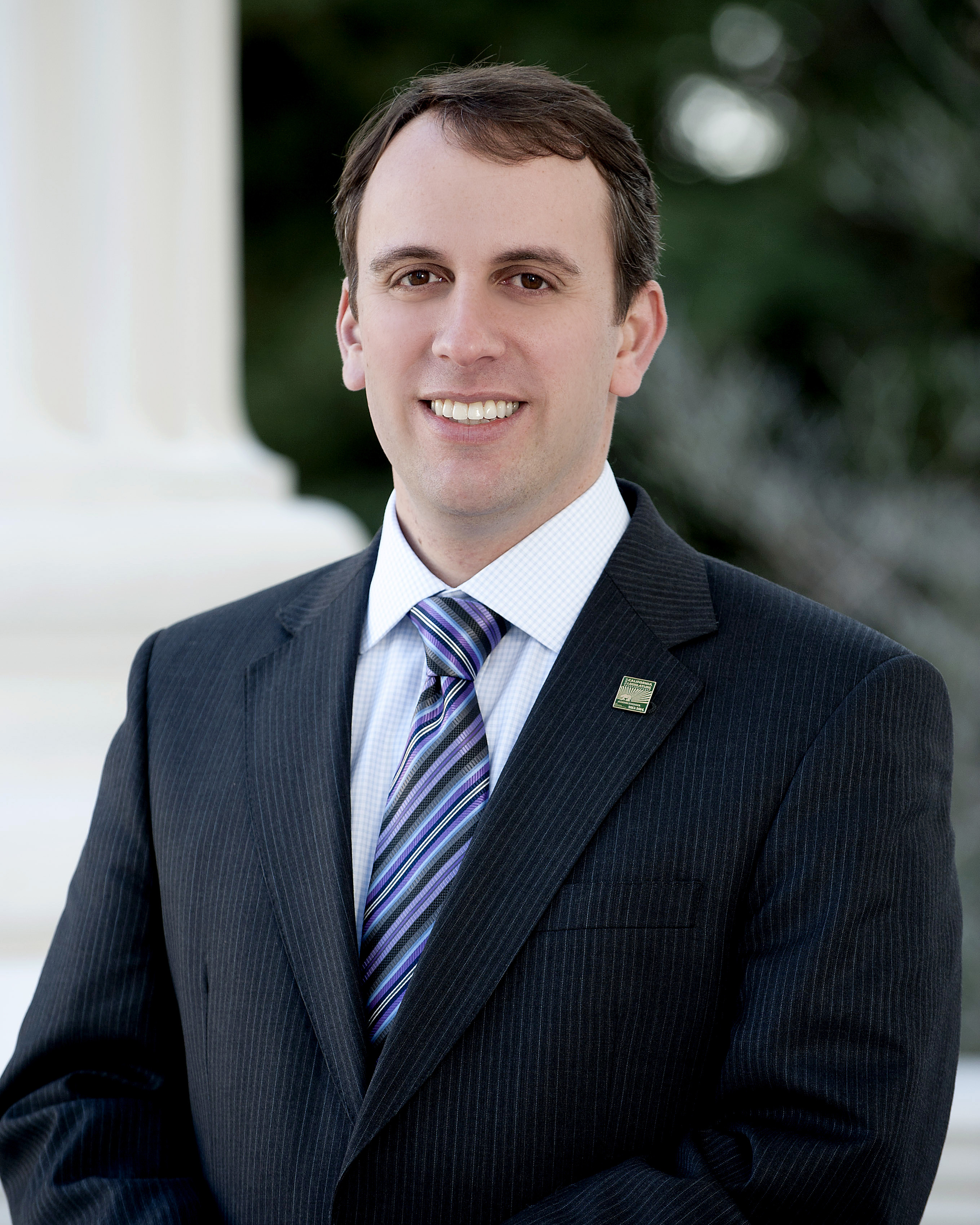
Marc Levine

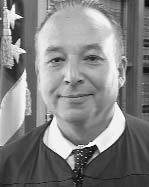
S. James Otero

- Richard Alarcon (1971) – former California state senator and Los Angeles City Council member
- Nicole Avant – 13th United States Ambassador to the Bahamas
- Judy Baca (1964) – artist, civil rights activist, Guggenheim Fellow
- Christopher Bogdan – retired United States Air Force general
- Katie Eyre Brewer – member of the Oregon House of Representatives from the 29th district
- Kansen Chu – member of the San Jose City Council from the 4th District, member of the California State Assembly from 25th Assembly District
- Lance Clow – member of the Idaho House of Representatives from the 24th District
- Mike Curb (1962) – musician, record company executive, 42nd lieutenant governor of California
- Mike Davis – president pro tem, Los Angeles Board of Public Works and former member of the California State Assembly
- Jamshid "Jimmy" Delshad (1958) – mayor of Beverly Hills
- Tara Flanagan – judge of the Superior Court of the State of California in the County of Alameda
- Katie Hill – former Democratic member of the United States House of Representatives, representative of California's 25th congressional district
- George J. Hochbrueckner – member of the New York State Assembly, member of the United States House of Representatives for New York's 1st congressional district
- Brent A. Jones (born 1963) – Republican member of the Nevada Assembly.
- Ida B. Kinney – civil rights activist and teacher
- Jeanne Kohl-Welles – member of the Washington State Senate and Washington House of Representatives from the 36th legislative district
- Charlotte Laws – author, politician and animal rights advocate
- Ralph Lazo – only known non-spouse, non-Japanese American who voluntarily relocated to a World War II Japanese American internment camp
- John Lee – member of the Los Angeles City Council representing the 12th district
- Marc Levine – member of the California State Assembly from the 10th District
- Linda Lingle – former governor of Hawaii
- Mark! Lopez – activist and winner of the Goldman Environmental Prize
- Bob Marshall – member of the Virginia House of Delegates from the 13th District
- Nury Martinez – former president of the Los Angeles City Council representing the 6th district
- Caroline Menjivar – member of California State Senate
- Esha Momeni – Iranian-American women's rights activist
- Kevin Murray – former California State Assemblyman and senator
- S. James Otero – U.S. District Court judge
- Imelda Padilla – member of the Los Angeles City Council
- William Paparian – lawyer and former mayor of Pasadena, California
- Fran Pavley – first mayor of Agoura Hills, member of the California State Assembly for the 41st District, and member of the California State Senate from the 27th District and 23rd District
- Rick Rollens – former secretary, California State Senate; autism health and research activist
- Peter W. Schramm – director of the Center for International Education in the United States Department of Education during the Reagan Administration
- Amanda Simpson – test pilot, former executive director of the U.S. Army Office of Energy Initiatives (OEI) and deputy assistant secretary of Defense for Operational Energy (became the first openly transgender female presidential appointee)
- Scott Svonkin – politician
- Bob Thorpe – member of the Arizona House of Representatives from the 6th District
- Kathleen Utgoff – economist and commissioner of the Bureau of Labor Statistics
- Suzette Martinez Valladares – politician elected to the California Assembly
- Alex Villanueva – 33rd sheriff of Los Angeles County, California
- Lorie Zapf – member of the San Diego City Council for the Sixth District and Second District

=== Journalism ===
- Marc Cooper – journalist and academic
- Frank del Olmo – editor, columnist and reporter for the Los Angeles Times, winner of an Emmy Award and Pulitzer Prize for Public Service
- Barbara Fairchild – food journalist and editor-in-chief of Bon Appétit
- Tod Goldberg – author and journalist
- Bill Griffeth (BA 1980) – anchor (Closing Bell) and financial journalist on CNBC
- Bill Handel – KFI morning talk show host, attorney
- Sue Herera (BA 1980) – anchor (Power Lunch) and financial journalist on CNBC
- Robert Hilburn (BA 1961) – music critic for the Los Angeles Times
- Ron Insana – analyst on CNBC
- Ana Kasparian (2004) – internet personality, co-host of The Young Turks, professor of journalism
- Ken Lubas – photographer, photojournalist, winner of two Pulitzer Prizes
- Rory Markas – play-by-play announcer for the Los Angeles Angels of Anaheim
- A Martinez – journalist and radio host
- Paul Pringle – winner of a George Polk Award, Worth Bingham Prize, Pulitzer Prize for Public Service, and Pulitzer Prize for Investigative Journalism
- Rip Rense – writer and journalist at the Los Angeles Times
- D. Scott Rogo – writer and journalist
- Anita Sarkeesian (2002) – blogger, media critic
- Barbara Starr – television news journalist
- James Taranto – columnist for the Wall Street Journal

=== Literature ===
- René Colato Laínez (1989) – children's book author
- Kenneth G. Eade (1977) – author of legal thrillers and spy fiction
- Donald Freed – playwright, novelist, and screenwriter
- David Gerrold – science fiction author and screenwriter
- Andy Luckey – television producer, children's book author and illustrator
- Dale McGowan – author, educator, and philanthropist
- Lawrence M. Schoen (1983) – science fiction author

=== Music ===
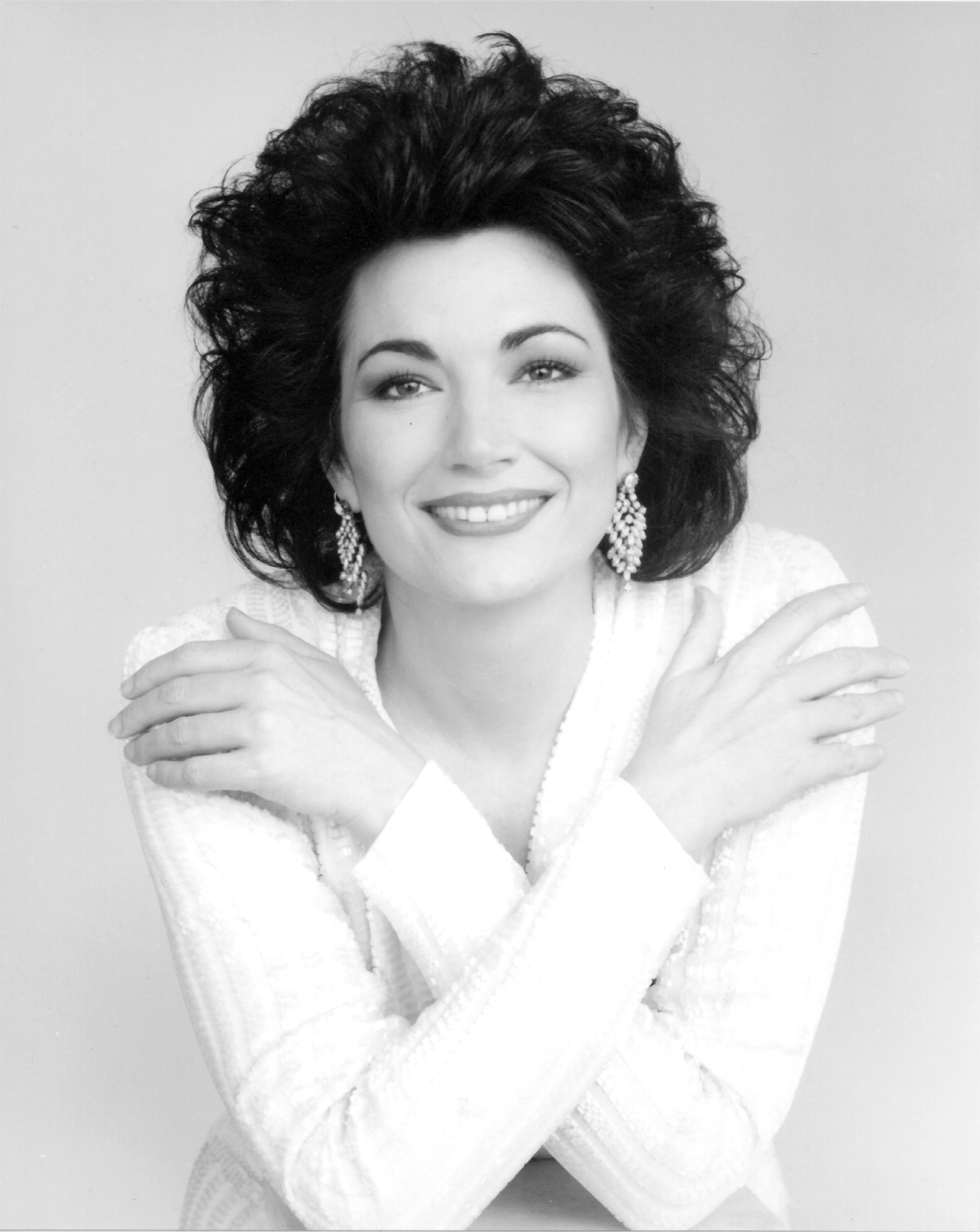
Carol Vaness

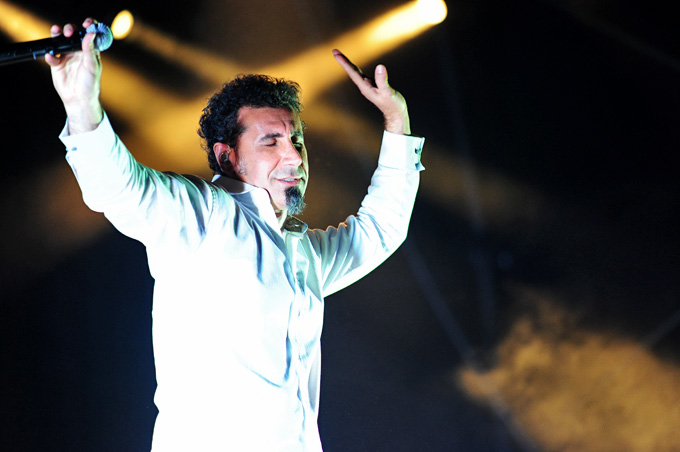
Serj Tankian

- Cristian Amigo – composer, guitarist, and ethnomusicologist
- Tigran Arakelyan – conductor
- Mark Balderas (1982) – musician, keyboardist and songwriter with the rock band Human Drama
- Richard Campbell – bass guitarist and vocalist
- Tony Clements – musician and tubist
- Mike Curb (1962) – musician, record company executive
- John Densmore (1962) – musician, former drummer of The Doors
- Michelle DeYoung – classical vocalist and opera singer
- John Doan – musician
- Daryl Dragon (1960) – "The Captain" of the Grammy Award-winning Captain & Tennille
- Mike Elizondo – Grammy Award-winning record producer (Eminem, Alanis Morissette, Pink, Natasha Bedingfield, Twenty One Pilots)
- James Fortune (1996) – musician, gospel singer
- Grant Geissman (1974) – guitarist, session guitarist, composer, recording artist
- Troy Glass – rapper, song writer
- Scheila Gonzalez – saxophonist
- Gordon Goodwin – big band composer, arranger, and saxophonist
- Andy Grammer (2007) – singer
- Kalani – musician, percussionist
- Fred Katz – jazz cellist
- Kariné Poghosyan – pianist
- Jim Pons (1961) – musician, bass guitarist and singer for The Leaves, The Turtles, and The Mothers of Invention
- Jeannie G. Pool – music producer and composer
- Louis Posen – punk rock music producer and record label founder
- Kentaro Sato – musician, composer
- Maia Sharp – singer, songwriter
- Toshiyuki Shimada (1977) – music director, conductor and professor, Yale Symphony Orchestra, Eastern Connecticut Symphony Orchestra, Yale School of Music
- Sebu Simonian – singer, songwriter, keyboardist, producer, half of the Los Angeles-based indie pop duo Capital Cities
- Leland Sklar – musician, session bassist
- Andy Summers – musician, guitarist with The Police
- Andrew Surmani – music executive and professor
- Serj Tankian – musician, System of a Down
- Pinar Toprak – composer for film and television
- Carol Vaness – opera singer
- Diane Warren – musician, music publisher, winner of a Grammy Award, an Emmy Award, and a Golden Globe Award
- Tim Weisberg (1960s) – jazz/rock fusion flautist, composer, producer, vocalist
- Bill Worrell – musician

=== Radio ===
- Marc Cohen – radio personality
- Barry Smolin – KPFK radio DJ, musician, teacher

=== Science ===
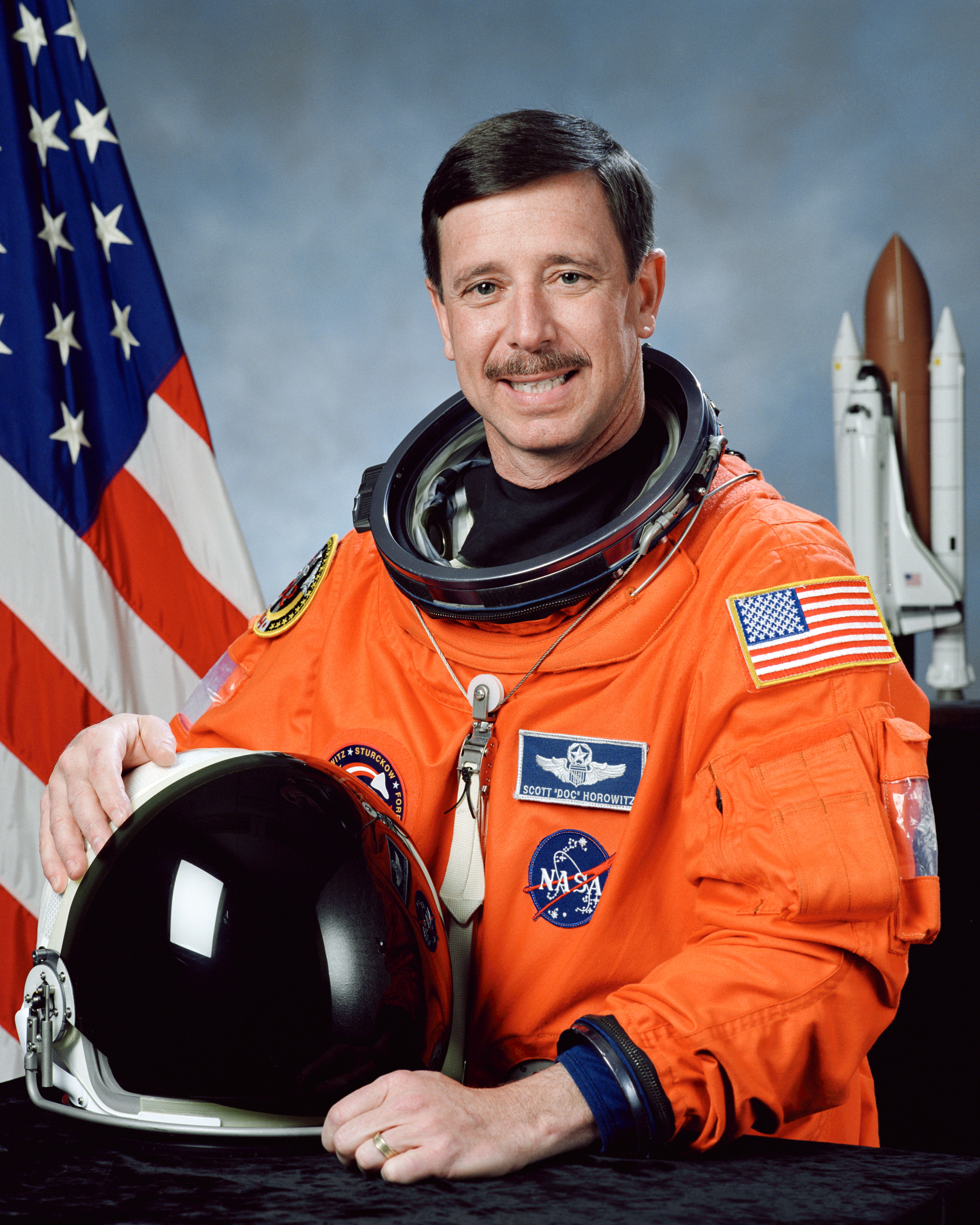
Scott Horowitz

- Jeannine Davis-Kimball (1929–2017) – archaeologist
- Luis Falcon – physician, computer scientist and human rights activist
- Scott Horowitz – Space Shuttle astronaut
- Olympia LePoint – author, professional public speaker and award-winning rocket scientist
- Adriana Ocampo – NASA scientist
- Simon Ourian – physician and businessman
- Ann E. Watkins – mathematician

=== Sports ===
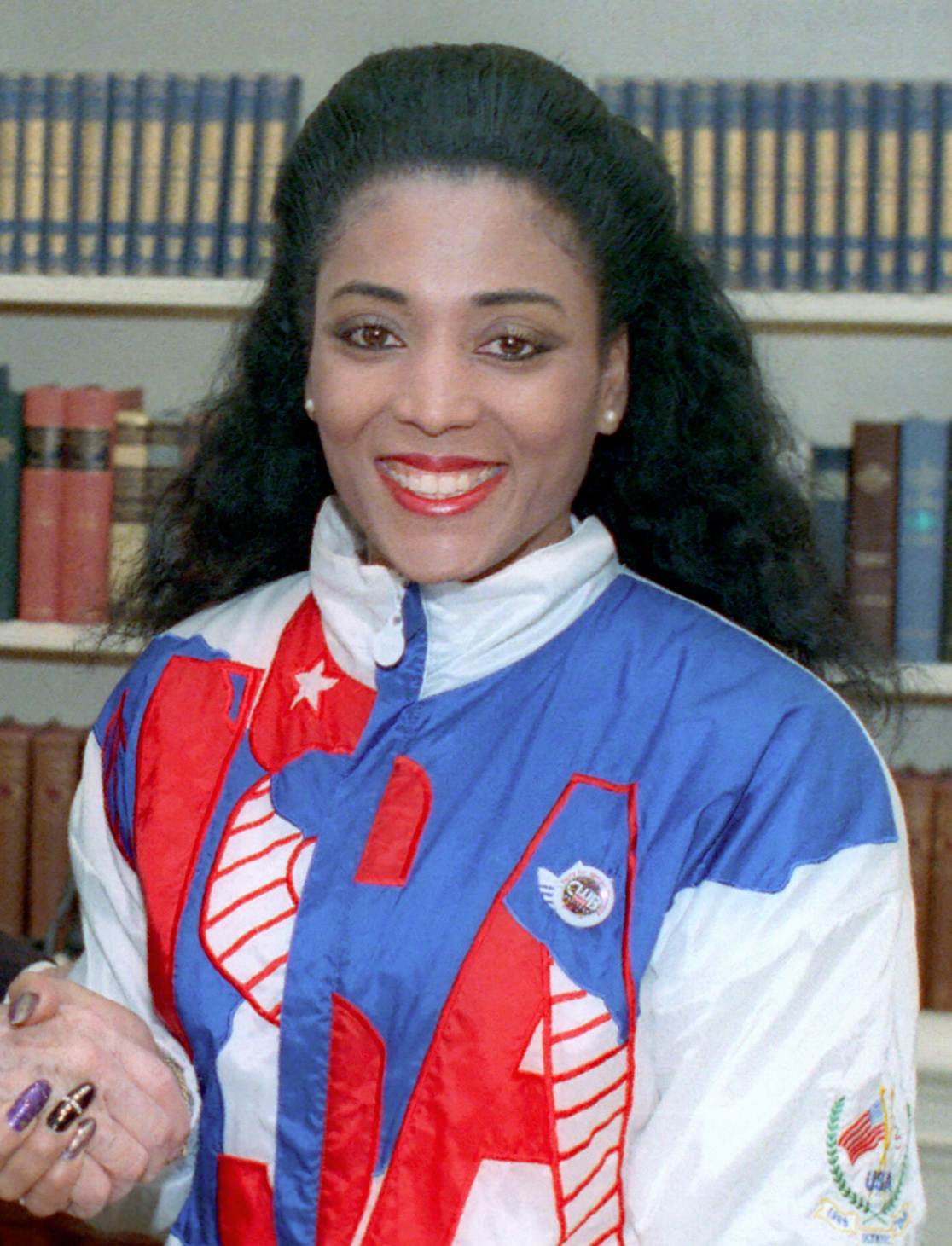
Florence Griffith Joyner

- Beth Allen – professional golfer
- Jodi Anderson – Olympic track and field athlete
- Judy Blumberg – three-time bronze medalist at the World Figure Skating Championships
- Jeanette Bolden – Olympic track and field athlete
- Sherdrick Bonner (1986) – quarterback for the Arizona Rattlers of the Arena Football League
- Lyman Bostock (1968) – star outfielder for the Minnesota Twins and California Angels
- Marcus Brady (1997) – quarterback for the Montreal Alouettes of the Canadian Football League
- Bobby Braswell (1985) – CSUN men's basketball head coach 1997–2013
- Katie Holloway Bridge – Paralympic volleyball player
- Valerie Brisco-Hooks – Olympic track and field champion
- Alice Brown – Olympic track and field athlete
- Julie Brown – Olympic track and field athlete
- Rex Caldwell – professional golfer
- Markus Carr – professional basketball player
- Denzel Clarke – professional baseball player
- Lamine Diane – basketball player
- Samantha Dirks – Olympic track and field athlete
- Paul Edmondson – pitcher for the Chicago White Sox
- Michael Efevberha – Nigerian-American professional basketball player
- Robert Fick – catcher and first baseman for the Washington Nationals
- Sean Franklin – professional soccer player; defender for Los Angeles Galaxy
- Florence Griffith Joyner – Olympic track and field champion
- D.J. Hackett – wide receiver for the Carolina Panthers
- Jacqueline Hansen – long distance runner and champion marathoner
- Hafsatu Kamara – Olympic track and field athlete
- Adam Kennedy – second baseman for the Los Angeles Dodgers
- Bob Kersee – track coach
- Joey Kirk – professional soccer player
- Kathy Kohner-Zuckerman – surfer
- Thor Lee – professional soccer player
- Bruce Lemmerman – professional football player
- Kameron Loe (1999) – pitcher for the Milwaukee Brewers
- Austin Matelson – professional wrestler, currently performing for All Elite Wrestling under the ring name Luchasaurus
- Paul McCracken – NBA and Maccabi Tel Aviv basketball player
- Lynda Morales – Olympic volleyball player
- Sandra Myers – Olympic track and field athlete
- Daniel Paladini – professional soccer player
- Mary Perry – Olympic volleyball player and coach
- James Richards – offensive guard for the Las Vegas Posse of the Canadian Football League
- Kenny Rosenberg (born 1995) – baseball pitcher for the Los Angeles Angels
- Joe Ryan – professional baseball pitcher and Olympic medalist
- Bob Samuelson – Olympic and professional volleyball player
- Willie Sims – professional soccer player; former forward for New England Revolution
- Pam Spencer – Olympic track and field athlete
- Mia St. John – professional boxer
- Dave Stephens – Olympic track and field athlete
- Michael Takahashi – 7-time All-Star player in the Japan Basketball League
- Jason Thompson – first baseman for the Detroit Tigers, California Angels, Pittsburgh Pirates and Montreal Expos
- Bryan Wagner – NFL football punter
- Kathy Weston – Olympic track and field athlete
- Jamie Whitmore – triathlete and para-cyclist
- Vic Wilk – professional golfer
- Isaac Yacob – NBA assistant coach

=== Visual arts ===
- Betty Beaumont – conceptual installation artist, sculptor, and photographer
- Karl Dempwolf – contemporary painter
- John Divola – artist
- Greg Evans – cartoonist, artist
- Scott Grieger – artist and academic
- Mike Mandel – conceptual artist and photographer, attended San Fernando Valley State College
- Michael C. McMillen – sculptor and installation artist
- Judith Simonian – contemporary painter, public and installation artist
- John Sonsini – artist

=== Crime ===
- Stephen Paddock (1977) – perpetrator of the 2017 Las Vegas shooting that killed 60 and injured over 500

== Baseball coaches ==
- Mike Batesole
- Stan Charnofsky
- Eddie Cornejo
- Matt Curtis
- Bob Hiegert
- Bill Kernen
- Greg Moore
- Dave Serrano

== Basketball coaches ==
- Bobby Braswell
- Pete Cassidy
- Mark Gottfried
- Jim Harrick
- Trent Johnson
- Andy Newman
- Reggie Theus

== Football coaches ==
- Dave Baldwin
- Jack Elway
- Rod Humenuik
- Tom Keele
- Leon McLaughlin
- Sam Winningham

== Softball coaches ==
- Tairia Flowers
- Charlotte Morgan

== Faculty ==
- Beatriz Cortez – artist and professor of Central American Studies
- Harry Gamboa Jr. – photographer and performance artist
- Bob McChesney – jazz trombonist and professor of music
- Aglaia Mortcheva – animator, voice actress, and professor of art
- Martin Pousson – novelist, poet, and professor of English
- Donna Sheng – professor of physics
- Steven Thachuk – classical guitarist and professor of music
- Jeremy Yoder – professor of biology
- Maria Elena Zavala – professor of biology

=== Retired and former faculty ===
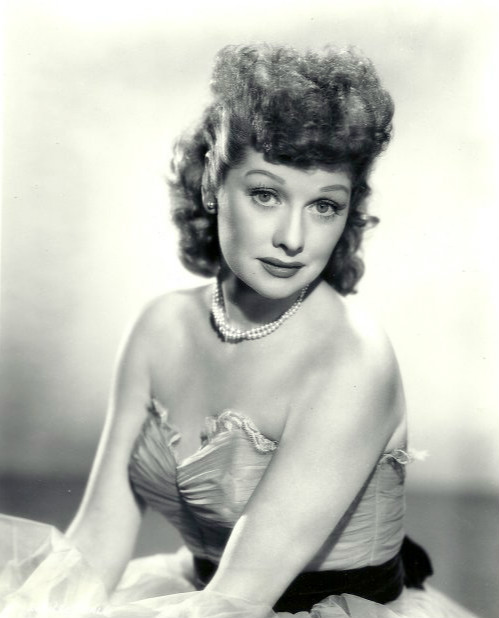
Lucille Ball

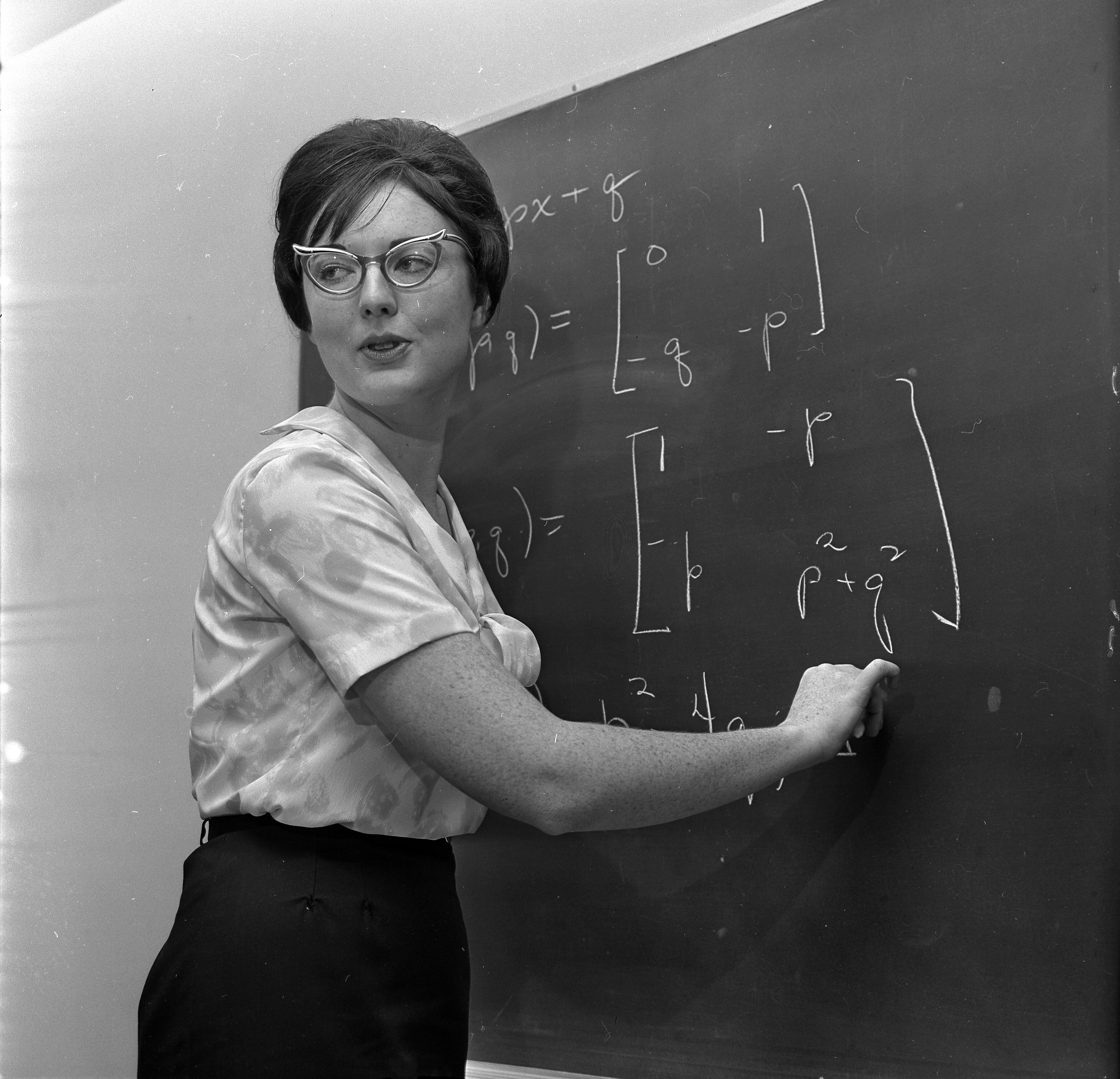
Lorraine Foster

- Kim Victoria Abeles – Guggenheim Fellow and professor in drawing, public art, and sculpturing
- Rodolfo Acuna – Chicano studies scholar
- Anthony Arthur – author and educator
- Lucille Ball – actress and comedian known for I Love Lucy, assistant professor in 1979
- Irving Block – artist
- Vern Bullough – historian and sexologist
- Hans Burkhardt – Swiss-American artist
- Edmund Snow Carpenter – associate professor of Anthropology
- Yreina Cervantez – professor of Chicano studies
- Annette Charles – actress and speech professor
- Stan Charnofsky – professor of educational psychology and counseling
- Barbara J. Collins – ecologist
- Lorence G. Collins – geologist
- Todd Compton – historian
- John Daversa – Grammy Award-winning jazz musician and professor
- Aurelio de la Vega – composer-in-residence, educator, distinguished professor emeritus, poet
- James Dickey – visiting lecturer, poet and novelist appointed as the 18th United States Poet Laureate and awarded with a Guggenheim Fellowship and National Book Award for Poetry
- Robert Docter – professor of education and LAUSD board member
- Fritz Faiss – German-American artist
- Lorraine Foster – mathematician, first woman to receive a Ph.D. in mathematics from California Institute of Technology
- Adele Eskeles Gottfried – professor of educational psychology and director of Research Enhancement of the Michael D. Eisner College of Education
- John Curtis Gowan – professor of psychology
- Beverly Grigsby – musicologist and composer
- Sheldon H. Harris – historian
- Bess Lomax Hawes – associate professor of anthropology and head of the Anthropology Department
- Harold Hellenbrand – administrator and scholar
- George Heussenstamm – composer
- Amir Hussain – associate professor of religious studies
- William Karush – mathematician
- Fred Katz – jazz cellist and composer, and anthropology professor
- William M. Kramer – rabbi and professor of religious studies
- Alexis Krasilovsky – filmmaker and professor of cinema
- Art Kunkin – journalist and founder of the Los Angeles Free Press
- James Lawson – visiting scholar in civil discourse and social change
- Dorothy D. Lee – professor of anthropology
- Joe Lewis – chair of the Department of Art
- Magnhild Lien – mathematician
- Prakash Chandra Lohani – professor of finance and Minister of Finance, Minister of Foreign Affairs, Minister of Agricultural and Livestock Development, and Minister of Labour & Transportation in Nepal
- Robert Oscar Lopez – professor of humanities
- Gloria Ricci Lothrop – historian
- Sabina Magliocco – Guggenheim and Fulbright Fellow, professor of anthropology and religion
- Elena Marchisotto – mathematician
- Khaled Mattawa – poet
- Leemon McHenry – bioethicist
- Beatrice Medicine – anthropologist
- Mohammed Morsi – engineer and 5th President of Egypt
- Raoul Naroll – professor of anthropology
- Julian Nava – diplomat and educator
- Roy Peel – director of the U.S. Census Bureau
- Peter Plagens – artist and art critic
- Ron Purcell – professor of music
- Mohammad Qayoumi – professor of Engineering Management, Minister of Finance, chief adviser on Infrastructure and Technology to the president of Afghanistan
- Daniel Raymer – aerospace design engineer
- Carol Rosenberger – classical pianist
- Velva E. Rudd – research fellow in the department of biology
- Raul Ruiz – journalist, activist, and professor of Chicano studies
- Benjamin Saltman – poet and professor of Literature
- Barry Sautman – adjunct assistant professor
- Saba Soomekh – professor of religious studies
- Ann Stanford – poet and professor of creative writing
- Harry Stone – professor of English and Charles Dickens scholar
- Nayereh Tohidi – professor and former chair of the Department of Gender & Women Studies
- Ann E. Watkins – professor of mathematics
- Gerald Wilson – jazz composer and educator
- Lewis Yablonsky – sociologist, criminologist, and psychotherapist

== Presidents ==
The following persons served as president of California State University, Northridge:

No.	Image	Name	Term start	Term end	Refs.
1		Ralph Prator	1958	1968	
2		James W. Cleary	1969	1992	
3		Blenda Wilson	September 1, 1992	June 30, 1999	
Interim		Louanne Kennedy	July 1, 1999	June 30, 2000	
4		Jolene Koester	July 1, 2000	December 31, 2011	
Interim		Harry Hellenbrand	January 1, 2012	June 2012	
5		Dianne F. Harrison	June 2012	January 10, 2021	
6		Erika D. Beck	January 11, 2021	present	
