= Ferejohn =

Ferejohn is a surname. Notable people with this surname include:

- John Ferejohn (born 1944), American legal scholar and political scientist
- Michael Ferejohn (born 1945), American philosopher
