= Utgoff =

Utgoff is a surname. Notable people with the surname include:

- Alec Utgoff (born 1986), Soviet-born English actor
- Kathleen Utgoff, American economist
