= List of Major League Baseball career games played as a second baseman leaders =

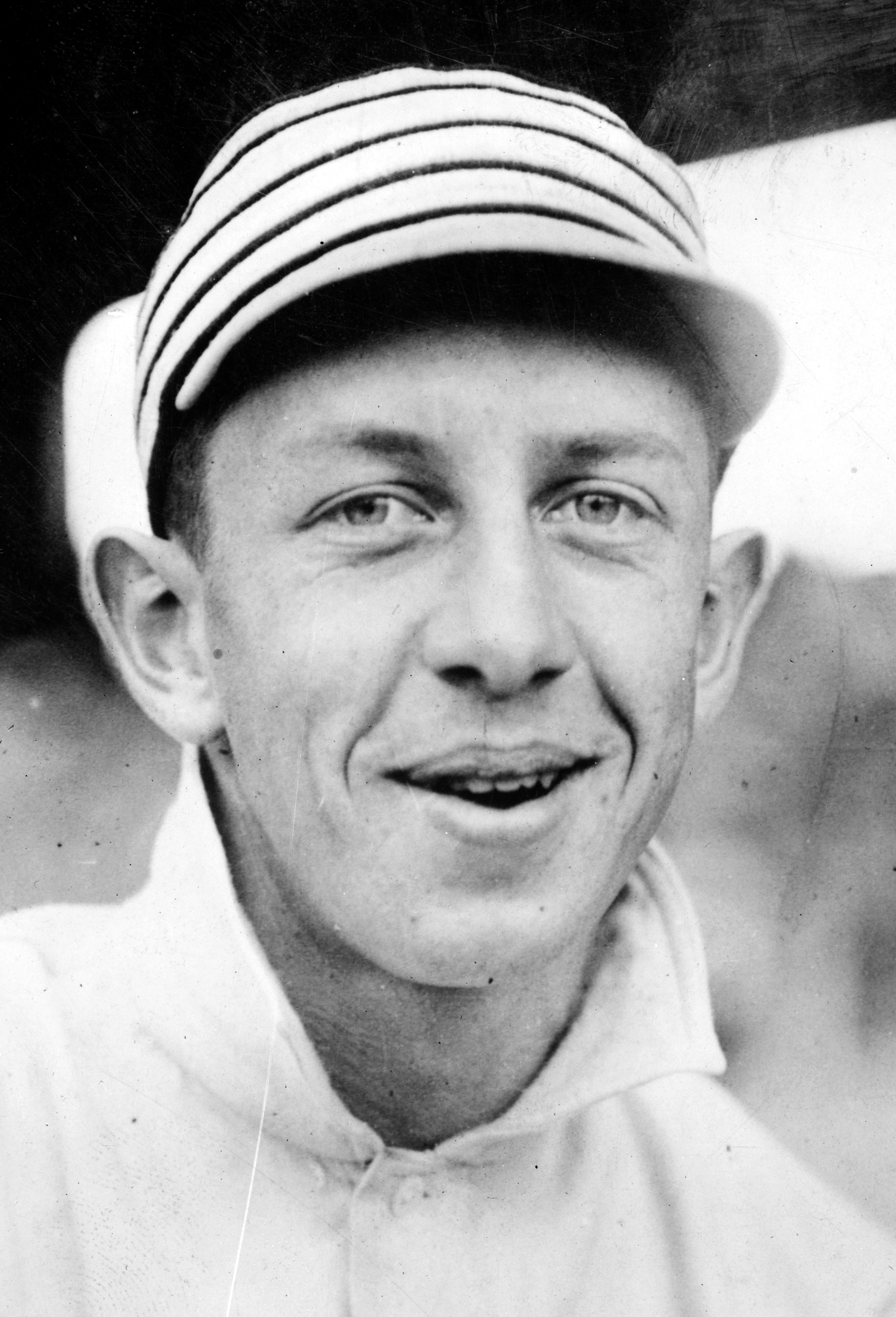
Eddie Collins, the all-time leader in games played as a second baseman.

Games played (most often abbreviated as G or GP) is a statistic used in team sports to indicate the total number of games in which a player has participated (in any capacity); the statistic is generally applied irrespective of whatever portion of the game is contested. In baseball, the statistic applies also to players who, prior to a game, are included on a starting lineup card or are announced as ex ante substitutes, whether or not they play; however, in Major League Baseball, the application of this statistic does not extend to consecutive games played streaks. A starting pitcher, then, may be credited with a game played even if he is not credited with a game started or an inning pitched. In baseball and softball, the second baseman is a fielding position in the infield, commonly stationed between second and first base. The second baseman often possesses quick hands and feet, needs the ability to get rid of the ball quickly, and must be able to make the pivot on a double play. In addition, second basemen are almost always right-handed. Only four left-handed throwing players have appeared as second basemen in the major leagues since 1950; one of the four, Gonzalo Márquez, was listed as the second baseman in the starting lineup for two games in 1973, batting in the first inning, but was replaced before his team took the field on defense, and none of the other three players lasted even a complete inning at the position. In the numbering system used to record defensive plays, the second baseman is assigned the number 4.

The second baseman is frequently the smallest player on the team, and the ability of such smaller players to absorb the impact of play has contributed to many long careers at the position throughout major league history; three-quarters of the second basemen elected to the Baseball Hall of Fame have been under 6' tall. Eddie Collins, the first major league player to appear in 2,500 games at a single position, is the all-time leader with 2,650 career games as a second baseman. Joe Morgan (2,527), Roberto Alomar (2,320), Lou Whitaker (2,308), Nellie Fox (2,295), Charlie Gehringer (2,206), Robinson Canó (2,165), Willie Randolph (2,152), Frank White (2,151), Bid McPhee (2,129), Bill Mazeroski (2,094), Nap Lajoie (2,035), and Jeff Kent (2,034) are the only other second baseman to play over 2,000 games at the position.

== Key ==
**Rank**	Rank amongst leaders in career games played. A blank field indicates a tie.
**Player (2026 Gs)**	Number of games played during the 2026 Major League Baseball season
**MLB**	Total career games played as a second baseman in Major League Baseball
*	Denotes elected to National Baseball Hall of Fame
**Bold**	Denotes active player (Note: A player is considered inactive if he has announced his retirement or not played for a full season.)

== List ==
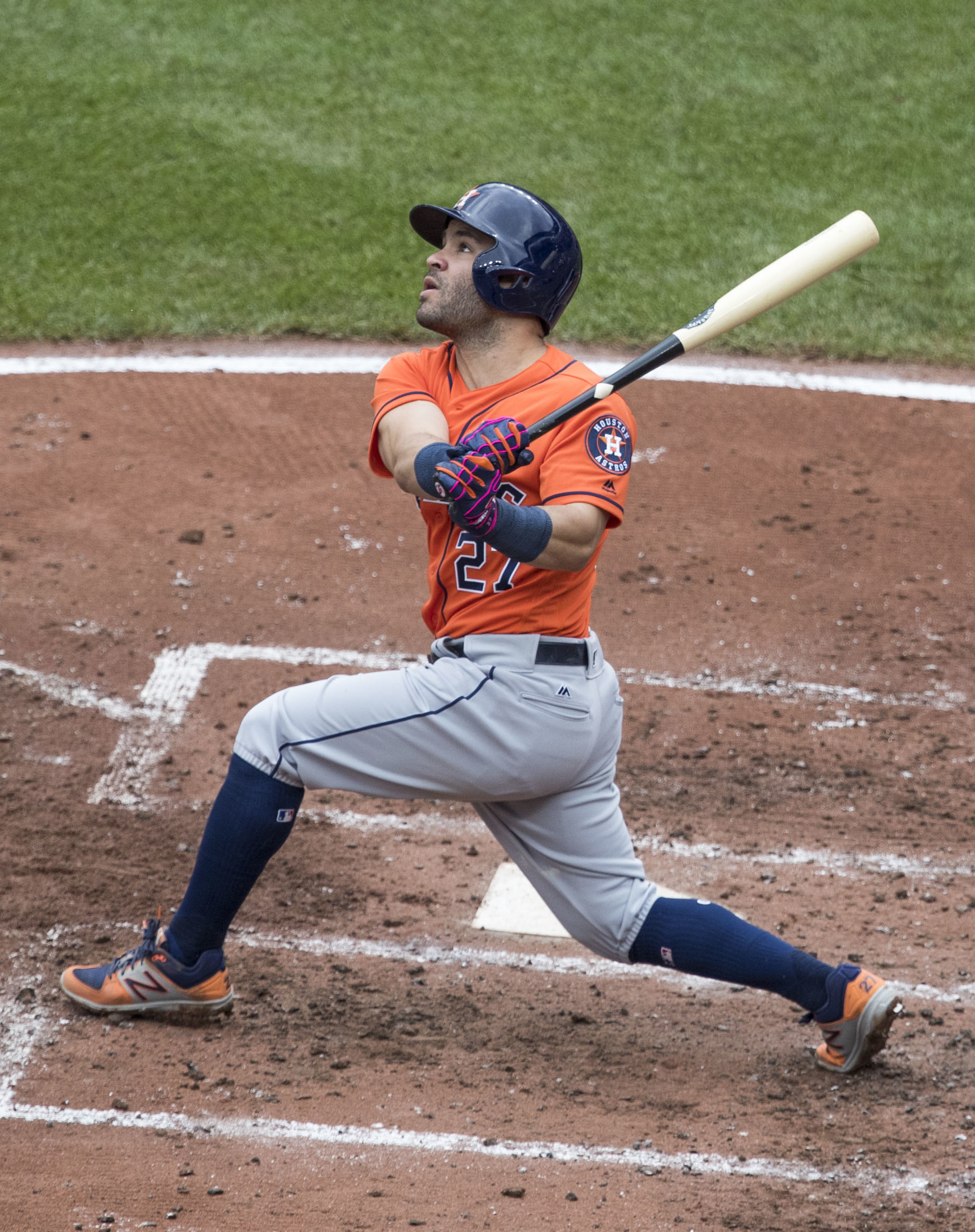
Jose Altuve, the active leader and 16th all-time in games played as a second baseman.

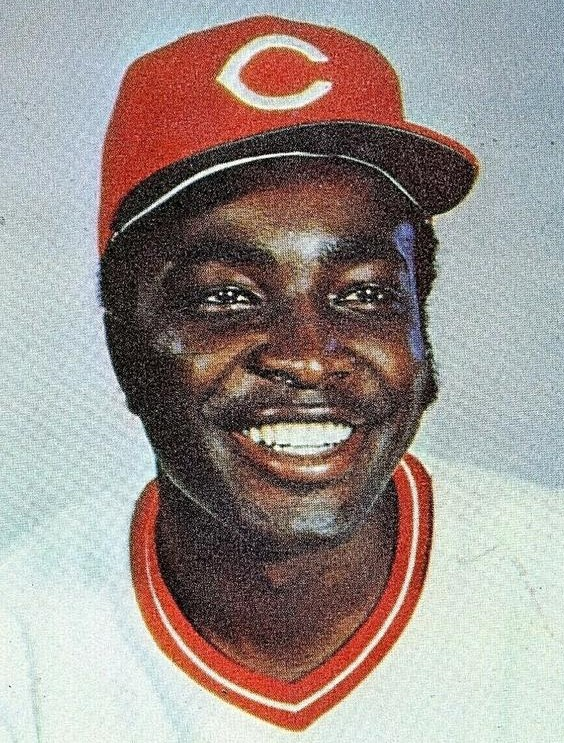
Joe Morgan holds the National League record.

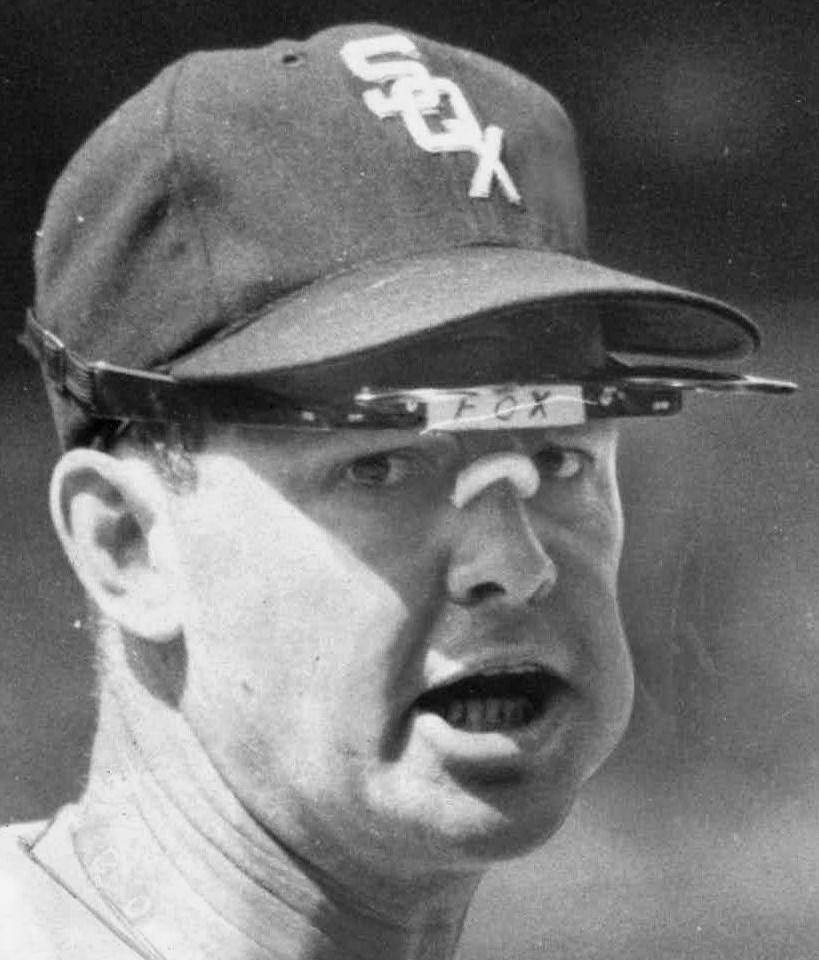
Nellie Fox led the American League in games at second base a record eight consecutive years.

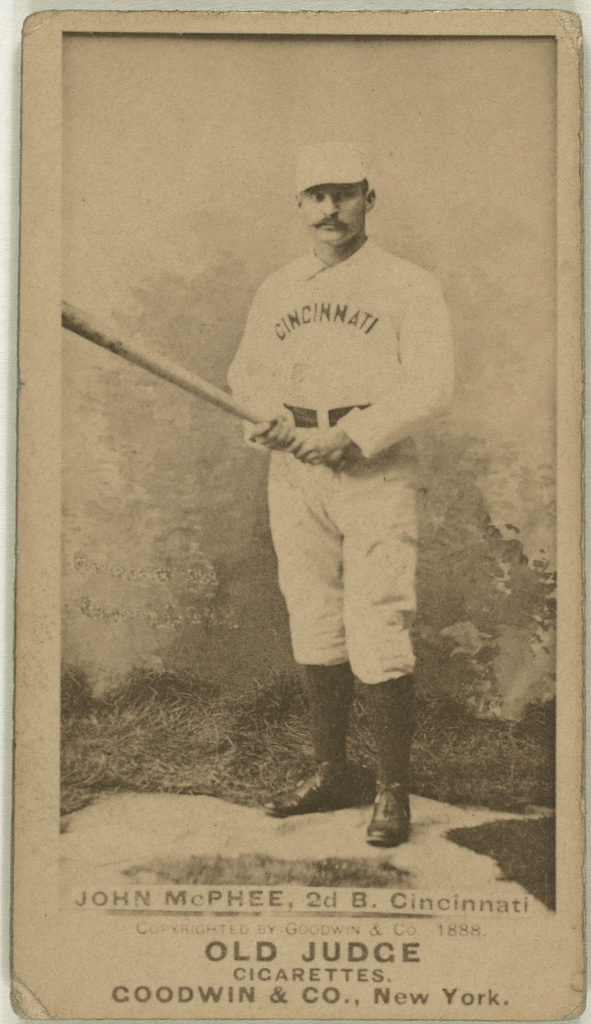
Bid McPhee held the major league record for 32 years.

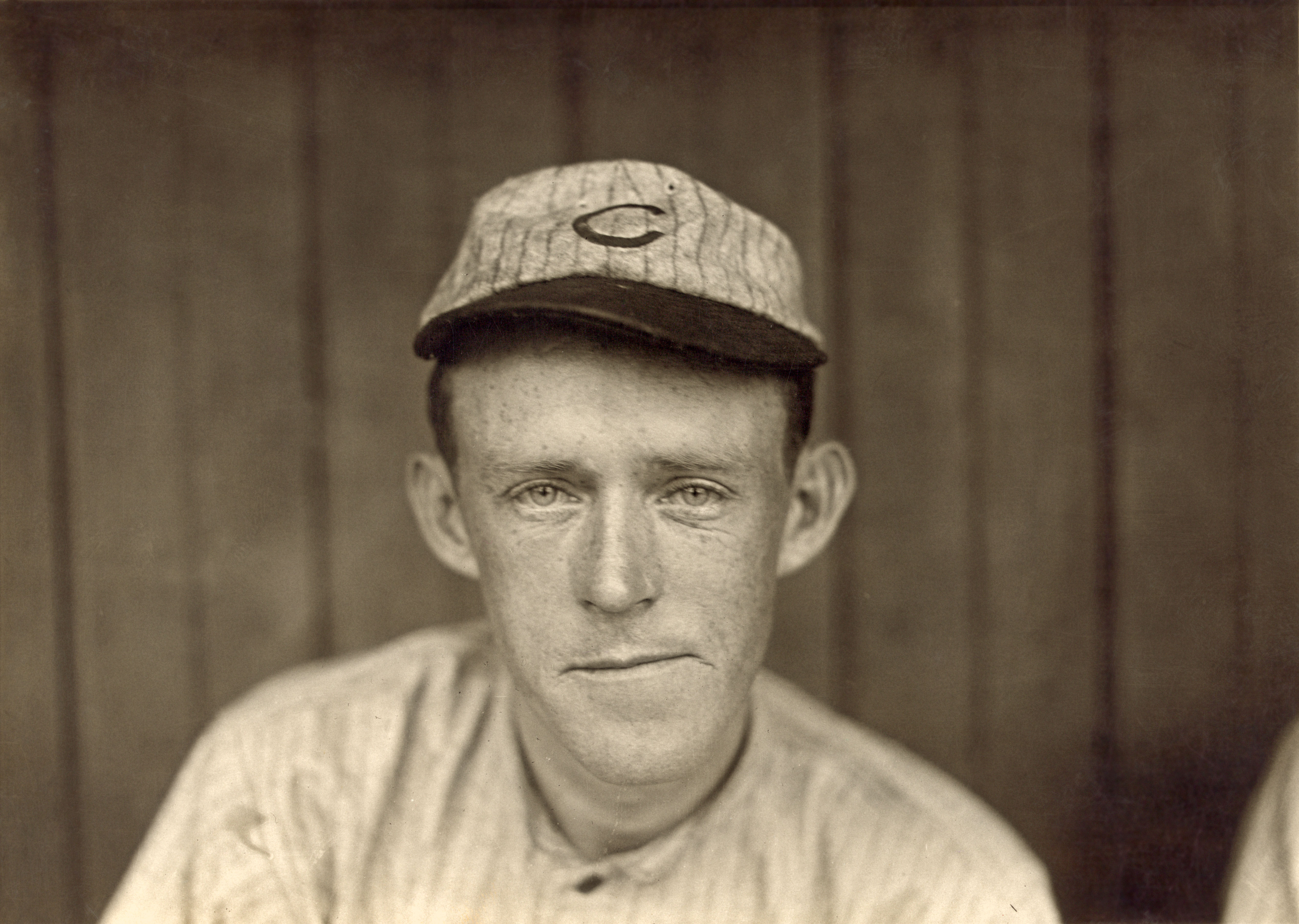
Johnny Evers held the National League record for 22 years.

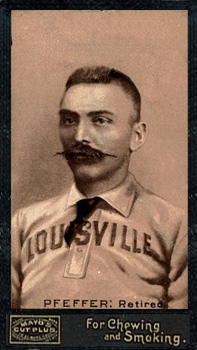
Fred Pfeffer held the National League record for 17 years.

- Stats updated as of September 27, 2026.

Rank	Player (2026 Gs)	Games as second baseman			Other leagues, notes
Rank	Player (2026 Gs)	MLB	American League	National League	Other leagues, notes
1	Eddie Collins*	2,650	2,650	0	
2	Joe Morgan*	2,527	100	2,427	
3	Roberto Alomar*	2,320	1,636	684	
4	Lou Whitaker	2,308	2,308	0	
5	Nellie Fox*	2,295	2,179	116	
6	Charlie Gehringer*	2,206	2,206	0	
7	Robinson Canó	2,178	2,025	153	
8	Willie Randolph	2,152	1,893	259	
9	Frank White	2,151	2,151	0	
10	Bid McPhee*	2,129	0	1,218	Includes 911 in American Association; held major league record, 1891-1923
11	Bill Mazeroski*	2,094	0	2,094	Held National League record, 1968-1980
12	Nap Lajoie*	2,035	1,720	315	Held American League record, 1911-1920
13	Jeff Kent*	2,034	26	2,008	
14	Ryne Sandberg*	1,995	0	1,995	
15	Craig Biggio*	1,989	0	1,989	
16	**Jose Altuve (129)**	1,960	1,613	347	
17	Bobby Doerr*	1,852	1,852	0	
18	Ray Durham	1,843	1,135	708	
19	Red Schoendienst*	1,834	0	1,834	Held National League record, 1961-1968
	Brandon Phillips	1,831	157	1,674	
21	Ian Kinsler	1,828	1,756	72	
22	Billy Herman*	1,813	0	1,813	Held National League record, 1946-1962
23	Bobby Grich	1,765	1,765	0	
24	Bret Boone	1,763	809	954	
25	Frankie Frisch*	1,762	0	1,762	Held National League record, 1936-1946
26	Chase Utley	1,743	0	1,743	
27	Johnny Evers*	1,735	1	1,734	Held National League record, 1914-1936
28	Larry Doyle	1,728	0	1,728	
29	Del Pratt	1,688	1,688	0	
30	Luis Castillo	1,683	227	1,456	
31	Steve Sax	1,679	609	1,070	
32	Kid Gleason	1,585	254	1,331	
33	Rogers Hornsby*	1,561	19	1,542	
34	Julián Javier	1,552	0	1,552	
35	Fred Pfeffer	1,538	0	1,414	Includes 124 in Players' League; held National League record, 1891-1908
36	Miller Huggins*	1,530	0	1,530	
37	Joe Gordon*	1,519	1,519	0	
38	Frank Bolling	1,518	779	739	
	Manny Trillo	1,518	124	1,394	
40	Tony Taylor	1,498	190	1,308	
41	Dustin Pedroia	1,492	1,492	0	
42	George Cutshaw	1,486	175	1,311	
43	Claude Ritchey	1,479	0	1,479	Held National League record, 1908-1914
44	Tony Lazzeri*	1,456	1,441	15	
45	Cupid Childs	1,455	0	1,330	Includes 125 in American Association
46	Hughie Critz	1,453	0	1,453	
47	Félix Millán	1,450	0	1,450	
48	Jim Gantner	1,449	1,449	0	
49	Cookie Rojas	1,446	789	657	
50	Davey Lopes	1,418	265	1,153	
51	Tom Herr	1,416	73	1,343	
52	Delino DeShields	1,392	189	1,203	
53	Chuck Knoblauch	1,381	1,381	0	
54	Lou Bierbauer	1,366	0	723	Includes 510 in American Association, 133 in Players' League
55	Mark Ellis	1,364	1,021	343	
56	Bill Doran	1,359	17	1,342	
57	Adam Kennedy	1,347	1,053	294	
58	Buddy Myer	1,340	1,340	0	
59	Harold Reynolds	1,339	1,339	0	
	Bobby Richardson	1,339	1,339	0	
61	Glenn Hubbard	1,332	152	1,180	
62	Dave Cash	1,330	0	1,330	
63	Bobby Lowe	1,316	163	1,153	
	Ski Melillo	1,316	1,316	0	
65	Johnny Temple	1,312	277	1,035	
66	Don Blasingame	1,310	371	939	
67	Joe Quinn	1,307	66	1,108	Includes 133 in Players' League
68	Brian Roberts	1,304	1,304	0	
69	Eric Young	1,295	21	1,274	
70	Ted Sizemore	1,288	34	1,254	
71	Dan Uggla	1,283	0	1,283	
72	Orlando Hudson	1,279	588	691	
	Robby Thompson	1,279	0	1,279	
74	Johnny Ray	1,277	363	914	
75	Tito Fuentes	1,275	164	1,111	
76	Ron Hunt	1,260	0	1,260	
77	Bucky Harris*	1,253	1,253	0	
78	Mickey Morandini	1,245	35	1,210	
79	Glenn Beckert	1,242	0	1,242	
80	Otto Knabe	1,239	0	1,001	Includes 238 in Federal League
81	Max Bishop	1,230	1,230	0	
82	Aaron Hill	1,210	750	460	
83	Tony Cuccinello	1,205	6	1,199	
	Bill Wambsganss	1,205	1,205	0	
85	Davey Johnson	1,198	947	251	
86	Mark McLemore	1,197	1,178	19	
87	Ronnie Belliard	1,190	383	807	
	Juan Samuel	1,190	30	1,160	
89	Howie Kendrick	1,183	967	216	
90	**DJ LeMahieu (0)**	1,182	290	892	
91	Jerry Priddy	1,179	1,179	0	
92	Jimmy Williams	1,176	1,176	0	Held American League record, 1908-1911
93	Damion Easley	1,172	989	183	
94	Ron Oester	1,171	0	1,171	
95	Bobby Ávila	1,168	1,117	51	
95	Jim Gilliam	1,166	0	1,046	Includes 120 in Negro National League (second) (incomplete)
97	Dick Green	1,158	1,158	0	
98	Sandy Alomar	1,156	1,114	42	
99	Eddie Stanky	1,152	0	1,152	
100	Cub Stricker	1,145	0	276	Includes 760 in American Association, 109 in Players' League

== Other Hall of Famers ==
Player	Games as second baseman			Other leagues, notes
Player	MLB	American League	National League	Other leagues, notes
Rod Carew*	1,130	1,130	0	
Jackie Robinson*	748	0	748	
Rabbit Maranville*	513	0	513	
John Montgomery Ward*	493	0	493	
Paul Molitor*	400	400	0	
John Henry Lloyd*	223	0	0	Includes 223 in Eastern Colored League (incomplete)
George Kelly*	145	0	145	
Ed Delahanty*	131	0	111	Includes 20 in Players' League
George Davis*	113	98	15	
Roger Connor*	68	0	68	
Ray Dandridge*	54	0	0	Includes 54 in Negro National League (second) (incomplete)
Martín Dihigo*	45	0	0	Includes 28 in Eastern Colored League, 12 in American Negro League, 5 in Negro National League (second) (incomplete)
Joe Cronin*	35	1	34	
Dick Allen*	4	3	1	
Adrián Beltré*	1	1	0	
Dave Parker*	1	0	1	
Frank Grant*	0	0	0	Unavailable pre-Negro league figures
