= Dell K. Allen =

American engineer (born 1931)

- Born: 1931 (age 94–95)
- Education: Utah State University
- Occupation: Engineer
- Known for: Classification and coding systems

Dell K. Allen (born 1931) is an American engineer, and Professor Emeritus of manufacturing engineering at Brigham Young University (BYU). The Society of Manufacturing Engineers named their Outstanding Young Manufacturing Engineer Award after him.

== Early life and education ==
Allen received his B.S. in 1954 from the Utah State University and his M.S. in 1966 from Brigham Young University. He earned a Ed.D. degree from Utah State University in 1973. His later work was more focused on information storage and information retrieval while his early work had been focused on metallurgy and manufacturing technology. After retiring as a professor at BYU, Allen taught at Utah State University.

Allen was elected as a member into the National Academy of Engineering in 1984 for innovative classification and coding systems used in computer-aided manufacturing and persevering efforts to improve curricula for industrial and manufacturing engineers.

== Publications ==
Books, a selection:

- 1969. Metallurgy Theory and Practice. Chicago, American Technical Society
- 1994. Fundamental principles of manufacturing processes. With Robert H. Todd and Leo Alting.
- 1994. Manufacturing Processes Reference Guide with Robert H. Todd
