= Bob Hiegert =

American baseball coach and university administrator (1941–2025)

Robert Hiegert
- Born: February 17, 1942
- Died: June 19, 2025 (aged 83)
- Education: California State University, Northridge
- Occupation: Baseball coach · Athletic director
- Employer(s): California State University, Northridge
- Awards: 2× NCAA Division II National Champion (1970, 1984); National Coach of the Year (1984); CSUN Athletics Hall of Fame (1998)

Robert J. Hiegert (February 17, 1942 – June 19, 2025) was an American college baseball coach and athletics administrator. He was head baseball coach at California State University, Northridge (CSUN) from 1967 to 1984 and is the program's longest-tenured and winningest coach. During his tenure, he led the Matadors to two NCAA Division II national championships and later became CSUN's athletic director as well as commissioner of the California Collegiate Athletic Association (CCAA).

== Early life and education ==
Hiegert graduated from Notre Dame High School in Sherman Oaks, California, before enrolling at San Fernando Valley State College (now CSUN) in 1960. While a student, he was active in campus life, joining the Delta Sigma Nu fraternity and serving on the freshman steering committee and as sophomore class president.

Hiegert was a four-year starting shortstop for the Matadors from 1960 to 1963, playing under head coaches Phil Munroe and Stan Charnofsky. He was part of the program's first winning season in 1960 and was named Athlete of the Year during his collegiate career. He earned a bachelor's degree in 1964 and a master's degree in 1968.

== Playing career ==
After college, Hiegert played professional baseball in the Los Angeles Angels organization before returning to CSUN in a coaching capacity.

== Coaching career ==
Hiegert became head baseball coach at CSUN in 1967 and led the team to three consecutive winning seasons at the start of his tenure. In 1970, the Matadors recorded 41 wins, won the California Collegiate Athletic Association title, and captured the NCAA Division II National Championship.

During Hiegert's tenure, CSUN earned 11 NCAA Tournament berths, eight conference championships, five regional titles, and 14 winning seasons. The Matadors made eight appearances at the College World Series during his time as head coach and finished in the top three nationally five times, including a runner-up finish in 1972.

In his final season as head coach in 1984, CSUN won a then-record 46 games, averaged 8.1 runs per game, and went 8–2 in postseason play to claim its second NCAA Division II national championship. Following that season, Hiegert was named National Coach of the Year.

Over his coaching career, 20 CSUN players received All-American honors, 57 received All-District honors, and 107 received All-Conference honors. Twenty-three of his players were selected in the MLB First-Year Player Draft, with five reaching the Major League level.

== Administrative career ==
Hiegert became CSUN's men's athletic director beginning in 1984 and continued in administrative roles after retiring from coaching. From 1988 to 1995, he was director of athletics for both men's and women's programs. In 1990 he helped CSUN move from NCAA Division II to Division I. In 1997, he was appointed commissioner of the California Collegiate Athletic Association, a position he held until his retirement in 2013.

== Controversy ==
In 1992, Hiegert faced public criticism and calls for his resignation as athletic director at CSUN amid allegations of racial insensitivity and inequities within the athletics program. Black student organizations, including the Black Student Union and the Black Athletes Association, accused the department of fostering a hostile climate for Black students and pointed to disparities in graduation rates between Black athletes and the broader student-athlete population. Hiegert denied the accusations, characterizing them as “false” and “unsubstantiated,” and asserted that the criticism was part of a coordinated campaign. He stated publicly that he would not resign and indicated he was considering legal action in response to what he described as defamatory claims. Hiegert acknowledged concerns about graduation rates and said the department was working to improve them.

Later that year, an independent university-commissioned report examined the allegations and concluded that the CSUN athletic program had not engaged in racial discrimination. The report found no evidence of racial bias in departmental policies or practices, though it noted concerns about overall graduation rates among student-athletes and recommended improvements in academic support. University officials said the report found no evidence of racial bias in the athletics department but that efforts to improve student graduation rates would continue. Hiegert remained athletic director after the report was released.

== Honors ==
Hiegert was inducted into the CSUN Athletics Hall of Fame in 1998 and later into the CCAA Hall of Fame and the American Baseball Coaches Association Hall of Fame. In January 2025, CSUN renamed its home baseball facility Robert J. Hiegert Field in his honor.

== Personal life and death ==
Hiegert married his wife, Jackie, whom he met while both were students at Valley State. He died on June 19, 2025, at the age of 83.
