= Cal State Northridge Matadors baseball =

American intercollegiate baseball team

Cal State Northridge Matadors
- 2026 Cal State Northridge Matadors baseball team
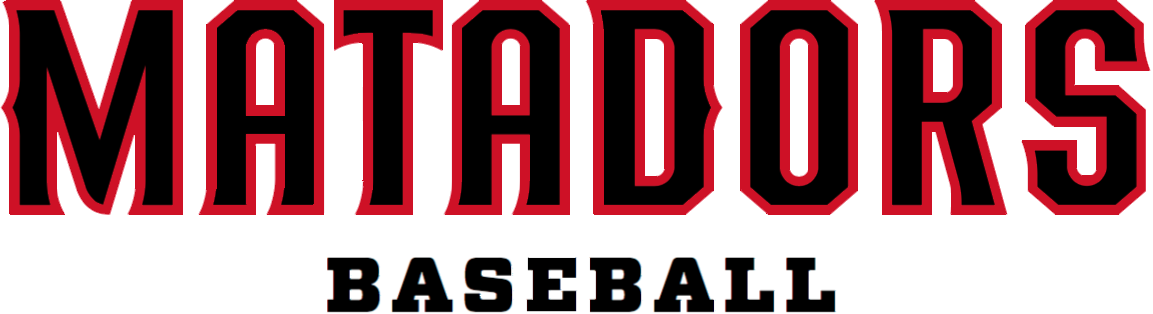
- Founded: 1959
- University: California State University, Northridge
- Head coach: Eddie Cornejo (4th season)
- Conference: Big West
- Location: Northridge, California
- Home stadium: Matador Field (capacity: 1,200)
- Nickname: Matadors
- Colors: Red, white, and black

College World Series champions
- Division II: 1970, 1984

College World Series runner-up
- Division II: 1972, 1990

College World Series appearances
- Division II: 1970, 1972, 1975, 1981, 1984, 1990

NCAA tournament appearances
- Division II; 1970, 1971, 1972, 1973, 1975, 1976, 1977, 1980, 1981, 1982, 1984, 1987, 1990 Division I 1991, 1992, 1993, 1996, 2002

Conference regular season champions
- 1996, 2002

The Cal State Northridge Matadors baseball team represents California State University, Northridge in the sport of baseball. The team competes in NCAA Division I in the Big West Conference. They are currently led by head coach Eddie Cornejo, who coached his first season in 2023.

== History ==
The program was established in 1959, and competed at the Division II level until 1990. The Matadors were associate members of the Western Athletic Conference from 1993 through 1996 and joined the Big West in 2002 after five seasons as an independent.

While in Division II, Cal State Northridge claimed a pair of national championships (1970, 1974), two runner-ups (1972, 1990), and several other College World Series appearances. At the Division I level, the Matadors have appeared in five NCAA Tournaments.

== Cal State Northridge in the NCAA Tournament ==
Year	Record	Pct	Notes
1991	3–2	.600	West II Regional
1992	1–2	.333	Midwest Regional
1993	2–2	.500	West Regional
1996	3–2	.600	West Regional
2002	1–2	.333	Los Angeles Regional
TOTALS	10–10	.500	

== Notable players ==
- Lyman Bostock (1971–1972) – outfielder in Major League Baseball (MLB) (1975–1978)
- Jason Thompson (1973–1975) – first baseman in MLB (1976–1986), three-time All-Star
- Adam Kennedy (1995–1997) – 2002 ALCS MVP with the Anaheim Angels
- Robert Fick – first baseman, right fielder and catcher in MLB (1998–2007), 2002 All-Star
- Jeff McNeil – New York Mets (2013–present), 2022 NL batting champion and Silver Slugger, two-time All-Star
- Kenny Rosenberg – pitcher for the Los Angeles Angels (2022–2024)
- Denzel Clarke (2019–2021) – outfielder for the Athletics (2025–present)

Source: Baseball Reference

== See also ==
- List of NCAA Division I baseball programs
