= Adele Eskeles Gottfried =

Psychologist and educator

- Citizenship: American
- Occupation: Professor of Educational Psychology
- Spouse: Allen W. Gottfried

Academic background
- Education: Queens College, University of Chicago, The Graduate Center

Adele Eskeles Gottfried is a professor emerita and psychologist known for her work in the field of intrinsic motivation, giftedness, and academic achievement. Gottfried taught in the department of Educational Psychology at California State University, Northridge, where she was director of Research Enhancement of the Michael D. Eisner College of Education.

Gottfried is known for creating the Children’s Academic Intrinsic Motivation Inventory (CAIMI) and for co-directing the Fullerton Longitudinal Study with Allen W. Gottfried. Gottfried was awarded the Social Responsibility Award from the Western Psychological Association in 2011 "based on her research in the field of intrinsic motivation that has contributed to enhancing knowledge about children’s motivational development and educational attainment." Her co-authored article titled A longitudinal study of academic intrinsic motivation in intellectually gifted children: Childhood through adolescence was awarded the MENSA International Limited Award for Excellence in Research in 1997.

== Biography ==
Gottfried completed a B.A. in educational psychology and counseling from Queens College, City University of New York in 1967. She then completed a M.A. at the University of Chicago in 1968. Later Gottfried attended the Graduate School of the City University of New York where she obtained her Ph.D. in educational / developmental psychology in 1975. Gottfried is married to her research collaborator, Allen W. Gottfried, and has two children.

Gottfried is a Fellow of the American Psychological Association (Divisions 7, 9, and 15), the Association for Psychological Science, and the Western Psychological Association. She was an Inaugural Fellow of the American Educational Research Association. She has served on the editorial boards of various scientific journals, including Child Development.

== Research ==
Gottfried is the author of numerous publications pertaining to academic intrinsic motivation, relationships between the home environment, maternal and dual-earner employment status, and children's development, and giftedness. Her co-edited book, Academic motivation and the culture of the school in childhood and adolescence, draws connections between academic motivation and achievement, social relationships, and school culture. In one of her longitudinal studies, Gottfried and colleagues analyzed pathways between math intrinsic motivation and performance in math courses in youth of ages of 9 to 17 years. The study identified links between children's math achievement and motivation, with both declining over the high school years.

Gottfried is the co-author, with Allen W. Gottfried and others, of the volume Gifted IQ: Early Developmental Aspects - The Fullerton Longitudinal Study, which summarizes findings of the Fullerton Longitudinal Study that aimed to trace the development of giftedness before identification or labeling of children as gifted. Since 1970, the Fullerton Longitudinal Study has followed the development of over 100 individuals through measures of academic performance, personality traits, home and family environment, and giftedness. One of their co-authored papers on the Fullerton Longitudinal Study reported findings from twelve assessments of intellectual performance taken over a sixteen-year interval. The study aimed to establish the stability of intelligence over four developmental stages: infancy, preschool, childhood, and adolescence. Using latent variable modeling, the authors found a high degree of stability in intelligence from infancy through adolescence, even though there were weaker correlations between IQ scores when measures were taken at longer intervals. That is, the IQ scores at later time-points tended to be less correlated with scores at earlier time-points as the interval between assessment waves increased.

Adele and Allen Gottfried also co-edited the book Maternal Employment and Children’s Development published in 1988. This book addressed concerns about the growing numbers of women with young children who were entering the workforce. Their main finding was that the children of working mothers did not appear to suffer as a consequence of their mother's employment status.

== Representative publications ==
- Gottfried, A. E., Fleming, J. S., & Gottfried, A. W. (1994). Role of parental motivational practices in children's academic intrinsic motivation and achievement. Journal of Educational Psychology, 86(1), pages 104-113.
- Gottfried, A. E., Fleming, J. S., & Gottfried, A. W. (1998). Role of cognitively stimulating home environment in children's academic intrinsic motivation: A longitudinal study. Child Development, 69(5), pages 1448-1460.
- Gottfried, A. E., Fleming, J. S., & Gottfried, A. W. (2001). Continuity of academic intrinsic motivation from childhood through late adolescence: A longitudinal study. Journal of Educational Psychology, 93(1), pages 3–13.
- Gottfried, A. E., & Gottfried, A. W. (1996). A longitudinal study of academic intrinsic motivation in intellectually gifted children: Childhood through early adolescence. Gifted Child Quarterly, 40(4), pages 179-183.
- Gottfried, A. E., Marcoulides, G. A., Gottfried, A. W., Oliver, P. H., & Guerin, D. W. (2007). Multivariate latent change modeling of developmental decline in academic intrinsic math motivation and achievement: Childhood through adolescence. International Journal of Behavioral Development, 31(4), pages 317-327.
- Gottfried, A. E., Marcoulides, G. A., Gottfried, A. W., & Oliver, P. H. (2009). A latent curve model of parental motivational practices and developmental decline in math and science academic intrinsic motivation. Journal of Educational Psychology, 101(3), pages 729-739.
