= Intelligence Quotient (IQ) and Browser Usage =

Debunked study created by Canadian company AptiQuant

"Intelligence Quotient (IQ) and Browser Usage" was a hoax study allegedly released by a Canadian company called AptiQuant Psychometric Consulting Co. on July 26, 2011, that claimed to have correlated the IQs of 100,000 internet users with which web browsers they used. Its claims that users of Microsoft's Internet Explorer had lower IQs than users of other browsers was widely covered in the media, and its revelation as a hoax was widely cited as an example of the weaknesses of the media. The speed with which the story was reported was also alleged by some to be indicative of anti-Microsoft bias.

The hoax was arranged by Tarandeep Gill, a web developer from Vancouver, British Columbia. He claimed it was to raise awareness of the outdated nature of earlier versions of Internet Explorer that still have significant market share.

It came amid a wave of other negative coverage of earlier versions of Internet Explorer.

== Reported results ==
Browser	Average IQ, 2006	Average IQ, 2011
Internet Explorer 6	103	83
Internet Explorer 7	108	88
Internet Explorer 8	-	92
Internet Explorer 9	-	90
Firefox	104	108
Chrome	-	112
Safari	113	114
Internet Explorer with Google Chrome Frame	-	123
Camino	-	125
Opera	101	128

The study was presented as measuring how IQ affects choices to adopt new technologies.

== Conception ==
Gill says he got the idea for the hoax about a month prior to its release when working on his website. "IE6 compatibility was being a pain in the ass," he told ReadWriteWeb.

== Release ==
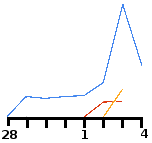
Google Search traffic for the terms aptiquant (blue), browser iq (red) and internet explorer iq (orange) between July 28 and August 4

The report was covered by many news outlets. Initially the discrepancy was explained by that the advanced computer users with high IQs were savvy enough to choose other browsers.

When the report was first covered by the BBC some readers were skeptical of its authenticity and quickly noted that the domain for the company had only been set up a month prior and that pictures of the company's staff were from the French company Central Test. Central Test began investigating the issue and said it was considering legal action against whoever had used the photos. It was initially suspected that the whole thing was a plot to spread malware; however, the PDF was examined and none was found. As the hoax was uncovered additional problems with the report were raised, the results were noted as improbable and the task of collecting 100,000 users very difficult. The address given on the website was looked up using Google Street View and it turned out to be just a parking lot.

While the story was being covered Gill posed as Leonard Howard, the fabricated owner of AptiQuant, to the media. He also wrote a blog on the AptiQuant website about how they were being sued by Internet Explorer users and that it had been receiving hate mail.

Some news outlets criticized the methodology of the study, although without realizing it was a hoax. It was even described as "junk science at its worst". Some defended the study; for example, The Register wrote, "The methodology of the study appears sound."

== Aftermath ==
The hoax coverage was said by some to be a victory for citizen journalism, as it was readers who first uncovered that it was a hoax. Wired wrote that "Too often, business analysts and statistics and insider rumors carry a similar currency in journalism. They often add just a thin sheen of detail and a slightly stronger claim to verification. Really, guys, it’s just a color PDF."

== List of news sources fooled by hoax ==
- Dino Grandoni, The Atlantic Wire (July 29)
- BBC News
- Business Standard (August 2)
- Ysolt Usigan, CBS News (August 1)
- Chris Matyszczyk, CNET (July 29)
- Doug Gross, CNN (July 29)
- Mark Huffman, ConsumerAffairs.com (August 1)
- CTV Television Network (July 30)
- Tim Worstall, Forbes (July 29)
- Adrian Chen, Gawker (August 1)
- Jason O. Gilbert, The Huffington Post (August 1)
- The Independent (July 30)
- Indian Express (July 31)
- Robert X. Cringely, InfoWorld (August 1)
- Lawrence Latif, The Inquirer (July 29)
- International Business Times (July 29)
- Kevin Fogarty, IT World (August 1)
- KGO-TV (July 29)
- Caroline Crouch, KNXV-TV (August 2)
- Mashable (July 29)
- Muy Interesante (August 2)
- Dan Amira, New York Magazine (July 29)
- Kevin Spak, Newser (July 29)
- Eyder Peralta, NPR (August 2)
- David Murphy, PC Magazine (July 30)
- Rik Myslewski, The Register (July 29)
- Matt Rosoff, San Francisco Chronicle (July 28)
- Nick Eaton, Seattle Post-Intelligencer (July 29)
- Jonathan Walczak, Seattle Weekly (July 29)
- The Daily Telegraph (August 1)
- Times of India (July 30)
- Douglas Perry, Tom's Hardware (August 2)
- Sarah Deen, Metro (August 1)
