= Eddie Cornejo =

American baseball coach

Current position
- Title: Head coach
- Team: Cal State Northridge
- Conference: Big West
- Record: 104–103

Biographical details
- Born: November 19, 1981 (age 44); San Bernardino, California, U.S.

Playing career
- 2001: Riverside CC
- 2002–2003: Oklahoma
- 2003: Vancouver Canadians
- 2004: Modesto A's
- 2005–2006: Stockton Ports
- 2006–2007: Midland RockHounds
- 2007–2008: Sacramento River Cats
- 2008: Colorado Springs Sky Sox
- 2008: Tulsa Drillers
- Position: Infielder

Coaching career (HC unless noted)
- 2011: UC Riverside (H/IF)
- 2012–2018: UC Santa Barbara (H/IF/RC)
- 2019: San Jose State (H/IF/RC)
- 2020–2022: Cal State Northridge (H/RC)
- 2023–present: Cal State Northridge

Head coaching record
- Overall: 104–103
- Tournaments: NCAA: 0–0

Eduardo Cornejo (born November 19, 1981) is a baseball coach and former infielder, who is the current head baseball coach of the Cal State Northridge Matadors. He played college baseball at Riverside Community College in 2001 before transferring to Oklahoma. He played professionally from 2003 to 2008.

== Playing career ==
Cornejo grew up in San Bernardino, California, where he attended Jurupa Valley High School. Cornejo would go on to play college baseball for the Riverside Community College. As a freshman at Riverside Community College in 2001, Connejo had a .368 batting average, a .438 on-base percentage (OBP), and a .492 slugging percentage (SLG), with three home runs. As a sophomore in 2002, he transferred to the University of Oklahoma, Cornejo batted .325 with a .411 SLG, 17 doubles, and 31 RBIs. As a junior in 2003, he batted .393 with a .509 SLG, 2 home runs, and 49 RBIs.

Cornejo was drafted by the Oakland Athletics in the 13th round of the 2003 Major League Baseball draft. He signed with the Athletics on June 6, 2003, forgoing his senior year of eligibility in college. He would play the next five years in the Athletics organization, never advancing above Triple-A. He was released, and signed with the Colorado Rockies organization where he would finish out the 2008 season. He announced his retirement in 2009.

== Coaching career ==
Cornejo began his coaching career in 2011, as an assistant for the UC Riverside Highlanders. He would join the staff of the UC Santa Barbara Gauchos the following season. He left the Gauchos following the 2018 season to join the staff of the San Jose State Spartans. He would join Dave Serrano's staff on the Cal State Northridge Matadors for the 2020 season. When Serrano announced that he would be retiring following the 2022 season, Cornejo was named the head coach of the Matadors beginning with the 2023 season.

== Head coaching record ==
Record table
Season	Team	Overall	Conference	Standing	Postseason
Cal State Northridge Matadors (Big West Conference) (2023–present)
2023	Cal State Northridge	34–17	20–10	T-2nd	
2024	Cal State Northridge	30–24	16–14	6th	
2025	Cal State Northridge	15–34	10–20	9th	
2026	Cal State Northridge	25–28	12–18	8th	
Cal State Northridge:		104–103	58–62		
Total:		104–103			
National champion Postseason invitational champion Conference regular season champion Conference regular season and conference tournament champion Division regular season champion Division regular season and conference tournament champion Conference tournament champion
