= Donna Sheng =

Condensed matter physicist

Don-Ning "Donna" Sheng is a condensed matter physicist whose research involves two-dimensional systems including the fractional quantum Hall effect and quantum spin Hall effect, as well as the natural emergence of supersymmetry in topological superconductors. She is a professor of physics at California State University, Northridge, and is also affiliated with the Princeton Center for Complex Materials at Princeton University.

== Education and career ==
Sheng earned a bachelor's degree in 1984 and a Ph.D. in 1989 from Nanjing University. She joined the faculty at California State University, Northridge in 2000, after working as a researcher in the Texas Center for High Temperature Superconductivity at the University of Houston since 1990.

At California State University, Northridge, more than half of the students are female, and in 2014 80% of the honors students from science and mathematics were female. As part of the university's system of encouragement for women in STEM fields, Sheng runs a support group for female physics majors.

== Recognition ==
In 2012, California State University, Northridge gave Sheng their Preeminent Scholarly Publications Award. In 2013, she was named a Fellow of the American Physical Society (APS), after a nomination from the APS Division of Condensed Matter Physics, "for insights into topological and strongly correlated phases of matter using computational methods". In 2025, Sheng was elected to the American Academy of Arts and Sciences.
