= Stan Charnofsky =

American psychologist, academic, and baseball coach (1931–2024)

- Born: 11 July 1931; Trenton, New Jersey, U.S.
- Died: December 29, 2024 (aged 93); Los Angeles, California, U.S.
- Education: University of Southern California (B.S. Physical Ed, M.S., M.Ed, Ed.D. in Counseling Psychology)
- Occupations: Educator; Baseball coach
- Employer(s): California State University, Northridge
- Notable work: Educating the Powerless (1972); When Women Leave Men: How Men Feel, How Men Heal (1992)
- Title: Professor of Educational Psychology & Counseling; Head baseball coach (1962–1966)
- Spouse: Norene (Moore) Charnofsky
- Children: Three
- Awards: CSUN Distinguished Teaching Award (2016); CSUN Athletic Hall of Fame (2016)

Stan Charnofsky (1931–2024) was an American psychologist, educator, and former professional baseball player. He was a professor and administrator at California State University, Northridge (CSUN) for more than five decades and founded its Marriage, Family, and Child Counseling program. Before joining the CSUN faculty, he played professional baseball. Charnofsky later became head coach of the CSUN Matadors baseball team. Charnofsky was inducted into the CSUN Athletic Hall of Fame in 2016.

Charnofsky with Casey Stengel and brother Hal to right; Yankee Stadium, 1953.

== Early life and education ==
Stanley Charnofsky and his identical twin brother, Harold (Hal), were born on July 11, 1931 in Trenton, New Jersey, to immigrant Jewish parents from Ukraine. The family later moved to Los Angeles, where Charnofsky attended Abraham Lincoln High School. He and his brother both received academic scholarships to the University of Southern California (USC), where they played baseball under coach Rod Dedeaux. Charnofsky was an All-Pacific Coast Conference first-team selection and co-captain of the USC baseball team.

Charnofsky earned his B.S. in Physical Education from USC in 1953, followed by an M.S. in Physical Education in 1958. He later completed an M.Ed. in Counseling (1961) and an Ed.D. in Counseling Psychology (1965), both from USC.

== Baseball career ==
After graduating from USC, Charnofsky signed with the New York Yankees and played seven seasons in the minor leagues, including stints with the Binghamton Triplets and Augusta Tigers. He set an Eastern League double-play record and was briefly called up to the majors. During his career, he also served in the United States Air Force for two years.

Charnofsky later became the head coach of the CSUN Matadors baseball team (then San Fernando Valley State College) from 1962 to 1966. In 1965, he led the Matadors to their first conference championship (in the California Collegiate Athletic Association) and had several players drafted into Major League Baseball. Sportscaster Dick Enberg was Charnofsky's assistant coach at CSUN early in his tenure as head coach.

== Academic career ==
Charnofsky joined the CSUN faculty in the mid-1960s, and in 1970 founded the Marriage, Family, and Child Counseling program, now known as Marriage and Family Therapy. He was also Chair of the Department of Educational Psychology and Counseling, Director of the CSUN Educational Opportunities Program (EOP), and publicly supported minority students during the campus protests of 1968.

Charnofsky also founded the MFCC/MFT Alumni Network and the Center in Educational Psychology’s Workshop Program in 1983. He received the CSUN Distinguished Teaching Award in 2016. He retired from his faculty position in 2021 at the age of 89.

== Publications ==
Charnofsky authored multiple books and academic texts, including Educating the Powerless (1972), When Women Leave Men: How Men Feel, How Men Heal (1992), The Deceived Society (2005), and Therapy with Couples: A Humanistic Approach (2006). He also wrote over 30 novels, short stories, and articles.

== Personal life ==
Charnofsky was married to Norene Moore, and together they had three children.

== Legacy ==
A scholarship was established in Charnofsky's name at CSUN to support students pursuing careers in education, psychology, and counseling.

== Death ==
Charnofsky died on December 29, 2024, at the age of 93.
