= Adam Kennedy =

American baseball player (born 1976)

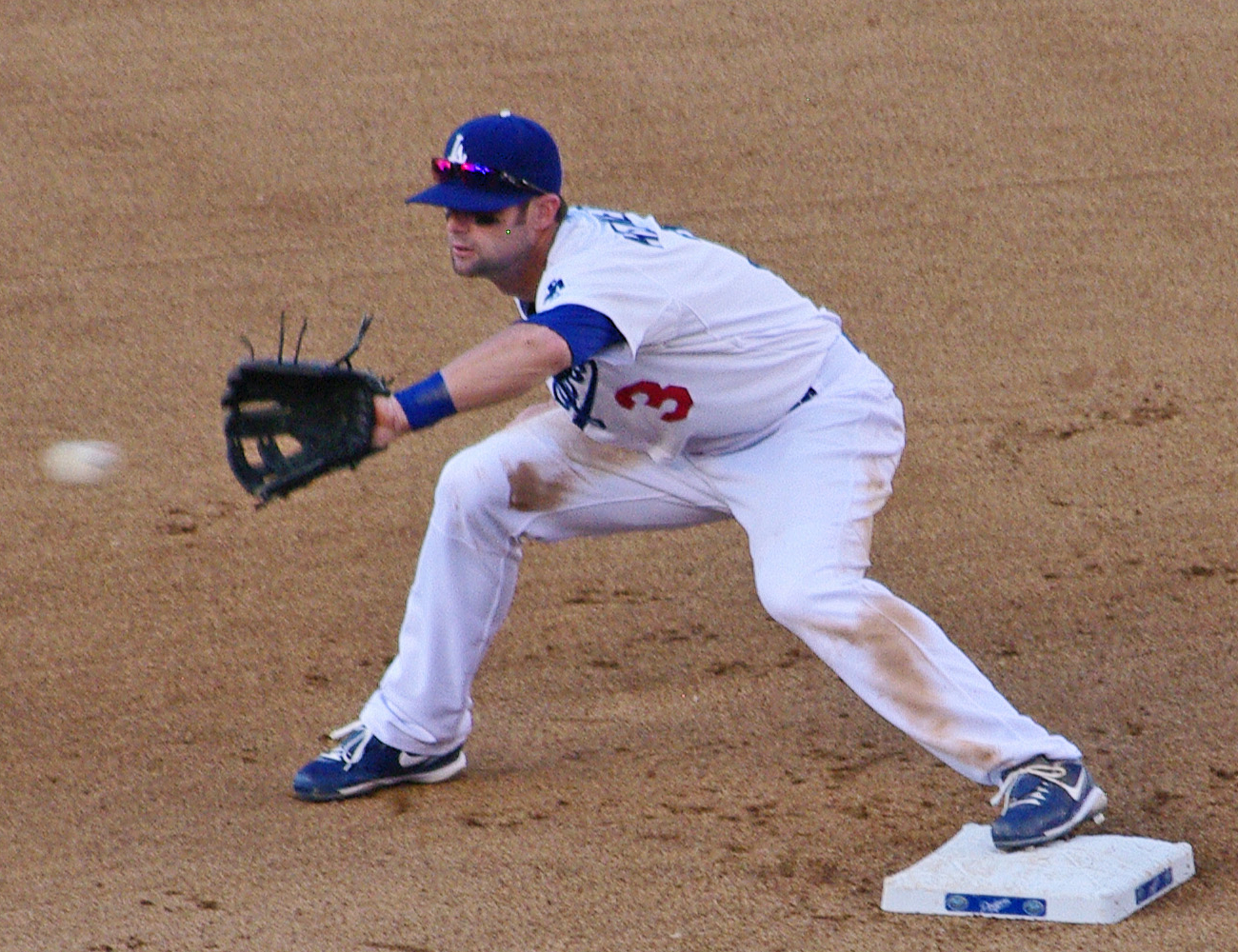
- Kennedy with the Los Angeles Dodgers
- Second baseman
- Born: January 10, 1976 (age 50); Riverside, California, U.S.
- Batted: Left Threw: Right

MLB debut
- August 21, 1999, for the St. Louis Cardinals

Last MLB appearance
- September 7, 2012, for the Los Angeles Dodgers

MLB statistics
- Batting average: .272
- Home runs: 80
- Runs batted in: 571
- Stats at Baseball Reference

Teams
- St. Louis Cardinals (1999); Anaheim Angels / Los Angeles Angels of Anaheim (2000–2006); St. Louis Cardinals (2007–2008); Oakland Athletics (2009); Washington Nationals (2010); Seattle Mariners (2011); Los Angeles Dodgers (2012)

Career highlights and awards
- World Series champion (2002); ALCS MVP (2002)
Medals
Men's baseball
Representing United States
Pan American Games
Silver medal – second place	1999 Winnipeg	Team competition

Adam Thomas Kennedy (born January 10, 1976) is an American former professional baseball second baseman. He played in Major League Baseball (MLB) for the St. Louis Cardinals, Oakland Athletics, Los Angeles Angels of Anaheim, Washington Nationals, Seattle Mariners, and Los Angeles Dodgers.

== Early years and amateur career ==
Kennedy was born in Riverside, California. He attended John W. North High School in Riverside, playing baseball and basketball. His father coached baseball and taught at North High School.

Kennedy attended Cal State Northridge, where he played shortstop for the Matadors. He set school records in career hits, runs batted in (RBI), and batting average and was a three-time All-American. He led the nation in hits as a sophomore and junior. In 1996, he played collegiate summer baseball with the Falmouth Commodores of the Cape Cod Baseball League.

== Playing career ==
=== St. Louis Cardinals ===
Kennedy was drafted in the first round (20th overall) by the St. Louis Cardinals in the 1997 MLB draft. In 1999 with the Memphis Redbirds, he hit .327 with 10 home runs and 63 RBI. He was selected as a Pacific Coast League All-Star and a Baseball America first-team Minor League All-Star.

He made his MLB debut on August 21, 1999, for the Cardinals against the New York Mets at second base. He was hitless in four at-bats in that game. His first MLB hit was a three-RBI double to left field the next day off Orel Hershiser of the Mets. His first MLB home run came on August 31 against Brian Meadows of the Florida Marlins. He appeared in 33 games for the Cardinals in 1999, hitting .255 with 1 home run and 16 RBIs. In the 2000 offseason, the Cardinals signed former All-Star Fernando Viña to start at second base, making Kennedy, who hadn't separated himself from his infield counterparts, expendable.

=== Anaheim Angels/Los Angeles Angels of Anaheim ===
On March 23, 2000, Kennedy was traded to the Anaheim Angels along with All-Star pitcher Kent Bottenfield for outfielder Jim Edmonds.

Kennedy matched a team record with eight RBI in 16–10 win over the Blue Jays on April 18, 2000.

Kennedy would finish his rookie season, batting .266/.300/.403 with 9 home runs and 72 RBIs. He received a single vote in AL Rookie of the Year voting, tying him for sixth place with Steve Cox, Mark Redman and Barry Zito.

In the 2001 season, Kennedy hit .270/.318/.372 with 6 home runs and 40 RBIs. Kennedy was the team's starting second baseman, but showed only marginal improvement following a strong rookie campaign.

The 2002 season was Kennedy's breakthrough year, as it established him as a fixture in the Angels infield. During the regular season, he hit .312/.345/.449 with 7 home runs and 52 RBIs, as the Angels earned a wild card berth, their first playoff appearance in 16 years.

In Game 5 of the 2002 American League Championship Series against the Minnesota Twins, Kennedy hit three home runs, joining only nine other players who hit three homers in a postseason game: Babe Ruth, Bob Robertson, Reggie Jackson, George Brett, Adrián Beltré, Albert Pujols, Pablo Sandoval, Jose Altuve, and Enrique Hernández. Kennedy's performance helped the Angels clinch the American League pennant, and Kennedy was named the series' Most Valuable Player. For the series, Kennedy hit .357 with 3 home runs and 5 RBIs. The Angels went on to beat the San Francisco Giants in seven games in the World Series, earning Kennedy a World Series ring. In the 2002 entire postseason, Kennedy hit .340 with 4 home runs, after only hitting 7 home runs in 143 regular season games.

The 2003 season was a season of ups and downs for Kennedy, he hit a career-high 13 home runs, and his walk rate increased over 5% (3.7% in 2002 to 8.8% in 2003), but his average dropped to .269 and he struggled to repeat his 2002 success as the Angels failed to make the postseason and defend their World Series title. Despite this, on December 19, 2003, Kennedy agreed to a 3-year, $8.85 million contract that would keep him in Anaheim through the 2006 season.

Kennedy's 2004 campaign was eerily similar to his 2003 one, he hit .278 with 10 home runs and 48 RBIs. Despite his inconsistent play, the Angels were in contention for a playoff spot down the stretch. On September 20, during a game against the Seattle Mariners, Kennedy suffered a torn ACL & MCL in his right knee while attempting to field a single up the middle from Ichiro Suzuki, which caused him to miss the remainder of the season, including the Angels final playoff push and eventual playoff run.

The 2005 season was somewhat of a resurgence for Kennedy, as he hit exactly .300, but only hit 2 home runs and had just 37 RBIs, both of which were career-lows since he became an everyday player. The Angels once again won the AL West to qualify for the postseason, were they faced the New York Yankees in ALDS. Despite a overall subpar series, where he hit just .235 over the 5 games, Kennedy came up clutch in the decisive Game 5, hitting a triple off of future Hall of Famer Mike Mussina in the second inning, driving in two runs to give the Angels a 3–2 lead that they would never relinquish. In 2005 ALCS, Kennedy hit .286 for the series, but had just 4 hits and 1 RBI, as the Angels lost to the Chicago White Sox in 5 games.

Kennedy's 2006 campaign was one filled with many question marks, as statistically he was closer to his numbers in his 2003 & 2004 seasons than his peaks in 2002 & 2005, as he hit .273 with 4 home runs and 55 RBIs. With his offensive performance declining, and being an impending free agent at the conclusion of the season, as well as top prospect Howie Kendrick rising through the minors, it was rumoured that the Angels would look to trade Kennedy at the trade deadline, most notably for Shea Hillenbrand. While the rumors never came to fruition, Kennedy was forced to share the starting second base position, playing in a platoon with the rookie Kendrick for the remainder of the season.

The national spotlight shone briefly on Kennedy on August 16, 2006, when he took part in a bench-clearing brawl in the ninth inning of a game between the Texas Rangers and the Angels. Tensions between the two division rivals were already high, as two Rangers starting pitchers — Adam Eaton and Vicente Padilla — had been ejected in previous games that month for throwing at Angels batters. Also, two Angels hurlers (Kevin Gregg and Brendan Donnelly) had already been thrown out of the game for hitting batters, and manager Mike Scioscia and bench coach Ron Roenicke had been ejected as well. Rangers pitcher Scott Feldman hit Kennedy in the buttocks with a fastball with only one out remaining in the game, and his team up 9–3. Kennedy charged the mound, triggering a fight. As Kennedy charged him, Feldman stood on the mound and threw down his glove, and when Kennedy reached him, Feldman then hit Kennedy in the armpit with a punch. Kennedy was suspended for four games for his actions.

At the end of the 2006 season, Kennedy became a free agent and with Kendrick set to take over the starting spot at second base, Kennedy was informed by general manager Bill Stoneman that he would not be retained.

In seven seasons with the Angels, Kennedy hit .280 in 992 games, with 51 home runs and 353 RBI.

=== Return to St. Louis ===
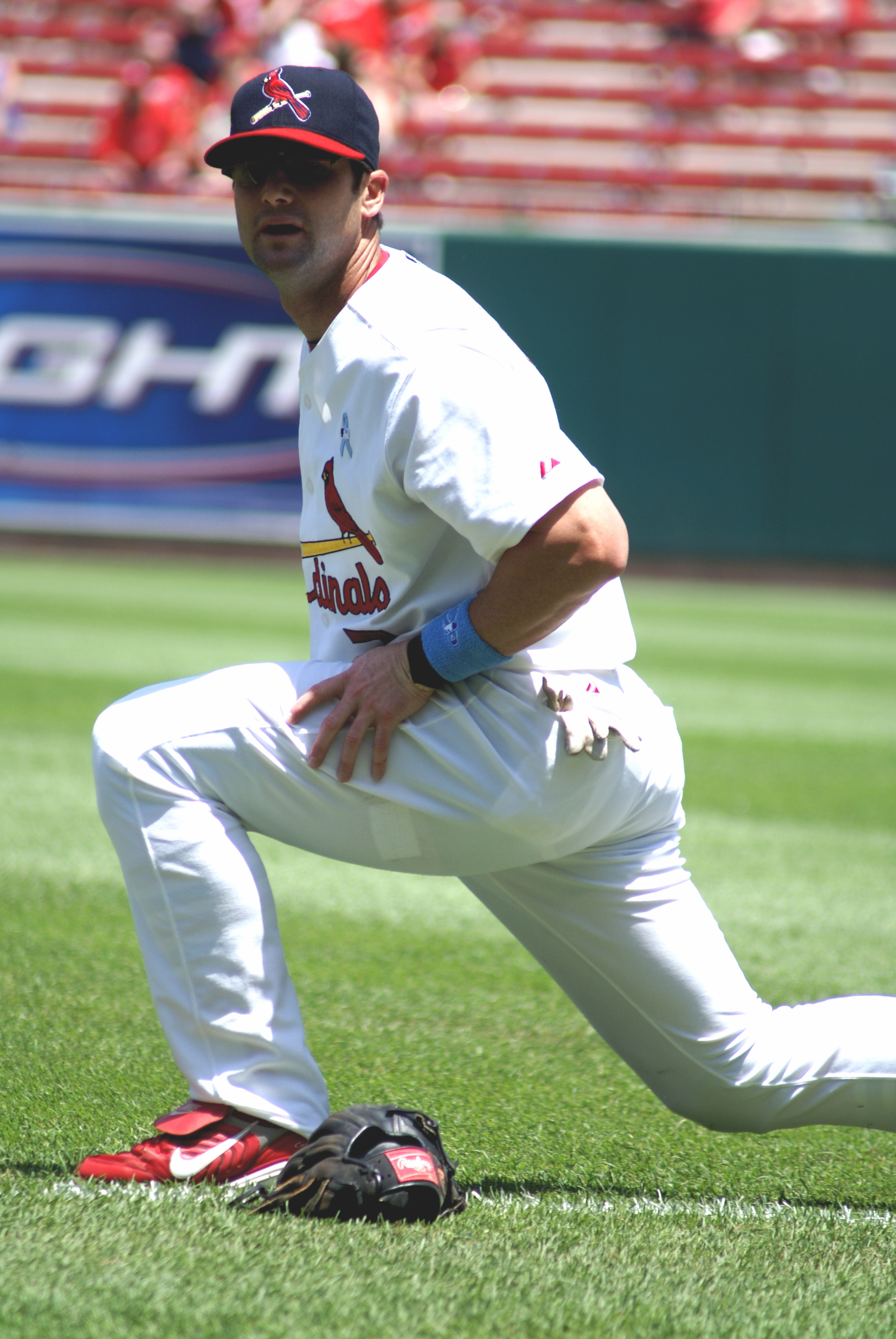
Adam Kennedy with Cardinals in 2008.

On November 28, 2006, he signed a 3-year, $10 million contract with his former team, the St. Louis Cardinals.

On August 11, 2007, Kennedy was placed on the 15-day disabled list with a torn medial meniscus in his right knee, an injury that would sideline him for the remainder of the season. He appeared in 87 games prior to the injury, and hit only .219, the lowest average of his career.

In 2008, he played in 115 games and hit .280 with just 2 home runs and 36 RBIs. Following the season, Kennedy requested a trade, stating that his desired role as a starter was not being fulfilled as the Cardinals acquired Felipe López to play second base down the stretch.

On February 9, 2009, 6 months after his trade request, Kennedy was released by the team with a year remaining on his contract.

=== Tampa Bay Rays ===
On February 17, 2009, Kennedy signed a minor league deal with the Tampa Bay Rays. The Rays assigned him to the AAA Durham Bulls, his first minor league action since 2005. With the Bulls, he hit .280 in 23 games.

=== Oakland Athletics ===
On May 8, 2009, Kennedy was traded to the Oakland Athletics for Joe Dillon. His contract was purchased the next day. He appeared in 129 games for the Athletics, mostly at third base and second base, batting .289 with 11 home runs.

=== Washington Nationals ===
On February 12, 2010, Kennedy signed with the Washington Nationals on 1-year, $1.75 million contract. He played in 135 games for the Nationals, hitting .249. He mostly played second base, but also appeared in 51 games at first base, the first time he had seen any regular time at that position in his career.

=== Seattle Mariners ===
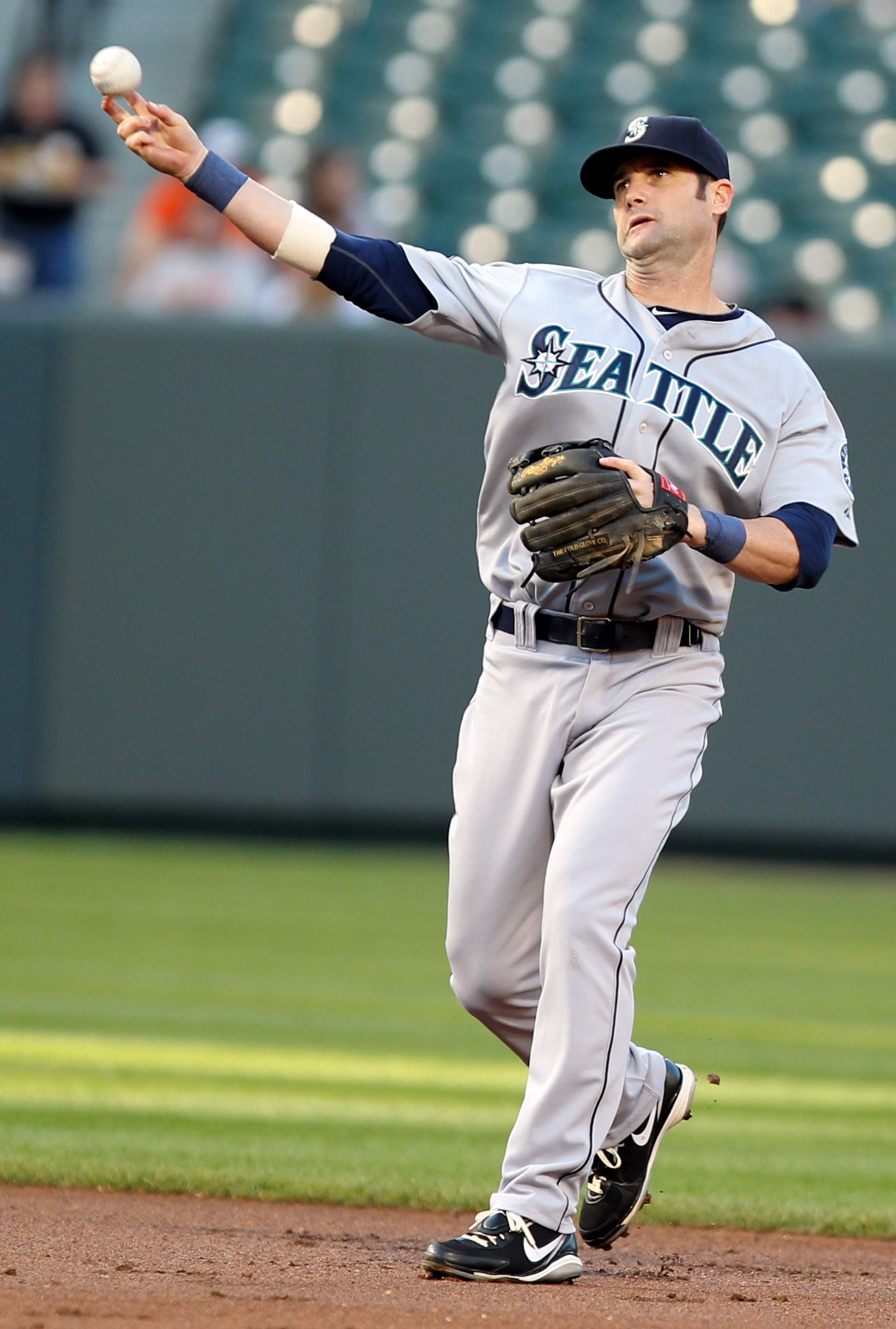
Kennedy with the Mariners in 2011

On January 10, 2011, Kennedy signed a minor-league contract with the Seattle Mariners. He made the team out of spring training and served as a utility infielder, seeing action at first base, second base, and third base during the year while hitting .234 in 114 games. Midway through the season, he replaced former Angels teammate Chone Figgins as the starting third baseman. He elected free agency on October 30.

=== Los Angeles Dodgers ===
On December 1, 2011, Kennedy signed a one-year contract with the Los Angeles Dodgers. In 86 games with the Dodgers, mostly as a pinch hitter (with occasional starts at second and third), Kennedy hit .262. A strained right groin put him on the disabled list and ended his season early, on September 11.

== Post-playing career ==
After his playing career ended, Kennedy opened a baseball academy.

== See also ==
- List of California State University, Northridge people
- List of Major League Baseball career assists as a second baseman leaders
- List of Major League Baseball career games played as a second baseman leaders
- List of people from Riverside, California
- Los Angeles Angels award winners and league leaders
