= S. K. Ramesh =

Indian-American engineer and educator

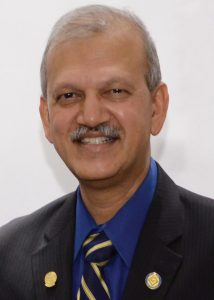
- Education: National Institute of Technology, Tiruchirappalli, Southern Illinois University, Carbondale
- Occupation: Professor
- Organization: California State University, Northridge

S. K. Ramesh is a professor of Electrical and Computer Engineering and former Dean of the College of Engineering and Computer Science at California State University, Northridge, United States.

== Education ==
Ramesh graduated with the Bachelor of Engineering degree (Honors) in Electronics and Communication Engineering in 1981 from Regional Engineering College, Tiruchirappalli (now known as National Institute of Technology, Tiruchirappalli), formerly affiliated to University of Madras, India and received the Master of Science and Doctorate of Philosophy degrees in Electrical Engineering in 1983 and 1986 respectively from Southern Illinois University, Carbondale, United States.

== Career ==
Ramesh began his professional career as professor of Electrical and Electronics Engineering at California State University, Sacramento and served as the Department Chair beginning in 1994. He served as Dean of the College of Engineering and Computer Science at California State University, Northridge from 2006-2017, and professor of Electrical and Computer Engineering at CSUN from 2017 to the present. Ramesh was elected president of the Accreditation Board for Engineering and Technology, Inc. (ABET) in 2021.

Ramesh is a Fellow of Institute of Electrical and Electronics Engineers, the world's largest technical professional organization.
