= Kathleen Lowe Melde =

American engineer and academic

- Occupations: Electrical engineer; academic

Academic background
- Education: California State University, Long Beach (BS); California State University, Northridge (MS); University of California, Los Angeles (PhD)

Kathleen Lowe Melde is a Professor and Associate Dean in Electrical Engineering at the University of Arizona in Tucson. She was named a Fellow of the Institute of Electrical and Electronics Engineers (IEEE) in 2012 for her contributions to tunable antennae and their integration in electrical packaging.

Melde received a B.S. from California State University, Long Beach in 1985, an M.S. from California State University, Northridge in 1987, and a Ph.D. from the University of California, Los Angeles in 1996, all in electrical engineering.
