= Ida B. Kinney =

American civil rights activist and teacher

Ida B. Kinney (née Ford; May 25, 1904 – January 1, 2009) was an African-American civil rights activist and teacher.

== Early life ==
Ida Ford, the granddaughter of slaves, was born in Lafayette County, Arkansas, the only child to Henry B. Ford and Bessie White. From age three, Ida lived with her grandparents, James T. and Anna Mariah White, who were former slaves that bought themselves out of slavery with the sale of cotton. They were very industrious people who taught her valuable lessons about the ethics of life and putting God first. During the early 1900s, women were not allowed to read or write so Kinney, a young girl, taught her grandmother to read and write, using the Bible.

In 1920 Kinney, then 16, moved to California. Kinney and her mother lived in Santa Monica until she graduated from Santa Monica High School. She attended Philander Smith College in Arkansas for one year.

Kinney returned to the old Vermont Campus of the University of California, Los Angeles for her second year of college where she met her first husband, Carl Binion, who died a decade later from a war injury from World War I. She moved to the San Fernando Valley in 1940, and returned to school to continue her education where she graduated with a bachelor's degree from what was then San Fernando Valley State College.

== Activism and career ==
Having been refused a teacher's license, Kinney protested and petitioned the California governor Pat Brown for help, which resulted in her receiving her credentials by order of the governor within ten days. Her 84-year journey for civil rights began, which would include marches, protests and associations, with the likes of, among others, Rosa Parks, Dr. Martin Luther King Jr. and Medger Evers.

In December 1942, Kinney became a pioneer member of Great Community Missionary Baptist Church in Pacoima under the leadership of the late Rev. T.G. Pledger, Organizer/Pastor. In 1952, she met and married Perry Kinney. They were married for over 50 years until his death at age 104 in 2004.

Kinney was an elementary school teacher, first as a substitute in Ken County and then for the Los Angeles Unified School District. She was influential in the struggle to allow black women in the hospital located in Van Nuys, California. In addition, she started the Head Start Program.

One of the first blacks to work for Lockheed Aerospace, she campaigned and was successful in opening the doors for black workers to join the union.

She was appointed to the commission on aging for the County of Los Angeles, where she served actively for 12 years. She was in the forefront of establishing a center for seniors in the Valley. Former Councilmen Howard Finn credits Kinney with the building of the multipurpose senior center which opened in 1971 in the Pacoima neighborhood of Los Angeles.. She also played a key role in developing the Boys & Girls Club in the Pacoima neighborhood.

Kinney was also honored by the NAACP on her 100th birthday as being a member of its organization since May 1955. This honor resulted in a commendatory U.S. postal stamp, being commissioned and soon to be released.

== Death ==
Ida B. Kinney died in Lake View Terrace, California, aged 104.

== See also ==
- Lists of centenarians
- List of University of California, Los Angeles people
