= Robert H. Todd =

- Born: July 6, 1942
- Died: October 31, 2025 (aged 83)
- Education: California State University, Northridge (BS); Stanford University (M.S., Ph.D.)

Robert (Bob) H. Todd (born 1942) is an American engineer and Emeritus Professor of Mechanical Engineering at Brigham Young University (BYU) and a fellow of the American Society for Engineering Education.

Todd received a bachelor's degree from California State University, Northridge and an MS from Stanford University, and holds a Ph.D. from Stanford University. In 1971, he was serving as a counselor to Bishop Henry B. Eyring in the Stanford Ward of The Church of Jesus Christ of Latter-day Saints when Bishop Eyring was called to be the new president of Ricks College. Todd accepted an invitation to become the first professor of mechanical engineering at Ricks to have a Ph.D. He then joined the faculty of Brigham Young University in 1989, where he was appointed Professor of Mechanical Engineering. He developed BYU's mechanical engineering capstone program which was begun in 1990. Among other assignments at BYU, Todd has served as the coach of the Formula SAE racing team. Todd retired at the BYU in 2013.

Todd wrote the Manufacturing Processes Reference Guide (1991) along with Dell K. Allen and Leo Alting, and has written papers on the capstone project primarily with Spencer P. Magleby and Carl D. Sorenson.

== Publications ==
Books, papers, articles, a selection:

- 1991. Integrated Product and Process Design: Industry and Academia Working Together to Develop a Senior Capstone Design Course. With Spencer P. Magleby, Carl D. Sorensen.
- 1994. Manufacturing processes reference guide. With Dell K. Allen, and Leo Alting.
- 1994. Fundamental principles of manufacturing processes, With Dell K. Allen, and Leo Alting.
