= Ann E. Watkins =

American mathematician

Ann Esther Watkins is an American mathematician and statistician specializing in statistics education. She edited the College Mathematics Journal from 1989 to 1994, chaired the Advanced Placement Statistics Development Committee from 1997 to 1999, and was president of the Mathematical Association of America from 2001 to 2002.

Watkins is an emeritus professor of mathematics at California State University, Northridge (CSUN), her alma mater. She graduated from CSUN in 1970, and earned a master's degree there in 1972. She completed her Ph.D. in 1977 from the University of California, Los Angeles.

With Richard L. Scheaffer, she is the author of statistics textbooks including Activity-Based Statistics, Statistics: From Data to Decision, and Statistics in Action: Understanding a World of Data.

She was elected as a fellow of the American Statistical Association in 1999 "for innovative contributions to curriculum and pedagogy; for masterful teaching, and teaching of teachers; and for an extraordinary record of sustained and successful efforts to institutionalize reform in statistics education." She won the United States Conference on Teaching Statistics Lifetime Achievement Award in 2015.
