= Judith H. Hibbard =

American health researcher and academic

Judith Hoffman Hibbard is the senior researcher of the Health Policy Research Group at the University of Oregon. She is also the professor emerita of the university's Department of Planning, Public Policy, and Management. Her research mostly concerns topics such as health literacy and how consumers utilize health information, and patient activation.

== Education ==
In 1974, Hibbard received her bachelor's degree in health sciences at California State University, Northridge. She received a master's degree in Health Education and Behavioral Sciences from the University of California, Los Angeles in 1975. She earned her doctorate in 1982 from the University of California, Berkeley with a degree in Social and Administrative Health Services. Thesis: Hibbard, Judith Hoffman (June 1982). Gender roles, illness orientation, and the use of medical care (Thesis (Dr. of Public Health)). University of California, Berkeley.

== Accomplishments ==
In 2014, Hibbard was named one of the 3000 most highly cited researchers by Thomson Reuters. That same year, she was listed as one of "The World's Most Influential Scientific Minds". Hibbard has been a part of many commissions and advisory councils throughout her career such as the National Advisory Council for the Agency for Healthcare Research and Quality, the United Health Group Advisory Panel, the National Health Care Quality Forum, and the National Advisory Council for the Robert Wood Johnson Foundation's Aligning Forces for Quality Initiative. She was also a speaker for the Mayo Clinic Center of Innovation's 2014 Transform event. Hibbard was the lead researcher of a team that worked to develop the Patient Activation Measure and gave a presentation on patient activation at the 2010 King's Fund Annual Conference. Performed a study funded by U.S. Department of Health's Agency for Healthcare Research and Quality
