= Peter W. Schramm =

American political scientist and academic (1946–2015)

- Born: December 3, 1946; Győr, Hungary
- Died: August 16, 2015 (aged 68); Ashland, Ohio, U.S.

Education
- Education: California State University, Northridge B.A. in History 1971; Claremont Graduate School M.A. in Government 1975; The London School of Economics M.A. in International History 1975; Claremont Graduate School Ph.D. in Government 1980

Philosophical work
- Institutions: Ashbrook Center at Ashland University
- Main interests: U.S. history, political philosophy

Peter W. Schramm (December 23, 1946 – August 16, 2015) was an American academic and political scientist. He was a professor of political science at Ashland University and the former executive director of the Ashbrook Center for Public Affairs in Ashland, Ohio.

== Early life and education ==
Schramm was born in Soviet-occupied Hungary in 1946. His father fled with their family to the U.S. during the Hungarian Uprising of 1956, explaining to his 10-year-old son, "We were born Americans, but in the wrong place." He recalled his early years and relations with his father in several articles, deriving therefrom a philosophy of the U.S. and the U.S. idea which has defined much of his academic pursuits.

Schramm attended Hollywood High School in Hollywood, California upon arriving in the U.S. (although he spoke no English at the time). He went on to earn a Bachelor of Arts degree from California State University Northridge, and two Master of Arts degrees, the first in Government from the Claremont Graduate School and the second in International History from the London School of Economics. He received a Ph.D. in government from the Claremont Graduate School in 1981.

== Career ==
Early in his career, Schramm served as president of the Claremont Institute for the Study of Statesmanship and Political Philosophy in Claremont, California, until the institute encountered financial problems. He later served in the Reagan Administration as the director of the Center for International Education in the United States Department of Education. Turning back to academics, Schramm then became a professor of political science at Ashland University and director of special programs of the Ashbrook Center for Public Affairs in 1987.

He became executive director of the Ashbrook Center in 1995 following the resignation and subsequent death of Charles Parton. In 2006, he also took on the role of chairman of the Master of American History and Government Program at Ashland University, a program that he helped to create. He has taught courses on U.S. political thought, great U.S. texts, Abraham Lincoln, Shakespeare and the "Human Being and Citizen".

Schramm provided daily commentary on current events at the Ashbrook Center for Public Affairs weblog, "No Left Turns". He edited, co-edited, and contributed to a number of books, including, Natural Right and Political Right, The 1984 Election and the Future of American Politics, Lessons of the Bush Defeat, American Political Parties and Constitutional Politics, Consequences of the Clinton Victory, Separation of Powers and Good Government, Statecraft and Power, History of American Political Thought, The Heritage Guide to the Constitution, Why Coolidge Matters, Booker T. Washington: A Re-Examination and wrote the Introduction to Lord Charnwood's Abraham Lincoln: A Biography (Madison Books, 1996). He has lectured at the Heritage Foundation, Stanford University and the International Conservative Congress in Washington, D.C. He was a senior fellow of the Claremont Institute and a former president of the Philadelphia Society.

== Recognition ==
Schramm was honored by the United States Citizenship and Immigration Services in 2007 as an "Outstanding American by Choice." He was a seven time recipient of the Mentor Teaching Award at Ashland University.

== See also ==
- Ashland University
