= Kathleen Utgoff =

American economist and government official

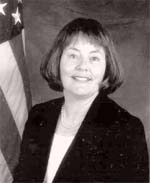

Commissioner of Labor Statistics Bureau of Labor Statistics
- In office July 2002 – July 2006
- President: George W. Bush
- Preceded by: Katharine Abraham
- Succeeded by: Keith Hall

Personal details
- Education: California State University, Northridge (BA); UCLA (PhD)

Kathleen Utgoff is an American economist. She was Commissioner of the Bureau of Labor Statistics from 2002 to 2006.

== Education ==
Utgoff holds a BA degree in economics from California State University, Northridge, and a PhD in economics from UCLA (1978).

== Career ==
Utgoff began her career at the Center for Naval Analyses and served as a senior economist at the Council of Economic Advisers during the Reagan administration. President Reagan appointed her as executive director of the Pension Benefit Guarantee Corporation in 1985.

During her time as Commissioner of the Bureau of Labor Statistics, BLS increased the number of data series published and expanded internet-based data collection. Utgoff is also credited with establishing an "unofficial motto" for BLS: "When asked whether the glass is half full or half empty, the bureau’s response is, It’s an eight-ounce glass with four ounces of liquid."

=== Selected works ===
- Utgoff, Kathleen Classen. "Compensation levels and quit rates in the public sector." Journal of Human Resources (1983): 394–406.
- Utgoff, Kathleen P., and Zvi Bodie. "The PBGC: A costly lesson in the economics of federal insurance." In Government Risk-Bearing, pp. 145–166. Springer, Dordrecht, 1993.
- Utgoff, Kathleen P. "Pension Reform Strengthens Defined-Benefit Plans." Compensation and Benefits Management 4 (1988): 273–5.
