= Michael Ferejohn =

American academic and philosopher

Michael Ferejohn (born 1945) is a Professor of Philosophy at Duke University, and the author of the books The Origins of Aristotelian Science and Formal Causes: Definition, Explanation, and Primacy in Socratic and Aristotelian Thought. He received his A.B. from San Fernando Valley State College (now California State University, Northridge) and his doctorate from the University of California, Irvine. Prior to teaching at Duke, he held a Mellon Faculty Fellowship at Harvard University. Ferejohn specializes in ancient philosophy, epistemology, and logic. He received the Richard K. Lublin Distinguished Award for Teaching Excellence in 2012 at Duke University.
