= List of women presidents or chancellors of co-ed colleges and universities =

Current and former female presidents or chancellors of co-ed colleges and universities are listed in order of the inaugural year.

== United States ==
- Julia Sears, 1872–1873, Mankato Normal School (now Minnesota State University, Mankato)
- Mary A. Hill, 1900–1901, Anna Draper, 1901–1903, Bertha Pinkham Dixon, 1903–1904, and Matilda Atkinson, 1904–1909, Training School for Christian Workers (now Azusa Pacific University)
- Lucy Robertson, 1902–1913, Greensboro Female College (now Greensboro College)
- Mary Hayes Allen, 1906–1908, Virginia Theological Seminary and College (now Virginia University of Lynchburg)
- Emma Elizabeth Johnson, 1925–1927, Johnson University (Kimberlin Heights, TN)
- Mary Elizabeth Branch, 1930–1944, Huston–Tillotson University (Austin, TX)
- Kate Galt Zaneis, 1935–1937, Southeastern Oklahoma State Teachers College (now Southeastern Oklahoma State University)
- Miriam Parker Schumacher, 1944–1967, Southwestern University (now Southwestern Law School)
- Mary McLeod Bethune, 1941–1942 and 1946–1947, Bethune-Cookman College (now Bethune-Cookman University)
- Isabel McKay, 1951–1965, Embry-Riddle Aeronautical Institute
- Gertrude Shapiro, 1952–1971, New Hampshire School of Accounting and Secretarial Science, then renamed New Hampshire College (now Southern New Hampshire University)
- Dora E. Kirby, 1959–1977, Woodbury University
- Sr. Doris Smith, S.C., 1972–1992, College of Mount Saint Vincent
- Lorene Rogers, 1974–1979, The University of Texas at Austin
- Marjorie Downing Wagner, 1974–1976, Sonoma State College
- Alice Frey Emerson, 1975–1991, Wheaton College (Massachusetts)
- Virginia Radley, 1977–1988, SUNY Oswego, https://ww1.oswego.edu/president/profile/virginia-radley
- Hanna Holborn Gray, 1977–1978, Yale University (acting); 1978–1993, University of Chicago
- Gail Fullerton, 1978–1991, San Jose State University
- Barbara Uehling, 1978–1979, University of Missouri, and 1987–1994, University of California, Santa Barbara
- Sister Thomas Welder, 1978–2009, University of Mary (formerly Mary College in Bismarck, North Dakota)
- Janet Eisner, 1979–2022, Emmanuel College
- Betty Siegel, 1981–2006, Kennesaw State University (Kennesaw, Georgia)
- Julia M. McNamara, 1982–2016, Albertus Magnus College
- Sharon Y. Hart, 1997-2000 (Middlesex Community College, CT); 2000-2006 (North Dakota State College of Science); 2011-2016 (Northern Marianas College); 2016-2019 (Rochester Institute of Technology (A.U.K) Kosovo.
- Sharon C. Diaz, 1982–2018, Samuel Merritt University
- Juliet V. García, 1986–1991, Texas Southmost College
- Diana Natalicio, 1988–2019, University of Texas at El Paso
- Donna Shalala, 1988–1993, University of Wisconsin-Madison
- Blenda J. Wilson, 1988–1992, University of Michigan - Dearborn; 1993–1999, California State University, Northridge
- Rita Bornstein, 1990–2004, Rollins College
- Juliet V. García, 1991–2014, University of Texas at Brownsville
- Jahnae H. Barnett, 1990–2021, (co-ed from 1996), William Woods University
- Mary L. Smith, 1991–1998, Kentucky State University
- Dale Rogers Marshall, 1992–2004, Wheaton College (Massachusetts)
- Jean A. Dowdall, 1993–1995, Simmons University (Boston, MA)
- Nannerl O. Keohane, 1993–2004, Duke University
- Sister M. Elise Kriss, 1993–2019, University of Saint Francis (Indiana)
- Karen W. Morse, 1993–2008, Western Washington University
- Donna M. Carroll, 1994–2021, Dominican University (River Forest, Illinois)
- Mary Sue Coleman, 1995–2002, University of Iowa
- Sandra Featherman, 1995–2006, University of New England
- Karen S. Haynes, 1995–2004, University of Houston-Victoria
- Paula M. Rooney, 1995–2022, Dean College
- Kathleen H. Goeppinger, 1995–2025, Midwestern University
- Linda J. Kaminski, 1995–2024, Yakima Valley College
- Jane O'Meara Sanders, 1996–1997, Goddard College, 2004–2011 Burlington College
- Portia Shields, 1996–2005, Albany State University
- Deborah F. Stanley, 1997–2021, State University of New York at Oswego
- Molly Corbett Broad, 1997–2006, University of North Carolina
- Davie Jane Gilmour, 1998–2022, Pennsylvania College of Technology
- Marye Anne Fox, 1998–2004, North Carolina State University; 2004–2012, University of California, San Diego
- Lisa Rossbacher, 1988–2014, Southern Polytechnic State University (Marietta, Georgia)
- Jennifer L. Braaten, 1999–2002, Midland Lutheran College, 2002–2016, Ferrum College, interim, 2017–2020, Blackburn College
- Shirley Ann Jackson, 1999–2022, Rensselaer Polytechnic Institute
- Pamela Brooks Gann, 1999–2013, Claremont McKenna College
- R. Barbara Gitenstein, 1999–2018, The College of New Jersey
- Jolene Koester, 2000–2011, California State University, Northridge; 2022–2023, California State University System (interim)
- Jerilyn McIntyre, 2000–2009, Central Washington University
- Judy Genshaft, 2000–2019, University of South Florida
- Mildred García, 2001–2007, Berkeley College; 2007–2012, California State University, Dominguez Hills; 2012–2018, California State University, Fullerton; 2023–present California State University System
- Jane A. Karas, 2001–present, Flathead Valley Community College
- Shirley C. Raines, 2001–2013, University of Memphis
- Donna Shalala, 2001–2015, University of Miami
- Ruth Simmons, 2001–2012, Brown University
- Shirley M. Tilghman, 2001–2013, Princeton University
- Mary Sue Coleman, 2002–2014, University of Michigan
- Elaine Tuttle Hansen, 2002–2011, Bates College
- Karen A. Holbrook, 2002–2007, Ohio State University
- Kay Norton, 2002–2018, University of Northern Colorado
- Beverly Daniel Tatum, 2002–2015, Spelman College
- Denise Trauth, 2002–2022, Texas State University
- Nancy Cantor, 2004–2013, Syracuse University; 2014–present, Rutgers University
- Jo Ann M. Gora, 2004–2014, Ball State University
- Amy Gutmann, 2004–2022, University of Pennsylvania
- Karen S. Haynes, 2004–2019, California State University San Marcos
- Susan Hockfield, 2004–2012, Massachusetts Institute of Technology
- Denice Denton, 2005–2006, University of California, Santa Cruz
- Martha Dunagin Saunders, 2005–2007, University of Wisconsin-Whitewater; 2007–2012, University of Southern Mississippi; 2017–2025, University of West Florida
- Sandra Kurtinitis, 2005–present, Community College of Baltimore County
- Zorica Pantic, 2005–2019, Wentworth Institute of Technology
- Lou Anna Simon, 2005–2018, Michigan State University
- Susan C. Scrimshaw, 2006–2008, Simmons University (Boston, MA)
- Janet Cunningham, 2006–2022, Northwestern Oklahoma State University
- Maria Klawe, 2006–2023, Harvey Mudd College
- Danielle N. Ripich, 2006–2017, University of New England
- Ann Weaver Hart, 2006–2012, Temple University; 2012–2017, University of Arizona
- Drew Gilpin Faust, 2007–2018, Harvard University
- Sally Mason, 2007–2015, University of Iowa
- Gail Carberry, 2007–2017, Quinsigamond Community College
- Barbara Snyder, 2007–2020, Case Western Reserve University
- France Córdova, 2007–2012, Purdue University
- Virginia Hinshaw, 2007–2012, University of Hawaiʻi at Mānoa
- Judith A. Bense, 2008–2016, University of West Florida
- Margaret Drugovich, 2008–present, Hartwick College
- Helen G. Drinan, 2008–2020, Simmons University (Boston, MA)
- Linda P. Brady, 2008–2015, University of North Carolina at Greensboro
- Carolyn Martin, 2008–2011, University of Wisconsin-Madison; 2011–2022, Amherst College
- Susan Martin, 2008–2015, Eastern Michigan University; 2015–2016, San Jose State University (interim)
- Elsa A. Murano, 2008–2009, Texas A&M University
- Renu Khator, 2008–present, chancellor of the University of Houston System and president of the University of Houston
- Pamela Trotman Reid, 2008–2015, University of Saint Joseph
- Paula Allen-Meares, 2009–2015, University of Illinois at Chicago
- Bernadette Gray-Little, 2009–2017, University of Kansas
- M. R. C. Greenwood, 2009–2013, University of Hawaiʻi System
- Linda Katehi, 2009–2016, University of California, Davis
- Nancy L. Zimpher, 2009–2017, State University of New York System
- Barbara Couture, 2010–present, New Mexico State University at Las Cruces
- Waded Cruzado, 2010–2025, Montana State University
- Dana G. Hoyt, 2010–2020, Sam Houston State University
- Nivine Megahed, 2010–present, National Louis University
- Carolyn Meyers, 2010–2016, Jackson State University
- Mary Jane Saunders, 2010–2013, Florida Atlantic University
- Teresa Sullivan, 2010–2018, University of Virginia
- Regina Stanback Stroud, 2010–2019, Skyline College (San Bruno, CA) and 2019–present, Perlata Community College District
- Sandra K. Woodley, 2010–2017, University of Louisiana system; 2017–present, University of Texas of the Permian Basin
- Cheryl Evans, 2011–present, Northern Oklahoma College
- Susan Herbst, 2011–2019, University of Connecticut
- Carolyn Long, 2011–2022, West Virginia University Institute of Technology
- Mary Ellen Mazey, 2011–2017, Bowling Green State University
- Joy McDaniel, 2011–present, Murray State College
- Carol Quillen, 2011–2022, Davidson College
- Renée M. Wachter, 2011–present, University of Wisconsin-Superior
- Angela L. Walker Franklin, 2011–present, Des Moines University
- Phyllis Wise, 2011–2015, University of Illinois at Urbana–Champaign
- Judy L. Bonner, 2012–2015, University of Alabama at Tuscaloosa
- Jane C. Conoley, 2014–2025, California State University, Long Beach
- Cynthia Jackson Hammond, 2012–present, Central State University
- Mary A. Papazian, 2012–2016, Southern Connecticut State University; 2016–2021, San Jose State University
- Christina Paxson, 2012–present, Brown University
- Dianne F. Harrison, 2012–2021, California State University, Northridge
- Wendy Robinson, 2012–present, Helene Fuld College of Nursing
- Cheryl B. Schrader, 2012–2017, Missouri University of Science and Technology
- Clayton Spencer, 2012–2023, Bates College
- Rebecca Blank, 2013–2022, University of Wisconsin-Madison and President-designate of Northwestern University
- Barbara A. Farley, 2013–present, Illinois College
- Carol Folt, 2013–2019, University of North Carolina at Chapel Hill
- Morna K. Foy, 2013–present, Wisconsin Technical College System
- Glenda Baskin Glover, 2013–2024, Tennessee State University
- Karen M. Scolforo, 2013–present, Central Penn College
- Janet Napolitano, 2013–2020, University of California System
- Jeanie Webb, 2013–present, Rose State College
- Robin E. Bowen, 2014–2023, Arkansas Tech University
- Gwendolyn Boyd, 2014–2016, Alabama State University
- Rebecca Chopp, 2014–2019, University of Denver
- Sheri Everts, 2014–2024, Appalachian State University
- Carine M. Feyten, 2014–present, Texas Woman's University
- Leigh Goodson, 2014–present, Tulsa Community College
- Elmira Mangum, 2014–2016, Florida A&M University
- Melody Rose, 2014–2018, Marylhurst University
- Lisa Rossbacher, 2014–2019, California State Polytechnic University, Humboldt
- Cynthia Teniente-Matson, 2014–2022, Texas A&M University–San Antonio; 2023–present, San Jose State University
- Colette Pierce Burnette, 2015–2022, Huston–Tillotson University (Austin, TX)
- Ana Mari Cauce, 2015–2025, University of Washington
- Kina Mallard, 2015–2020, Reinhardt University
- Jaquie Moloney, 2015–present, University of Massachusetts Lowell
- Andrea Lewis Miller, 2015–2019, LeMoyne-Owen College (Memphis, TN)
- Fayneese Miller, 2015–present, Hamline University (Saint Paul, Minnesota)
- Valerie Smith, 2015–present, Swarthmore College (Swarthmore, Pennsylvania)
- Marion Terenzio, 2015–present, State University of New York at Cobleskill
- Margaret H. Venable, 2015–present, Dalton State College (Dalton, Georgia)
- Erika D. Beck, 2016–2020, California State University, Channel Islands; 2021–present, California State University, Northridge
- Laura Casamento, 2016–2023, Utica College
- Soraya M. Coley, 2016–2025, California State Polytechnic University, Pomona
- Gayle E. Hutchinson, 2016–2023, California State University, Chico
- Karla Hughes, 2016–present, University of Arkansas at Monticello
- Ellen Junn, 2016–present, California State University, Stanislaus
- Danielle Laraque-Arena, 2016–2019, State University of New York, (SUNY) Upstate Medical University
- Judy K. Sakaki, 2016–2022, Sonoma State University
- Claire E. Sterk, 2016–2020, Emory University
- Elissa Tenny, 2016–2024, School of the Art Institute of Chicago
- Cynthia Kelley, 2016–present, Madisonville Community College, KCTCS
- Sylvia Mathews Burwell, 2017–2024, American University (Washington, D.C.)
- Shirley M. Collado, 2017–2021, Ithaca College
- Laurie Aleta Carter, 2017–present, Shippensburg University
- Lorrie Clemo, 2017–present, D'Youville University, Buffalo, NY
- Beverly J. Davenport, 2017–2018, University of Tennessee
- Barbara Lettiere, 2017–present, Immaculata University
- Linda Livingstone, 2017–present, Baylor University
- Karol V. Mason, 2017–present, John Jay College of Criminal Justice
- Kelly M. Miller, 2017–present, Texas A&M University-Corpus Christi (Corpus Christi, Texas)
- Patricia Moulton, 2017–present, Vermont Technical College
- Katricia Pierson, 2017–present, East Central University
- Lana Reynolds, 2017–present, Seminole State College
- Cheryl B. Schrader, 2017–2019, Wright State University (Fairborn, Ohio)
- G. Gabrielle Starr, 2017–present, Pomona College
- Cynthia Warrick, 2017–present, Stillman College (Tuscaloosa, Alabama)
- Wendy Wintersteen, 2017–present, Iowa State University
- Alissa Young, 2017–present, Hopkinsville Community College (Hopkinsville, Kentucky)
- Ora Hirsch Pescovitz, M.D., 2017–present, Oakland University (Rochester, Michigan)
- Carmen Twillie Ambar, 2018–present, Oberlin College (Oberlin, Ohio)
- Roslyn Clark Artis, 2018–present, Benedict College (Columbia, SC)
- Irma Becerra, 2018–present, Marymount University(Arlington, VA)
- Neeli Bendapudi, 2018–2021, University of Louisville (Louisville, Kentucky)
- Martha Burger, 2018–present, Oklahoma City University (Oklahoma City, Oklahoma)
- Cathie Cline, 2018–present, East Arkansas Community College (Forrest City, Arkansas)
- Marion Ross Fedrick, 2018–present, Albany State University (Albany, Georgia)
- Merodie A. Hancock, 2018–present, Thomas Edison State University (Trenton, New Jersey)
- Michelle R. Johnston, 2018–present, College of Coastal Georgia (Brunswick, Georgia)
- Maud Mandel, 2018–present, Williams College (Williamstown, Massachusetts
- Lily McNair, 2018–2021, Tuskegee University
- Polly Peterson, 2018–present, Jamestown College (Jamestown, North Dakota)
- Tania Tetlow, 2018–2022, Loyola University New Orleans
- Adela de la Torre, 2018–present, San Diego State University
- Astrid S. Tuminez, 2018–present, Utah Valley University (Orem, Utah)
- Ruth V. Watkins, 2018–present, University of Utah (Salt Lake City, Utah)
- Lynnette Zelezny, 2018–present, California State University, Bakersfield
- Paige Comstock Cunningham, 2019–present, Taylor University (Upland, IN)
- Christina Drale, 2019–present, University of Arkansas Little Rock (Little Rock, Arkansas)
- Marcheta P. Evans, 2019–present, Bloomfield College(Bloomfield, New Jersey)
- Carol Folt, 2019–2025, University of Southern California
- Joan T.A. Gabel, 2019–2023, University of Minnesota (Minneapolis and Saint Paul, Minnesota)
- Kathleen E. Harring, 2019–2020, Muhlenberg College (Allentown, Pennsylvania)
- Anne Holton, 2019–2020, George Mason University (Fairfax, VA)
- Hilary L. Link, 2019–2022, Allegheny College (Meadville, PA)
- Sarah Mangelsdorf, 2019–present, University of Rochester (Rochester, New York)
- Joyce McConnell, 2019–present, Colorado State University (Fort Collins, Colorado)
- Wendy Raymond, 2019–present, Haverford College (Haverford, Pennsylvania)
- Terisa C. Riley, 2019–present, University of Arkansas-Fort Smith (Fort Smith, Arkansas)
- Lori S. White, 2020–present, DePauw University (Greencastle, Indiana)
- Gilda Barabino, 2020–present, Olin College (Needham, Massachusetts)
- Anne F. Harris, 2020–present, Grinnell College (Grinnell, Iowa)
- Kristina M. Johnson, 2020–present, Ohio State University (Columbus, OH)
- Courtney Martin, 2020–present, Ohio Valley College of Technology(East Liverpool, Ohio)
- Suzanne Rivera, 2020–present, Macalester College (Saint Paul, Minnesota)
- Lynn Wooten, 2020–present, Simmons University (Boston, MA)
- Lesia Crumpton-Young, 2021–present, Texas Southern University
- Barbara J. Wilson, 2021–present, University of Iowa
- Montserrat Fuentes, 2021–present, St. Edward's University (Austin, Texas)
- Terri Goss Kinzy, 2021–2023, Illinois State University
- Candice McQueen: 2021–present, Lipscomb University
- Patricia Okker, 2021–2023, New College of Florida
- Neeli Bendapudi, 2022–present, Penn State University
- Jennifer Bonds-Raacke, 2022–present, Saint Martin's University (Lacey, Washington)
- Nora Demleitner, 2022–present, St. John's College - Annapolis
- M. Elizabeth Magill, 2022–2023, University of Pennsylvania
- Jayathi Murthy, 2022–present, Oregon State University
- Tania Tetlow, 2022–present, Fordham University (New York City, New York)
- Nancy Niemi, 2022–present, Framingham State University (Framingham, Massachusetts)
- Michaele Whelan, 2022–present, Wheaton College (Massachusetts) Norton, Massachusetts
- Julie Sullivan, 2022–present, Santa Clara University (Santa Clara, California)
- Sally A. Kornbluth, 2023–President, Massachusetts Institute of Technology
- Sian Beilock, 2023–Present, Dartmouth College (Hanover, New Hampshire)
- Heather Hulburt Norris, 2024–Present, Appalachian State University
- Jeanette M. Nuñez, 2025-President, Florida Internacional University
- Susan Rundell Singer, president-elect, St. Olaf College (Northfield, Minnesota)
- Nemat (Minouche) Shafik, President-elect, Columbia University (New York City, New York)

== Australia ==
- Dianne Yerbury, 1987–2005, Macquarie University
- Ingrid Moses, 1997–2006, University of New England
- Janice Reid, 1998–2013, Western Sydney University
- Margaret Gardner, 2005–2014, RMIT University; 2014–present, Monash University
- Sandra Harding, 2007–2022, James Cook University
- Annabelle Duncan, 2014–2019, University of New England
- Margaret Sheil, 2018–present, Queensland University of Technology
- Brigid Heywood, 2019–2022, University of New England
- Deborah Terry, 2020–present, University of Queensland
- Patricia M. Davidson, 2021–present, University of Wollongong
- Harlene Hayne, 2021–present, Curtin University
- Renée Leon, 2021–present, Charles Sturt University

== Canada ==
- Pauline Mills McGibbon, 1971–1974, University of Toronto (Toronto, Ontario)
- Eva Mader MacDonald, 1974–1977, University of Toronto (Toronto, Ontario)
- Isabel Auld, 1977–1986, University of Manitoba (Winnipeg, Manitoba)
- Naomi L. Hersom, 1986–1991, Mount St Vincent University (Halifax, Nova Scotia)
- Rose Wolfe, 1991–1997, University of Toronto (Toronto, Ontario)
- Marie Smallface Marule, 1992–2014, Red Crow Community College (Kainai Nation, Alberta)
- Elizabeth Rollins Epperly, 1995–1998, University of Prince Edward Island (Charlottetown, Prince Edward Island)
- Emőke Szathmáry, 1996–2008, University of Manitoba (Winnipeg, Manitoba)
- Martha Piper, 1997–2006, University of British Columbia (Vancouver, British Columbia)
- Heather Munroe-Blum, 2003–2013, McGill University (Montreal, Quebec)
- Suzanne Fortier, 2013–2022, McGill University (Montreal, Quebec)
- Indira Samarasekera, 2005–2015, University of Alberta (Edmonton, Alberta)
- M. Elizabeth Cannon, 2010–2018, University of Calgary (Calgary, Alberta)
- D. Rose Patten, 2018–present, University of Toronto (Toronto, Ontario)
- Anne Mahon, 2019–present, University of Manitoba, (Winnipeg, Manitoba)

== Ecuador ==
- Cecilia A. Paredes, 2017–present, Escuela Superior Politecnica del Litoral (Guayaquil)
- Sonia A. Roca, 1997–present, Universidad Del Pacífico – Ecuador : Escuela de Negocios

== New Zealand ==
- Dawn Freshwater, 2020–present, University of Auckland
- Cheryl de la Rey, 2019–present, University of Canterbury
- Jan Thomas, 2018–present, Massey University

== Philippines ==
- Rosita L. Navarro, 2001–2006, Centro Escolar University (Manila)

== Turkey ==
- Gülsün Sağlamer, 1996–2004, Istanbul Technical University (Istanbul)
- Gülay Barbarosoğlu, 2012–2016, Boğaziçi University (Istanbul)

== United Kingdom ==
- Louise Richardson: 2009–2015, University of St Andrews; 2016–present, University of Oxford
- Sally Mapstone: 2016–present, University of St Andrews
- Elizabeth Treasure: 2017–present, Aberystwyth University
- Madeleine Atkins: 2018–present, Lucy Cavendish College, Cambridge University

== See also ==
- List of current and historical women's universities and colleges in the United States
- Timeline of women's colleges in the United States
- Seven Sisters (colleges)
