= Sunrise Mall =

Sunrise Mall may refer to:

- Sunrise Mall (Brownsville, Texas)
- Sunrise Mall (Corpus Christi), Texas
- Sunrise Mall (Citrus Heights, California)
- Sunrise Mall (New York), known as Westfield Sunrise from 2005-2020, East Massapequa, New York
- The Galleria at Fort Lauderdale, formerly the Sunrise Center, Fort Lauderdale, Florida
