= Julia M. McNamara =

- Education: Ohio Dominican University; Middlebury College; Yale University (Ph.D.)
- Employer: Albertus Magnus College
- Known for: Higher Education Administrator

Julia M. McNamara is a scholar of French literature, an academic administrator, and a former nun. She served as president of Albertus Magnus College in New Haven from 1982 to 2016.

McNamara grew up in Queens, New York and attended Dominican Academy. She earned degrees from Ohio Dominican University and Middlebury College before completing her PhD in French at Yale University, with a dissertation on Julien Green. A member of the Dominican Sisters of Peace until 1987, she joined the faculty of Albertus Magnus, founded by the order, in 1976, while studying for her PhD across town at Yale. McNamara was named a dean there in 1980. She presided over a thorough transformation of the college, beginning with the admission of men for the first time in 1985. She also expanded the college's fundraising efforts, succeeding in significantly adding to its endowment. She retired in 2016.

Outside of Albertus, McNamara has served on the board of Yale New Haven Hospital and other local charities. She was the first woman to serve on the Committee of the Proprietors of the Common and Undivided Lands, which oversees the New Haven Green.

In 2008, the New Haven Symphony Orchestra honored McNamara among its Women of Note, and in 2010 the Girl Scouts of Connecticut presented her with its Women of Achievement Award.
