= Cosgrove Marcus Messer Athletic Center =

Sports facility in New Haven, Connecticut, US

Coordinates: 41.33264°N 72.92293°W

- Interactive map of Cosgrove Marcus Messer Athletic Center
- Location: 700 Prospect Street, New Haven, CT 06511
- Operator: Albertus Magnus College
- Capacity: 600
- Surface: Hardwood

Construction
- Opened: 1989

Tenants
- Albertus Falcons; Connecticut Topballerz

The Cosgrove Marcus Messer Athletic Center is a sports facility located in New Haven, Connecticut. It is the home of the Albertus Magnus College Athletic Department and the school's basketball and volleyball team, the Falcons. It is also home to the Connecticut Topballerz of the American Basketball Association (ABA). The facility has a basketball/volleyball court, 25-yard pool, racquetball courts, and more. The team's center court, or “The Nest” as it is affectionately named by the students of the school features seating for 600 spectators.
