= Robin Bowen =

Robin Bowen may refer to:

- Robin E. Bowen, American college administrator
- Robin Huw Bowen (born 1957), Welsh harpist
