= David Swinton =

David Holmes Swinton
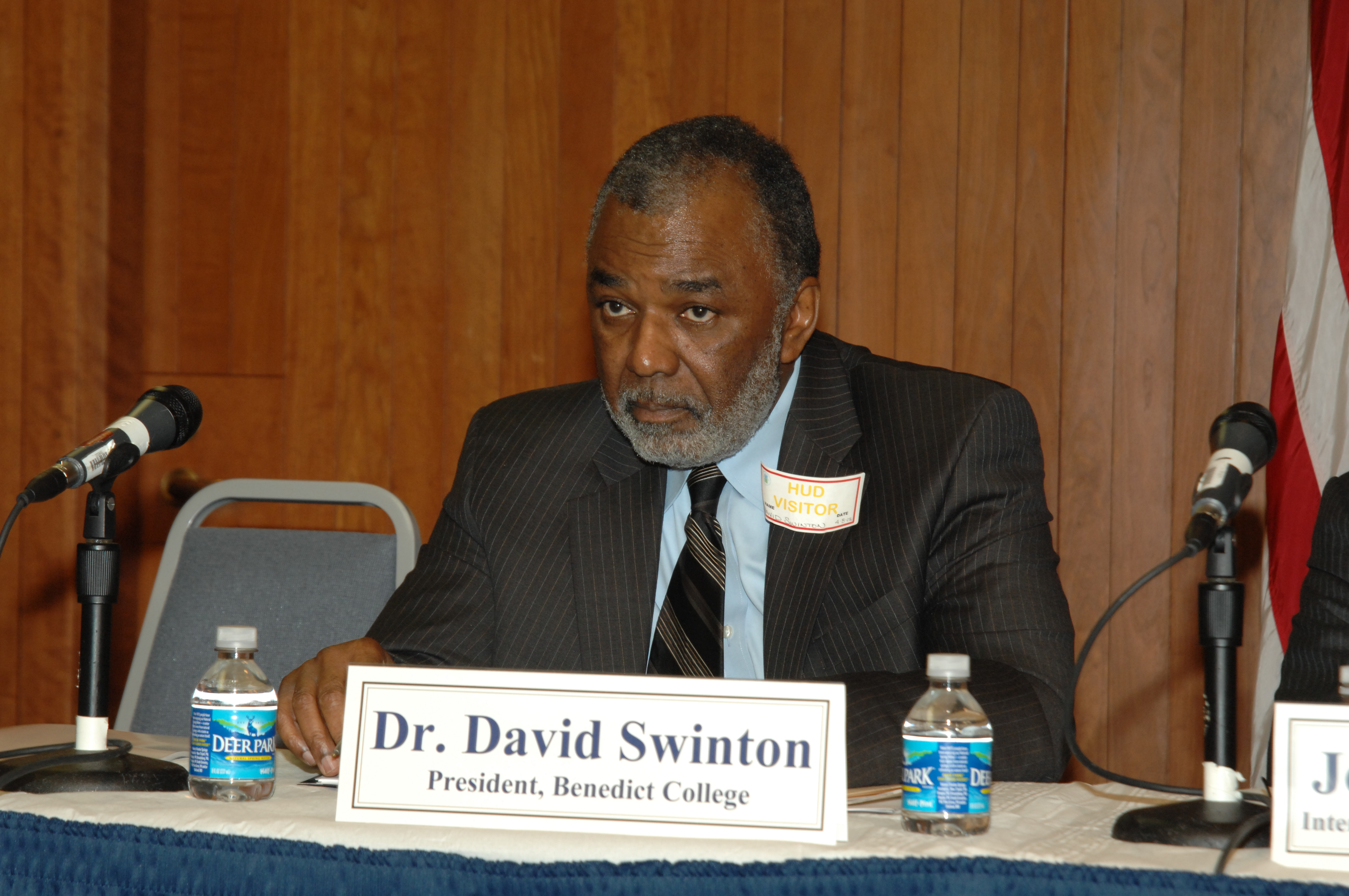
- Predecessor: Marshall C. Grigsby
- Successor: Roslyn Artis

Academic background
- Education: New York University, BA (1968); Harvard University, MA (1971); PhD (1975)

Academic work
- Discipline: Labor Economics
- Institutions: Clark Atlanta University; Jackson State University; Benedict College
- Awards: Samuel Z. Westerfield Award

David Holmes Swinton is an economist and president emeritus of Benedict College. He was awarded the Samuel Z. Westerfield Award by the National Economic Association in 2005, and in 2007, he was inducted into the South Carolina Black Hall of Fame.

== Education and early life ==
Born in New Haven, Connecticut, Swinton was raised in Timmonsville, South Carolina and New York City, where he graduated from Thomas Jefferson High School (Brooklyn). He studied economics at New York University, and earned a master's degree and doctorate in economics at Harvard University.

== Career ==
Swinton began his career teaching economics at Clark College, where he became director of the Southern Center of Studies in Public Policy. He then became dean of the school of business at Jackson State University. From 1994 to 2017, he was President of Benedict College.

=== Selected works ===
- Swinton, David. "Economic status of Blacks 1987." The state of black America (1988): 129–152.
- Swinton, David H. "A labor force competition theory of discrimination in the labor market." The American Economic Review 67, no. 1 (1977): 400–404.
- Handy, John, and David H. Swinton. "The determinants of the rate of growth of black-owned businesses: A preliminary analysis." The Review of Black Political Economy 12, no. 4 (1984): 85–110.
- Swinton, David H. The determinants of the growth of black owned businesses: a preliminary analysis. Vol. 1. Southern Center for Studies in Public Policy, Clark College, 1984.

== Personal ==
Swinton is married to Patricia Lewis Swinton, with whom he has six children, including economist Omari Swinton.
