= University of Texas at Brownsville =

Public university in Texas (1991–2015)

Coordinates: 25°53′57″N 97°29′30″W

The University of Texas at Brownsville
- Former names: Texas Southmost College; University of Texas-Pan American at Brownsville; University of Texas at Brownsville and Texas Southmost College
- Motto: Latin: Disciplina Praesidium Civitatis
- Motto in English: Cultivated mind is the guardian genius of democracy.
- Type: Public State University
- Active: September 1, 1991–June 30, 2015 (merged with UT–Pan American to form The UTRGV)
- Parent institution: UT System
- Endowment: US$12.5 million
- President: William Fannin
- Provost: Alan F. J. Artibise
- Academic staff: 279 (=fall 2013)
- Administrative staff: 1,326
- Students: 8,612 (fall 2013)
- Location: Brownsville, Texas, U.S.
- Campus: Urban, 524 acres (212 ha)
- Newspaper: UTB Collegian
- Colors: Orange, white, blue
- Nickname: Ocelots
- Sporting affiliations: Red River Athletic Conference; National Association of Intercollegiate Athletics
- Mascot: Ozzie the Ocelot
- Website: www.utb.edu
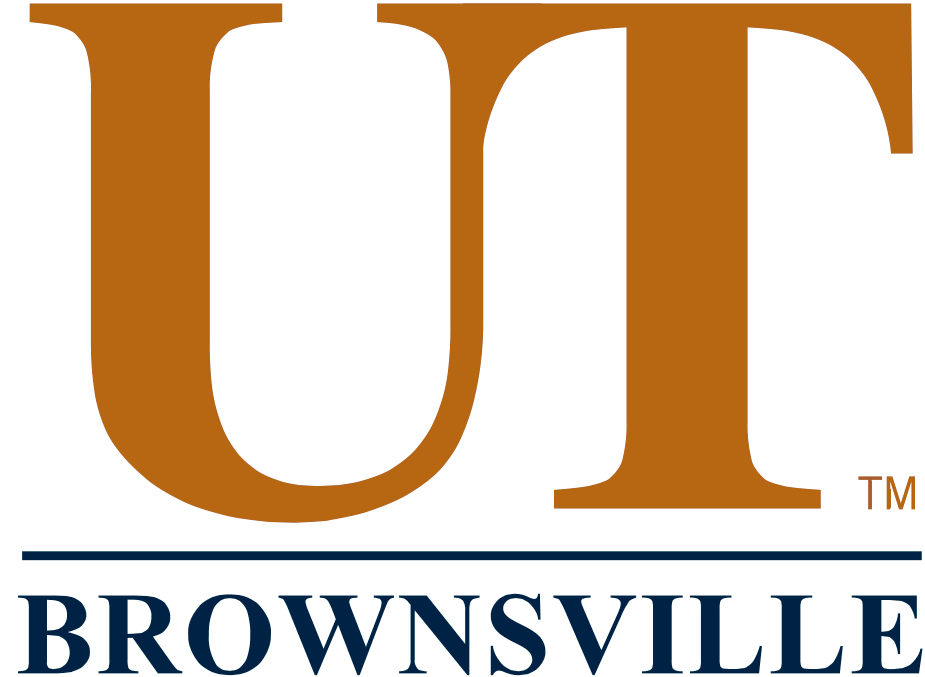

The University of Texas at Brownsville (abbreviated as UTB and formerly known as the University of Texas at Brownsville and Texas Southmost College [UTB/TSC]) was an educational institution located in Brownsville, Texas. The university was on the land once occupied by Fort Brown. It was a member of the University of Texas System. The institution was formed from a 1991 partnership between the two-year Texas Southmost College and University of Texas-Pan American at Brownsville. The partnership ended in 2011 as UTB became a standalone University of Texas institution, and Texas Southmost College returned to being an independent community college. UTB itself offered baccalaureate and graduate degrees in liberal arts, sciences, education, business, and professional programs.

In 2015, the UT Brownsville merged with UT–Pan American, to form The University of Texas Rio Grande Valley.

== History ==
=== Texas Southmost College ===
Texas Southmost College (TSC) was established in 1926 under the name "The Junior College of the Lower Rio Grande Valley." It admitted its first class on September 21 of that same year. In 1931, its name was changed to "Brownsville Junior College." In 1950, the institution was given the name, Texas Southmost College.

=== University of Texas-Pan American at Brownsville ===
In 1973, Texas Southmost College formed a partnership with Pan-American University, later known as the University of Texas-Pan American (UTPA). The partnership allowed Pan-American University to establish a four-year university in Brownsville. The resulting independent institution was referred to as Pan American University at Brownsville. In 1989, Pan American University joined the University of Texas System, creating the University of Texas Pan-American at Brownsville (UTPA-B). Brownsville sought a university directly under the UT System and in 1991 the University of Texas Pan-American at Brownsville became the University of Texas at Brownsville (UTB).

=== University of Texas at Brownsville-Texas Southmost College ===
After UTB was created, a partnership was established between UTB and TSC, allowing TSC students to seamlessly transition to the four year University without reapplying. The university has academic colleges including business, education, liberal arts and nursing. UTB-TSC's funding came from both the college tax district as well as the State of Texas. After failure to pass a 2002 multimillion-dollar bond, the TSC tax district voters successfully passed a $68 million bond issue to construct additional classrooms ($28 million), additional library space ($14 million), Workforce Training Classrooms ($17 million), Center for Early Childhood Studies ($4 million), and Center for Alzheimer's, Diabetes, Cancer, and Heart Disease ($5 million). Juliet V. García served as UTB-TSC President from 1991 to 2011; Garcia was the first Hispanic woman to be the president of a college or university in the United States.

=== End of educational partnership with Texas Southmost College ===
On November 10, 2010, the University of Texas System Board of Regents voted to end the University of Texas at Brownsville's educational partnership with Texas Southmost College. On February 17, 2011, the TSC Board of Trustees voted 4–3 to separate from UTB.

=== Merger with UTPA and Medical School ===
On December 6, 2012, the Board of Regents of The University of Texas System approved a proposal to merge UTB, the University of Texas–Pan American, and a planned medical school into one regional institution. On December 12, 2013, the UT Board of Regents voted to name the new university The University of Texas Rio Grande Valley.

On November 5, 2014, UTRGV's new nickname of Vaqueros was announced. Immediately, Students on both Campuses began protests objecting to the new name as a caricature and racial stereotype of Mexican, Latino, Chicano, and Hispanic culture.

On January 29, 2015 Texas Representative Terry Canales proposed Texas House Bill 901 which called for postponement of the naming of the new mascot.

On August 31, 2015, UTB and UTPA were officially dissolved and changed to the University of Texas Rio Grande Valley.

=== Previous names ===
The name of the institution evolved over the years:

- 1926–1931: The Junior College of the Lower Rio Grande Valley
- 1931–1949: Brownsville Junior College
- 1949–1992: Texas Southmost College
- 1992–2013: The University of Texas at Brownsville and Texas Southmost College
- 2013–2015: The University of Texas at Brownsville

=== Presidents ===
Dates of office	President	Notes
9/1/1991 – 12/31/1991	Homer J. Peña	Founding president
1/1/1992 – 8/31/2014	Juliet V. García	
9/1/2014 – 2015	William Richard Fannin	Interim CEO

== Admissions ==
Until the fall of 2011, UT Brownsville had open admissions, meaning prospective students had no admissions criteria. In August 2011 the University of Texas System Board of Regents approved new admission standards for UT Brownsville, and awaited the approval of the Southern Association of Colleges and Schools. The restricted UT Brownsville admissions began in the fall of 2013.

== Campus ==
UTB's campus sat on 524 acres (2.3 km^{2}) of land in the southern part of Brownsville, Texas, the part closest to the border with Mexico. A resaca, or oxbow lake, flows through the heart of the growing landscape. The university's unique architecture plays off the campus's rich history in Fort Brown. Many of the oldest buildings on campus remain from the old U.S. Army outpost. The university has also acquired many buildings in the surrounding area, including a former Holiday Inn hotel complex, former condominiums, the Amigoland Mall, and many historic buildings of downtown Brownsville. The university continues to expand, recently purchasing substantial acreage east of Fort Brown.

== Academics ==
=== Undergraduate colleges and schools ===
- College of Biomedical Sciences and Health Professions
- College of Applied Technology and General Studies
- College of Liberal Arts
- College of Science, Mathematics, and Technology
- School of Business
- College of Education
- School of Health Sciences

=== Notable academic programs ===
UTB was home to several academic centers and programs:

- Center for Gravitational Wave Astronomy Research focuses on astrophysical source modeling, gravitational wave data analysis, and the phenomenological astrophysics of gravitational wave sources.
- Center for Biomedical Studies was established to conduct biological and medical research on regional health issues and biotechnological approaches that may contribute to regional development.
- Center for Civic Engagement

== Student life ==
=== Student government ===
The Student Government Association at UTB hosts the officers of the student body. The SGA runs a three-branch system, with the executive board consisting of the Student Body Officers, the Legislative Board consisting of the Student Senate, and the Judicial Board consisting of the Chief and Associate Justices.

=== Student organizations ===
The university recognized more than 50 but less than 100 student organizations. In addition, it supported the Student Organization Council, an official student governance organization that represent student interests to faculty, and administrators.

=== Greek life ===
Sorority

- Sigma Psi Delta

=== Media ===
Students expressed their opinions in and outside of class through periodicals including The Collegian and the Sting Radio.

== Athletics ==
The Texas–Brownsville (UTB) athletic teams were called the Ocelots (formerly known as the Scorpions until after 2011–12 the school year). The university was a member of the National Association of Intercollegiate Athletics (NAIA), primarily competing in the Red River Athletic Conference (RRAC) from 2006–07 to 2014–15.

UTB competed in seven intercollegiate varsity sports: Men's sports included baseball, cross country, golf and soccer; while women's sports include cross country, golf, soccer and volleyball.

=== Accomplishments ===
The UTB Ocelots women's volleyball team was ranked #18 in the NAIA, but lost the standing after a bad 2008 season. In 2009, under new head coach Todd Lowery, formerly of National American University, the Scorpions began to shine again, achieving a #12 ranking in the NAIA. In December 2011, the UTB volleyball team won its first national championship.

=== Chess team ===
The University of Texas at Brownsville was widely regarded for having one of the strongest chess programs in the nation. In 2010, they placed second in the Final Four of College Chess, which they hosted.

== Notable alumni ==
- Oscar Casares, writer
- Jaime Zapata, U.S. Homeland Security special agent
