= Brownsville ITEC Center =

Shopping mall in Brownsville, Texas

- Location: Brownsville, Texas
- Coordinates: 25.9021°N 97.5104°W
- Address: 301 Mexico Boulevard
- Opened: 1974
- Closed: 2001 (renovated as Brownsville ITEC Center, 2002)
- Developer: Melvin Simon & Associates
- Owner: Texas Southmost College
- Num. of stores: 52
- Num. of anchor tenants: 4
- Floor area: 647,000 sq ft (60,100 m^{2})
- Floors: 1-2

Brownsville ITEC Center is a tech center in Brownsville, Texas. The building was previously an enclosed shopping mall called Amigoland Mall.

== History ==
On July 30, 1970, Melvin Simon & Associates announced plans for 530,000-square-foot (49,000 m^{2}) mall to accompany a proposed amusement park called Amigoland. The mall opened in 1974, with Montgomery Ward, JCPenney (which also featured a JCPenney Supermarket), and Dillard's as anchors. Other early tenants included McCrorys, Walgreens, Wyatt's Cafeteria, and a two-screen movie theater. It later gained Bealls as an additional anchor.

In 1999, both JCPenney and Dillard's relocated to nearby Sunrise Mall. The bankruptcy of Montgomery Ward in 2000 left the older mall devoid of anchors and shortly afterward, the mall was shuttered.

In 2002, the vacant mall was converted to classrooms and a tech center for Texas Southmost College.

In 2020, the facility underwent a major renovation handled by DMMC Engineering- David Martinez-McCarter, P.E, to renovate and retrofit four spaces into Pipe Fitting Lab, Welding training facilities, Industrial Maintenance classrooms, and Police Academy training classrooms for Texas Southmost College and was completed and inaugurated on late 2021
