= Jahnae H. Barnett =

American college administrator

- Born: 1974
- Citizenship: United States
- Education: Arkansas State University University of Mississippi
- Occupation: Academic
- Employer: William Woods University

Jahnae H. Barnett (born c. 1947) is an American college administrator who is President-Emeritus of William Woods University.

Barnett grew up in Caruthersville, Missouri, the daughter of Jerry and Delbert Harper. She entered college at the age of 16, skipping her senior year of high school to attend Arkansas State University. After her initial B.Sc. at ASU, she undertook further studies at the University of Mississippi, graduating with an M.B.E in 1967 and a Ph.D. in "higher education and student personnel services" in 1972. Barnett began her involvement with Williams Woods in 1973, joining the Department of Business and Economics. After a period as department chair, she was made a vice-president in 1983, with responsibility for admissions, retention, and development.

Barnett was appointed president of William Woods in April 1990, the first woman to hold the position and the first internal promotion in the university's history. She oversaw a number of major changes in her first few years as president, including the introduction of graduate programs in 1993 and the admission of the first male students in 1996. She was inducted into Omicron Delta Kappa, the National Leadership Honor Society, in 2009. Barnett also expanded the university beyond its original campus in Fulton, opening sites in Columbia and Jefferson City. Barnett lived on-campus in Fulton until 2011, when she moved into a new 15-acre property near New Bloomfield, donated by a former alumnus.

== See also ==
- List of women presidents or chancellors of co-ed colleges and universities
