= Sister Matilda =

American Catholic nun and painter (1887–1980)

Sister Matilda OP
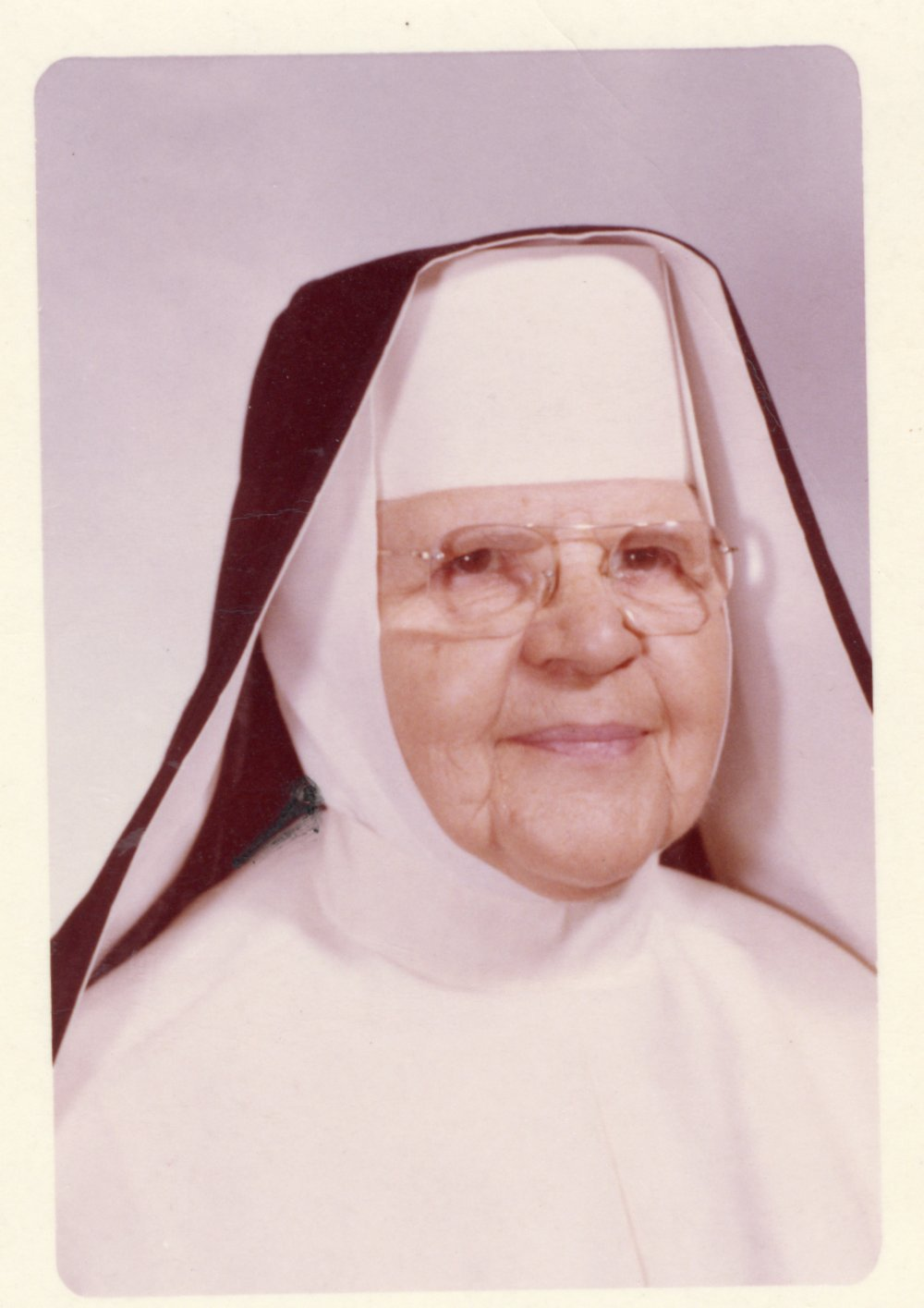

Personal life
- Born: Caroline Bechter; May 15, 1887 Akron, Ohio, U.S.
- Died: November 11, 1980 (aged 93) Akron, Ohio, U.S.

Religious life
- Religion: Christianity
- Denomination: Catholicism
- Order: Dominican Sisters of Peace

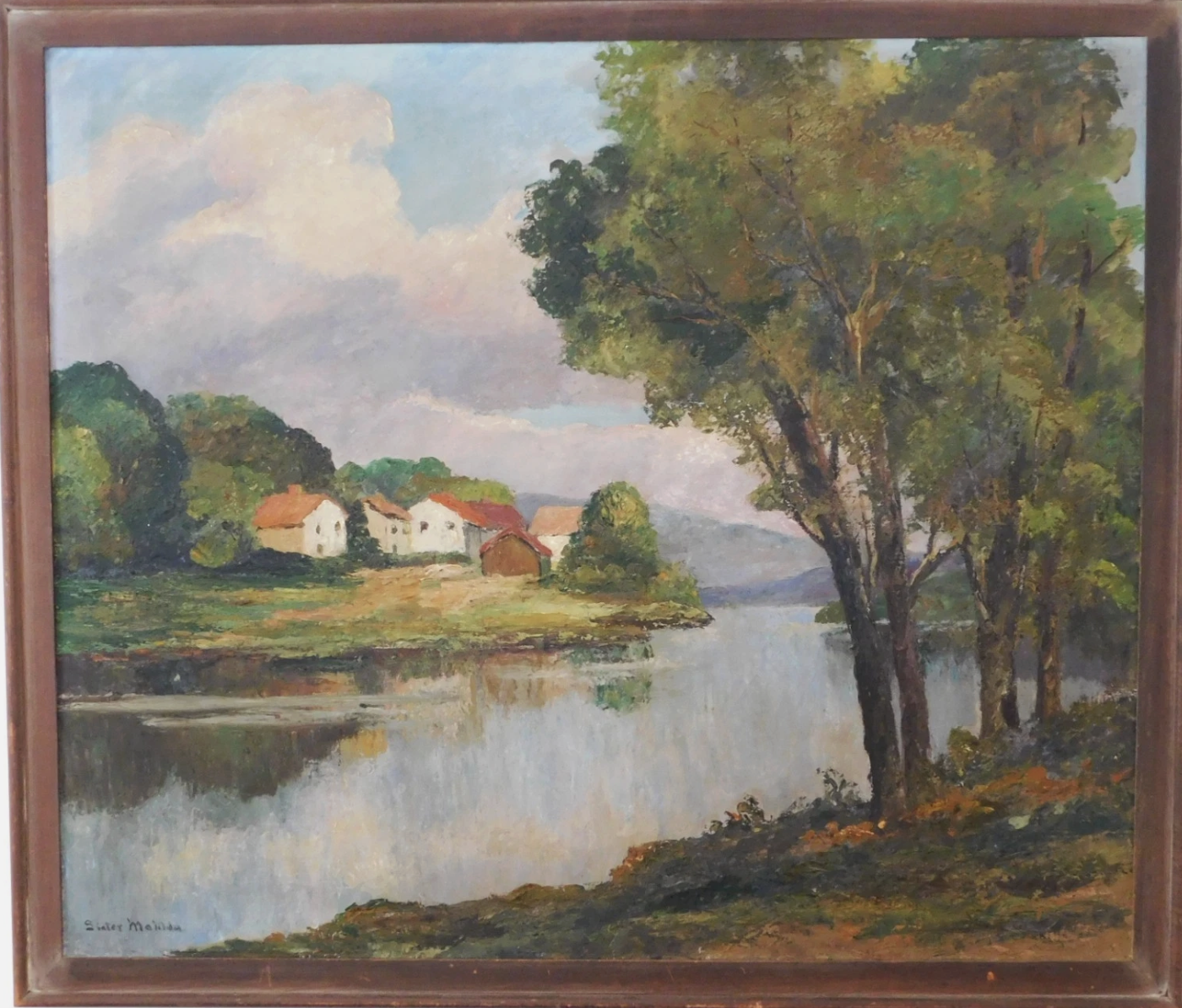
Landscape by Sister Matilda

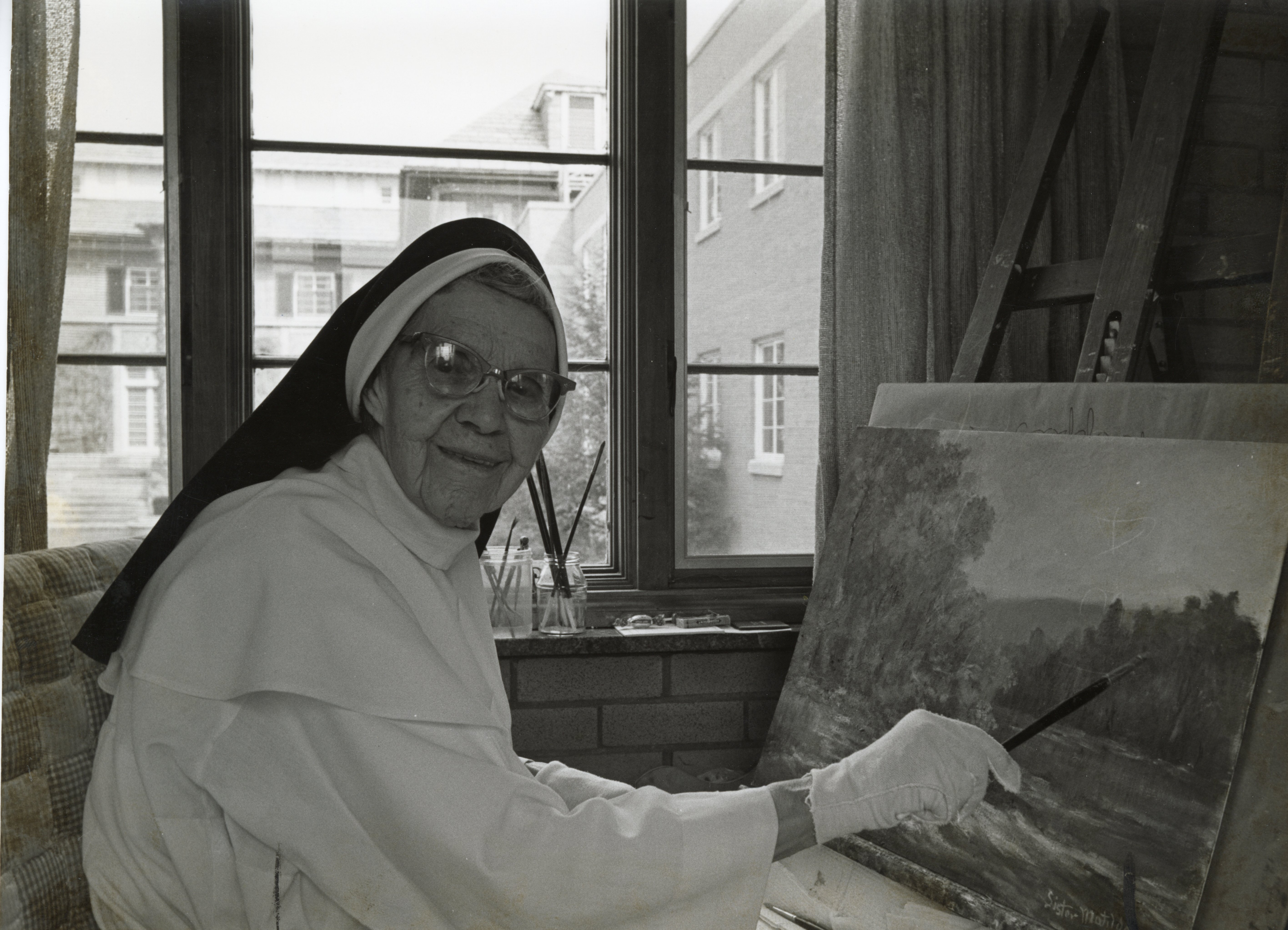

Caroline Bechter (May 15, 1887 – November 11, 1980), known by her religious name Sister Matilda OP, was an American artist, and a religious sister of the Dominican Sisters of Peace. She studied at the Royal Institute of Art in Florence, Italy, and the École des Beaux-Arts in Paris, France just before Germany invaded France in 1940; she was on a scholarship from the National Association of Women Painters and Sculptors, now the National Association of Women Artists. The sale of some of her paintings gave her congregation their financial start in Akron, Ohio in 1923. She took vows as a Sister of St. Dominic of the Immaculate Heart of Mary, but her congregation became the Dominican Sisters of Peace when it merged with six others in 2009, 29 years after her death.
