= Our Lady of the Elms High School =

Our Lady of the Elms School

Location
- 1375 West Exchange Street; Akron, (Summit County), Ohio 44313; United States; 41°6′10″N 81°33′30″W

Information
- School type: Private, all-girls Private
- Religious affiliation: Roman Catholic
- Established: 1923; 103 years ago
- Oversight: Dominican Order
- President: Deborah Farquhar Jones
- Dean: Walter Jacoby and Gabriel Eiser
- Grades: Pre-School–Grade 12
- Gender: Single Sex (Female)
- Student to teacher ratio: 8:1
- Campus size: 33 acres (130,000 m^{2})
- Colors: Black and white
- Sports: Soccer, golf, volleyball, tennis, basketball, track and field, softball, bowling, swimming
- Mascot: Elmer the Panther
- Team name: Panthers
- Accreditation: North Central Association of Colleges and Schools
- Publication: The Elms Magazine
- Newspaper: The Elm Leaf
- Yearbook: The Egress
- Tuition: $13,450
- Affiliation: Roman Catholic Diocese of Cleveland
- Website: www.theelms.org

Our Lady of the Elms School is a private, all-girls independent Catholic college preparatory high school in Akron, Ohio, United States. Our Lady of the Elms School was founded by the Sisters of St. Dominic (now Dominican Sisters of Peace) in 1923.

Ranked as one of the top private schools by Niche.com the Elms is the #1 Catholic High School in Summit County and the #1 All-Girls School in the Cleveland Diocese.

== Notable alumni ==
- River Butcher - Stand-up comedian
- Martha Firestone Ford
