= Omari Swinton =

Economist (b. 1980)

Omari Holmes Swinton
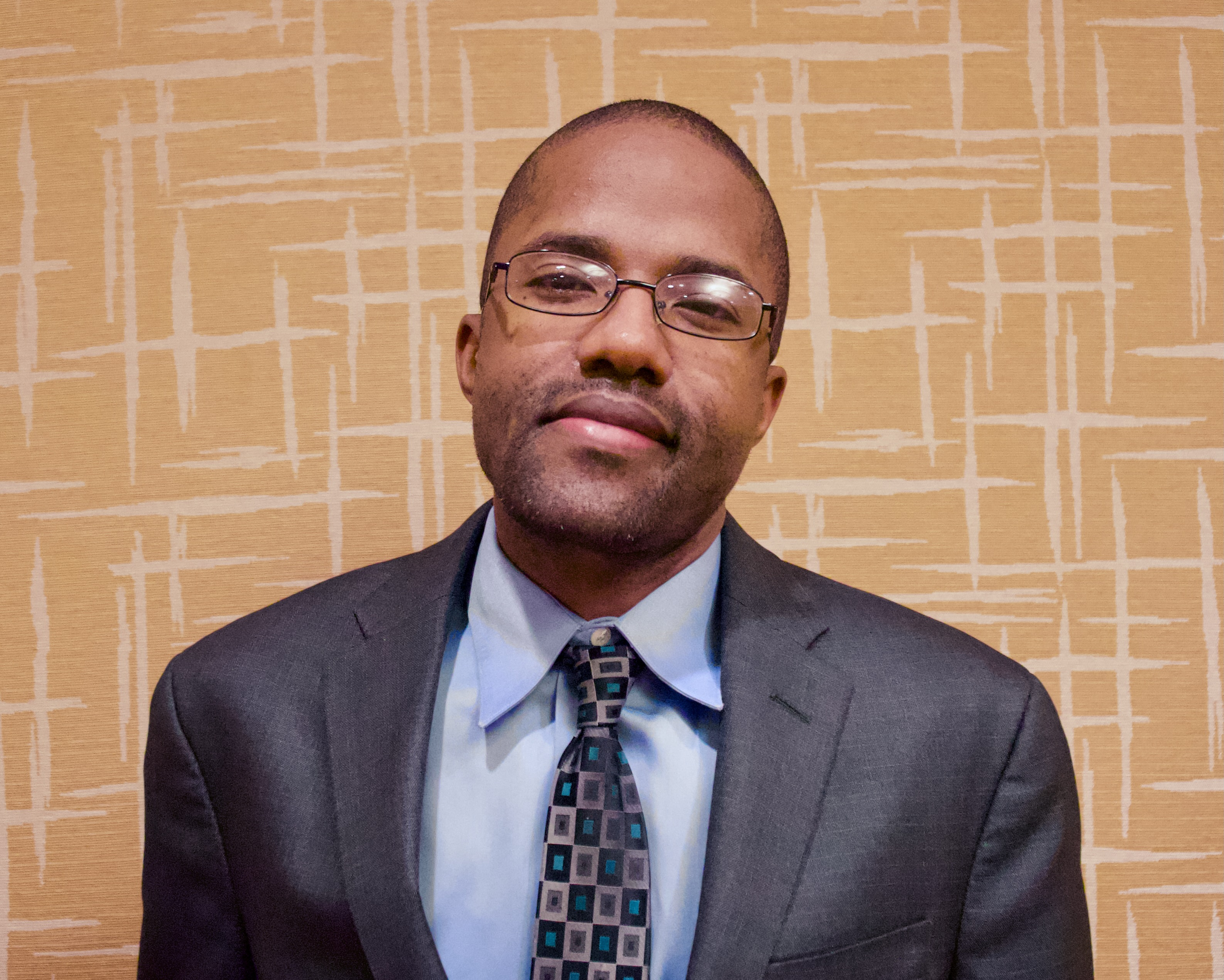
- Born: November 30, 1980 (age 45)
- Education: Duke University; Florida A&M University
- Children: 4
- Scientific career
- Fields: Economics; Finance
- Workplaces: Howard University

Omari Holmes Swinton (born November 30, 1980) is an American economist who is chair of the Economics department at Howard University and a former president of the National Economic Association.

== Biography ==
Swinton is the son of economist David Swinton. He completed his B.S. in Economics at Florida A&M in 2001, and his M.A. and Ph.D. at Duke University in 2003 and 2007 respectively.

== Career ==
Swinton has been on the faculty of Howard University since 2007, and has chaired that Economics Department since 2017. In February 2019, he was interviewed by J.P. Morgan about building wealth. He was president of the National Economic Association (NEA) in 2019. His stated goal for the organization was to encourage minorities to enter the field of economics.

=== Selected research publications ===
- Swinton, Omari H. "The effect of effort grading on learning." Economics of Education Review 29, no. 6 (2010): 1176–1182.
- Price, Gregory N., William Spriggs, and Omari H. Swinton. "The relative returns to graduating from a historically Black college/university: Propensity score matching estimates from the national survey of Black Americans." The Review of Black Political Economy 38, no. 2 (2011): 103–130.
- Sharpe, Rhonda Vonshay, and Omari H. Swinton. "Beyond anecdotes: A quantitative examination of Black women in academe." The Review of Black Political Economy 39, no. 3 (2012): 341–352.
- Hussey, Andrew J., and Omari H. Swinton. "Estimating the ex ante expected returns to college." American Economic Review 101, no. 3 (2011): 598–602.
- Ahn, Tom, Peter Arcidiacono, Alvin Murphy, and Omari Swinton. "Explaining cross-racial differences in teenage labor force participation: Results from a two-sided matching model." Journal of Econometrics 156, no. 1 (2010): 201–211.
