= Margaret Drugovich =

American academic administrator

Margaret L. Drugovich
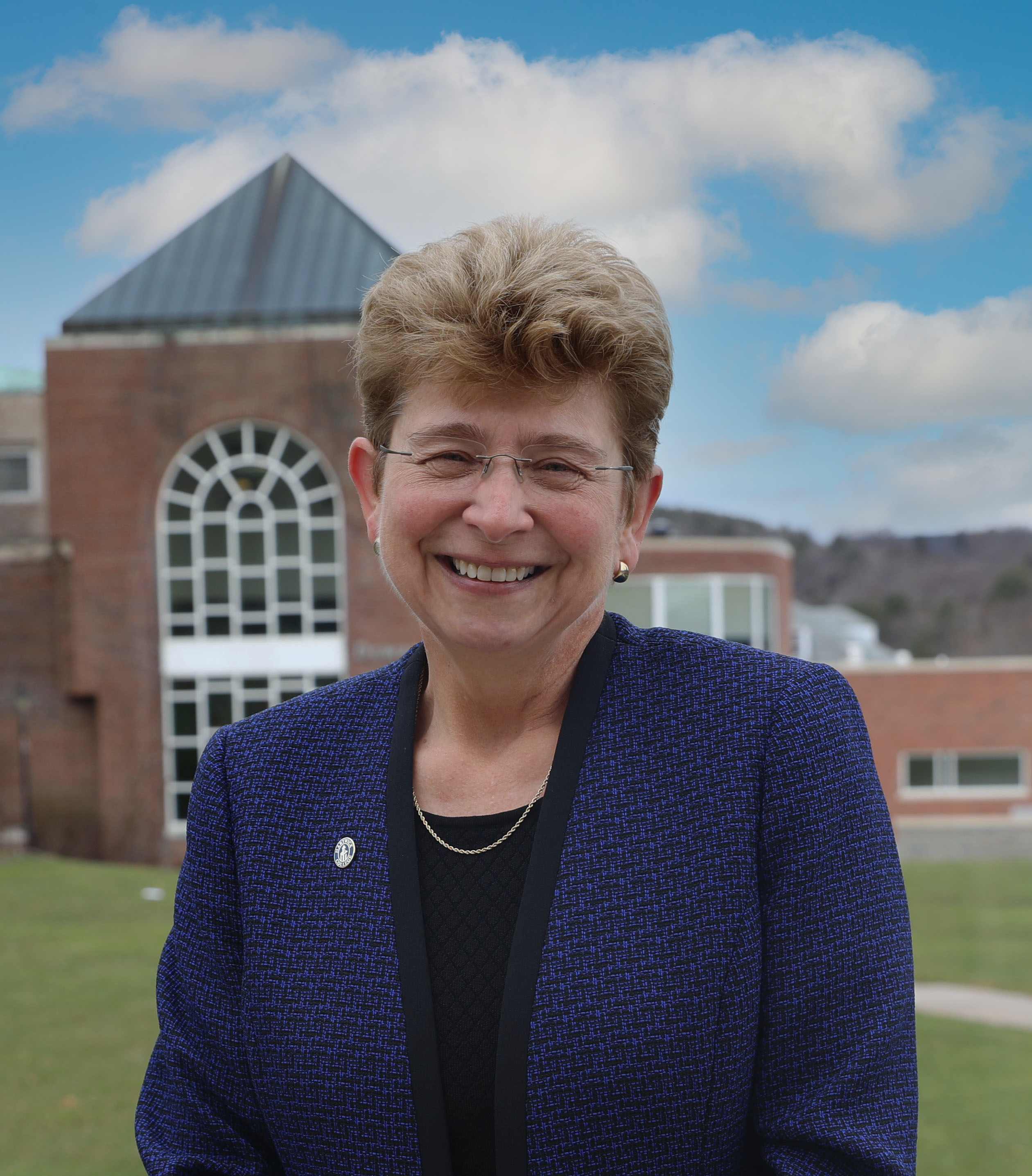

Interim President of Marietta College
- In office July 1, 2023 – December 31, 2024
- Preceded by: William Ruud
- Succeeded by: Kathleen Poorman Dougherty

10th President of Hartwick College
- In office July 2008 – July 2022
- Preceded by: Richard P. Miller Jr.
- Succeeded by: Darren Reisberg

Personal details
- Spouse: Elizabeth Steele (m. 2013)
- Children: 2
- Education: Albertus Magnus College (BS); Brown University (AM); Case Western Reserve University (DM)

Margaret L. Drugovich is an American academic administrator and healthcare policy researcher who most recently served for 18 months as interim president of Marietta College in Marietta, Ohio. She previously served as the 10th president of Hartwick College in Oneonta, New York from 2008 to 2022.

== Early life and education ==
Drugovich grew up on her parents' grape farm in Geneva, Ohio. First in her family to attend college, she studied experimental psychology at Albertus Magnus College and later earned a master's in medical sociology at Brown University. Drugovich completed a Doctor of Management at Case Western Reserve University's Weatherhead School of Management in 2004, where she was a Fellow at the Mandel Center for Nonprofit Organizations and wrote her dissertation on "Converting Highly Legitimized Structural Barriers Into Vehicles Of Change: A Case For Transformational Leadership In Liberal Arts Colleges." In 2015, Albertus Magnus College named Drugovich its Outstanding Alumna of the Year.

== Career ==
Drugovich worked as a healthcare policy researcher at the Brown University Center for Gerontology and Health Care Research. She joined Bryant University as associate director for institutional research, was named executive assistant to the president by William Truehart, and then Bryant's dean of admission and financial aid. In 1998, Drugovich joined Ohio Wesleyan University as vice-president for strategic communication and university enrollment.

=== President of Hartwick College ===
In February 2008, Drugovich was announced as the 10th president of Hartwick College, in Oneonta, New York. She took office on July 1. She developed the Organizing Principle & Strategic Framework that guided college decision-making throughout her tenure. Major planning initiatives followed, including a master facilities plan (2012), the Leadership Group (2013–14), the Hartwick225 Action Plan in anticipation of Hartwick's 225th year (2017–18), the FlightPath Promise (2018–2020) and implementation (2020–2022), and the COVID-responsive Strategic Response Team (2020–2022).

Early priorities of Drugovich's tenure addressed college affordability. In 2009, she launched a three-year program in which students can earn a degree in most majors offered, taking three-quarters the time and at three-quarters the cost. In 2010, fundraising began for The Campaign for Hartwick Students: It's Personal. The initiative raised a record $34.7 million with student scholarships as the principal objective.

Drugovich developed alternative revenue streams to support both the educational enterprise and the New York region. The Hartwick College Center for Craft Food & Beverage was launched in 2014 with support from the Empire State Development Corporation, the Appalachian Regional Commission, the Alden Trust, Brewery Ommegang, and State Senator James Seward. The Center for Craft Food & Beverage (CCFB) supports small brewers across the region and the country with affordable testing services in product quality and improvement. In 2021, Drugovich led collaborations to create a companion community development initiative - the Hartwick College Grain Innovation Center - and make it part of downtown Oneonta's development.

Following college-wide budget cuts in 2016, the Hartwick faculty passed a motion of no confidence in the president that April. The following month, the board of trustees announced she had accepted their offer of a new eight-year contract as president.

In 2013 Drugovich was appointed to the US Senate Bi-partisan Task Force on Government Regulation of Higher Education, chaired by Senator Lamar Alexander. She served as the chair of the American Council on Education (ACE) Women's Network Executive Council, and was a member of the NCAA Division III President's Council and Strategic Planning and Finance Committee. She also served as a member of the board of the National Association of Independent Colleges and Universities (NAICU), and was chair of the executive committee on Accountability. Drugovich was also board treasurer and chair of the Finance and Administrative Committee of the New York Commission on Independent Colleges and Universities (CICU).

Hometown Oneonta and the Freeman's Journal news outlets named Drugovich the 2016 Citizen of the Year. The American Council on Education (ACE) New York State Women’s Network recognized Drugovich with the 2017 Catalyst Award, honoring her as “an outstanding woman leader in the field of higher education.” In 2022, the Hartwick College Alumni Association presented Drugovich with the Meritorious Service Award in recognition of her outstanding loyalty and service to the College.

On September 13, 2021, Drugovich announced that she would step down as president of Hartwick College in the summer of 2022. In recognition of her leadership, the board of trustees designated Drugovich President Emerita of Hartwick College.

=== Interim President of Marietta College ===
On June 2, 2023, the Marietta College Board of Trustees announced their selection of Drugovich to serve as interim president effective July 1, 2023. Initially hired for one year, she agreed to continue in the role through December 31, 2024, and completed an 18-month tenure as the college's 20th president.

As president, Drugovich focused on steps to ensure the college’s financial sustainability, including leadership fundraising; completion of a comprehensive academic program review; and the collaborative development of strategic and operational plans (Marietta Forward and Marietta Now). Additionally, she recruited and hired key senior officers to lead the college forward.

In recognition of her contributions, the Marietta College Board of Trustees awarded Drugovich an honorary Doctor of Humane Letters at its May 2024 Commencement ceremony.

== Personal life ==
Drugovich is openly gay and was one of the first out LGBTQ presidents in higher education in the US. She and her long-term partner, Elizabeth Steele, married in 2013; they have two children together.
