= Carine Feyten =

Carine M. Feyten
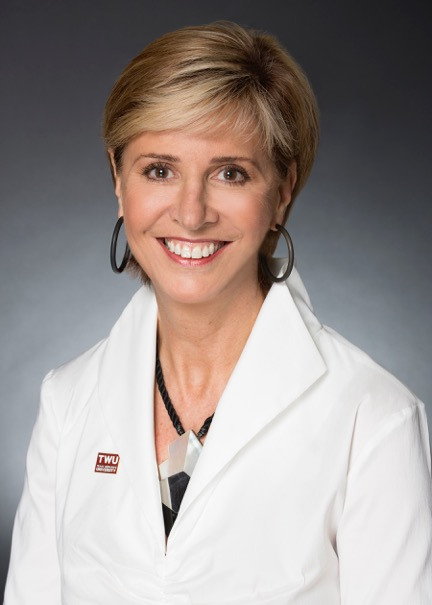
- 2014 Photograph of Carine M. Feyten

11th President and 2nd Chancellor of Texas Woman's University
- Incumbent
- Assumed office July 1, 2014
- Preceded by: Ann Stuart

Personal details
- Born: Mechelen, Belgium
- Spouse: Chad Wick
- Education: University of Louvain (BA, MA); University of South Florida (PhD)
- Website: Office of the Chancellor

Carine M. Feyten is the second chancellor and eleventh president of Texas Woman's University (TWU), which is part of the Texas Woman's University System, established in 2021. The public university system has campuses in Denton, Dallas and Houston. Feyten was selected by the TWU Board of Regents in March 2014 and began her tenure in July of that year. She is the fifth woman to hold the title of president and second to hold the title of chancellor following a series of six male presidents, starting with Cree T. Work in 1901 and ending with John A. Guinn in 1976. In accordance with the servant leadership framework, she leads a university that enrolls about 16,000 students, predominantly women; employs more than 2,800 faculty and staff; runs on an annual operating budget that exceeds $256 million; and provides an annual statewide economic impact of more than $1.8 billion.

== Career ==
Prior to moving to the United States, Feyten earned a BA in Germanic Philology and MA in English, Dutch, and Education, both from University of Louvain (UCLouvain). She went on to earn a PhD in Second Language Acquisition from the University of South Florida. She stayed on as faculty at USF, and concluded her 23-year tenure there in 2006. Prior to taking her current role at TWU, she served as the dean of the College of Education, Health, and Society at Miami (OH) University. She has co-authored more than 100 journal articles, conference papers, and book chapters. She says, "I've always been fascinated with language—communication across linguistic, ethnic, and cultural boundaries." She speaks five living languages (Flemish/Dutch, French, German, English, and Spanish) and two dead languages (Latin and classical Greek).

Board and committee memberships

Feyten sits or has served on the following public and private boards:

- International Women’s Forum, Dallas — Board of Directors, 2021
- Dallas Thrives — Board, 2020–present
- HERS: Higher Education Resource Services — Board of Directors, 2020–present
- American Association of Colleges for Teacher Education — Board of Directors, 2018–present
- Federal Reserve Bank of Dallas Business and Community Advisory Council — Advisory Council, 2018–present
- Women’s College Coalition — Board of Directors, 2016 – 2020
- Dallas Arboretum and Botanical Garden CEO Advisory Council — Advisory Council, 2018–present
- Dallas Regional Chamber — Board Class, 2018
- Dallas Regional Chamber — UCEOs, president 2019
- KERA (North Texas public radio/television) — Board of Directors, 2016–present
- Lone Star Conference’s Council of Presidents — Chair of the Executive Committee, 2017 - 2018
- Council of Public University Presidents and Chancellors — Board Secretary/Treasurer, 2016 - 2019
- Denton Economic Development Partnership — Board, 2016–present
- Texas International Education Consortium — Executive Committee, 2015 – 2020
- Texas Medical Center: Women’s Leadership Council — Board, 2015 - 2017

== Personal life ==
Carine M. Feyten grew up in a Flemish town in Belgium speaking both French and Flemish. She later attended an all-girls boarding school near Tournai, Belgium. She is the oldest and tallest member of her family. She has a son and lives with her husband Chad Wick in the University House on the Texas Woman's Denton campus.
