= Jolene Koester =

American academic administrator (born 1948)

Chancellor of the California State University
- Interim
- In office May 1, 2022 – October 1, 2023
- Preceded by: Steve Relyea (acting); Joseph I. Castro
- Succeeded by: Mildred García

4th President of California State University, Northridge
- In office July 1, 2000 – December 2011
- Preceded by: Blenda Wilson
- Succeeded by: Dianne F. Harrison

Personal details
- Born: 1948 (age 77–78) Plato, Minnesota, U.S.
- Education: University of Minnesota (BA, PhD); University of Wisconsin, Madison (MA)

Academic background
- Thesis: Rhetorical visions of female managers in popular self-help books (1980)

Academic work
- Discipline: Speech communication
- Sub-discipline: California State University, Sacramento; California State University, Northridge

Jolene Koester (born 1948) is an American university administrator, economic board member, and author. She served as the 4th president of California State University, Northridge from July 2000 to December 2011, and as the interim Chancellor of the California State University system from 2022 to 2023. Koester holds a Ph.D. in speech communication.

== Early life and education ==
Born in 1948 in Plato, Minnesota, Koester is the daughter of an auto mechanic who never finished high school. She earned a Bachelor of Arts from the University of Minnesota in 1970, a Master of Arts in communication arts from the University of Wisconsin–Madison in 1971, and a PhD in speech communication from Minnesota in 1980.

== Academic career ==
Koester began her academic career as a professor of communication studies at California State University, Sacramento in 1980. She held various executive positions in the academic affairs division at Sacramento State prior to her appointment as provost and vice president for Academic Affairs in 1993. Koester was appointed president of California State University, Northridge in 2000.

At the beginning of her presidency at Northridge, Koester identified several goals to serve as the focus of the campus' efforts. These include improving graduation rates, creating a user-friendly campus, strengthening the University's connections to the community, and increasing fundraising. In spring 2006, CSU Chancellor Charles B. Reed and the Board of Trustees completed its second three-year performance evaluation of President Koester. The public summary concluded that Dr. Koester "continues to deliver an outstanding performance as president of a very large urban university."

Koester announced her retirement from CSUN at the end of 2011. She was appointed as the interim Chancellor of the California State University system beginning in May 2022. She retired from her role as Interim Chancellor in the fall of 2023.

== Impact ==
Koester was responsible for closing down the CSUN football program at the end of 2001. She also oversaw several major building projects on the campus during her tenure, including the $125 million Valley Performing Arts Center.

== Community service ==
As an active member of the community, Koester served on the boards of directors for the Los Angeles Chamber of Commerce, the Economic Alliance of the San Fernando Valley, the Valley Industry and Commerce Association, and the Southern California Biomedical Council. She also was a board member of the Los Angeles World Affairs Council and the Los Angeles Jobs and Economy Committee. Known nationally for her leadership in the area of higher education, she served on the Board of Directors for the American Association of State Colleges and Universities and the American Council on Education's Commission on Women in Higher Education. Koester served as chair of the American Association of State Colleges and Universities in 2008–09.

In 2008, Koester presided over CSUN's celebration of its 50th anniversary as the only public university located in Los Angeles' San Fernando Valley, home to about 1.8 million residents.

== Publications ==
Koester published several books with Myron W. Lustig during her career, including:

- AmongUs: Essays on Identity, Belonging, and Intercultural Competence (Longman, 2000)
- Intercultural Competence: Interpersonal Communication Across Cultures (Longman, 2012)
