= Dominican Academy =

Location
- 44 East 68th Street (Upper East Side, Manhattan); New York City, New York 10065; United States; 40°46′8″N 73°58′.5″W

Information
- Type: Private, all-female
- Motto: Veritas (Truth)
- Religious affiliation: Roman Catholic
- Established: 1897 (129 years ago)
- President: Alexandria M. Egler
- Principal: Leslie Petit
- Faculty: 26
- Grades: 9–12
- Enrollment: 230
  - Grade 9: 70
- Colors: Blue, white and gold
- Athletics: Basketball, cross-country track, soccer, softball, swimming, tennis, indoor and outdoor track, and volleyball
- Mascot: Dominic the Tiger
- Accreditation: Middle States Association of Colleges and Schools, New York State Association of Independent Schools (NYSAIS)
- Publication: Veritas (alumnae magazine)
- Newspaper: Student Prints
- Yearbook: The Dominican
- School fees: $750
- Tuition: $23,600
- Website: dominicanacademy.org

Dominican Academy is a Catholic college preparatory school for girls located on the Upper East Side of the Manhattan borough of New York City. It was founded by the Dominican Sisters of St. Mary of the Springs (now Dominican Sisters of Peace).

== Accreditation and awards ==
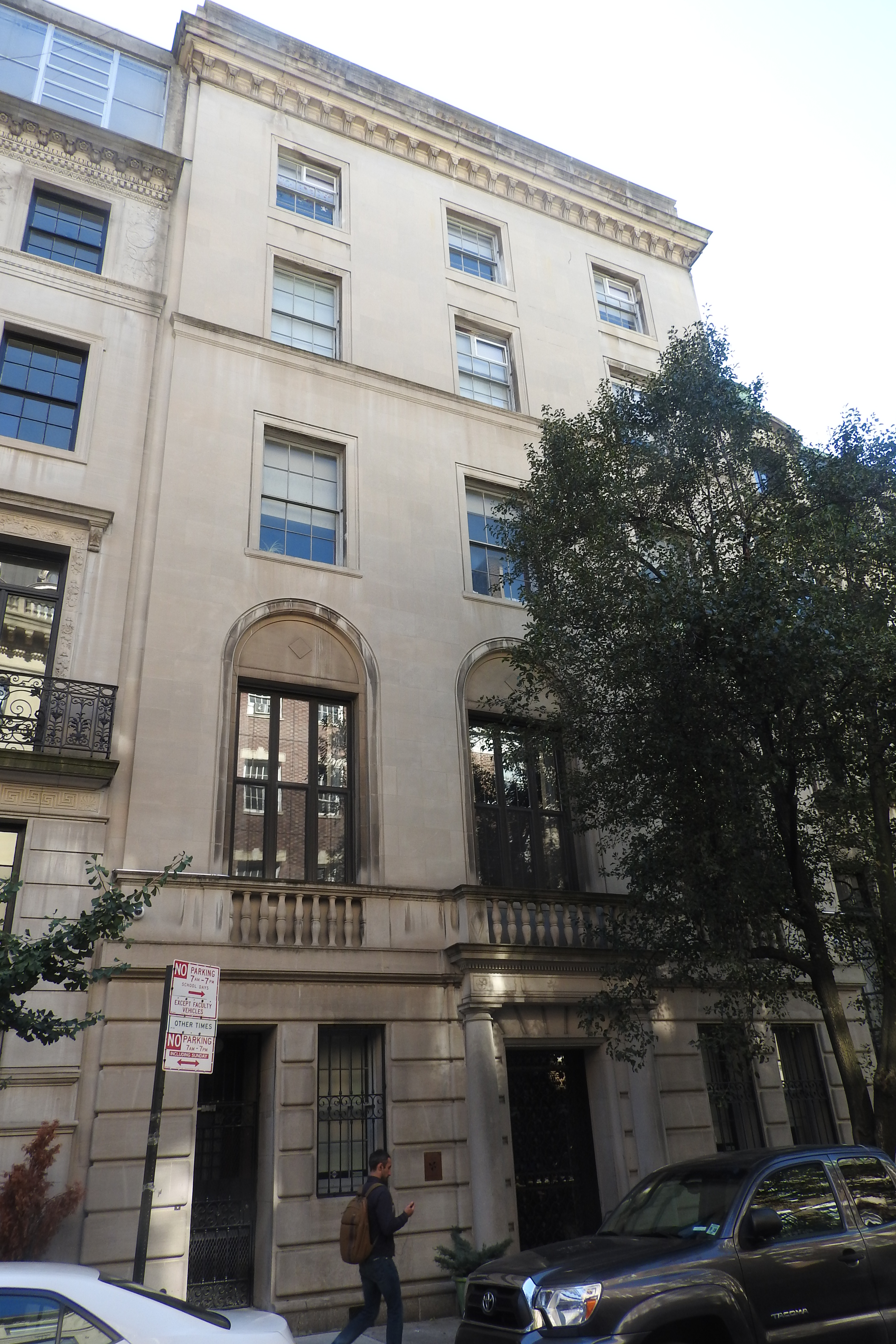
Main school building at 44 East 68 Street

The school is accredited by the New York State Association of Independent Schools (NYSAIS), the Middle States Association of Colleges and Schools, the Board of Regents of the University of the State of New York, and has been recognized twice with the National Blue Ribbon Schools Program Award of Excellence by the United States Department of Education, the highest award an American school can receive.

== Notable alumnae ==
- Margaret Heckler
- Sunny Hostin
- Makenzie Vega
- Willow Bay
