= Dianne F. Harrison =

American academic administrator

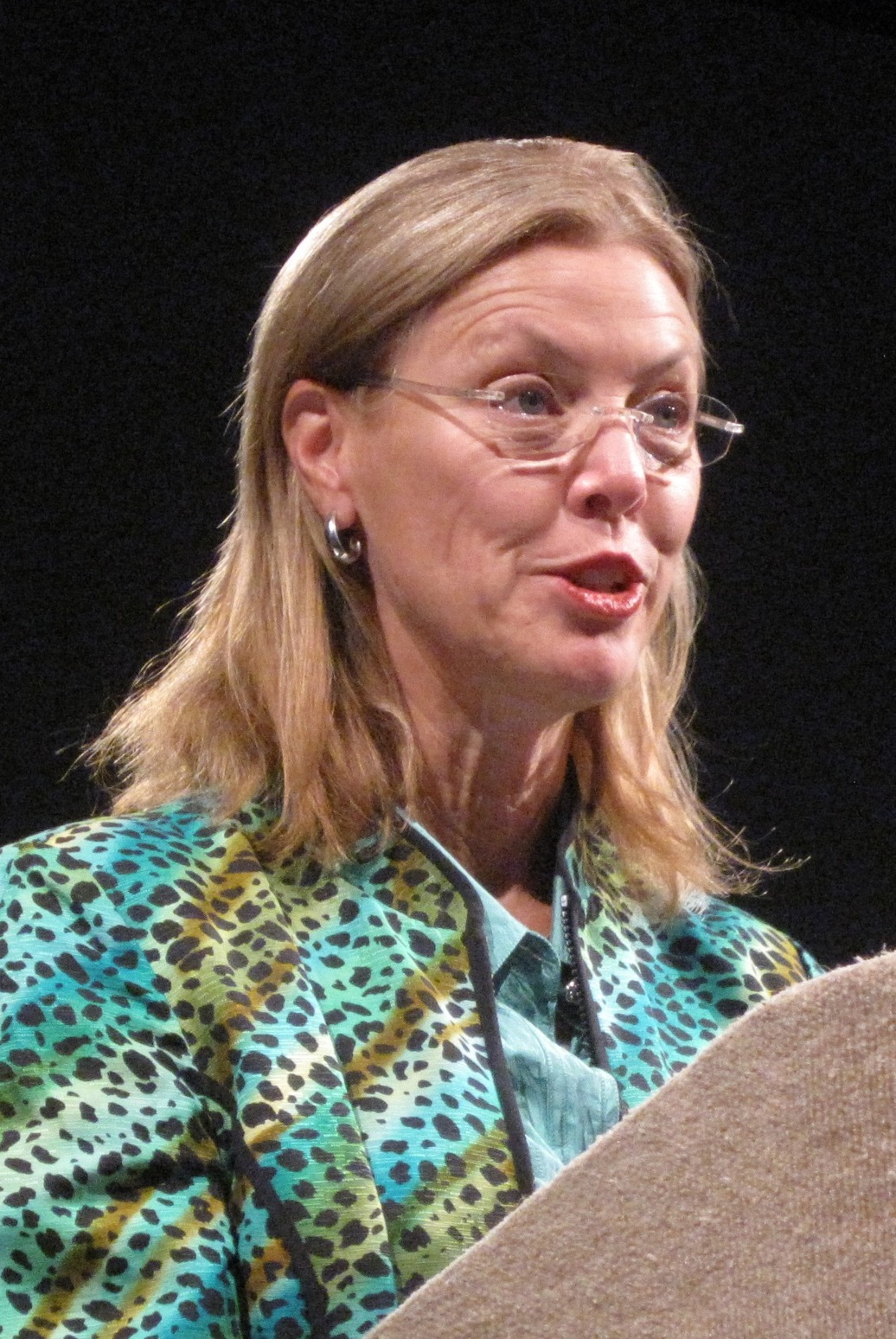
- Harrison in 2009

5th President of California State University, Northridge
- In office June 2012 – January 2021
- Preceded by: Jolene Koester
- Succeeded by: Erika D. Beck

3rd President of California State University, Monterey Bay
- In office 2006 – 2012
- Preceded by: Diane Cordero de Noriega (interim)
- Succeeded by: Eduardo M. Ochoa

Personal details
- Education: University of Alabama (BA, MSW); Washington University in St. Louis (PhD)
- Profession: College administrator, Social worker

Academic background
- Thesis: A comparison of reciprocity counseling and communication training in the treatment of marital discord (1976)
- Doctoral advisor: William Butterfield

Academic work
- Discipline: Social work
- Institutions: Florida State University; California State University, Monterey Bay; California State University, Northridge

Dianne F. Harrison is a retired American university administrator and former social worker. She was the president of California State University, Monterey Bay from 2006 through 2012. In June 2012, she became the fifth president of California State University, Northridge, where she retired in January 2021. Previously, she worked for thirty years at Florida State University.

== Education ==
Harrison earned a bachelor's in American studies from University of Alabama where she also completed a Master's in Social Work. She went on to complete her doctorate in social work from Washington University in St. Louis.

== Career ==
Harrison worked at Florida State University (FSU) in a variety of positions including as a faculty member, dean of social work, and the associate vice president for academic affairs. She was later the Dean of the FSU Graduate School and vice president for academic quality and external programs. In 2006, Harrison was appointed as the president of California State University, Monterey Bay.

In June 2012, Harrison became the fifth president of California State University, Northridge (CSUN) in June 2012. Harrison experienced a variety of successes and setbacks during her 8-year tenure at CSUN. Graduation rates increased, Title IX complaints decreased, budgets were balanced, and philanthropic giving went up. During the same time period, protests on campus against the implementation of a California State University Chancellor's Office Executive Order on ethnic studies led to a CSUN faculty senate vote of no confidence against Harrison in 2018, which ultimately failed. In 2019, a student group known as the Students of Color Coalition sent Harrison a list of grievances which included the demand to change the name of the Delmar T. Oviatt Library at CSUN, due to alleged racism grounded in events from the late 1960s. Harrison responded by appointing an advisory group which studied the issue and found that some of the students' allegations were accurate. The committee recommended that the name be changed, and Harrison agreed. Later, Black Lives Matter protests in Northridge during the summer of 2020 led to calls for defunding the police at CSUN, which Harrison rejected as impractical. Harrison originally intended to retire as president of CSUN effective June 30, 2020. However, because of the COVID-19 pandemic, she announced her retirement would be delayed in order to provide experienced guidance for CSUN. Harrison retired from CSUN in January 2021.

== Personal life ==
Harrison is married to John Wujack.

== Publications ==
- "Are professional guidelines needed regarding the appropriate use of research in practice?" In Controversial issues in social work research, Boston: Allyn and Bacon, 1994.
- Cultural diversity and social work practice. Springfield, Illinois: C.C. Thomas, 1996.
- Finding an academic job. (co-authored with Karen M. Sowers-Hoag). Thousand Oaks, California: Sage Publications, 1998.
- "Disseminating research findings." In The handbook of social work research methods. Thousand Oaks, California: Sage Publications, 2001.
- "Levels of crises and leadership responses: role differentiation and collaboration." In Managing the unthinkable: crisis preparation and response for campus leaders. Sterling, Virginia: Stylus, 2014.
- "The Role of Higher Education in the Changing World of Work." In EDUCAUSE Review. Volume 52, Number 6, October 23, 2017.
