= Robin E. Bowen =

American academic

Former President of Arkansas Tech University
- Incumbent
- Assumed office July 2013 - September 2023
- Succeeded by: Russell Jones

Personal details
- Education: Texas Tech University Doctorate of Education in Higher Education (Administration); University of Arkansas Master of Education in Rehabilitation Counseling; University of Kansas Bachelor of Science in Occupational Therapy

Robin E. Bowen (née Hayes) is an American academic who served as president of Arkansas Tech University from 2014 to 2023.

Bowen grew up in Carl Junction, Missouri, the daughter of Judy and Eugene Hayes. Her father operated a service station, but after he was disabled by lead poisoning the family was forced to rely on her mother's teaching job for income. Bowen attended Carl Junction High School, and then went on to complete a B.Sc. at the University of Kansas (in occupational therapy) and a M.Sc. at the University of Arkansas (in rehabilitation counseling). After a number of years as a lecturer, she returned to school to complete a D.Ed. at Texas Tech University, writing a thesis on women in college administration.

After completing her doctorate, Bowen took up a position at Rockhurst University, Missouri, becoming dean of the School of Graduate and Professional Studies. She was later vice president for academic affairs at Washburn University and interim provost at Donnelly College, both in Kansas. In 2011, Bowen was appointed vice-president for academic affairs at Fitchburg State University, Massachusetts. She was elevated to provost and executive vice-president in 2013. In April 2014, Bowen was elected president of Arkansas Tech by the university board of trustees. She began her term on July 1, becoming the first female president of a public four-year university in Arkansas.

On September 9, 2023, the Arkansas Tech Board of Trustees voted unanimously to fire Bowen and appoint Russell Jones as interim president. Dr. Bowen had been on medical leave since July 7 and was recovering from surgery.

== See also ==
- List of women presidents or chancellors of co-ed colleges and universities
