= Ellen Junn =

11th President of the California State University, Stanislaus
- Incumbent
- Assumed office July 2016

Personal details
- Born: Ellen Nan Junn Champaign, Illinois, U.S.
- Children: 1
- Education: University of Michigan (BS); Princeton University (MS, PhD)

Academic background
- Thesis: Developments in children's problem-solving procedures from two to five: evidence for the development of inductive strategy in an object manipulation task (reasoning, preschoolers, nonverbal) (1984)
- Doctoral advisor: Susan Sugarman

Academic work
- Discipline: Psychology
- Institutions: California State University, San Bernardino; California State University, Dominguez Hills; California State University, San Jose; California State University, Fresno; California State University, Fullerton

Ellen Nan Junn is an American academic administrator. In July 2016, she became the 11th president of California State University, Stanislaus. She is the first Korean-American woman president appointed in the U.S. to a four-year public institution.

== Early life and education ==
Junn was born in Champaign, Illinois, the daughter of immigrants from Korea. She was raised in Jenison, Michigan.

Junn earned a bachelor's degree in experimental and cognitive psychology from the University of Michigan. She earned a master's degree and PhD in cognitive and developmental psychology from Princeton University. In addition, she holds a management development program certificate from Harvard University, and CSU-Knight Collaborative program certificate from Wharton School of the University of Pennsylvania Institute for Research in Higher Education.

== Career ==
Junn has worked at California State University for 33 years, working at five other CSU campuses prior to joining Stanislaus. She began her career as an assistant psychology professor at California State University, San Bernardino. She has also taught and held leadership positions at the Dominguez Hills, San Jose State, Fresno and Fullerton campuses. She has led initiatives such as the African American Student Success and Hispanic Student Success task force at San Jose State and the Women’s Campus Connection and the Asian Faculty and Staff Association at California State Fresno.

Junn is widely published and has peer-reviewed research and journal articles. She also has numerous community leadership roles and has worked as an academic professor.

== Personal life ==
Junn is married to Allan Greenberg, with whom she has one son.
