= Roslyn Artis =

American academic administrator

Roslyn Clark Artis
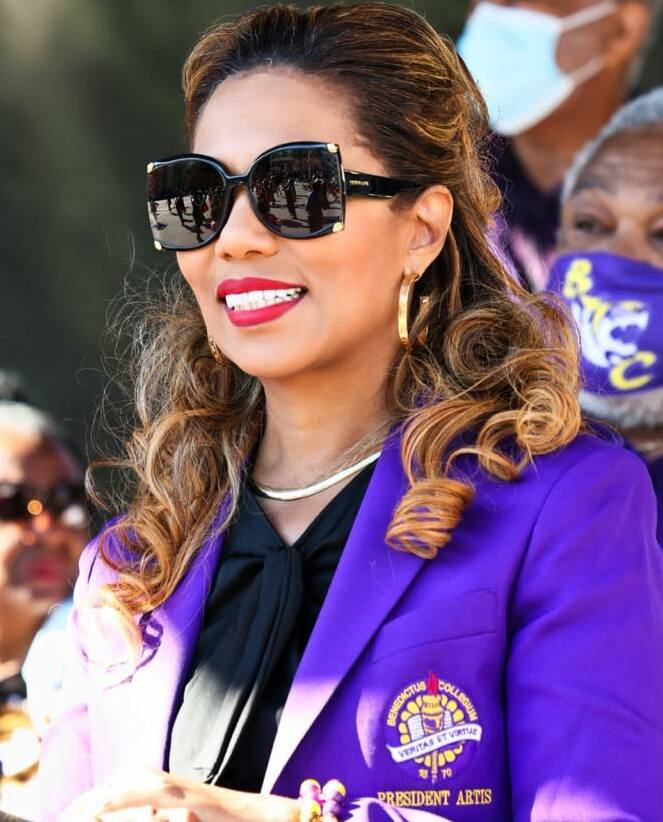

President of Benedict College
- Incumbent
- Assumed office September 1, 2017
- Preceded by: David Swinton

President of Florida Memorial University
- In office 2013 – September 1, 2017

Provost of Mountain State University
- In office 2011–2013

Personal details
- Born: June 16, 1970 (age 56) Springfield, Massachusetts, U.S.
- Education: West Virginia State University (BA); West Virginia University College of Law (JD); Vanderbilt University
- Occupation: Academic administrator; lawyer

Roslyn Clark Artis (born June 16, 1970) is the 14th president of Benedict College and the first woman to hold the position. She holds the additional distinction of being the first female president of Florida Memorial University. She is also educational advisor to the U.S. Secretary of Homeland Security, serves on the board of directors of the United Negro College Fund and the Council of Independent Colleges, and serves as co-chair for the United Way of the Midlands Campaign.

== Early life ==
Artis was born in Springfield, Massachusetts to Robert M. Clark and Christine E. Clark and was raised in southern West Virginia. She graduated from Woodrow Wilson High School (Beckley, West Virginia) in 1988.

== Education ==
Artis received a scholarship to attend West Virginia State University, earning a B.A. in Political Science in 1991. She then earned her Juris Doctor from West Virginia University College of Law and her doctorate in Higher Education Leadership and Policy from Vanderbilt University. She holds a Certificate of Fundraising Management from Indiana University and a Certificate of Mastery in Prior Learning Assessment from DePaul University.

== Career ==
Artis practiced law for ten years with the firms Brown & Levicoff PLLC and The Wooton Law Firm. When a friend asked her to teach courses as an adjunct professor, Artis acquiesced despite lack of experience in education. She found her passion in the field and returned to school to earn a doctorate so as to pursue the path in-depth and full-time. Leaving behind six years part-time classroom teaching, Artis graduated to the position of director of Mountain State University's legal studies program. Next, she served as Senior Academic Officer for Distance Education, a post in which she oversaw the university's independent study and online programs. She also managed the school's Orlando, Florida and Center Township, Pennsylvania campuses.

Artis was named chief academic officer at Mountain State University in September 2010, a post in which she was responsible for "all curricular and programmatic academic decisions regardless of the campus or modality." Artis was serving as provost at Mountain State University in 2012, a position she began in 2011, when the university lost its accreditation. The following year, Artis transitioned to the position of president of Florida Memorial College. There, she oversaw the implementation of new technology, construction of new facilities, and resource development in STEM, cybersecurity, and social justice.

In 2017, Artis assumed the position of president at Benedict College, where she lowered tuition by 26% and launched the HBCU Sustainability Summit.

In 2020, Artis helped open Benedict College's Women’s Business Center, making the college one of only two historically black universities in the United States to house a business center dedicated to advancing women in business.

== Personal life ==
Artis is married to Selby Artis, a retired United States Army officer, businessman, and contractor with the United States Department of Agriculture. The couple has three children, Christopher, Jayden, and Jocelyn.

== Controversies ==
In 2017, while applying for the position of President at Jackson State University, several noteworthy past incidents came to light:

- During her tenure at the now defunct Mountain State University, Artis, along with many other school leaders, were sued in 2010 for allegedly attempting to cover-up the school's accreditation issues and ultimately firing one professor without cause after said professor told her nursing students about the issues. A Federal complaint made by a student at the time alleged that Artis was in the room but stood by and watched as students were told that if the sought legal help, they wouldn't graduate.
- During her tenure as interim, and later, President of Florida Memorial University, Artis reduced the University's budget deficit from $3 million to $1 million, by freezing salaries, firing roughly a dozen employees including two Vice Presidents, and the temporary suspension of matching 401(k) contributions

In 2019, during her current tenure as President of Benedict College, the school was placed on Probation with Good Cause by the accreditation board SACSCOC after struggling to overcome years of financial instability (prior to Artis' arrival) and failing to meet its requirements on financial responsibility. The school was released from Probation and restored to good standing a year later.

== Awards and recognition ==
- In 2020, Artis was named “President of the Year” by Higher Ed Dive for her leadership in navigating the unprecedented challenges of 2020
- In 2019, Artis was named to Diverse Issues in Higher Education’s “Top 35 Leading Women in Higher Education”
- In 2019, 100 Black Men of America, Inc. named Artis "2021 Educator of the Year”
- In 2018, HBCU Digest named Artis “Female HBCU President of the Year”
- In 2018, the South Carolina State Senate honored Artis for her "significant contributions as the first female president of two collegiate institutions in the United States."
- In 2008, the West Virginia Department of Education honored Artis for her contributions to human and civil rights and scholarship.
- In 2000, the United States Congressional Black Caucus recognized Artis as “A Leader in the Making."
- In 1999, President Bill Clinton named Artis one of “1,000 Points of Light” in communities across the country for public service.

== Media appearances ==
Date	Outlet	Format	Role
March 18, 2020	The Breakfast Club	Radio/YouTube video	self
Nov. 12, 2019	Sister Circle	Radio/YouTube video	self
May 15, 2018	Pecan Pie	YouTube series	self
