= Regina Stanback Stroud =

American educator

Chancellor of Peralta Community College District
- Incumbent
- Assumed office October 21, 2019
- Preceded by: Frances White (interim)

Personal details
- Born: 1957 (age 68–69) Camp Lejeune, North Carolina, U.S.
- Spouse: Linda Collins
- Education: Howard University (BS in Nursing); Golden Gate University (MA in Human Relations); Mills College (MA, EdD in Educational Leadership)
- Profession: Academic

Academic background
- Thesis: Theorizing African American women's leadership in predominantly white institutions of higher education (2009)
- Doctoral advisor: Sabrina Zirkel

Academic work
- Institutions: Skyline Community College Mission College Santa Ana College

Regina Stanback Stroud (born 1957) is an American educator who served as the Chancellor of the Peralta Community College District based in Oakland California.

== Career ==
She previously served as President of Skyline College (2011–2019), Vice President of Instruction at Skyline College (2001–2011), Dean of Workforce and Economic Development of Mission College in Santa Clara (1997–2001).

In addition to her academic administrative roles, she has been a professor of nursing at Santa Ana College, a visiting professor of educational leadership at Mills College, and as an adjunct professor of educational leadership at San Francisco State University. Her academic work has centered around the intersection of critical race theory, black feminist thought, and women's leadership. Her research interests include student equity and diversity, education/industry collaboratives, anti-poverty strategies and community workforce and economic development.

== Public Service and Philanthropy ==
She was appointed by President Barack Obama to the President's Advisory Council on Financial Capability for Young Americans. The Council published its findings in 2015

She has as a board member of various organizations, including the San Bruno Community Foundation, the San Mateo Community College Foundation, the Peralta Community College District Foundation, the United Way of the Bay Area, Base11, MaxGrad and Sierra Nevada Journeys.

== Personal life ==
She lives in Oakland California with her wife, Linda Collins.
