= Juliet V. García =

American academic administrator

Juliet García
- García being awarded the Presidential Medal of Freedom in 2022

Personal details
- Born: Juliet Villarreal García; 1949 (age 76–77) Brownsville, Texas, U.S.
- Education: Texas State University, San Marcos; University of Houston (BA, MA); University of Texas, Austin (PhD)
- Awards: Presidential Medal of Freedom (2022)

Juliet Villarreal García (born 1949) is an American academic administrator. When she was named president of Texas Southmost College (TSC) in 1986, she became the first Mexican-American female to head a U.S. college or university. After TSC merged with a four-year university in 1991, she served as president of the resulting University of Texas at Brownsville and Texas Southmost College (UTB-TSC), then was president of the University of Texas at Brownsville when it became a separate institution.

With the merger of UTB and the University of Texas Pan American (UTPA) in 2014, García did not apply for the presidency of the newly created school. Instead she became the executive director of the new University of Texas Institute of the Americas. In March 2016, García was named a senior advisor to the chancellor of the University of Texas System.

== Biography ==
García was born in Brownsville, Texas. She was the middle of three children. Her father was from Mexico and worked as a janitor and then customs representative for Pan American World Airways; her mother died when she was a child. García attended Brownsville public schools. García studied at TSC and Southwest Texas State University, then earned bachelor's and master's degrees from the University of Houston.

She joined the TSC faculty in 1972, taking a leave of absence two years later to complete a Ph.D. at the University of Texas at Austin. García was shortlisted for the TSC presidency in 1980. The next year, she was named a dean at the school. García was appointed president of TSC in 1986. With that appointment, she became the first Mexican-American woman to serve as a U.S. college or university president. In 1991, she became president of UTB-TSC, when the community college and four-year university merged their resources.

In 2011, TSC and UTB agreed to begin planning for a separation into distinct institutions. García remained president of UTB, while Lily Tercero was hired as president of TSC. In 2014, with the impending merger of UTB and UTPA into the new University of Texas Rio Grande Valley, García announced that she would not apply for the new school's presidency and would instead become the director of a new center, the University of Texas Institute of the Americas. By March 2016, the University of Texas System had decided to move away from an Americas Institute housed at a single center, and García was named a senior advisor to the system chancellor on matters of community, national and global engagement.

García has served on the boards of trustees for the Ford Foundation and the Robert Wood Johnson Foundation. García was inducted into the Texas Women's Hall of Fame in 2000. She was a 2007 recipient of the Distinguished Alumnus Award from the University of Texas at Austin. She was named one of the ten top college presidents by Time in 2009. In 2014, she was named to Fortune magazine's World's 50 Greatest Leaders. She was the commencement speaker and an honorary degree recipient at Smith College in 2015. In 2022, García was announced as one of seventeen recipients of the Presidential Medal of Freedom.
