= Dominican Sisters of Peace =

The Dominican Sisters of Peace is a congregation of Dominican Sisters of apostolic life, founded on Easter Sunday, April 12, 2009, from the union of seven former Dominican foundations. With general offices in Columbus, Ohio, the congregation holds legal incorporation in the state of Kentucky, home of the founding community of earliest historical origin. In 2012, following a vote by their General Chapter, the Dominican sisters of Catherine de' Ricci became the eighth foundation to join the Dominican Sisters of Peace.

- 1822: Dominicans of St. Catharine, founded in Washington County, (later St. Catharine), Kentucky
- 1830: Dominican Sisters of St. Mary of the Springs, founded in Somerset, Ohio; moved to Columbus, Ohio 1868
- 1860: Congregation of St. Mary, founded in New Orleans, Louisiana
- 1880: Dominican Sisters of St. Catherine de' Ricci, founded in Albany, New York (later moved to Elkins Park, Pennsylvania)
- 1902: Dominican Sisters of Great Bend, Kansas, founded in Great Bend, Kansas
- 1927: Eucharistic Missionaries of St. Dominic, founded in New Orleans, Louisiana, as the Missionary Servants of the Most Holy Eucharist; incorporated into the Dominican Order in 1956 as the Eucharistic Missionaries of St. Dominic.
- 1929: Sisters of St. Dominic of the Immaculate Heart of Mary, founded in Akron, Ohio
- 1950: Congregation of St. Rose of Lima, founded in Oxford, Michigan.

The process by which the original seven Dominican communities came together to form a new religious institute, a pontifical canonical union with formal recognition by the Vatican, is known as reconfiguration. As demographics changed following the cultural movements of the late 20th century, the seven congregations determined to collaborate in this manner so that their mission could be most effectively realized. All shared the Dominican charism and found support for this new endeavor in Perfectae Caritatis, one of the documents issued by the Second Vatican Council: "Independent institutes and monasteries should, when opportune and the Holy See permits, form federations if they can be considered as belonging to the same religious family. Others who have practically identical constitutions and rules and a common spirit should unite, particularly when they have too few members. Finally, those who share the same or a very similar active apostolate should become associated, one to the other." The deliberations that led to the merger took place over a period of seven years, culminating in the inaugural General Chapter of April 15–21, 2009. The first Leadership Team of the new congregation was elected during that General Chapter. At the time of the foundation of the new religious institute, the Dominican Sisters of Peace numbered more than 650 members, with more than 500 associates. As of 2017, the community has 510 members, and over 600 lay associates.

== Leadership ==
The current Leadership Team, which is elected by the Sisters, is composed of the Prioress, Sister Pat Twohill, OP and four Councilors who are elected to a term of six years: Sister Gene Poore, OP; Sister Therese Leckert, OP; Sister Anne Lythgoe, OP; and Sister Gemma Doll, OP.

== Charism and Mission ==
As members of the religious order officially called the Order of Preachers, but commonly known as the Dominican Order, the Dominican Sisters of Peace belong to a religious family within the Roman Catholic Church that was founded in the 13th Century by Saint Dominic to live a common life in pursuit of the Four Pillars of Dominican Life. These Four Pillars are community life, common prayer, study, and service and these four pillars are collectively known as the pattern of life named "holy preaching" by Saint Dominic. The charism and mission of the new congregation are most fully developed in the Constitutions that received formal approval from the Congregation for Institutes of Consecrated Life and Societies of Apostolic Life of the Vatican on March 2, 2010. In that document, Dominican Sisters of Peace affirm their identity as "a religious institute of Dominican women called to preach the liberating truth of the Word of God," and dedicated to a life that integrates "contemplation, study, common life, and ministry." Through their pursuit of truth and justice, they commit themselves to be "a prophetic voice in solidarity with the poor, the marginalized, and the oppressed, and to work for human rights."

== Founded Ministries ==
Perhaps the Dominican Sisters of Peace are most notable for the many institutions and ministries its founding congregations have established through the years. Over their histories, the eight congregations had established sponsored ministries in education, health care, eco-spirituality, retreats, housing, and missions outside the US. As Dominican Sisters of Peace, the Sisters and Associates are in a position to promote these ministries more efficiently.

=== Education ===
As early as the nineteenth century, three of the founding congregations had established academies for the education of children and young women: St. Catharine's Academy, Kentucky 1822; St. Mary's Academy, Somerset, Ohio, 1830; St. Agnes Academy, Memphis, Tennessee 1851, (founded by sisters from Kentucky and Ohio); and St. Mary's, New Orleans, 1860. As parochial schools developed following the Plenary Councils of Baltimore of 1852, 1866, and 1884, most of the congregations responded to the requests from bishops and pastors to provide Sisters to staff these schools. Over the years as needs arose, additional high schools and colleges were founded. Later, meeting the needs of the time, this ministry expanded to include preschools, early childhood centers, and adult literacy centers.

Many educational institutions established by the founding congregations of the Dominican Sisters of Peace are still in operation today. Colleges include Albertus Magnus College, New Haven, Connecticut; Ohio Dominican University, Columbus, Ohio; and St. Catharine College, St. Catharine, Kentucky. High schools and grade schools include Dominican Academy, New York City; Our Lady of the Elms High School and Grade School, Akron, Ohio; St. Agnes Academy-St. Dominic School, Memphis, Tennessee; and St. Mary's Dominican High School, New Orleans, Louisiana. Adult learning centers include Dominican Learning Center, Columbus, Ohio; Siena Learning Center, New Britain, Connecticut; and Springs Learning Center, New Haven, Connecticut.

=== Health Care ===
Health Care has been one of the consistently held ministries among the founding congregations. During their first 50 years, Dominican Sisters from Great Bend opened three hospitals in Kansas: St. Rose Hospital,(Great Bend, 1903); St. Catherine (Garden City, 1931) and St. Joseph (Larned, 1951), but have transferred governance and management to competent laity. Heartland Center for Wholistic Health in Great Bend continues the tradition of health care as a founded ministry in Kansas. Other health care facilities held as founded ministries include two licensed skilled care facilities: Mohun Health Care Center in Columbus, and Sansbury Care Center in St. Catharine, Kentucky. In addition the Lourdes Senior Community in Waterford, Michigan, formerly sponsored by the Oxford Dominicans, includes under a single board four facilities: Lourdes Nursing Home and Rehabilitation Center, Mendelson Home (assisted living), Clausen Manor (Alzheimer's care), and Fox Manor (independent living).

=== Eco-Spirituality ===
Eco-Spirituality emerged in the late twentieth century as an important ministry for the founding congregations of Dominican Sisters of Peace. Environmental ministries are fostered at Crown Point Ecology Center, Bath, Ohio; Crystal Spring Center for Earth Learning, Plainville, Massachusetts; Heartland Farm, Pawnee Rock, Kansas; Shepherd's Corner Ecology Center, Blacklick, Ohio; and St. Catharine Farm, St. Catharine, Kentucky.

=== Spirituality Ministries ===
Spirituality ministries are exercised by the Dominican Sisters of Peace, as they make themselves available to those who are seeking to deepen their relationship with God, and to all who wish to expand the spiritual dimension of their lives. Facilities where these ministries are exercised include Rosaryville Spirit Life Center in Ponchatoula, Louisiana; Heartland Center for Spirituality in Great Bend, Kansas; Dominican Retreat and Conference Center in Niskayuna, New York; and three facilities in Michigan: Dominican Center and St. Mary's Retreat House in Oxford; and Vivian's Via Rosa in Waterford. In Columbus, the Martin de Porres Center includes in its mission programs in spirituality and facilities for spiritual direction.

=== Housing Ministries ===
Dominican Sisters of Peace have exercised their management and pastoral skills over the years as they worked to establish affordable housing for women, seniors, disabled and low-income citizens. In 1900, the de' Ricci Sisters opened a housing facility for women in Philadelphia and over the years established additional residences in New York City and Dayton, Ohio. In 1968, Columbus Dominicans joined with inner-city parishes in the management of Nazareth Towers, a HUD facility, and served there until 2003. Dominican Sisters of Peace continue to be affiliated with Cedar Park Place in Great Bend, Kansas.

=== Missions outside the US ===
Over their combined histories, Sisters from the founding congregations have ministered in Bolivia, China, Colombia, Cuba, El Salvador, Guatemala, Jamaica, Korea, Puerto Rico, Slovakia, and Taiwan. Today Dominican Sisters of Peace continue to be affiliated with missions in Honduras, Nigeria, and Peru, with additional Sisters ministering in Vietnam.

== See also ==
- Dominican Order in the United States
- Sister Matilda
