= Sunrise Mall (Brownsville, Texas) =

- Location: Brownsville, Texas, USA
- Coordinates: 25.952874°N 97.502718°W
- Address: 2370 North Expressway
- Opened: March 5 1979
- Owner: CBL & Associates
- Num. of stores: 100+
- Num. of anchor tenants: 4
- Floor area: 739,996 square feet (68,747.9 m^{2}) (GLA)
- Floors: 1 (2 in Dillard's)
- Website: http://www.sunrisemalltx.com

Sunrise Mall is an enclosed shopping mall in Brownsville, Texas, United States. It was opened in March 5 1979, only five years after the town's other mall, Amigoland Mall. Sunrise Mall features more than 100 stores, including three anchor stores Dick's Sporting Goods, Dillard's, Main Event, and JCPenney, as well as a food court and a Cinemark movie theater. The mall is managed by CBL & Associates.

== History ==
Sunrise Mall opened in 1979 on the north side of Brownsville, on the northeastern corner of Interstate 69E/U.S. Route 77/U.S. Route 83 and Ruben M. Torres, Sr. Blvd. A strip mall called Sunrise Commons later opened behind the mall as well. The mall remained largely unchanged until 1999, when Dillard's purchased the mall in association with the MG Herring Group, relocating its Kmart anchor store to the Sunrise Commons and opening a new Dillard's store in July 2000, where Kmart had been. As a result, the Dillard's in Amigoland Mall, an older mall nearby, was closed. JCPenney also moved from Amigoland Mall in 2000, and that mall was subsequently converted to a college in 2003.

Also in 2000, a food court was added to Sunrise Mall. Three years later, Dillard's sold its share of the mall (except for the Dillard's anchor) to CBL & Associates Properties. Linens 'n Things was also added in 2005, but closed in 2008 as part of the chain's bankruptcy.

The mall received an additional anchor store, Dick's Sporting Goods in 2015, along with renovations in floor tile, signs and restrooms. It added an H&M store in 2016, making it the first mall south of San Antonio to feature this store.

In June 2022, the mall opened a Main Event in place of the previous Sears anchor. It became the second Main Event to open south of San Antonio.

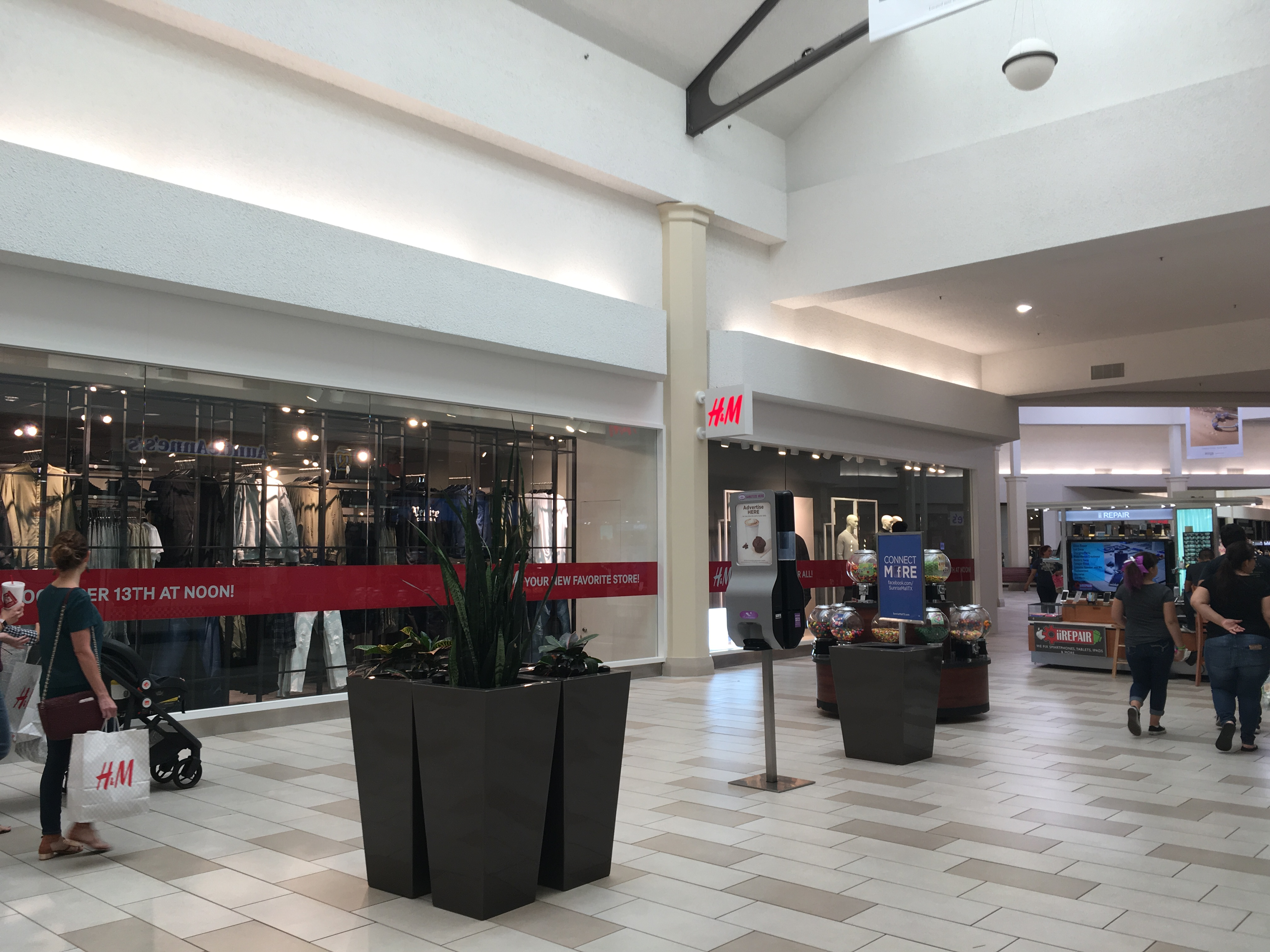
Brownsville became the first city south of San Antonio to add H&M as a junior anchor in Sunrise Mall.
