= Erika D. Beck =

American educator and university administrator

6th President of California State University, Northridge
- Incumbent
- Assumed office January 11, 2021
- Preceded by: Dianne F. Harrison

2nd President of California State University, Channel Islands
- In office August 2016 – December 2020
- Preceded by: Richard R. Rush
- Succeeded by: Richard Yao

Personal details
- Education: University of California, San Diego (BA, PhD); San Diego State University (MA)

Erika Drew Beck is an American academic administrator serving as the president of California State University, Northridge. She was previously president of California State University Channel Islands.

== Education ==
Beck earned a Bachelor of Arts degree in psychology from the University of California, San Diego, a Master of Arts in psychology from San Diego State University, and a PhD in experimental psychology from the University of California, San Diego.

== Career ==
Beck served as president of California State University Channel Islands from 2016 to 2020. Prior to becoming the president of CSUCI, Beck was the provost and executive vice president at Nevada State College in Henderson, Nevada. On October 29, 2020, Beck was named as the new president of California State University, Northridge, with a start date of January 11, 2021.

== Personal life ==
A native of California, Beck is the mother of two children.
