= Albertus Magnus College =

Catholic in New Haven, Connecticut, US

- Type: Private liberal arts college
- Established: July 13, 1925; 101 years ago
- Religious affiliation: Roman Catholic (Dominican Sisters of Peace)
- Academic affiliations: ACCU; CIC; NAICU
- Endowment: $26.2 million (2023)
- President: Marc M. Camille
- Undergraduates: 1,200 full-time
- Postgraduates: 270 full-time
- Location: New Haven, Connecticut, US; 41.332418°N 72.923909°W
- Campus: 50 acres (200,000 m^{2})
- Colors: Blue and white
- Nickname: Falcons
- Sporting affiliations: NCAA Division III – GNAC, ECAC
- Website: albertus.edu
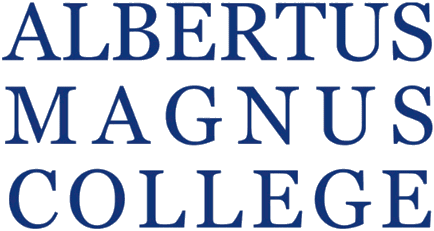

Academic rankings

Regional
- U.S. News & World Report: 98 out of 170 (tied) (North)

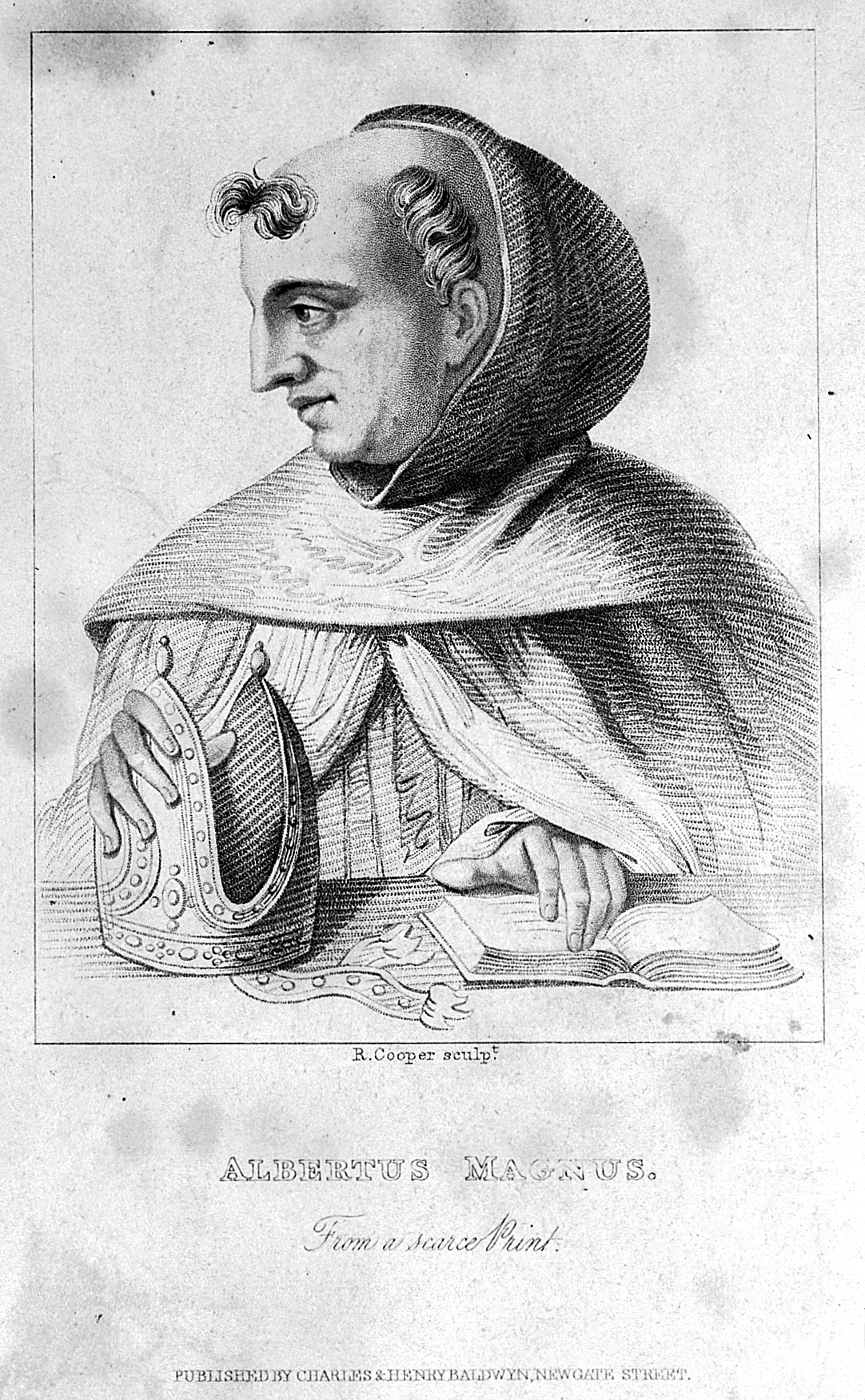
St. Albertus Magnus, namesake of the institution, was a medieval scholar and philosopher

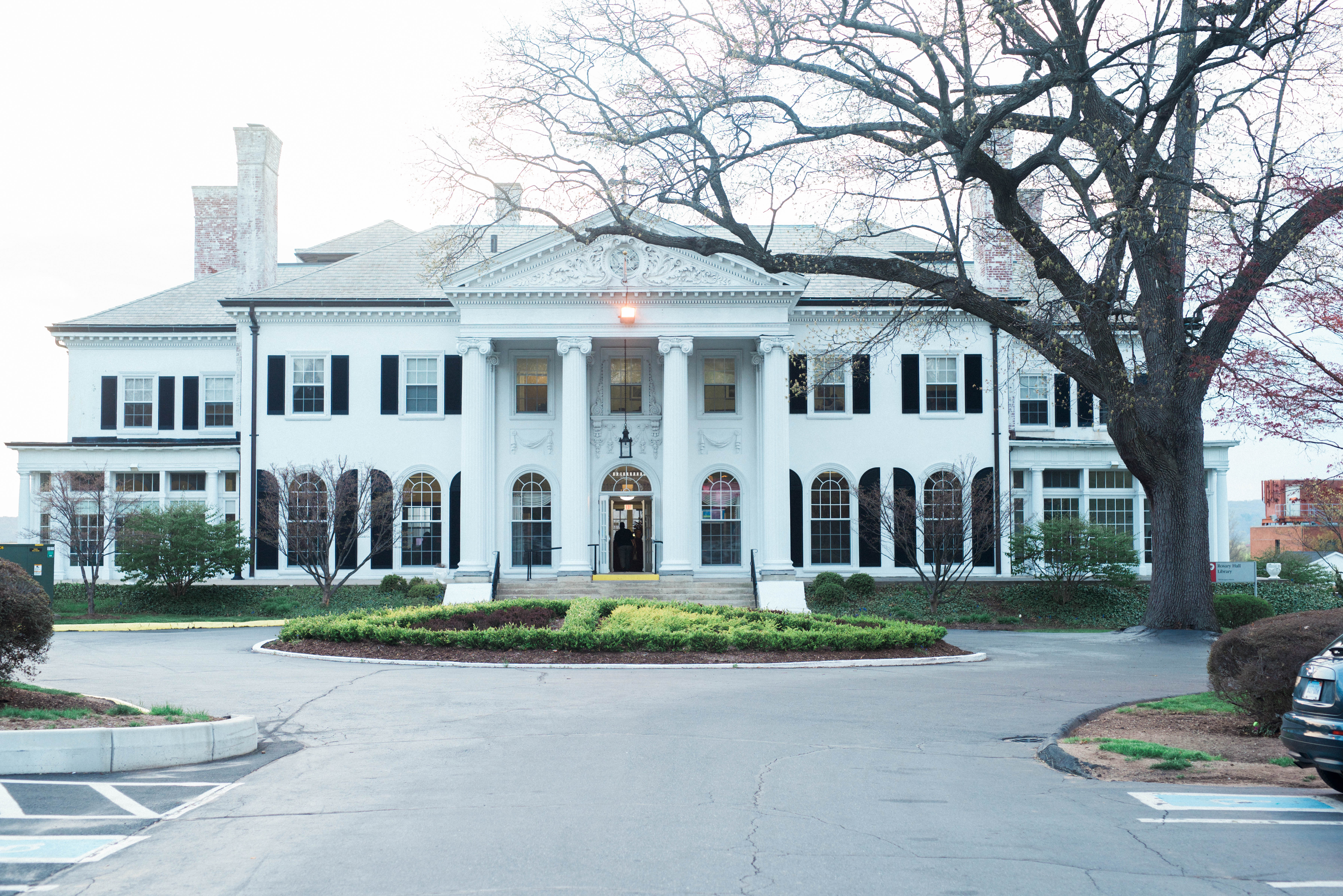
Rosary Hall, the college's first building, houses the central library.

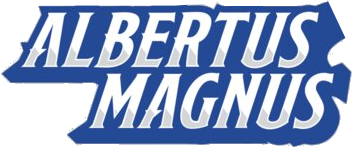
Albertus Magnus Falcons wordmark

Albertus Magnus College is a private Catholic liberal arts college in New Haven, Connecticut, United States. It was founded in 1925 by the Dominican Sisters of St. Mary of the Springs (now Dominican Sisters of Peace). Its campus is in the Prospect Hill neighborhood of New Haven, near the border with Hamden.

== History ==
Albertus Magnus College was founded in 1925 by the Dominican Sisters of St. Mary of the Springs. The dedication speaker was James Rowland Angell, the president of nearby Yale University. All classes and offices were first housed in Rosary Hall, a Palladian-style mansion that has since been converted for use as the institution's main library. The college's first chaplain, Artur Chandler, stated that the college's initial goal was to educate women "to become thinkers and leaders and the noble among the ladyhood of the future."

By 1940, the campus had expanded to its current 50-acre (20 ha) size and absorbed a variety of surrounding gilded-era mansions for use as dormitories and office space. The school became known for its strict liberal arts curriculum that required four years of Latin or Greek study.

Originally a women's college, the institution became coeducational in 1985 to some controversy, led by its longtime president Julia M. McNamara. Albertus Magnus College was the last Connecticut college to go co-ed. The 1980s also brought a series of construction projects to the campus, including new classroom space and a new athletic center. The first graduate program, a Master of Arts in Liberal Studies, was offered in 1992.

== Organization ==
Albertus Magnus is presided over by a board of trustees. A 1968 reorganization of this leadership opened 80% of spots to secular personnel while continuing to reserve 20% for members of the Dominican Sisters of Peace.

== Academics ==
In addition to undergraduate majors, minors and concentrations, including pre-professional preparation, there are graduate programs in art therapy, mental health counseling, addiction counseling, leadership, liberal studies, fine arts in creative writing, human services, business administration, education, instructional design, management and organizational leadership.

=== Undergraduate admissions ===
In 2026, Albertus Magnus accepted 64.4% of undergraduate applicants with those enrolled having an average 3.11 high school GPA. The college does not require submission of standardized test scores, the college having a test blind policy.

=== Rankings ===
In 2026, U.S. News & World Report ranked the college tied for No.98 out of 170 Regional Universities North and tied for No.23 out of 164 in Top Performers on Social Mobility. The college has a student-faculty ratio of 17 to 1.

== Campus ==
The campus is located in a residential area known as Prospect Hill near the border with Hamden. The neighborhood is on Prospect Street just above Edgerton Park and near East Rock. It sits about two miles (3 km) from the central campus of Yale University.

The institution uses several of the area's historic 19th-century mansions as residence halls and administrative offices. A number of these are contributing properties of the Prospect Hill Historic District.

== Athletics ==
Albertus Magnus College teams, nicknamed the Falcons, participate as a member of the National Collegiate Athletic Association's Division III. The Falcons are a member of the Great Northeast Athletic Conference (GNAC), and United Collegiate Hockey Conference (UCHC).

Men's sports include baseball, basketball, golf, ice hockey, soccer, tennis and swimming & diving; women's sports include basketball, field hockey, lacrosse, soccer, softball, ice hockey, swimming & diving, tennis and volleyball.

== Notable people ==
=== Alumni ===
- Ellen Bree Burns, U.S. federal judge
- Lauren DeStefano, author
- Margaret L. Drugovich, medical researcher
- Grant Ellis, TV personality
- Stephen Harding, attorney and member of the Connecticut State Senate
- Margaret Heckler, member of the U.S. House of Representatives, Massachusetts (1967–1983), 15th United States Secretary of Health and Human Services, 19th United States Ambassador to Ireland
- Jacqueline Noonan, pediatric cardiologist; described Noonan syndrome and hypoplastic left heart syndrome
- Dianne Pinderhughes, American political scientist
- Marco Rafala, novelist
- Marilyn Travinsky, politician

=== Faculty ===
- Nuala Archer, poet
- Marcella Boveri, biologist
- Lawrence J. DeNardis, U.S. Congressman and University of New Haven president
- Alice Mattison, novelist and short story writer
- Grace Evelyn Pickford, biologist
- Dorothea Rudnick, biologist
- Suzanne W. Tourtellotte, astronomer
