= Texas Southmost College =

Public junior college in Brownsville, Texas, US

- Former names: The Junior College of the Lower Rio Grande Valley, Brownsville Junior College
- Type: Public junior college
- Established: 1926; 100 years ago
- Endowment: $9,141,000
- President: Jesús Roberto Rodríguez
- Location: Brownsville, Texas, United States; 25.898495°N 97.492075°W
- Colors: Orange and blue
- Mascot: Scorpion
- Website: www.tsc.edu

Texas Southmost College (TSC) is a public junior college located in Brownsville, Texas, United States.

== History ==
=== Early history ===
Texas Southmost College was established in 1926 under the name of The Junior College of the Lower Rio Grande Valley, as a subsidiary of the local school district in Brownsville. On September 21, 1926, 84 students began classes, meeting in the old Brownsville High School. From 1928 to 1948, it was located in Brownsville High School and Brownsville Elementary School on Palm Boulevard between Washington Street and Jefferson Street. Despite hard times during the Great Depression, the college continued to maintain nominal levels of enrollment.

The name of the college changed in 1931 to Brownsville Junior College, then to Texas Southmost College in 1950. During World War II, due to wartime mobilization, enrollment dwindled, with the number of graduates halved between 1943 and 1945. A major improvement came in 1948 when the city of Brownsville acquired the lands formerly comprising the decommissioned army base known as Fort Brown, which had been closed in 1946.

By 1948, when the college had an enrollment of around 1,250 students, its own campus, and a generous budget, talks had started within the school district about creating a separate district for the college. It was decided that the new district would cover southern Cameron County. In 1950, on the silver anniversary of the college, the Brownsville Independent School District handed over the deed to the college to the newly formed Southmost Union Junior College District.

=== 1950s to 1990s ===
The Texas Southmost College athletics program flourished in the 1950s: the school had football, basketball, boxing and track teams and many of these teams won accolades for their performance. In the mid- to late 1960s, the TSC athletic program experienced a great decline and many competitive programs did not survive into the 1970s. In the 1960s, despite the declining competitive situation of the sports programs, the college gained the Rancho Del Cielo research center, located 300 miles south of Brownsville, in Mexico. This few acre research center has abundant plant life and rain forest climatic conditions. In 1973 Texas Southmost College began offering its first bachelor's degree programs and graduate courses in cooperation with Pan American University (later known as University of Texas–Pan American and located in Edinburg, Texas). This was the origin of the entity known as Pan American University at Brownsville, which worked independently from Texas Southmost College.

In the late 1980s, Pan American University created a partnership with the University of Texas System and the entity in Brownsville became known as The University of Texas–Pan American at Brownsville. Texas Southmost College and The University of Texas–Pan American at Brownsville combined their educational functions as The University of Texas at Brownsville on September 1, 1991. This created the University of Texas at Brownsville/Texas Southmost College. After 1991, UTB/TSC continued to grow, eventually boasting over 10,000 students. On November 2, 2004, voters in the Texas Southmost College district voted yes to a $68-million bond package so the college could do a number of building projects.

=== End of educational partnership with the University of Texas at Brownsville ===
On November 10, 2010, the University of Texas System Board of Regents voted to end the University of Texas at Brownsville's educational partnership with Texas Southmost College as it stood. On February 17, 2011, the TSC Board of Trustees voted 4-3 to separate from UTB. On August 31, 2015, UTB was officially dissolved and UTPA's name was changed to The University of Texas Rio Grande Valley.

=== Presidents ===
==== Presidents of Texas Southmost College ====
- Jesus R. Rodriguez 2017–present
- Michael E. Shannon 2016–2017
- Lily F. Tercero 2011–2016
- Juliet V. García 1986–2011
- Robert Phillips 1985–1986
- Albert Besteiro 1977–1985
- Arnulfo Oliveira 1971–1977
- William Walton 1970–1971
- Quentin Bogart 1968–1970
- C. J. Garland 1953–1968
- John Barron 1950–1953 (Note: John Barron was simultaneously superintendent of the BISD and president of TSC from 1950 to 1953.)

==== Presidents of Brownsville Junior College ====
- John Barron 1945–1950 (Note: All college presidents before 1950 were also superintendents of the Brownsville Independent School District.)
- Ben Brite 1941–1945
- E. C. Dodd 1934–1941
- G. W. Gotke 1931–1934

==== Presidents of Junior College of the Lower Rio Grande Valley ====
- G. W. Gotke 1928–1931
- Thomas J. Yoe 1926–1928
