= Great Lakes Collegiate Hockey League =

American Collegiate Hockey Association

- Conference: ACHA
- Founded: 2010
- Sports fielded: Men's College ice hockey
- Division: Division I
- No. of teams: 9
- Region: Great Lakes
- Most recent champion: Northwood (1st title) (2024–25)
- Most titles: Adrian Bulldogs (8 titles)
- Website: Official website

The Great Lakes Collegiate Hockey League (GLCHL) is an American Collegiate Hockey Association (ACHA) Division I level ice hockey league. The GLCHL is made up of nine schools, including one in Indiana, one in Illinois, and seven in Michigan.

== History ==
The league was announced in late 2009 and began play in the Fall of 2010 with six member teams, all located within the state of Michigan. Eastern Michigan, Michigan-Dearborn and Western Michigan all joined the league after competing as members of the Central States Collegiate Hockey League. Oakland and Adrian College previously competed as ACHA Division 1 Independents. Davenport joined after making the transition from ACHA Division 2 to Division 1. In 2012, Kent State announced they would move from the CSCHL to the league beginning in the 2012–13 season. Indiana Tech and Rochester College joined the league in the 2015–16 season. Before the 2017–18 season Indiana Tech left to join the newly formed NAIA Division. Calvin College moved up from ACHA Division 3 to fill the spot left by Indiana Tech. In 2019, Rochester and Michigan-Dearborn left the conference after the NAIA Division consolidated into the Wolverine–Hoosier Athletic Conference (WHAC), the all-sport conference for both RU and UMD. In recent years, though, the league has been able to supplement its membership with programs making the transition from ACHA D2 to D1, adding Grand Valley State for the 2020–2021 season, and Purdue University Northwest for the 2022–2023 season.

Adrian College has won the most regular season and playoff titles with seven regular season and five playoff titles.

== Format ==
The conference plays a 16-game league schedule, two games against each team—home team alternates each season. In addition team schedules will include other ACHA Division I opponents. The GLCHL holds a league championship tournament at the end of the regular season in February. The winner of the league championship advances to the ACHA National Championships which take place at Centene Community Ice Center in St. Louis, Missouri.

== Member schools ==
=== Current members ===
Institution	Location	Founded	Affiliation	Enrollment	Nickname	Joined	Left	Primary Conderence
==== Central Michigan University^{a} ====	Mount Pleasant, Michigan	1892	Public	14,135	Chippewas	2025	?	Mid-American (MAC)
Northwood University^{b}	Midland, Michigan	1959	Nonsectarian	1,344	Timberwolves	2024	?	Great Midwest (G-MAC)
Oakland University^{b}	Rochester, Michigan	1957	Public	20,519	Golden Grizzlies	2010	?	Horizon
Saginaw Valley State University^{b}	University Center, Michigan	1963	Public	7,523	Cardinals	2024	?	Great Lakes (GLIAC)
University of Michigan-Flint	Flint, Michigan	1956	Public	7,124	Kodiaks	2025	?	Non-NCAA Affiliated
University of Toledo^{a}	Toledo, Ohio	1872	Public	18,319	Rockets	2024	?	Mid-American (MAC)
Western Michigan University^{[a][c]}	Kalamazoo, Michigan	1903	Public	19,887	Broncos	2010	?	Mid-American (MAC)

=== Former members ===
Institution	Location	Founded	Affiliation	Enrollment	Nickname	Joined	Left	Current conference
Adrian College (Note: Member school left the GLCHL to form the Great Lakes Six Hockey Conference (GL6), beginning the 2024–25 school year.) (Note: Adrian has NCAA Division III hockey competing in the Northern Collegiate Hockey Association (NCHA).)	Adrian, Michigan	1859	United Methodist	1,671	Bulldogs	2010	2024	Michigan (MIAA) (Note: Currently an NCAA Division III athletic conference.)
Calvin University	Grand Rapids, Michigan	1876	Christian Reformed	3,746	Knights	2017	2024	Michigan (MIAA)
Davenport University	Grand Rapids, Michigan	1866	Nonsectarian	5,384	Panthers	2010	2024	Great Lakes (GLIAC) (Note: Currently an NCAA Division II athletic conference.)
Eastern Michigan University	Ypsilanti, Michigan	1849	Public	16,294	Eagles	2010	2024	Mid-American (MAC) (Note: Currently an NCAA Division I athletic conference.)
Grand Valley State University	Allendale, Michigan	1960	Public	24,406	Lakers	2020	2024	Great Lakes (GLIAC)
Indiana Institute of Technology	Fort Wayne, Indiana	1930	Nonsectarian	7,000	Warriors	2015	2017	Wolverine–Hoosier (WHAC) (Note: Currently an NAIA athletic conference.)
Kent State University	Kent, Ohio	1910	Public	26,822	Golden Flashes	2012	2020	Mid-American (MAC)
University of Michigan–Dearborn	Dearborn, Michigan	1959	Public	9,500	Wolverines	2010	2019	Wolverine–Hoosier (WHAC)
Purdue University Northwest	Hammond, Indiana	2016	Public	9,363	Pride	2022	2024	Great Lakes (GLIAC)
Rochester College (Note: Formerly known as Rochester College until 2019, then later known as Rochester University until 2024.)	Rochester Hills, Michigan	1959	Churches of Christ	1,100	Warriors	2015	2019	Wolverine–Hoosier (WHAC)
Roosevelt University	Chicago, Illinois	1945	Nonsectarian	3,725	Lakers	2022	2024	Great Lakes (GLIAC)

== Conference arenas ==
School	Hockey Arena	Capacity
Central Michigan	Martin Ice Arena	300
Northwood	Midland Civic Arena	1,000
Oakland	Onyx Rochester Ice Arena	750
Saginaw Valley State	Saginaw Bay Ice Arena	250
Michigan-Flint	Crystal Fieldhouse Ice Arena	350
Toledo	Team Toledo Ice House	750
Western Michigan	Wings Event Center	1,000

== Past champions ==
	Regular season	Tournament	Tournament site
2011	Adrian College	Oakland	The Peak Ice Arena, Romulus, Michigan
2012	Oakland	Adrian College	Arrington Ice Arena, Adrian, Michigan
2013	Adrian College	Davenport	Patterson Ice Center, Grand Rapids, MI
2014	Adrian College	Adrian College	ONYX Ice Arena, Rochester, MI
2015	Adrian College	Adrian College	The Rink, Battle Creek, MI
2016	Davenport	University of Michigan-Dearborn	University of Michigan-Dearborn Fieldhouse, Dearborn, MI
2017	Adrian College	University of Michigan-Dearborn	KSU Ice Arena, Kent, OH
2018	Adrian College	Adrian College	Ann Arbor Ice Cube, Ann Arbor, MI
2019	Adrian College	Adrian College	Arrington Ice Arena, Adrian, MI
2020	Adrian College	Adrian College	Patterson Ice Center, Grand Rapids, MI
2021	Adrian College	Adrian College	Griff's Georgetown, Grand Rapids, MI
2022	Adrian College	Grand Valley State	Griff's Georgetown, Grand Rapids, MI
2023	Adrian College	Adrian College	Eagles Ice Center, Grand Rapids, MI
2024	Adrian College	Purdue Northwest	Farmington Hills Ice Arena, Oakland, MI
2025	Northwood University	Northwood University	Midland Civic Arena, Midland, MI

== National tournament results ==
- 2011: #2 Davenport won the 2011 ACHA Men's DI National Championship defeating #1 Lindenwood 3–2 in overtime; #4 Adrian defeated 4–5 in 2ot by #5 Delaware in Quarter-final Round; #11 Oakland defeated 2–6 by #3 Ohio in Quarter-final Round.
- 2018: #2 ranked Adrian College won the ACHA Men's Div. I National Championship against #5 Illinois, defeating them 8–1.

== See also ==
- American Collegiate Hockey Association
- List of ice hockey leagues
