= National Women's Lacrosse League =

American college athletic conference

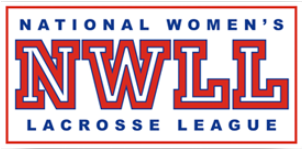
- Conference: NAIA
- Founded: 2010; 15 years ago
- Sports fielded: women's college lacrosse; men's: n/a; women's: 20
- No. of teams: 20
- Headquarters: Kansas City, Missouri
- Region: Southeast US, Midwest US

The National Women's Lacrosse League (NWLL) is a National Association of Intercollegiate Athletics (NAIA) women's lacrosse-only college athletic conference. The vast majority of NAIA women's lacrosse programs play at the club level as part of the Women's Collegiate Lacrosse Associates (WCLA). The NAIA does not currently organize the sport of lacrosse for its member institutions, although there is hope this may change in the near future. In the meantime, the NWLL is providing an umbrella organization for all women's varsity NAIA lacrosse teams in the USA, including a national championship tournament.

Founding schools of the NWLL were Indiana Institute of Technology, Missouri Baptist University, Reinhardt University, Robert Morris University (Illinois), Shorter University and Tennessee Wesleyan College. Conference play began during the 2010-11 season, culminating in the first NWLL conference tournament championship won by Indiana Tech on April 22–23, 2011 at Shorter University.

On April 26, 2011 the NWLL announced the addition of three new members for the 2011-12 academic year: Davenport University, Savannah College of Art and Design and Siena Heights University. On October 12, 2011 it was announced that Midland University would also join in 2011-12.

The Wolverine-Hoosier Athletic Conference (WHAC) announced on January 27, 2012, that it is making history by adding lacrosse for both men and women as conference sports effective the fall of 2012. The WHAC is the first conference in the NAIA to offer lacrosse as a conference championship sport. At this time, the WHAC schools are still operating under the umbrella of NWLL.

== Member schools ==
Institution	Location	Affiliation	Enrollment	Nickname	Primary Conference
Aquinas College	Grand Rapids, Michigan	Private (Catholic)	2,159	Saints	Wolverine-Hoosier
Asbury University	Wilmore, Kentucky	Private (Christian)	1,764	Eagles	KIAC
Ave Maria University	Ave Maria, Florida	Private (Catholic)	1,200	Gyrenes	The Sun Conference
Columbia College	Columbia, South Carolina	Private	1,200	Fighting Koalas	Appalachian Athletic
Davenport University	Grand Rapids, Michigan	Private	11,733	Panthers	Wolverine-Hoosier
Georgetown College	Georgetown, Kentucky	Private (Christian)	1,400	Tigers	Mid-South
Indiana Institute of Technology	Fort Wayne, Indiana	Private	3,500	Warriors	Wolverine-Hoosier
Lawrence Technological University	Southfield, Michigan	Private	4,000	Blue Devils	Wolverine-Hoosier
Lindenwood University – Belleville	Belleville, Illinois	Private	2,600	Lynx	American Midwest
Lourdes University	Sylvania, Ohio	Private (Catholic)	2,343	Gray Wolves	Wolverine-Hoosier
Missouri Baptist University	St. Louis, Missouri	Private (Christian)	4,500	Spartans	American Midwest
University of Pikeville	Pikeville, Kentucky	Private (Presbyterian)	2,300	Lady Bears	Mid-South
Point University	West Point, Georgia	Private (Christian)	1,439	Skyhawks	Appalachian Athletic
Reinhardt University	Waleska, Georgia	Private (Methodist)	1,057	Eagles	Appalachian Athletic
Robert Morris University	Chicago, Illinois	Private	7,000	Eagles	Chicagoland Collegiate
St. Andrews University (North Carolina)	Laurinburg, North Carolina	Private	600	Knights	Appalachian Athletic
Savannah College of Art and Design	Savannah, Georgia	Private	8,478	Bees	The Sun Conference
Siena Heights University	Adrian, Michigan	Private (Catholic)	2,200	Saints	Wolverine-Hoosier
Tennessee Wesleyan University	Athens, Tennessee	Private (Methodist)	1,000	Bulldogs	Appalachian Athletic
Truett-McConnell College	Cleveland, Georgia	Private (Baptist)	1,600	Bears	Appalachian Athletic

== League Championship ==
Season	Champion	Score	Runner-up	Location	Venue
2010–11	Indiana Tech (1)	15–10	Tennessee Wesleyan	Rome, GA	Shorter University
2011–12	SCAD (1)	18–17 (3 OT)	Indiana Tech	Rome, GA	Shorter University
2012–13	SCAD (2)	19–12	Indiana Tech	Rome, GA	Shorter University
2013–14	Robert Morris (1)	13–12	SCAD	Belleville, IL	Lindenwood University – Belleville
2014–15	SCAD (3)	13–6	Davenport	Belleville, IL	Lindenwood University – Belleville
2015–16	Davenport (1)	9–8 (OT)	Lawrence	Grand Rapids, MI	Davenport University

== See also ==
- NAIA lacrosse
