= Galhotra =

Galhotra is an Indian surname. Notable people with the surname include:

- Kumar Galhotra (born 1965), Indian-American entrepreneur
- Om Prakash Galhotra, Indian police officer
- Vibha Galhotra (born 1978), Indian conceptual artist
