= UM-D =

UM-D is an initialism which may refer to:

- University of Michigan–Dearborn
- University of Minnesota, Duluth

== See also ==
- University of Maryland, often abbreviated UMD
