= Great Midwest Hockey League =

ACHA Division 2 club ice hockey league

- Conference: ACHA
- Sports fielded: ACHA men's ice hockey; men's: 6; women's: 0
- Division: Division 2
- No. of teams: 6
- Headquarters: East Lansing, Michigan
- Region: Michigan and Ohio
- Official website: GMHL Website

The Great Midwest Hockey League (GMHL) is an ACHA Division 2 club ice hockey league consisting of teams in the Great Lakes region of the United States.

== 2018-2019 Teams ==
Institution	Location	Team Nickname
Adrian College	Adrian, Michigan	Bulldogs
Davenport University	Grand Rapids, Michigan	Panthers
Grand Valley State University	Allendale, Michigan	Lakers
Indiana University	Bloomington, Indiana	Hoosiers
Michigan State University	East Lansing, Michigan	Spartans
University of Michigan	Ann Arbor, Michigan	Wolverines
Trine University	Angola, Indiana	Thunder

== Former teams ==
- Central Michigan University
- Ferris State University - Began competing in ACHA Division 3 beginning 2017.
- Miami University - Began competing in the Tri-State Collegiate Hockey League in 2017.
- Oakland University - An original member of the GMHL, Oakland University left after the 2005-06 season as the team transitioned to ACHA Division 1.
- Ohio State University - Began competing in the Tri-State Collegiate Hockey League in 2016.
- Robert Morris College - Chicago
- University of Dayton
- University of Illinois
- Club Ice Hockey at Indiana University- As of the 2019-2020 season, Indiana plays in the Tri-State Collegiate Hockey League

== See also ==
- American Collegiate Hockey Association
- List of ice hockey leagues
