= 2012 Wolverine–Hoosier Athletic Conference women's basketball tournament =

- Classification: Division II
- Teams: 8
- Champions: Davenport
- Wolverine–Hoosier Athletic Conference women's basketball tournaments

The 2012 Wolverine–Hoosier Athletic Conference women's basketball tournament is the 2012 post-season tournament for Wolverine–Hoosier Athletic Conference, an NAIA Division II athletic conferences.

== Format ==
Out of the league's 10 teams, the top eight receive berths in the conference tournament. After the 18-game conference season, teams are seeded by conference record.

== Bracket ==
Quarterfinals; February 23
1	Davenport	70
8	Indiana Tech	50
4	Siena Heights	63
5	Cornerstone	41
2	Concordia	69
7	Aquinas	66
3	Northwestern Ohio	51
6	Madonna	74

Semifinals; February 25
1	Davenport	75
4	Siena Heights	47
2	Concordia	89
6	Madonna	71

Championship; February 28
1	Davenport	65
2	Concordia	49
