= 2013 Wolverine–Hoosier Athletic Conference women's basketball tournament =

- Classification: Division II
- Teams: 8
- Champions: Davenport
- Wolverine–Hoosier Athletic Conference women's basketball tournaments

2012–13 Wolverine–Hoosier Athletic Conference women's basketball standings
	Conf.				Overall
Team	W		L	PCT	W		L	PCT
No. 6 Davenport†	20	–	2	.909	34	–	3	.919
No. 10 Concordia	20	–	2	.909	28	–	7	.800
No. 20 Siena Heights	17	–	5	.773	23	–	9	.719
Madonna	15	–	7	.682	20	–	11	.645
Cornerstone	13	–	9	.591	19	–	12	.613
Indiana Tech	11	–	11	.500	13	–	18	.419
UM-Dearborn	9	–	13	.409	10	–	19	.345
Northwestern Ohio	8	–	14	.364	11	–	20	.355
Aquinas	8	–	14	.364	12	–	16	.429
Lourdes	6	–	16	.273	9	–	21	.300
Lawrence Tech	5	–	17	.227	7	–	19	.269
Marygrove	0	–	22	.000	1	–	27	.036
† 2013 Wolverine–Hoosier Athletic Conference tournament winner As of March 18, 2012; Rankings from Coaches Poll

The 2013 Wolverine–Hoosier Athletic Conference women's basketball tournament is the 2013 post-season tournament for Wolverine–Hoosier Athletic Conference, an NAIA Division II athletic conference.

== Format ==
Out of the league's 12 teams, the top eight receive berths in the conference tournament. After the 22-game conference season, teams are seeded by conference record.

== Bracket ==
Quarterfinals; February 20
1	Davenport	84
8	Northwestern Ohio	58
4	Madonna	69
5	Cornerstone	43
2	Concordia	77
7	UM-Dearborn	55
3	Siena Heights	78
6	Indiana Tech	59

Semifinals; February 23
1	Davenport	94
4	Madonna	75
2	Concordia	71
3	Siena Heights	63

Championship; February 25
1	Davenport	91
2	Concordia	61
