= Yaprak =

- Gender: Feminine
- Language: Turkish

Origin
- Language: Turkish
- Origin: "yaprak"
- Derivation: "yaprak"
- Meaning: "leaf"

Yaprak is a common feminine Turkish given name. In Turkish, "Yaprak" means "leaf".

== Given name ==
- Yaprak Baltacioğlu (born 1959), Turkish Canadian public servant, lawyer, and professor
- Yaprak Erkek (born 2001), Turkish volleyball player
- Yaprak Gürsoy (born 1978), Turkish scholar
- Yaprak Özdemiroğlu (born 1963), Turkish actress

== Surname ==
- Ece Yaprak, American engineering academic

== Fictional characters ==
- Yaprak İzmirli, a character in Avrupa Yakası.
