= Davenport Panthers =

Athletic teams that represent Davenport University

Coordinates: 42.8498°N 85.5307°W

- University: Davenport University
- Nickname: Panthers
- NCAA: Division II
- Conference: GLIAC (primary); GLVC (men's lacrosse and men's wrestling)
- Athletic director: Paul Lowden
- Location: Grand Rapids, Michigan
- Varsity teams: 32 (17 men's, 15 women's)
- Football stadium: Farmers Insurance Athletic Complex
- Basketball arena: Student Center
- Ice hockey arena: Patterson Ice Center
- Baseball stadium: Farmers Insurance Athletic Complex
- Softball stadium: Farmers Insurance Athletic Complex
- Soccer stadium: Farmers Insurance Athletic Complex
- Volleyball arena: Student Center
- Colors: Red and black
- Mascot: Pounce the Panther
- Website: dupanthers.com
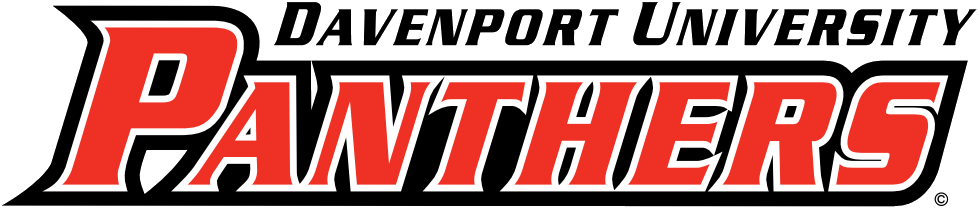

The Davenport Panthers are the athletic teams that represent Davenport University, located in Caledonia Township, Michigan, in intercollegiate sports as a member of the NCAA Division II level of the National Collegiate Athletic Association (NCAA), primarily competing in the Great Lakes Intercollegiate Athletic Conference (GLIAC) for most of its sports as a provisional member since the 2017–18 academic year (achieving D-II full member status in 2019–20). The Panthers previously competed in the Wolverine–Hoosier Athletic Conference (WHAC) of the National Association of Intercollegiate Athletics (NAIA) from 2005–06 to 2016–17.

== Other affiliations ==
Men's lacrosse and wrestling currently compete as members of the Great Lakes Valley Conference (GLVC). In addition, the university's competitive cheer and Stunt teams compete as members of the National Cheerleaders Association (NCA) while the DU competitive dance team competes in the National Dance Association (NDA). Davenport added varsity Esports as a member of the National Association of Collegiate Esports (NACE) in 2018.

In addition to NCAA sports, DU also offers additional sports that the NCAA does not currently sponsor championships. Men's rugby competes at the Division I level of USA Rugby's Midwest Rugby Union, as well as a JV team at the D-II level. Men's ice hockey competes in the ACHA Division I in the Great Lakes Collegiate Hockey League (GLCHL), as well as a JV team at the ACHA DIII level.

== Varsity teams ==
Davenport competes in 21 intercollegiate varsity sports and 21 non-varsity sports: Men's sports include baseball, basketball, cross country, football, golf, lacrosse, soccer, swimming & diving, tennis, track & field and wrestling; while women's sports include basketball, cross country, golf, lacrosse, soccer, softball, swimming & diving, tennis, track & field and volleyball. Non-varsity men's sports include bowling, eSports, ice hockey (ACHA DI, DII & DIII), marching band, pep band, rugby and volleyball; while non-varsity women's sports include bowling, cheerleading (NCA & sideline), dance, eSports, ice hockey (ACHA DI), marching band, pep band, pompon, rugby, stunt and wrestling. Men's and women's varsity teams in ultimate will be added in 2023–24.

Men's sports	Women's sports
Baseball	Basketball
Basketball	Bowling (Note: Non-NCAA sport.)
Bowling	Cross country
Cross country	Esports
Esports	Golf
Football	Ice hockey
Golf	Lacrosse
Ice hockey	Power lifting
Lacrosse	Soccer
Power lifting	Softball
Rugby	Swimming
Soccer	Tennis
Swimming	Track and field
Tennis	Ultimate frisbee
Track and field	Volleyball
Volleyball	
Wrestling	

=== Men's basketball ===
The men's basketball team plays its games at 1,500-seat DU Student Center. The Panthers won their first WHAC conference champions in 2012. The team appeared three NAIA Men's Division II Basketball Championships tournaments 2010, 2011, and 2012. The team reached the quarterfinal round in 2011 and in 2012, the Panthers reached the NAIA DII Final Four for the first time in the program's history. In their first NAIA Final Four appearance, the third-ranked Panthers lost to the second-ranked and eventual 2012 Champions, Oregon Tech 50–55.

=== Ice hockey ===
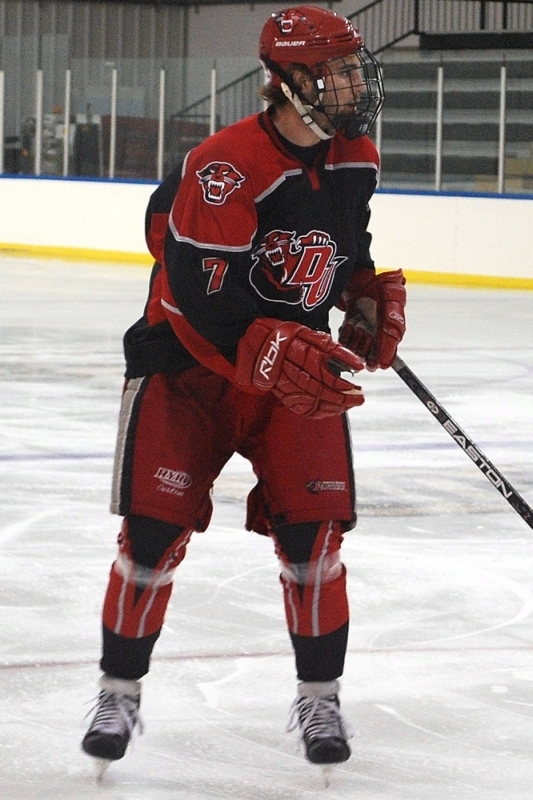
DU hockey player in an away uniform (2010)

The Davenport men's ice hockey program started in 2002 through the 2009–2010 season the program competed in at the American Collegiate Hockey Association (ACHA) Division II level in the Great Midwest Hockey League (GMHL). Since the 2008–2009 season, DU has also fielded a second/JV team participating at the ACHA Division III level in the Michigan Collegiate Hockey Conference (MCHC).

Davenport hockey captured three straight Division II National Championships in 2008, 2009, and 2010. As of the conclusion of the 2009–10 season the Panthers had a record of 325–75–13 (.803).

In the 2010–11 season, the program moved to the ACHA Division I level in the Great Lakes Collegiate Hockey League. The team finished their first season at the ACHA DI level with an overall record of 36–10–0 and 15–4–0 in the GLCHL. On March 9, 2011, Davenport won the ACHA Men's Division I National Championship 3–2 in overtime against two-time defending champions Lindenwood. The team finished the 2011–12 regular season with an overall record of 21–21–0 and 15–5–0 in the GLCHL. Despite losing in the GLCHL playoffs, the Panthers received an at-large bid to the 2012 ACHA Men's Division I National Championship, ranked 14th. In the opening round, the team defeated Drexel 4–1 before the team lost 1–3 to Delaware, the eventual 2012 ACHA DI Champions.

=== Football ===
Davenport's football program debuted in the 2016 season, finishing 6–5 in the NAIA under coach Lou Esposito. Esposito resigned at season's end to take a position with Western Michigan. Davenport hired Ferris State assistant Sparky McEwen to replace him as the team moved up to the NCAA's Division II.

In 2022, Davenport had the best season in program history, finishing the regular season at 8–2 and qualifying for the Division II playoffs for the first time. It also ranked as high as No. 13 in national polls. Davenport's two regular season losses were to Grand Valley State and Ferris State, each of which spent part of the season as the No. 1 ranked team in the country.

In its first playoff appearance, Davenport again faced the eventual national champion Ferris State, losing 41–7.

After the 2023 NFL draft, Davenport wide receiver Sy Barnett was signed by the New Orleans Saints as an undrafted free agent, making him the first player in program history to receive an NFL contract.

=== Men's lacrosse ===
Men's lacrosse program began in 2008 and joined the NCAA ranks in the 2019–20 academic year. Prior to NCAA competition, the Panthers competed as a member of the MCLA Division I in the Central Collegiate Lacrosse Association; In 2011, the Panthers defeated the two-time defending champion, St. Thomas 14–9 in the MCLA Division II National Championship game to win the school's first lacrosse championship. The win concluded a program best record of 18–5. In addition to the 2011 Championship, the Panthers have received bids to the MCLA Division II Tournament three straight seasons in 2009, 2010, and 2011. The 2013 season was their 1st season as a MLCA Division I program. In addition to MCLA competition, DU won the first NAIA men's lacrosse national invitational tournament with a 13–10 win on May 7, 2016. DU elevated the program from MCLA to NCAA status in 2019 and after playing the 2020 season as an independent, announced the team will join the Great Lakes Valley Conference (GLVC) in 2020–21.

=== Women's lacrosse ===
Women's lacrosse joined the NAIA independent National Women's Lacrosse League (NWLL) starting in the 2011–12 academic year. The NWLL served as the governing body during emerging sport status for NAIA women's lacrosse. Following creation of a national invitational tournament, DU won the inaugural NAIA title. The program began in 2008 as a member of the WDIA Division II in the Women's Collegiate Lacrosse League. In the first four seasons the team compiled a record of 27–35–1 at the WDIA club level and a record of 10–9 in its first season of NAIA competition with a 4–6 NWLL record in 2011–12.

=== Rugby ===
Davenport Rugby competes in the Division 1-A of college rugby. The team plays its home games at DU Turf Field. College rugby is governed by USA Rugby as the sport is not governed by the NAIA or NCAA. Men's rugby is one of the newest varsity sport offerings by Davenport University, first played in 2009. Davenport began its rugby program, in part due to the growth of rugby in Grand Rapids and throughout western Michigan. Davenport began its rugby program with big ambitions, stating their goal of becoming a premier rugby program in the midwest and advancing to the USA Rugby national championship playoffs.

Davenport played its inaugural 2009–2010 season in Division II. The team opened its season in September 2009 with a 100–0 shutout win over Wayne State. The Panthers finished the 2009–2010 season with a record of 11–3, went 8–0 in conference play, and notched an impressive non-conference 27–5 win over DI-AA program Michigan State.

The Panthers first-year success led the Panthers to compete in Division I-AA in the 2010–2011 season. Despite stepping up to a higher level of competition, the Panthers had another strong season, going 3–1 in conference play, and notching impressive non-conference wins against College Premier Division (DI-A) opponents Notre Dame and Ohio State, as well as DI-AA powerhouses Michigan State and Wisconsin. A come-from-behind 29–27 win over Indiana in the fall of 2010 meant that Davenport qualified for the spring 2011 USA Rugby Division 1 National Championship tournament. In the university's first appearance in the tournament, Davenport entered the 16-team tournament as the 16th seed and only at-large bid. Davenport first shutout Minnesota 27–0 in the round of 16, before defeating Kansas State 46–5 in the quarterfinals to earn a spot in the USA Rugby semifinals, held in Stanford, California. Davenport defeated Harvard 62–21 in the D1 National Semifinals to clinch a berth in the championship. In the championship game Davenport defeated UC-Santa Barbara 38–19 to win the USA Rugby Men's Division I Rugby Championship, in only the program's second season of play and the program's first season in Division 1. Davenport's freshman flyhalf JP Eloff was named the tournament MVP, scoring 22 points in the semifinal and 25 points in the final. Davenport finished the championship season with a record of 15–2 and outscored opponents by a combined score of 595 to 255.

In its third season, the Panthers began the 2011–2012 season ranked #1 in preseason polls. The 2011–2012 season was another successful campaign for the Panthers, going 6–0 in conference play, and finishing the regular season ranked #1 in D1-AA. The strong play of flyhalf J.P. Eloff, the leading scorer in D1-AA, led to Eloff being selected to participate in trials for the US national team. In the playoffs, Davenport beat Texas 87–0 in the round of 16, defeated Wisconsin 34–11 in the quarterfinals, and defeated Dartmouth 35–18 in the semifinals. The win over Dartmouth placed the Panthers in the championship for the second consecutive season. In the 2012 championship game, Davenport shutout San Diego State 39–0 to win 2012 USA Rugby Division I-AA National Championship. The Panthers 2011–12 season was marked by the Panthers going undefeated in collegiate competition. The team had a loss to Utah in the semifinal round of Qualifier Tournament for the 2012 USA Sevens Collegiate Rugby Championship and exhibition losses against the Chicago Griffins and Chicago Lions, both of the Rugby Super League.

For the 2012–13 season, Davenport moved up to play in Division 1-A.

== Championships ==
=== National championships ===
Sport	Association(s)	Titles	Winning years
Ice Hockey (m)	ACHA	4	2008, 2009, 2010, 2011
Lacrosse (m)	MCLA, NAIA	2	2011, 2016
Lacrosse (w)	NWLL, NAIA	1	2016
Rugby (m)	USA Rugby	2	2011, 2012
Cheerleading	NCA	5	2013, 2014, 2015, 2016, 2017
STUNT	NCA	3	2015, 2016, 2017
Soccer (m)	NAIA	1	2014

=== Conference championships ===
i. Wolverine-Hoosier Athletic Conference (WHAC):

Basketball (M)	2012
Basketball (W)	2006, 2007, 2008, 2011, 2012, 2013
Golf (M)	2006, 2007, 2008
Soccer (M)	2005, 2010
Softball	2011, 2012
Tennis (W)	2012

ii. American Heartland Conference Champions

Bowling (W)	2010, 2011

iii. Great Lakes Collegiate Hockey League (GLCHL): 2011

iv. Great Midwest Hockey League (GMHL): 2006, 2007, 2008, 2009, 2010

v. Great Lakes Intercollegiate Hockey Association (GLIHA): 2004

vi. Midwest Rugby Eastern Conference (MREC): 2011
