= Pamela Good =

Co-founder and CEO of "Beyond Basics"

- Born: 12 October 1959 (age 66)
- Education: University of Michigan–Dearborn
- Occupation: Entrepreneur
- Known for: Co-founder, President & Executive director "Beyond Basics"

Pamela Good is the co-founder and CEO of "Beyond Basics", a nonprofit organization that provides literacy interventions to students across the state of Michigan.

== Education ==
Pamela graduated from University of Michigan-Dearborn in 2001.

== Career ==
In 1999, Good began delivering coats to struggling inner-city schools in Detroit. Within several years, she realized many of the children lacked the ability to read at grade-level. This led her to formally incorporate "Beyond Basics" as a 501c (3) non-profit organization in 2002, which offers intensive one-on-one reading tutoring and literacy enrichment programs for K-12 students.

In an effort to close what Good calls the “literacy gap,” she launched the Reading Readiness, Read to Rise, and Scholars programs through Beyond Basics.

In 2018, after receiving funding from General Motors, Good opened the Durfee Family Literacy Center at the Durfee Innovation Society to serve neighborhood residents. As of 2024, Good’s non-profit Beyond Basics serves more than 50 locations, with thousands of children participating annually in its programs.

== Recognitions ==
- 2019 - Named "2019 Michiganian of the Year"
- 2022 - Recognized and named one of Crain's 2022 "Notable Women in Nonprofits"
