= University of Michigan-Dearborn Fieldhouse =

Athletic facility in Dearborn, Michigan

- Interactive map of University of Michigan-Dearborn Fieldhouse
- Location: Dearborn, Michigan, United States
- Coordinates: 42.3146°N 83.2287°W
- Owner: University of Michigan-Dearborn
- Operator: University of Michigan-Dearborn
- Capacity: 1,500 (hockey); 2,500 (basketball & volleyball)
- Surface: 185' x 85'(hockey)

Tenant
- Michigan-Dearborn Wolverines

The University of Michigan-Dearborn Fieldhouse is a multi-purpose arena/athletic facility located in Dearborn, Michigan on the campus of University of Michigan-Dearborn.

The facility houses a 2,500-seat multi-purpose gymnasium that is the home to the Michigan-Dearborn Men's and Women's basketball teams, and UMD Women's Volleyball team competing at the NAIA Division II level in the Wolverine–Hoosier Athletic Conference (WHAC).

The Fieldhouse also houses a 1,500-seat ice arena that serves as the home for Wolverines Men's Ice Hockey team competing at the ACHA Division I level in the NAIA Hockey Division and the Wolverine-Hoosier Athletic Conference.

The fieldhouse is also used for recreation and Intramural sports.
