= Ralph Prator =

American academic administrator (1907-2005)

1st President of San Fernando Valley State College
- In office 1958–1968
- Preceded by: Office established
- Succeeded by: James W. Cleary

2nd President of Bakersfield College
- In office August 1950 – 1958
- Preceded by: Grace Van Dyke Bird
- Succeeded by: Ed Simonsen

Personal details
- Born: November 16, 1907 La Veta, Colorado, U.S.
- Died: July 25, 2005 (aged 97) Camarillo, California, U.S.
- Spouse: Lois (d. 1996)
- Children: 3
- Education: University of Colorado Boulder (BA, MA); University of California, Berkeley (EdD)
- Profession: College administrator

Ralph Prator (November 16, 1907 – July 25, 2005) was an American college administrator. He served as the first president of San Fernando Valley State College (now known as California State University, Northridge) from 1958 to 1968.

== Academic career ==
Prator received bachelor's and master's degrees in history from the University of Colorado Boulder, and his Ed.D. from the University of California, Berkeley. He briefly played minor league professional baseball with the St. Louis Cardinals farm system. He was a high school principal in Colorado and later became dean of men and athletic director at Mesa College (now Colorado Mesa University). Prator served as an administrator at the University of Colorado beginning in 1940, but interrupted his academic career to serve in the United States Navy during World War II. He was hired as the President of Bakersfield College in 1950, and in 1958 he became the inaugural President of California State University, Northridge (then San Fernando Valley State College). Prator served in this role until stepping down from the presidency in 1968, teaching six more years as a professor of education until his retirement in 1974. Prator was succeeded in his role as president by James W. Cleary. In addition, he was involved in various community organizations in Los Angeles after he resigned from the San Fernando Valley State College presidency.

== Impact ==
Prator presided over tremendous growth while president at both Bakersfield College and San Fernando Valley State College. He supervised the construction of more than a dozen buildings at Bakersfield College and nine buildings at San Fernando Valley State College. Faculty increased from 100 to 600 during Prator's tenure, and student enrollment grew from 3,500 to 16,000, although there were occasional barriers to campus growth. Prator worked toward increasing the number of faculty—and their salaries—but was frustrated in his efforts. He was one of the few presidents in the California State College system who supported a statewide faculty senate in 1962. As a former director of admissions at the University of Colorado, Prator was appointed to the California Master Plan for Higher Education Committee on Selection and Retention of Students, and it was in this role that he opposed a "college preparatory curriculum for the state colleges." Toward the end of Prator's tenure as president, student activism greatly increased, and Prator began to find himself the target of public student protests, the most extreme of which came after his resignation. His initial response to student unrest was optimistic, but the continuing unrest in the late 1960s eventually led him to retreat to the teaching ranks.

== Personal life ==
Prator was married to Lois Prator until her death in 1996. They had three children together. Prator died on July 25, 2005, in Camarillo, California.

== Bibliography ==
Prator authored one book:

- Prator, Ralph (1963). The College President. New York: The Center for Applied Research in Education.
