= James W. Cleary =

American academic administrator (1927–2007)

James Cleary

2nd President of California State University, Northridge
- In office October 21, 1969 – 1992
- Preceded by: Ralph Prator
- Succeeded by: Blenda Wilson

Personal details
- Born: James William Cleary; April 16, 1927 Milwaukee, Wisconsin
- Died: April 28, 2007 (aged 80) Boise, Idaho
- Spouse: Mary
- Children: 3
- Education: Marquette University (BA, MA); University of Wisconsin–Madison (PhD)
- Profession: College administrator

James William Cleary (April 16, 1927 – April 28, 2007) was an American university administrator and editor. He was the co-editor of multiple editions of Robert's Rules of Order and served as the second president of California State University, Northridge from 1969 to 1992.

== Academic career ==
Born April 16, 1927, in Milwaukee, Wisconsin, Cleary received his bachelor's and master's degrees from Marquette University and his Ph.D. from the University of Wisconsin–Madison. He taught speech at the University of Wisconsin and later rose to the administrative ranks, ending his tenure at Wisconsin as the Vice Chancellor for Academic Affairs. Cleary became President of California State University, Northridge (CSUN) in 1969 and served until his retirement in 1992.

== Impact ==
Cleary served at San Fernando Valley State College during a time of great unrest. Immediately before Cleary arrived on campus in 1969, the presidential suite had been destroyed by an arsonist, and the acting president along with his staff had been held against their will by protesters in the administration building amid racial turmoil. Early in Cleary's tenure as president, a case was brought against twenty-one students, "the first mass prosecution of student protesters on felony charges and the first attempt at conspiracy convictions." Cleary brought campus disciplinary charges (including expulsion) against all of the students after many of them were convicted in Los Angeles County Superior Court on a variety of felonies, including kidnapping, conspiracy to commit kidnapping, and false imprisonment. Roy Wilkins of the NAACP wrote a personal letter to Cleary protesting the campus disciplinary actions, given that almost all of the accused students were African American. Toward the end of his time at CSUN in 1991, Cleary followed the lead of the CSUN Faculty Senate and rejected a proposed campus regulation that would have prohibited discriminatory speech against gays and ethnic minorities, despite advocacy of the measure by student leaders and the campus affirmative action coordinator.

In 1991, after anti-gay flyers were found on the campus, Los Angeles Mayor Tom Bradley wrote Cleary a letter condemning gay intolerance at CSUN: "Bigotry and hatred clearly have no place in any community, especially a college campus." Cleary also condemned the message of the flyers, but expressed dismay that Bradley made the letter public before Cleary received it.

Cleary encouraged campus interaction with Chinese universities in the early 1980s. The newly appointed Chinese ambassador to the United States, Han Xu, gave his first speech in the United States at CSUN.

Cleary oversaw the transition from San Fernando Valley State College to California State University, Northridge in 1972. He also brought the university to NCAA Division I status in 1990, and raised funding to build dozens of buildings on campus. CSUN became known for its prominent deaf studies program, which was another Cleary legacy. Cleary weathered student and faculty protests, scandals, and budget crises to last 23 years at CSUN. In 1986 he was chosen by the Exxon Education Foundation as "one of the 100 most effective college presidents in the nation." At the time of his retirement in 1992, Cleary had grown the university to 30,000 students and had increased the number of degree programs by 50 percent.

== Personal life ==
Cleary was married to Mary Cleary until her death in 2002. They had three children together. Cleary died on April 28, 2007, in Boise, Idaho.

== Publications ==
Cleary published several books during his career.

- A Bibliography of Parliamentary Procedure (Lehigh University Press, 1962)
- Rhetoric and Public Address : a Bibliography; 1947-1961 (University of Wisconsin Press, 1964)
- John Bulwer's Chirologia: The Natural Language of the Hand, and Chironomia: or, The Art of Manual Rhetoric (Southern Illinois University Press, 1974)
- Robert's Rules of Order, Newly Revised (Scott, Foresman, 1970)
