= Armenian Research Center =

The Center for Armenian Research and Publication (Armenian Research Center) was established by Dr. Dennis R. Papazian in 1985 for the documentation/publication in the field of Armenian studies. The Armenian Research Center is the only such research institute devoted to the study of the Armenians at any U.S. university.

In partial fulfillment of its stated goal above, the Armenian Research Center controls a library, which was named the John Vigen Der Manuelian Research Library because the core of the collection comes from the Boston-area educator and community activist. Though the Archives, as yet are unnamed.

== See also ==
- University of Michigan–Dearborn
- Denial of the Armenian genocide
- Armenian genocide
