= Claire-Marie Brisson =

French preceptor and Francophone podcaster

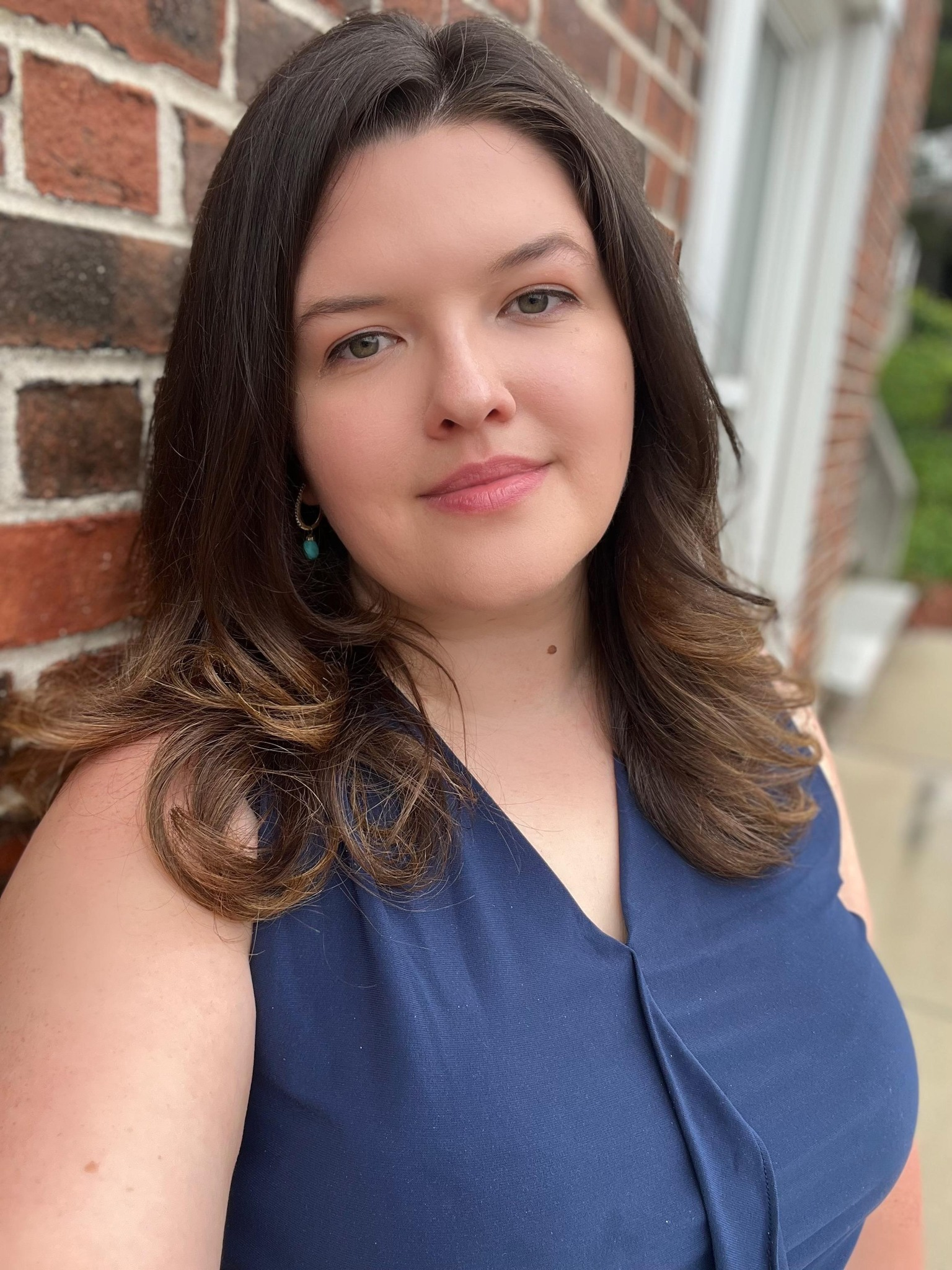
- Brisson in 2023
- Born: Claire-Marie Brisson; April 26, 1991 (age 34); Detroit, Michigan, USA

Claire-Marie Brisson (born April 26, 1991) is an American university instructor (preceptor), researcher, podcaster, and cultural advocate. Her research examines the relationship between minority French speakers and the Francophonie. In her work and teaching, she brings to light the histories of minority French speakers in North America, including Franco-Americans and French Canadians. She is the founder and host of the podcast The North American Francophone Podcast, an English-language resource discussing Francophone topics.

Brisson is a preceptor in French at Harvard University, where she serves as the Course Head for intermediate and advanced French courses. Her course, "Discovering French in North America," received considerable media attention in French-language media upon its launch in fall 2022, including a video feature on TV5Monde during the Organisation Internationale de la Francophonie's 2022 Francophonie Summit (Sommet de la francophonie) in Djerba.

As a result of her expertise in North American Francophonie, she was invited to be the keynote speaker at the 38th Assemblée régionale Amérique of the Assemblée parlementaire de la Francophonie in Baton Rouge, Louisiana in September 2023. She is also the guest editor of the 2024 issue of Études Francophones, a refereed journal published at the University of Louisiana at Lafayette in French and English.

Brisson serves as a board member of the Nous Foundation in Detroit launched by Mélissa Baril, Scott Tilton, and Rudy Bazenet. Nous Detroit is the foundation's first foray outside of Louisiana. She is also a member of the Executive Council for the American Association of Teachers of French (AATF) for Eastern Massachusetts.

== Biography ==
Claire-Marie Brisson was born in Detroit, Michigan and grew up in Dearborn, Michigan. In an interview with Radio-Canada, Brisson remarks how important it is for her to identify with her American and Canadian roots, mentioning her family's village Saint-Fabien-de-Panet and her grandfather, Ernest Brisson, who was an early influence in her contemporary efforts to bring visibility to Franco-Americans and other Francophone communities in North America. An interview with her father, Louis Brisson, provides context for his own Francophone identity in a December 2019 podcast.

Brisson graduated from the University of Michigan-Dearborn in 2013 with a Bachelor of Arts in French and Secondary Education and was awarded the title of UM-Dearborn Difference Maker, awarded to students that are known to be "at the forefront of their fields." She then pursued a Master of Arts in French at Wayne State University. In 2016, Brisson began her doctoral studies at the University of Virginia and wrote her dissertation under the direction of Janet Horne, receiving a PhD in 2021. Upon the completion of her doctorate, Brisson began her role as a Preceptor in French in the Department of Romance Languages and Literatures at Harvard University in 2021, where she currently teaches.

== The North American Francophone Podcast ==
Brisson started The North American Francophone Podcast in November 2019. Several French-language radio broadcasts generated interest for the podcast for bilingual listeners to tune in and translate their research, stories, and interests into English. In 2023, the Elias Makos show - an English-language radio show based out of Montreal - asked her to share her perspective in English about the promotion of French outside of Quebec.
