= Central States Collegiate Hockey League =

- Conference: American Collegiate Hockey Association (ACHA)
- Founded: 1970
- Ceased: 2024
- Commissioner: Brian Moran
- Sports fielded: Ice hockey
- Division: Division I
- No. of teams: 2
- Headquarters: Union Lake, Michigan
- Region: Midwest and Great Lakes
- Official website: http://www.cschl.com/

Locations
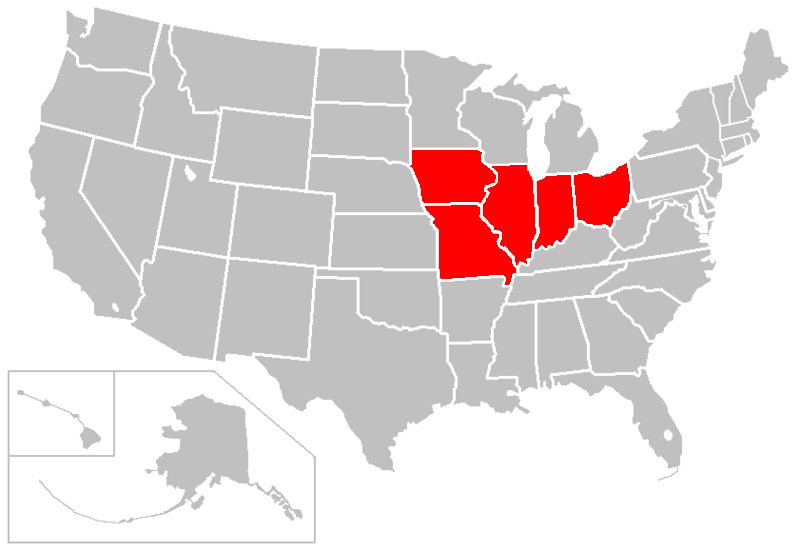

The Central States Collegiate Hockey League (CSCHL) was a Division I ACHA level hockey-college athletic conference. The CSCHL was one of the top ranked ACHA leagues. In its final state, it contained two member teams in the Midwestern United States.

== Format ==
League teams played a 20-game league schedule, plus additional regular season games against non-league opponents. Following the regular season, the league held a Championship Tournament. The CSCHL Regular Season champion team was then awarded an automatic bid to the annual ACHA Men's Division I National Tournament.

== History ==
The league began in 1970 with Chicago State University, Illinois State University and Iowa State University as founding members. The following season the league expanded to 24 teams in 3 divisions making the CSCHL the premier ice hockey conference in the midwest. Joining the CSCHL included Bradley University, Drake University, Illinois Benedictine University, Illinois Institute of Technology, Lewis University, Northeastern Illinois University, and Western Illinois University. The University of Illinois joined shortly after in 1974.

The league saw great expansion in the early 1990s when the University of Michigan-Dearborn joined after operating as an NAIA varsity program. Ohio University followed in 1993 and Kent State University joined in 1994 after the university dropped NCAA hockey. Following the 2003 season, UW-Whitewater departed & dropped down to play ACHA D2. In 2004, Robert Morris University-Illinois joined the league, followed by Lindenwood University in 2006. After the 2008 season, Saint Louis University departed to play at the ACHA Division II level. At the conclusion of the 2009–2010 season, Eastern Michigan University, Michigan–Dearborn, and Western Michigan University left to join the new Great Lakes Collegiate Hockey League. The CSCHL added Indiana University, who joins the league for the 2010–2011 season, after transitioning from ACHA II. Kent State departed for the GLCHL at the conclusion of the 2011–12 season.

Indiana University rejoined the Great Midwest Hockey League (GMHL) in the 2014–15 season to once again compete at the Division II level. During the 2019–20 season, Robert Morris Illinois merged with erstwhile non-hockey Roosevelt University. The hockey program was retained through the merger process of the universities and athletics departments and has played under the Roosevelt Lakers program beginning in the 2020-21 season. After the 2021–22 season, Lindenwood moved up its men's hockey team to NCAA Division I status and therefore left both the league and the ACHA.

Iowa State and the University of Illinois at Urbana-Champaign left for Midwest College Hockey following the conclusion of the 2023-24 season. Following the announcement, the conference folded.

== Current members ==
School	Location	Founded	Affiliation	Enrollment	Team nickname	Colors	Primary conference
Ohio University	Athens, OH	1804	Public	27,367	Bobcats		Mid-American (D-I)
Maryville University	St.Louis, MO	1872	Private	9,959	Saints		GLVC (D-II)

== Former teams ==
- Northeastern Illinois University folded hockey program
- University of Wisconsin–Milwaukee folded hockey program.
- Kent State University moved to GLCHL
- Eastern Michigan University moved to GLCHL
- University of Michigan–Dearborn moved to GLCHL
- Western Michigan University moved to GLCHL
- Saint Louis University dropped to ACHA Div II
- University of Wisconsin–Whitewater dropped to ACHA Div II
- University at Buffalo moved to ECHL
- Marquette University dropped to ACHA Div II
- University of Toledo dropped to ACHA Div II
- Purdue University dropped to ACHA Div II
- University of Minnesota dropped to ACHA Div II
- University of Notre Dame moved to NCAA Div I WCHA
- University of Alabama in Huntsville moved to NCAA Div II, now Div. I in WCHA
- Northwestern University dropped to ACHA Div II
- St. Norbert College moved to NCAA Div III Northern Collegiate Hockey Association
- University of Missouri dropped to ACHA Div II
- Illinois State University dropped to ACHA Div II
- University of Illinois at Chicago moved to NCAA Div I CCHA, folded hockey program.
- Chicago State University folded hockey program.
- Indiana University dropped to ACHA Div II
- Robert Morris University merged with Roosevelt University in 2020.
- Lindenwood University moved to NCAA Div I independent in 2022.
- Iowa State University left for Midwest College Hockey in 2024.
- University of Illinois at Urbana-Champaign left for Midwest College Hockey in 2024.

== Conference arenas ==
School	Hockey Arena	Capacity
Ohio	Ossian C. Bird Arena	2,000
Maryville	Maryville University Hockey Center	2,000
