= Blenda Wilson =

American academic administrator (1941–2026)

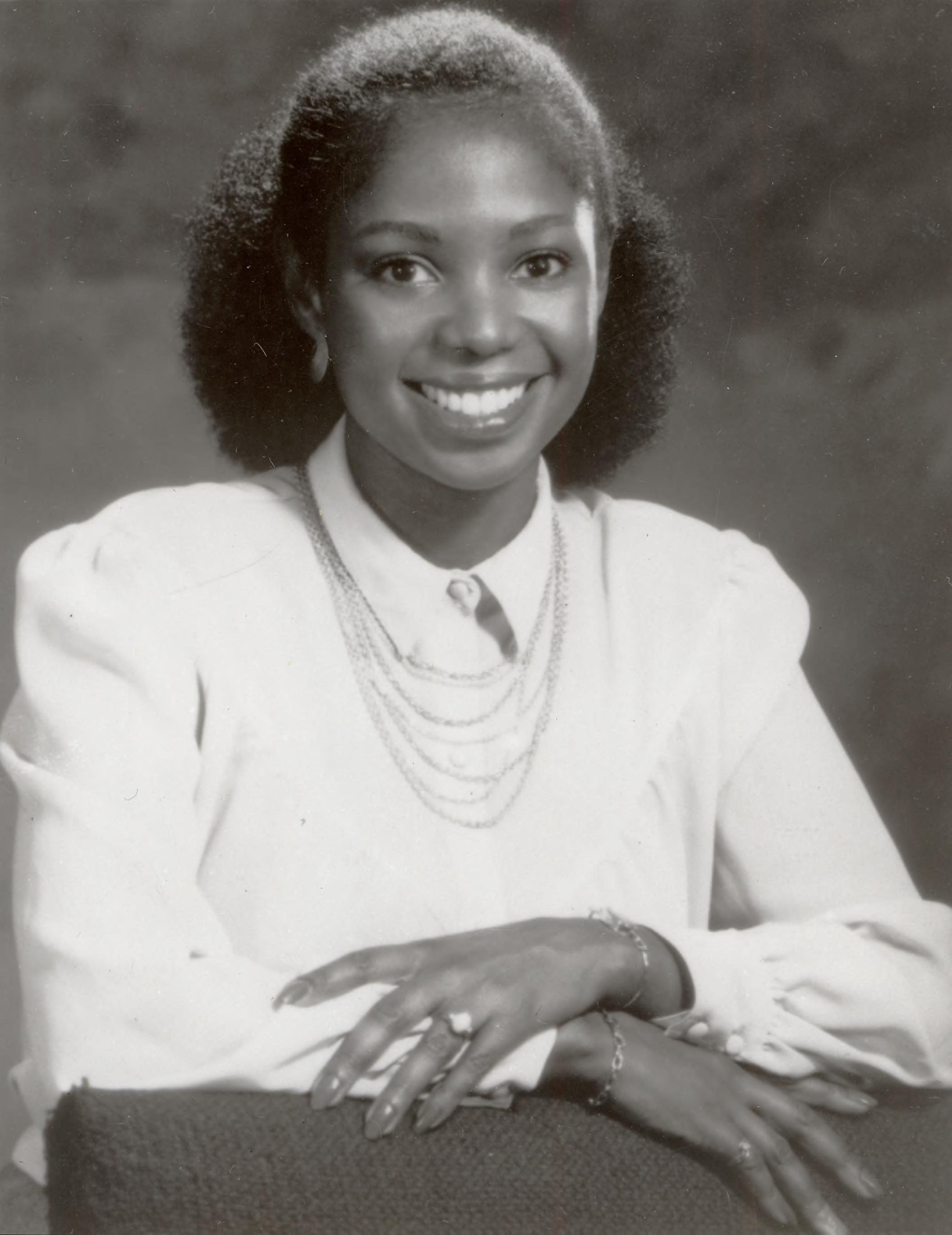
- Wilson in 1977

3rd President of California State University, Northridge
- In office September 1, 1992 – June 30, 1999
- Preceded by: James W. Cleary
- Succeeded by: Jolene Koester

3rd Chancellor of the University of Michigan–Dearborn
- In office July 1988 – August 1992
- Preceded by: William A. Jenkins
- Succeeded by: James C. Renick

Personal details
- Born: January 28, 1941 Perth Amboy, New Jersey, U.S.
- Died: June 4, 2026 (aged 85) Bridgewater, New Jersey, U.S.
- Spouse: Louis Fair Jr. (deceased 2021)
- Education: Cedar Crest College (BA); Seton Hall University (MA); Boston College (PhD)
- Profession: College administrator

Academic background
- Thesis: An analysis of goal congruence in a geographically dispersed university: Implications for the governance of Antioch University (1979)
- Doctoral advisor: Evan Collins

Academic work
- Discipline: Education
- Institutions: Rutgers University; Harvard University; University of Michigan-Dearborn; California State University, Northridge

Blenda Jacqueline Wilson (January 28, 1941 – June 4, 2026) was an American university administrator and educational executive who was the first African-American woman to become president of a large (over 25,000 students) American university. She was president of California State University, Northridge (CSUN) during the 1994 Northridge earthquake, one of the worst natural disasters in U.S. history. Wilson oversaw the rebuilding of CSUN over several years, costing nearly $400 million and repairing or rebuilding over 100 buildings on the campus.

== Early life and education ==
Blenda Jacqueline Wilson was born in Perth Amboy, New Jersey, on January 28, 1941. Her parents were Horace Lawrence Wilson and Margaret Brogsdale Wilson. She received her bachelor's degree from Cedar Crest College in Allentown, Pennsylvania, in 1962, her master's degree from Seton Hall University in South Orange, New Jersey, in 1965, and her Ph.D. from Boston College in 1979.

== Career ==
Wilson held a variety of administrative and executive positions at universities and non-profit organizations, including the Middlesex County, New Jersey Economic Opportunities Corporation, Rutgers University, Harvard University, Independent Sector, and the Colorado Commission on Higher Education). In 1988, she was appointed the first female chancellor at the University of Michigan-Dearborn.

=== California State Northridge ===
In 1992, Wilson was appointed the third president of California State University, Northridge (CSUN). She was the first woman and first African-American to hold the position. Wilson was the first African-American woman to become president of a large (over 25,000 students) American university.

Wilson was president of CSUN during the 1994 Northridge earthquake, one of the worst natural disasters in U.S. history. Wilson oversaw the $400 million rebuilding of the campus over several years, where 107 buildings were damaged or destroyed, making it at the time the most expensive natural disaster to impact a university in the United States.

While Wilson received local and national praise for her work in earthquake recovery at CSUN, she also was criticized for scandals that marred her presidency. During a time of severe budget cutbacks, she was criticized for planning faculty layoffs. She responded by telling the CSUN Faculty Senate that "This is not an employment agency, this is a university."

=== Nellie Mae Education Foundation ===
In 1999, Wilson was appointed president and chief executive officer of the Nellie Mae Education Foundation in Quincy, Massachusetts, where she served until 2006.

== Community service ==
Wilson served as a trustee for the Getty Foundation, the James Irvine Foundation, Boston College, Cambridge College, the College Board, and deputy chairman of the Federal Reserve Bank of Boston.

== Personal life and death ==
Wilson was married to Louis Fair, Jr. from 1985 until his death in 2021.

Wilson died in Bridgewater, New Jersey, on June 4, 2026, at the age of 85.
