= Om Prakash Galhotra =

Indian Police Service officer

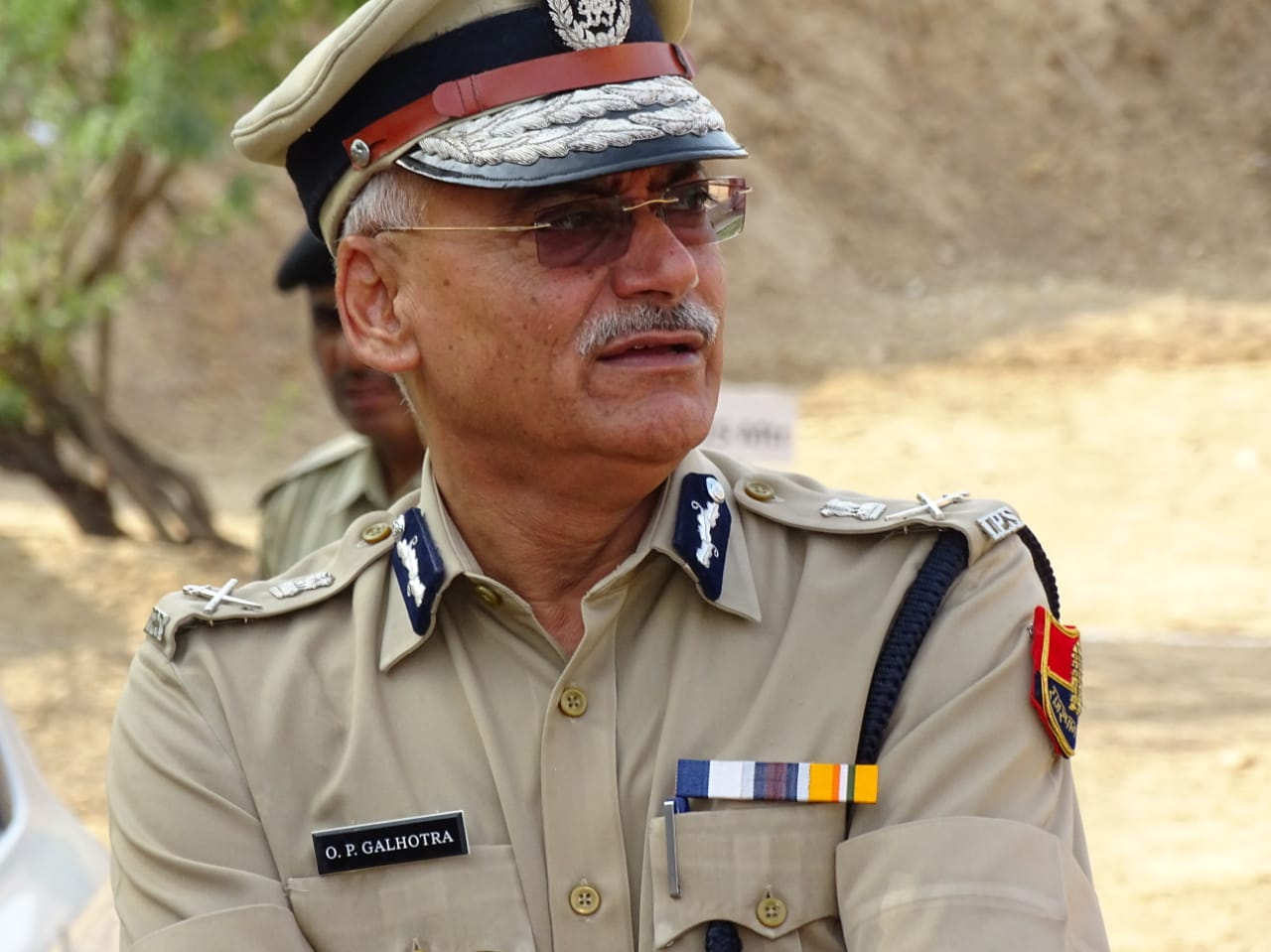
Galhotra in 2018

Om Prakash Galhotra is an Indian Police Service officer of the 1985 batch belonging to Rajasthan cadre. He served as the Director General of Police of Rajasthan from December 2017 to December 2018. As of December 2018, he is serving as the Director General of Home Guard in Rajasthan. His transfer in 2018 was allegedly in violation of the directions of the Supreme Court of India.

== Education ==
Galhotra is a chartered accountant by education. He holds an M.Phil. degree in National Security and Strategic Studies from University of Madras.

== Career ==
Starting his career in the Indian Police Service, he worked as Assistance Superintendent of Police, Kota City. Then he served as District Superintendent of Police of District Dholpur, Chittorgarh and Bharatpur in succession until June 1996 when he was posted to the Central Bureau of Investigation (CBI), New Delhi as a Superintendent of Police and later as Deputy Inspector General.

He was posted to Rajasthan in 2004 and worked as Inspector General of Police in Jaipur until 2008 when he started his second stint as Joint Director in the CBI, at Kolkata and Delhi.

Galhotra returned to Rajasthan in 2015 as Additional Director General of Police. He served as Director, Rajasthan Police Academy, Jaipur, followed by Additional Director General, Armed Battalions.

== Decorations ==
Galhotra was awarded the Police Medal for Meritorious Service (IPM) on the occasion of Independence Day 2001 and the President's Police Medal for Distinguished Service on Independence Day 2009.
