= University of Michigan–Dearborn =

Public university in Dearborn, Michigan, U.S.

Coordinates: 42°19′11″N 83°13′59.2″W

- Former names: Dearborn Center of the University of Michigan (1959–1963); Dearborn Campus of the University of Michigan (1963–1971)
- Motto: Arts, Knowledge, Truth
- Type: Public university
- Established: 1959
- Parent institution: University of Michigan Board of Regents
- Accreditation: HLC
- Academic affiliations: CUMU
- Endowment: $85.8 million (2023)
- Budget: $192 million (2022-23)
- Chancellor: Gabriella Scarlatta
- President: Domenico Grasso
- Provost: Ghassan Kridli (interim)
- Faculty: 511
- Students: 8,224
- Undergraduates: 6,117
- Postgraduates: 1,982
- Doctoral students: 125
- Location: Dearborn, Michigan, United States
- Campus: Suburban 200+ acres
- Newspaper: The Michigan Journal
- Colors: Maize & Blue
- Nickname: Wolverines
- Sporting affiliations: NAIA – WHAC
- Website: umdearborn.edu

The University of Michigan–Dearborn (UM-Dearborn) is a public research university in Dearborn, Michigan, United States. Founded in 1959 with a gift from the Ford Motor Company, it was initially known as the Dearborn Center, operating as a remote branch of the University of Michigan. Upon receiving its own accreditation in 1970, the branch became a fully-fledged university and adopted its current name; it is governed by the regents of the University of Michigan, but is otherwise operated separately from the University of Michigan in Ann Arbor.

The university is classified among "R2: Doctoral Universities – High research spending and doctorate production" in the Carnegie Classification of Institutions of Higher Education as of the 2025 update. Located in Metro Detroit, UM-Dearborn is also known for its community engagement within the region. Together with Oakland University, the University of Michigan-Flint, and Wayne State University, UM-Dearborn is one of the four Coalition of Urban and Metropolitan Universities (CUMU) members in the State of Michigan.

The university's athletic teams are the Michigan-Dearborn Wolverines. They primarily compete in the Wolverine–Hoosier Athletic Conference. The University of Michigan-Dearborn Fieldhouse, opened in 1978, serves as the home to the men's and women's basketball teams. Notable alumni include the former COO of Ford Motor Company Kumar Galhotra, former chair of the Michigan Republican Party Saul Anuzis, and former member of the Michigan House of Representatives George Darany.

== History ==
=== Dearborn Center of the University of Michigan ===
In the mid-1950s, Archie Pearson, the director of training at Ford Motor Company, conducted studies that revealed a looming shortage of college-educated engineers and junior administrators within the company's future workforce. As a result, Pearson discreetly reached out to higher education institutions in Metro Detroit, inquiring about their willingness to adapt their programs to align with the anticipated requirements of the automotive industry.

On December 17, 1956, the Ford Motor Company gifted both land and capital development funds to the Regents for the creation of a remote branch of the university offering upper-division undergraduate and master's level programs. In February 1957, the Regents of the University of Michigan officially accepted the gifts and committed to establishing a branch in Dearborn known as the Dearborn Center of the University of Michigan.

The Dearborn Center would also have a cooperative work-study requirement for its programs in business administration and engineering, which were intended to provide students with real-world experience that would increase their employment prospects. The University of Michigan in Ann Arbor would provide the necessary liberal arts and professional courses to complete a University of Michigan bachelor's or master's degree. Construction on the Dearborn Center began on May 22, 1958, and on October 1 of that year, William E. Stirton was appointed its first director.

The branch opened with an enrollment of 34 students on September 28, 1959. A liberal arts division and programs in electrical engineering and teacher education were added in fall 1960. The first 12 graduates on January 20, 1962. In 1963, the branch was renamed the Dearborn Campus of the University of Michigan, to emphasize that it was a free-standing unit of the university.

In May 1969, the Dearborn Campus Planning Study Committee released their report on the future of the institution, which recommended the addition of lower-division undergraduate courses and the expansion of non-cooperative programs. In November 1969, the regents formally approved the committee's recommendations.

=== Proposal for an independent "Fairlane University" ===
In February 1970, the Committee on Colleges and Universities of the Michigan House of Representatives discussed a bill to separate the Dearborn campus from the University of Michigan, proposing its establishment as an independent institution named "Fairlane University." This initiative, reflecting a national trend toward expanding higher education, faced strong opposition from faculty and students in Dearborn, leading to its eventual failure.

That year, Oakland University gained institutional independence from Michigan State University, evolving into an autonomous research university. Meanwhile, the Dearborn campus continued to grow under the policies of the Board of Regents of the University of Michigan, receiving independent accreditation in August 1970 and officially being renamed in April 1971. However, this continued affiliation with the University of Michigan would prevent this newly fledged university from having its own governing board.

This period of proposed restructuring was not unique to Michigan. In 1972, a similar process occurred in Virginia, where George Mason College was separated from the University of Virginia in Charlottesville and renamed George Mason University.

=== University of Michigan–Dearborn ===
==== Leonard E. Goodall (1971–1979) ====
In August 1970, the Dearborn campus received its first accreditation independent from the Ann Arbor campus, from the North Central Association of Colleges and Schools. In April 1971, the Regents renamed the institution as the University of Michigan–Dearborn (UM–Dearborn) and two months later appointed Leonard E. Goodall, the vice-chancellor of the University of Illinois at Chicago Circle, as UM–Dearborn's first chancellor, both effective July 1, 1971. In the Fall of 1971, the university officially became a four-year institution as it welcomed its first freshman class. There were 313 freshmen in that first class and overall enrollment grew by 50% to 1,369. University enrollment grew rapidly during the course of the decade, exceeding 6,000 in 1979. UM–Dearborn announced both a $19 million campus development plan and the creation of its Alumni Society in November 1973.

Between 1978 and 1980, three major new buildings were opened on campus: the Fieldhouse and Ice Arena, the University Library, and the University Mall. These additions caused the center of campus to shift south of UM–Dearborn's original four buildings.

==== William A. Jenkins (1980–1988) ====
In July 1980, University of Colorado Denver acting chancellor William A. Jenkins was named the second chancellor of UM–Dearborn. He soon faced a major financial crisis on campus that stemmed from a recession in the state, which resulted in a $500,000 cut from the university's base budget in April 1981. Also in 1981, history professor Sidney Bolkosky established the Holocaust Survivor Oral History Project at UM–Dearborn. In the fall of 1983, minority enrollment on campus reached a record high of 9.6%. The university received a 13.2% increase in its annual appropriation from the state legislature in 1984–85, which enabled it to restore the 3% salary raises that it had cut in 1981–82. In May 1986, UM–Dearborn opened its Armenian Research Center, the first university-affiliated institution of its kind.

==== Blenda J. Wilson (1988–1992) ====
In November 1988, Blenda Wilson was inaugurated as the third chancellor of UM–Dearborn. In September 1989, the university began its $11.6 million General Campus Renovation Project, entirely funded by the State of Michigan. In summer 1990, the university terminated its varsity ice hockey program, resulting in head coach Tom Anastos and athletic director Sid Fox announcing their departures from Dearborn. In October, Wilson announced that hockey would become a club sport and the university's basketball and women's volleyball teams would compete in the National Association of Intercollegiate Athletics (NAIA). In April 1991, graduate enrollment at UM–Dearborn exceeded 1,000 for the first time, and in July of that year revenue from tuition surpassed state appropriations. In May 1992, Wilson announced her resignation to take a position at California State University.

==== James C. Renick (1993–1999) ====
In January 1993, James C. Renick was inaugurated as the university's fourth chancellor. In fall 1995 and again in fall 1996, the university achieved new total enrollment records (8,214 and 8,324, respectively). In March 1997, UM–Dearborn inaugurated the first graduate program in its College of Arts, Sciences, & Letters (CASL), a Master of Arts in Liberal Studies degree. In March 1999, the university's FUTURES Planning Resource Council released its recommendation that UM–Dearborn's "top priority is being nationally regarded as an excellent regional university" and argued this should be achieved by "developing interdisciplinary centers of teaching and research excellence".

==== Daniel E. Little (2000–2018) ====
In November 2000, Daniel E. Little was inaugurated as the university's fifth chancellor. In 2001, both the Environmental Interpretive Center and the CASL Building were opened on campus. In fall of 2003, university enrollment topped 9,000 for the first time (9,022) and graduate enrollment reached 25% of total enrollment. In September of that year, the university acquired the Fairlane Training Center from Ford, located across Evergreen Road from its main campus, which it renamed the Fairlane Center in February 2004. In November 2003, the renovated University Center (formerly the University Mall) opened. In October 2006, UM–Dearborn dedicated its new Science Learning and Research Center. In November 2008, the Regents of the University of Michigan approved the first doctoral programs at UM–Dearborn, Doctor of Philosophy (Ph.D.) degrees in Automotive Systems Engineering and Information Systems Engineering, both to begin the following fall. In February 2009, the regents approved a Doctor of Education (Ed.D.) program. In May of that year, they announced the renaming of the School of Management as the College of Business. In 2008, Kiplinger ranked UM–Dearborn 86th nationally in its "Best Values in Public Colleges", while in 2009 U.S. News & World Report ranked it the fourth-best master's-level university in the Midwest.

In September 2013, The Union at Dearborn opened, with its 145 apartments providing the first on-campus student housing since the 1970s. Also that month, UM–Dearborn's School of Education was renamed the College of Education, Health and Human Services. In December 2015, UM–Dearborn conferred its 50,000 cumulative degree. In September 2016, the university's Natural Sciences Building reopened after a $51 million renovation. In April 2018, UM–Dearborn broke ground on a new, $90 million Engineering Lab Building. In 2018, Daniel E. Little resigned as chancellor.

==== Domenico Grasso (2018–2025) ====
In August 2018, Domenico Grasso was inaugurated as university's sixth chancellor. In May 2025, Domenico Grasso was selected to replace Santa J. Ono as the interim President of the University of Michigan-Ann Arbor. Gabriella Scarlatta, the provost and executive vice chancellor for academic affairs at UM-Dearborn, succeeded Grasso as interim chancellor.

== Campus ==
The UM–Dearborn campus is located on the former estate of Henry Ford. It is divided into several sections: The Henry Ford Estate, known as Fair Lane, The Fairlane Center, Main Campus, and the Early Childhood Education Center just south of campus. In addition, the university has over 70 acres (283,000 m^{2}) of nature preserve and a bird observatory, the Rouge River Bird Observatory, which has operated on campus since its founding in 1992, and is the longest-running, full-time urban bird research station in North America.

Main Campus includes the facilities for the College of Arts, Sciences, and Letters (CASL), the College of Engineering and Computer Science (CECS), the Environmental Interpretive Center, Administration, the Mardigian Library, the Institute for Advanced Vehicle Studies, the University Center, the Computing Building, and the Fieldhouse. Within both CASL and CECS, many different buildings house different programs, departments, research centers, student life centers, and academic resources.

Fair Lane and the nature preserve west of campus are along the Rouge River. There is a small waterfall, rose garden, meadow, a lake, and reflecting pond surrounded by acres of forest. The forest has many walking paths which connect the Environmental Interpretive Center, Henry Ford Community College, Downtown West Dearborn, Hines Drive, the university's Main Campus, and Fair Lane together. Fair Lane recently has been handed over to Edsel and Eleanor Ford House. The Edsel Ford Estate will put forth restoration efforts which will cost 50 million dollars or more. The majority of the funding will go towards full home restoration and grounds preservation. The project will open up rooms which had been unavailable to public tours before.

== Organization ==
=== Administration ===
UM-Dearborn, historically a branch of the University of Michigan, has operated under the policies of the Board of Regents of the University of Michigan since its accreditation in 1970. The Board of Regents, as the governing body, is responsible for the appointment of the university president, who presides over the Board's meetings but does not have voting rights. Instead of directly managing the university's operations, the university president recommends the appointment of a chancellor, who is subject to approval by the Board of Regents and is tasked with overseeing the day-to-day administrative duties of the university as its chief executive officer.

==== List of chancellors ====
- Leonard E. Goodall (July 1971 – June 1979)
- William A. Jenkins (July 1980 – June 1988)
- Blenda J. Wilson (July 1988 – August 1992)
- James C. Renick (January 1993 – July 1999)
  - Bernard W. Klein (July 1979 – June 1980 (acting), September – December 1992 (interim), July 1999 – June 2000 (interim))
- Daniel E. Little (July 2000 – July 2018)
- Domenico Grasso (August 2018 - May 2025)
  - Gabriella Scarlatta (May 2025 - present)

==== Faculty governance ====
The UM-Dearborn faculty governance comprises three bodies: the Faculty Congress, Faculty Senate, and Faculty Senate Council. The Faculty Senate's actions are effective unless revoked by the Faculty Congress. The campus has four representatives to the Senate Assembly, which has 77 members representing all three campuses.

=== Finances ===
The university's current (FY 2022–23) operating budget of $192 million has four major sources of funding: the General Fund ($165.41 million), the Expendable Restricted Funds ($24.91 million), the Auxiliary Funds ($1.25 million), and the Designated Funds ($500,000). The Office of Budget and Planning reports that student tuition and fees are the largest funding source, contributing $135.3 million to the General Fund, which accounts for 70.46% of the total operating budget. In the fiscal year 2022–23, the State of Michigan provided $28.18 million to the university, which represents 14.67% of its total operating budget. Revenue from government sponsored programs contributed $20.5 million to the Expendable Restricted Funds, accounting for 10.67% of the total operating budget.

=== Colleges ===
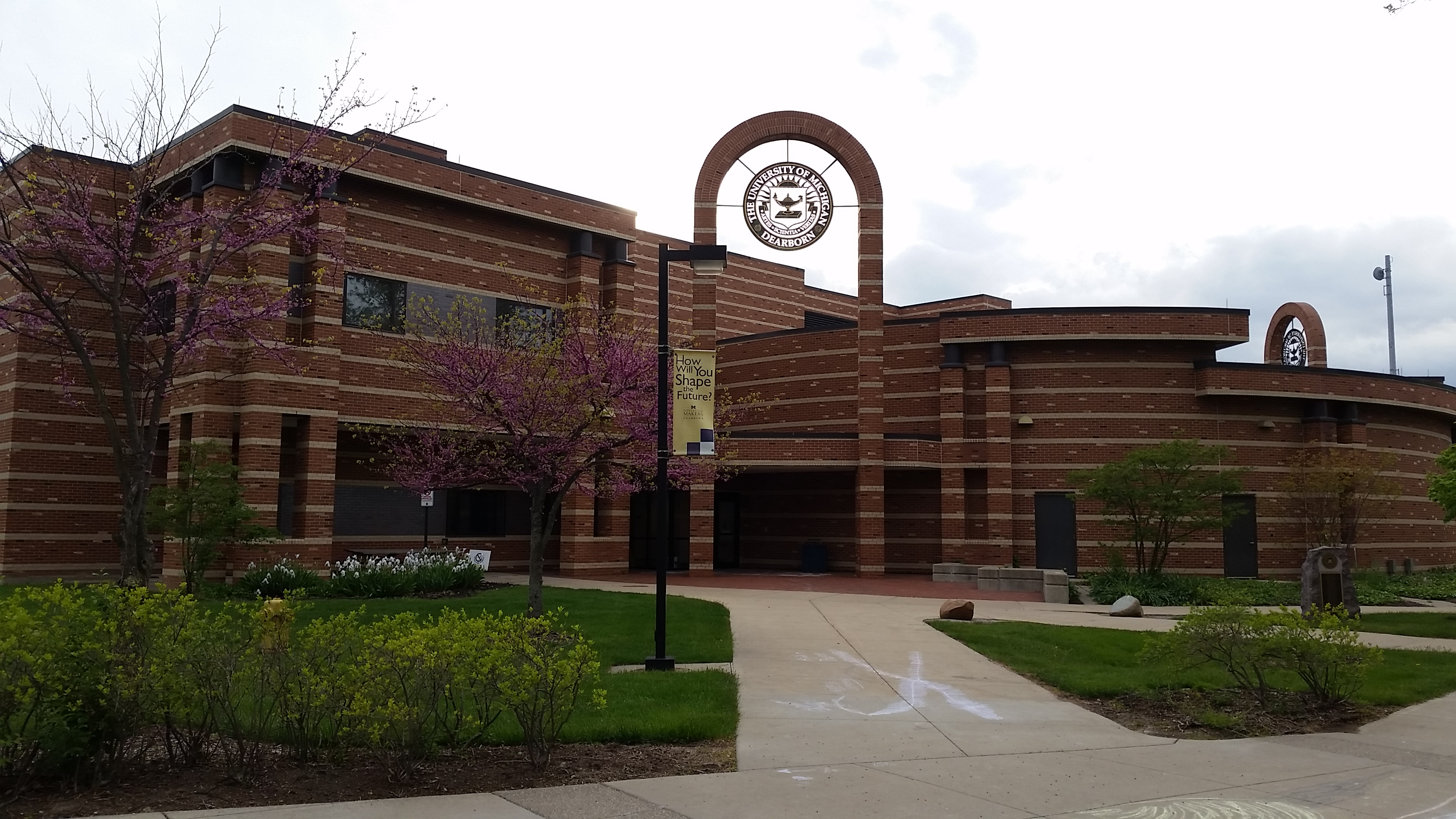
The university's seal on the Social Science Building (SSB) located at 4901 Evergreen Road

There are four colleges at UM-Dearborn: the College of Arts, Sciences, & Letters (CASL), the College of Engineering & Computer Science (CECS), the College of Business (COB), and the College of Education, Health, & Human Services (CEHHS).

The College of Arts, Sciences, and Letters (CASL), pronounced "castle," is home to five graduate programs, 32 undergraduate majors, and programs in environmental sciences, mathematics, applied statistics, physical sciences, religious diversity, cultural studies, health policy studies, health psychology, civic engagement, and leadership. CASL traces its origins to the establishment of the Literature, Science, and the Arts division in fall of 1960, which assumed its current name and college-level status in June 1973.

The main building houses the college's administrative offices and the departments of Behavioral Sciences, Mathematics and Statistics, Literature Philosophy Arts (LPA) and Language Culture and Communication (LCC). General purpose classrooms occupy the majority of the first level, along with the campus television studio. Several other programs, such as urban studies and criminal justice, are housed in different buildings spread across campus.

Engineering at UM–Dearborn dates to its first academic year, it was reorganized as the School of Engineering in June 1973, and it was renamed the College of Engineering and Computer Science in March 1998. The College of Engineering and Computer Science is home to eleven undergraduate degree programs and twelve graduate degree programs, including six doctoral programs (four Ph.D. and two D.Eng.), housed in CIS, ECE, ME, IMSE departments and college Interdisciplinary Programs. The College of Engineering and Computer Science offers four Ph.D. programs in collaboration with the Rackham Graduate School in Ann Arbor. These programs include:

- Ph.D. in Computer and Information Science
- Ph.D. in Electrical, Electronics, and Computer Engineering
- Ph.D. in Industrial and Systems Engineering
- Ph.D. in Mechanical Sciences and Engineering

The College of Business offers undergraduate and graduate programs. Business programs at UM–Dearborn were organized into the newly formed School of Management in June 1973, which was renamed the College of Business in July 2009.

The College of Education, Health, & Human Services (CEHHS) offers undergraduate, master's, and doctoral programs. It also offers certificate programs for future and current teachers and opportunities for its students in the Early Childhood Education Center (ECEC). The Teacher Education program at UM–Dearborn dates to the fall of 1960, it was reorganized as the Division of Education in June 1973, and it was upgraded to the School of Education in March 1987.

College/school	Year founded	Enrollment (FA 2023)	General Fund Budget ($, 2022-23)	Budget per student ($, 2022-23)
College of Arts, Sciences, & Letters	1973	2,488	29,418,943	11,824
College of Business	1973	1,677	15,250,141	9,094
College of Education, Health, & Human Services	1987	917	5,813,633	6,340
College of Engineering and Computer Science	1973	3,960	24,434,227	6,170
University of Michigan–Dearborn*	–	9,304	165,411,700	17,779
*included other standalone units

== Academics ==
=== Undergraduate admissions ===
Undergraduate admission statistics of the University of Michigan–Dearborn
	2024	2023	2022	2021	2020
First-time fall freshmen
Applicants	14,105	12,373	12,024	8,065	7,300
Admits	7,844	7,254	6,506	5,546	4,928
Admit rate	55.6	58.6	54.1	68.8	67.5
Enrolled	1,114	1,160	1,005	1,084	1,003
Yield rate	14.2	16.0	15.4	19.5	20.4
SAT composite* (out of 1600)	990-1250	1120-1520	1140-1460 (56%^{†})	1050-1300 (58%^{†})	1120-1350 (92%^{†})
ACT composite* (out of 36)	24-29	23-30	22-28 (5%^{†})	22-28 (7%^{†})	22-29 (21%^{†})
Fall transfers
Applicants	1,950	1,731	1,665	–	–
Admits	950	954	942	–	–
Admit rate	48.7	55.1	56.6	–	–
Enrolled	531	516	482	–	–
Yield	55.9	54.1	51.2	–	–
* middle 50% range^{†} percentage of first-time freshmen who chose to submit

The 2022 annual ranking of U.S. News & World Report categorizes UM-Dearborn as "selective". For the Class of 2025 (enrolled fall 2021), UM-Dearborn received 8,065 applications and accepted 5,546 (68.8%). Of those accepted, 1,084 enrolled, a yield of 19.5%.

The enrolled first-year class of 2025 had the following standardized test scores: the middle 50% range (25th percentile-75th percentile) of SAT scores was 1050-1300, while the middle 50% range of ACT scores was 22-28.

=== Undergraduate graduation and retention ===
UM-Dearborn's freshman retention rate is 83.52%, with 54.6% going on to graduate within six years. The eight-year graduation rate at UM-Dearborn is 58%, with a withdrawal rate of 15%. For Pell Grant recipients, who make up nearly half of the undergraduate population, the graduation and withdrawal rates are 56% and 18%, respectively.

=== Programs and employment outcomes ===
Academic rankings

Regional
- U.S. News & World Report: 17

USNWR undergraduate rankings
Best Colleges for Veterans	5
Engineering	167
Top Performers on Social Mobility	13

The university offers nine ABET-accredited engineering bachelor degree programs. These programs cover the following areas of study: bioengineering, computer and information science, computer engineering, electrical engineering, industrial and systems engineering, manufacturing engineering, mechanical engineering, robotics engineering, and software engineering.

Its most popular undergraduate majors, by 2021 graduates, were psychology (151), electrical and electronics engineering (136), mechanical engineering (117), biology/biological sciences (109), computer and information science (69), and public health education and promotion (68).

The U.S. Department of Education reports that as of 2024, federally aided students attending UM-Dearborn 10 years after they began their studies had a median annual income of $59,649 (based on 2020-2021 earnings adjusted to 2022 dollars), which exceeds both the midpoint for 4-year schools of $53,617 and U.S. real median personal income of $40,460 for the year 2021 adjusted to 2022 dollars.

The highest-earning (median) fields of study for federally aided students include:

- Electrical, Electronics and Communications Engineering - Master's Degree ($142,830/yr)
- Business Administration, Management and Operations - Master's Degree ($128,921/yr)

The five highest-earning (median) undergraduate fields of study for federally aided students at UM-Dearborn are:

- Computer Programming - Bachelor's Degree ($117,020/yr)
- Electrical, Electronics and Communications Engineering - Bachelor's Degree ($106,893/yr)
- Mechanical Engineering - Bachelor's Degree ($99,846/yr)
- Computer and Information Sciences, General - Bachelor's Degree ($99,124/yr)
- Computer Engineering - Bachelor's Degree ($99,036/yr)

== Athletics ==
The university's athletic teams are called the Wolverines (or Michigan-Dearborn Wolverines). Its colors are maize and blue. The teams share the nickname "Wolverines" with several other collegiate athletic teams, such as the Michigan Wolverines, the Michigan–Flint Wolverines, the Utah Valley Wolverines, the Morris Brown Wolverines, and the Grove City Wolverines.

The university is a member of the National Association of Intercollegiate Athletics (NAIA), primarily competing in the Wolverine–Hoosier Athletic Conference (WHAC) since the 2004–05 academic year.

UM–Dearborn competes in 16 intercollegiate varsity sports: Men's sports include baseball, basketball, bowling, cross country, golf, ice hockey, lacrosse and soccer; while women's sports include basketball, bowling, cross country, golf, ice hockey, soccer, softball and volleyball. Men's and women's bowling, along with women's ice hockey were added during the 2018–19 academic year.

=== Accomplishments ===
The softball team and men's ice hockey team were named WHAC champions respectively in 2017 and 2019. The men's basketball team was named WHAC tournament champions in 2018.

=== History ===
UM–Dearborn began varsity athletic competition in fall of 1974, with its soccer program. Beginning in 1977, the athletics teams were known as the Wolves. Its athletics program was substantially reformed in October 1990, with basketball and women's volleyball becoming NAIA sports and hockey being downgraded to club sport status.

=== Facilities ===
The University of Michigan-Dearborn Fieldhouse serves as the home to many of the athletic and recreational activities on campus. It was opened in fall of 1978. The venue hosts home contests for men's and women's basketball, ice hockey, and volleyball. A new hardwood floor was installed in the gymnasium during the summer of 2016.

=== Championships ===
- 1980 – Men's Ice Hockey (runner-up) – NAIA
- 1983 – Men's Ice Hockey (runner-up) – NAIA
- 1984 – Men's Ice Hockey (runner-up) – NAIA
- 1992 - Men's Ice Hockey Conference Champions - CSCHL
- 1992 – Men's Ice Hockey (runner-up) – ACHA Division I
- 1993 - Men's Ice Hockey Conference Champions - CSCHL
- 1998 - Men's Ice Hockey Conference Champions - CSCHL
- 1998 - Men's Ice Hockey Conference Tournament Champions - CSCHL
- 1999 - Men's Ice Hockey Conference Champions - CSCHL
- 2008 - Men's Rugby State Champions Div II Tier II
- 2016 - Men's Ice Hockey Conference Tournament Champions - GLCHL
- 2017 - Men's Ice Hockey Conference Tournament Champions - GLCHL
- 2017 - Softball Conference Champions - WHAC
- 2018 - Men's Basketball Conference Tournament Champions - WHAC
- 2018 - Men's Basketball - NAIA Division 2 National Tournament Appearance
- 2019 - Men's Ice Hockey Conference Champions - WHAC

== Student life ==
There are over 125 recognized student organizations (RSOs) and 9 university sponsored organizations (USOs). Both the RSO and USO communities consist of interests such as: Greek Life, Academic/Professional Organizations, Cultural and Ethnic Organizations, Honor Societies, Political and Social Activist Organizations, Recreational Organizations, and Religious and Spiritual Organizations.

University-sponsored organizations include:

- The Michigan Journal, the student newspaper of the University of Michigan–Dearborn since 1971.
- WUMD, the student radio station of the University of Michigan–Dearborn since 1979.
- Campus Video Network
- Greek Leadership Council
- The Lyceum
- Student Activities Board
- Student Government
- Student Organization Advisory Council (SOAC)
- The Wolf Pack

WUMD College Radio is a student-run, free-format radio station that features diversity in music from punk rock to bluegrass, jazz to electronica, and everything in between. Starting in 2007, the station began live broadcasts of UM-Dearborn sporting events.

=== Student body ===
As of 2022, the university has an enrollment of 8,224 students. 94% of students are from Michigan. Nearly half of its student body are first-generation college students. The average grade point averages for incoming high school students was a 3.68.

About half of UM-Dearborn's students enter directly from high school; the remainder are students who have prior college experience either immediately before entering UM-Dearborn or at some earlier point in their lives and careers.

== Notable people ==
=== Faculty ===
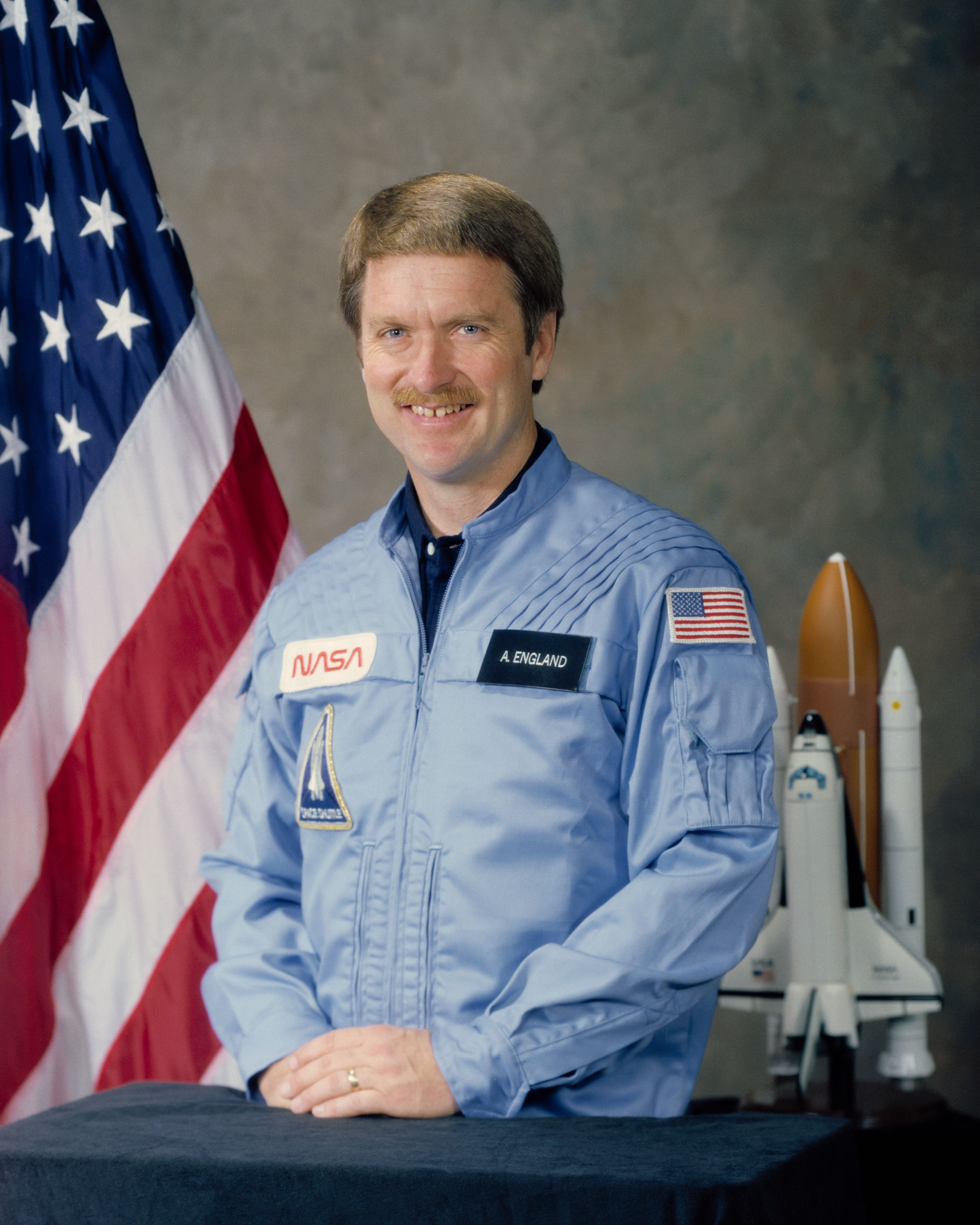
Anthony W. England, former dean of the university's College of Engineering and Computer Science and the namesake of the Tony England Engineering Lab Building

- Anthony W. England - former dean

=== Alumni ===
- Ismael Ahmed – director of the Michigan Department of Human Services
- Saul Anuzis – chairman of the Michigan Republican Party
- Mark Atkinson – one of the world's top diabetes researchers
- Susy Avery – former chair of the Michigan Republican Party
- Claire-Marie Brisson – academic, podcaster, and Harvard University faculty
- Ted Casteel – owner of Bethel Heights Vineyard in the Willamette Valley of Oregon
- George Darany – former member of the Michigan House of Representatives
- James R. Downing - President and CEO of St. Jude Children's Research Hospital
- Rima Fakih – model, actress, and Miss USA 2010 winner
- Kimberly Frost – novelist
- Kumar Galhotra – president of Ford North America
- Pamela Good - Co-founder and CEO of "Beyond Basics, a nonprofit organization that provides literacy interventions to students across the state of Michigan.
- Rudy Hatfield – professional basketball player of Barangay Ginebra Kings in the PBA
- Fadwa Hammoud – Solicitor General of Michigan
- Ian Hornak (1944–2002) – founding artist of the hyperrealist and photorealist fine art movements
- Hala Y. Jarbou – United States federal judge for the Western District of Michigan
- Jewell Jones – member of the Michigan House of Representatives
- Huda Kattan – makeup artist, beauty blogger, and founder of cosmetics line Huda Beauty
- Mary Beth Kelly – former Michigan Supreme Court Justice
- Paul S. Kemp – novelist
- David Knezek – former member of the Michigan Senate
- Lesia Liss – former member of the Michigan House of Representatives
- Trevor Rosen – member of award-winning country music act Old Dominion
- Soony Saad – Lebanese footballer Dearborn High School Graduate. Michigan's Gatorade Player of the Year.
- Jason Schmitt – journalist and academic
- Ece Yaprak – computer engineer and engineering educator

== Sources ==
- Higgs, Elton D. (1985). A Gift Renewed: The First 25 Years of the University of Michigan-Dearborn, 1959-1984. University of Michigan-Dearborn. ISBN 978-0-9336-9100-1.
- Higgs, Elton D.; Bolling, G. Fredric (2013). The Gift Matured: A Review of the University of Michigan-Dearborn for its 50th Anniversary. University of Michigan-Dearborn. ISBN 978-0-9336-9121-6.
