= Kumar Galhotra =

Indian-American entrepreneur (born 1965)

Kumar Galhotra (born December 1965) is an Indian-American businessman, widely known as the chief operating officer of Ford Motor Company.

Previously Galhotra led Ford Blue, Ford's internal-combustion business and prior to that served as the group vice president and president of Ford North America, from March 1, 2018. From 2014-2018, Galhotra was the group vice president of Lincoln and chief marketing officer for Ford Motor Company (2017-2018). Previously he was Vice-President of Engineering at Ford Motor Co. He joined Ford in 2012 having worked for Mazda in Japan.

Galhotra completed his education at the University of Michigan–Dearborn, where he gained a bachelor of science in mechanical engineering.
