= Ece Yaprak =

American engineering educator

Ece Tadik Yaprak
- Education: University of Michigan–Dearborn; Wayne State University
- Occupations: Computer engineer, professor

Ece Tadik Yaprak is an American computer engineer and engineering educator. She is a professor of engineering technology at Wayne State University in Detroit, Michigan where she chairs the Engineering Technology Division of the College of Engineering.

== Education and career ==
Yaprak is the daughter of Kevser and Muhiddin Tadik; her mother, Kevser, was a mathematics tutor. Their family emigrated from Turkey to the US in the early to mid 1970s.

Yaprak majored in electrical engineering at the University of Michigan–Dearborn, graduating in 1980, and began working professionally for General Electric. Returning to graduate study in computer engineering at Wayne State University, she received a master's degree in 1984, and then worked for the Ford Motor Company before completing her Ph.D. in 1989.

== Career and later life ==
Yaprak returned to Wayne State as a faculty member in 1993. She became chair of the Engineering Technology Division in 2017.

Her involvement in engineering accreditation begain in 2002. From 2010 to 2012 she chaired the IEEE Committee on Engineering Technology Accreditation Activities. She was a program director in the National Science Foundation Division of Undergraduate Education from 2015 to 2017. In 2023, she was elected to the board of directors of ABET.

== Recognition ==
Yaprak was named to the 2025 class of IEEE Fellows "for leadership in engineering technology accreditation and education".
