= Rochester Christian University =

Private university in Rochester Hills, Michigan, US

Coordinates: 42°40′02″N 83°08′43″W

- Former names: North Central Christian College (1959–1961); Michigan Christian College (1961–1997); Rochester College (1997–2019); Rochester University (2019–2024)
- Type: Private college
- Established: 1959
- Religious affiliation: Churches of Christ
- President: Reggies Wenyika
- Students: 1,167
- Undergraduates: 1,140
- Postgraduates: 27
- Location: Rochester Hills, Michigan, U.S.
- Campus: 85 acres (34 ha); Suburban
- Colors: Crimson & White
- Nickname: Warriors
- Sporting affiliations: NAIA – WHAC
- Website: rcu.edu

Rochester Christian University, legally Rochester University from 2019 to 2024, is a private Christian college in Rochester Hills, Michigan, United States. It was founded by members of the Churches of Christ in 1959.

Rochester Christian University is primarily undergraduate-focused and offers some graduate programs, such as a Master of Religious Education program. It also offers a degree completion program for adult students.

== History ==
In 1954, members of the Churches of Christ formed a board of trustees to establish an educational institution in the North Central region of the United States. After months of consideration, the board decided to establish a liberal arts college and purchased a country estate in Rochester Hills, Michigan, for a campus site. In September 1959, the college opened as North Central Christian College, retaining that name until 1961.

In the years that followed, the institution operated under the name of Michigan Christian College. In 1997, the board adopted the name Rochester College to more clearly portray the institution's nature as a liberal arts college in a Christian setting. The campus has grown to exceed 74 acres (30 ha).

In 2019, the institution's name was changed to Rochester University. Four years later, the University of Rochester sued for trademark infringement, alleging that the name Rochester University caused confusion. The university changed its name to Rochester Christian University in 2024 after "an amicable resolution with the University of Rochester concerning this matter".

== Academics ==
Undergraduate admissions statistics
- 2020 entering class
- Admit rate: 99.4 (527 out of 530)
- Yield rate: 37.2 (196 out of 527)

Test scores middle 50%^{[i]}
- SAT Total: 840-1050 (among 77% of FTFs)
- ACT Composite: 17-23 (among 15% of FTFs)

Rochester Christian University's most popular majors, by 2021 graduates, were:

Early Childhood Education and Teaching (67)
Mass Communication/Media Studies (23)
Psychology (23)
Business Administration and Management (18)
Organizational Leadership (18)

== Athletics ==
Rochester Christian University's athletic teams are the Warriors. The university is a member of the National Association of Intercollegiate Athletics (NAIA), primarily competing in the Wolverine–Hoosier Athletic Conference (WHAC) since the 2017–18 academic year; although they had competed as an associate member for baseball during the 2016–17 school year prior to apply for full membership. The Warriors previously competed as an NAIA Independent within the Association of Independent Institutions (AII) from 2011–12 to 2016–17. Its men's wrestling team competed in the Sooner Athletic Conference (SAC) from 2018–19 to 2019–20.

Prior to joining the NAIA, they were also a member of the United States Collegiate Athletic Association (USCAA), previously called the National Small College Athletic Association (NSCAA) prior to that, in which the college won a combined eight national championships.

Rochester Christian University competes in 24 intercollegiate varsity sports. Men's sports include, baseball, basketball, bowling, cross country, golf, ice hockey, soccer, track & field (indoor and outdoor), volleyball and wrestling; women's sports include basketball, bowling, cross country, golf, lacrosse, soccer, softball, track & field (indoor and outdoor) and volleyball; and co-ed sports include competitive cheer and esports.
