= Davenport University =

Private university in Michigan, US

- Former names: Grand Rapids Business College (1866–1918); Davenport Business Institute (1918–1924); Davenport-McLachlan Institute (1924–1964); Davenport College (1964–2000)
- Motto: "Get where the world is going" On seal: Percipio, Vivo, Ministro (Latin)
- Motto in English: "Perceive, Live, Minister"
- Type: Private university
- Established: 1866; 160 years ago
- Accreditation: HLC
- Endowment: $34.0 million (2025)
- President: Anthony Anderson (Interim)
- Provost: Gilda Gely
- Faculty: 311 (2024)
- Students: 4,815
- Undergraduates: 3,741
- Postgraduates: 1,074
- Location: Grand Rapids, Michigan, United States; 42.8498°N 85.5307°W
- Campus: 69 acres (0.28 km^{2}); Large suburb
- Other campuses: Belleville; Detroit; Holland; Kalamazoo; Lansing; Midland; Traverse City; Warren
- Colors: Red and black
- Nickname: Panthers
- Sporting affiliations: NCAA Division II – GLIAC; NCA; NDA; NACE; MRU; GLCHL
- Mascot: Pounce
- Website: davenport.edu
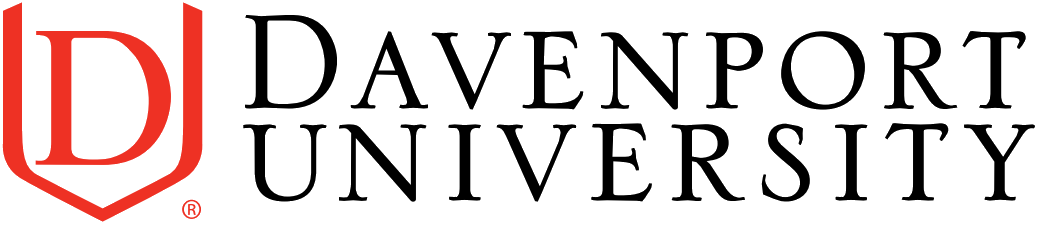

Davenport University is a private university with campuses throughout Michigan and online. It was founded in 1866 by Conrad Swensburg and currently offers associate, bachelor's, and master's degrees; diplomas; and post-grad certification programs in business, technology, health professions, and graduate studies (MBA).

Davenport's W.A. Lettinga Main Campus is in Grand Rapids, Michigan. The main campus includes student organizations, residence halls, and athletic programs.

== History ==
The predecessor to the modern Davenport University was founded in 1866 by Conrad G. Swensburg, a Union Army Veteran who returned to Michigan from the Civil War. The college, located in downtown Grand Rapids, opened with sixteen students as the Grand Rapids Business College on January 25, 1866. The college offered courses in various office skills, such as bookkeeping, penmanship, business law, and arithmetic.

The college operated under various names and in several locations in Grand Rapids throughout its early history. By 1910, the college was on the verge of closing. Michael E. Davenport, a new teacher at the school, reinvigorated the remaining staff and eventually took over the school's leadership in an attempt to revive it.

The school gained accreditation from the Higher Learning Commission - North Central Association of Colleges and Schools in 1976 and grew rapidly during the mid- to late 1900s and expanded with campus locations across Michigan.

== Campus ==
Davenport University's W.A. Lettinga Main Campus is located in Grand Rapids. The campus contains three academic buildings, a field house/student activities center, two suite-style residence halls, and one traditional-style residence hall with a full cafeteria.

The Richard M. DeVos and Jay Van Andel Academic Center is the main academic building on the campus. The 140,000 sq ft (13,000 m^{2}) building was complete in 2005 at the cost of $23 million. It includes classroom and technology space and was constructed to look like a large office building in concert with Davenport University's focus on business, technology, and health degrees. The facility includes academic advising, career services, and university offices, the campus bookstore and spirit shop, a café and dining location, the Margaret D. Sneden Library.

The Robert W. Sneden Center, completed in 2010, is an $8.5 million 41,000 sq ft (3,800 m^{2}) academic and arts extension connecting to the existing DeVos and Van Andel Academic Center. The extension features additional classroom and technology space, faculty office space, and a modern 220-seat auditorium.

The Donald W. Maine Business Building is a business building designed to incorporate multi-media technology. The Donald W. Maine College of Business building will be more than 60,000 square feet. A new Entrepreneurial Center will provide individuals seeking to start and grow businesses in West Michigan opportunities to consult with professionals at each stage in the process.

The Student Center opened in 2008 and became the fourth LEED certified building on the main DU campus. The 87,000 sq ft (8,100 m^{2}) facility houses meeting rooms, student social areas, Student Life Office, Student Center Café, a third on-campus dining area, fitness center with indoor rock climbing wall and suspended running track, and indoor basketball and volleyball court. The Field House is connected to the Student Center and is a 1,500-seat arena that serves as the home for DU Panthers men's & women's basketball and women's volleyball teams.

Beginning with the 2017–18 academic year, Davenport is a member of the Great Lakes Intercollegiate Athletic Conference (GLIAC) and NCAA Division II. In addition to national team championships in competitive cheer, hockey, lacrosse, rugby and soccer, plus individual championships in track & field, Davenport's men's and women's teams include baseball, basketball, cross country, dance, football, golf, softball, tennis, volleyball and wrestling.

=== Residence halls ===
In recent years DU has undergone a transition from a commuter and online business school to include characteristics of a traditional university. The school has increased its athletic program, athletic facilities, and student life facilities. Davenport currently has three residence halls on the main campus, with an off-campus apartment complex.

Peter C. and Pat Cook Residence Hall or Cook Hall was the first residence hall constructed on campus; it is a four-story apartment-living style residence hall named for long-time donors Peter and Pat Cook. Fred and Lena Meijer Residence Hall is a five-story residence hall on the DU campus, and offers apartment-living style rooms for on campus students much like Cook Hall. South Residence Hall is a four-story residence hall that offers traditional dorm-style living. South Hall is the residence hall for freshman students living on campus. The hall also includes a large dining area. One off-campus apartment complex is called Panther Woods, and features four buildings. The other off-campus apartment complex is called Panther Ridge and features three buildings.

=== Farmers Insurance Athletic Complex ===
Built near the W.A. Lettinga Main Campus, Davenport University's Farmers Insurance Athletic Complex was dedicated in March 2013. It features home fields for the school's baseball and softball programs as well as eight courts for the school's tennis programs. In 2016, Davenport finished building an outdoor facility hosting a new football stadium, soccer field, and nine-lane track and field complex. Along with this facility came an athletic support building housing new athletic offices, training room, locker rooms, and weight room.

=== Regional campuses ===
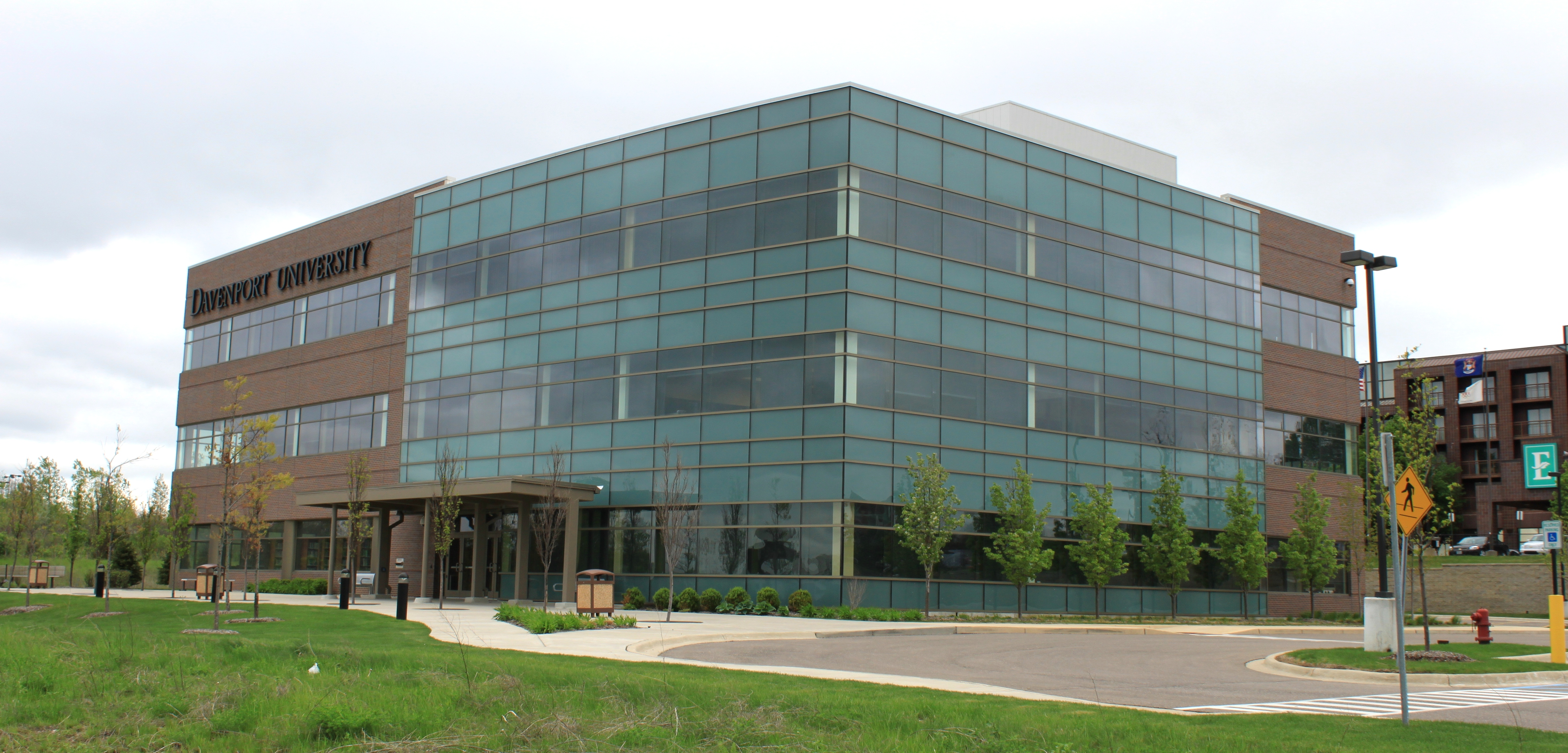
Davenport University Livonia campus

In addition to the main campus, Davenport University offers classes at other locations throughout Michigan including a main Campus in Grand Rapids; institutional campuses in Lansing, Midland, and Warren; as well as University Center locations at Kalamazoo Valley Community College (Kalamazoo) and Northwestern Michigan College (Traverse City).

== Academics ==
Academic rankings

Master's
- Washington Monthly: 529

Regional
- U.S. News & World Report: 122

National
- Forbes: Not Ranked
- U.S. News & World Report: Not Ranked
- Washington Monthly: Not Ranked

The university offers more than 50 areas of study and confers associate degrees, bachelor's degrees and master's degrees through its five colleges at its main campus, extension locations and online:

- The College of Arts and Sciences
- The College of Health Professions
- The College of Technology
- The College of Urban Education
- The Donald W. Maine College of Business

The university has a student-faculty ratio of 14:1 and an acceptance rate of 82%. Davenport specializes in business majors, with the Business Administration and Management program being the most popular major, with close to 20% of enrolled undergraduate students. Other popular majors include Accounting, Business/Commerce, Marketing/Marketing Management, and Human Resources Management.

The university is classified among "Master's Colleges & Universities: Larger Programs". It was ranked 95th in "Regional Universities Midwest" by U.S. News & World Report in their 2023 rankings. DU is accredited by the Higher Learning Commission (HLC).

== Athletics ==
The Davenport athletic teams are called the Panthers. The university is a member of the Division II level of the National Collegiate Athletic Association (NCAA), primarily competing in the Great Lakes Intercollegiate Athletic Conference (GLIAC) for most of its sports as a provisional member since the 2017–18 academic year (achieving D-II full member status in 2019–20). The Panthers previously competed in the Wolverine–Hoosier Athletic Conference (WHAC) of the National Association of Intercollegiate Athletics (NAIA) from 2005–16 to 2016–17.

Davenport competes in 21 intercollegiate varsity sports and 21 non-varsity sports: Men's sports include baseball, basketball, cross country, football, golf, lacrosse, soccer, swimming & diving, tennis, track & field and wrestling; while women's sports include basketball, cross country, golf, lacrosse, soccer, softball, swimming & diving, tennis, track & field and volleyball. Non-varsity men's sports include bowling, esports, ice hockey (ACHA DI, DII & DIII), marching band, pep band, rugby and volleyball; while non-varsity women's sports include bowling, cheerleading (NCA & sideline), dance, esports, ice hockey (ACHA DI), marching band, pep band, pompon, rugby, stunt and wrestling.

Women's lacrosse is a member of the Great Lakes Intercollegiate Athletic Conference (GLIAC), while men's lacrosse is a member of the Division II ranks of the (G-MAC) as of 2024 -25. Previously, members of Men's Collegiate Lacrosse Association

=== Other affiliations ===
Men's rugby competes at the Division I level of USA Rugby's Midwest Rugby Union. Men's ice hockey competes in the ACHA Division I within the Great Lakes Collegiate Hockey League (GLCHL), and a second hockey team competes in the Michigan Collegiate Hockey Conference (MCHC) at the ACHA DIII level. Davenport also has one of the most successful collegiate esport programs, fielding teams in popular titles like Counter-strike: Global Offensive, League of Legends, and Call of Duty.

== Notable alumni ==
- Paul Bissonnette – professional hockey player
- JP Eloff – professional rugby player
- Ikenna Ihim – internist and philanthropist
- Angus MacLellan – professional rugby player
- Glenn Steil Sr. – politician
- Grant Wolfram – professional baseball player
