= Wolverine–Hoosier Athletic Conference =

American collegiate athletic conference

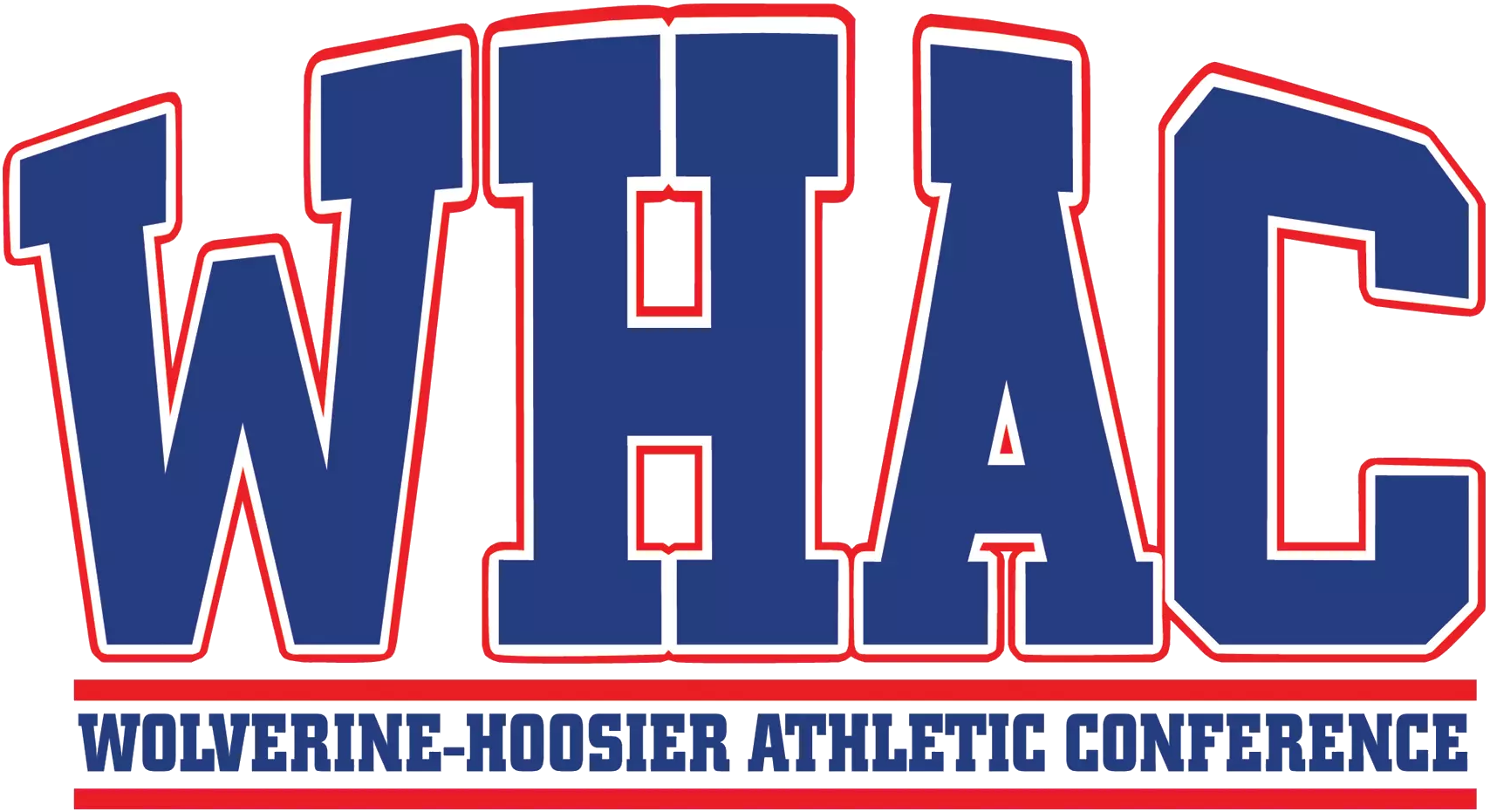
- Association: NAIA
- Founded: 1992; 34 years ago
- Commissioner: Eric Ward
- Sports fielded: 27; men's: 14; women's: 13
- No. of teams: 10
- Headquarters: Livonia, Michigan
- Region: Midwest (East North Central)
- Website: whac.net

Locations
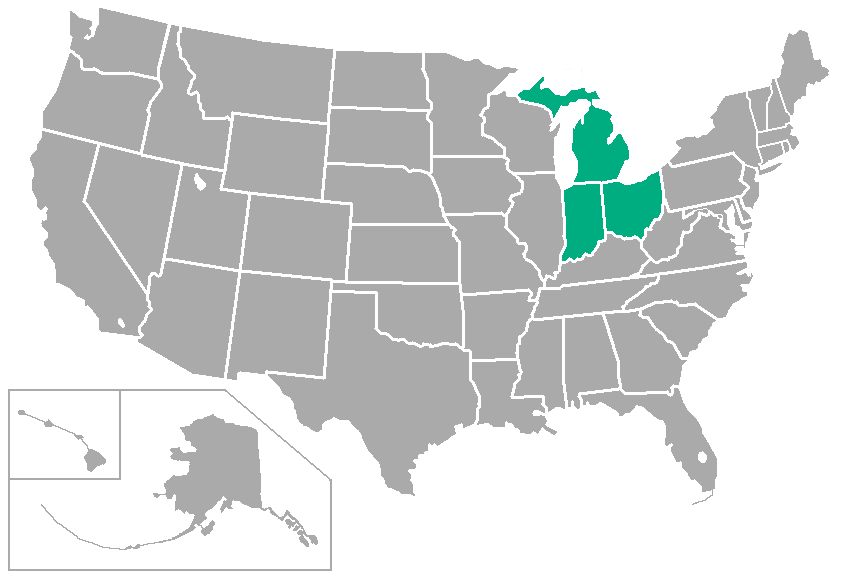

The Wolverine–Hoosier Athletic Conference (WHAC) is a college athletic conference affiliated with the National Association of Intercollegiate Athletics (NAIA), headquartered in Livonia, Michigan. The conference consists of ten colleges and universities located in the U.S. states of Michigan, Indiana, and Ohio. Founded in 1992, the conference was created as a successor group for the now-defunct NAIA District 23.

== History ==
Wolverine–Hoosier Athletic Conference
Location of WHAC members: full member

The WHAC announced on January 27, 2012, added bowling and lacrosse for both men and women as conference sports effective the fall of 2012, becoming the first NAIA conference to offer championships in these sports.

Men's ice hockey was added as a conference sport effective the fall of 2017, making the WHAC the first conference in the NAIA to offer ice hockey as a conference championship sport. Initially, the five conference members that sponsor ice hockey will participate in a conference championship.

=== Chronological timeline ===
- 1992 – The Wolverine–Hoosier Athletic Conference (WHAC) was founded. Charter members included Aquinas College, Concordia College Ann Arbor (now Concordia University Ann Arbor), Cornerstone College (now Cornerstone University), Siena Heights College (now Siena Heights University), Spring Arbor College (now Spring Arbor University) and Tri-State University (now Trine University), beginning the 1992–93 academic year.
- 1997 – Madonna University joined the WHAC in the 1997–98 academic year.
- 1998 – Indiana Institute of Technology (Indiana Tech) joined the WHAC in the 1998–99 academic year.
- 2003 – Tri-State left the WHAC and the NAIA to join the Division III ranks of the National Collegiate Athletic Association (NCAA) as an NCAA D-III Independent (which would later join the Michigan Intercollegiate Athletic Association (MIAA), beginning the 2004–05 academic year) after the 2002–03 academic year.
- 2004 – Spring Arbor left the WHAC to join the Mid-Central College Conference (MCCC; now the Crossroads League) after the 2003–04 academic year.
- 2004 – The University of Michigan–Dearborn joined the WHAC in the 2004–05 academic year.
- 2005 – Davenport University joined the WHAC in the 2005–06 academic year.
- 2010 – The University of Northwestern Ohio joined the WHAC in the 2010–11 academic year.
- 2011 – Lourdes University joined the WHAC in the 2011–12 academic year.
- 2012 – Lawrence Technological University and Marygrove College joined the WHAC in the 2012–13 academic year.
- 2016 – Two institutions joined the WHAC as affiliate members, both effective in the 2016–17 academic year:
  - Rochester College (now Rochester Christian University) for baseball
  - and former full member Spring Arbor for men's and women's bowling
- 2017 – Davenport left the WHAC and the NAIA to join the NCAA Division II ranks and the Great Lakes Intercollegiate Athletic Conference (GLIAC) after the 2016–17 academic year.
- 2017 – Rochester had joined the WHAC for all sports in the 2017–18 academic year.
- 2017 – Marygrove left the WHAC as the school announced that it would close at the end of the fall 2017 semester, which occurred during the 2017–18 academic year.
- 2018 – Cleary University joined the WHAC in the 2018–19 academic year.
- 2018 – Four institutions joined the WHAC as affiliate members, all effective in the 2019 spring season (2018–19 academic year):
  - Bethel University of Indiana for women's lacrosse
  - Goshen College for men's volleyball
  - Huntington University for men's and women's bowling
  - and Taylor University for men's lacrosse
- 2019 – Two institutions joined the WHAC as affiliate members (and/or added other single sports into their affiliate memberships), all effective in the 2019 spring season (2018–19 academic year):
  - Mount Vernon Nazarene University for men's and women's bowling
  - Spring Arbor for competitive cheer and dance
  - and Taylor for women's lacrosse
- 2020 – Three institutions left the WHAC as affiliate members (and/or removed other single sports from their affiliate memberships), all effective after the 2019–20 academic year:
  - Mount Vernon Nazarene for men's and women's bowling
  - Spring Arbor for competitive cheer and dance
  - and Taylor for women's lacrosse
- 2020 – Five institutions joined the WHAC as affiliate members (and/or added other single sports into their affiliate memberships), all effective in the 2020–21 academic year:
  - Bethel (Ind.) for men's and women's bowling
  - Brescia University and Point Park University for competitive cheer
  - Marian University for men's wrestling
  - and Mount Vernon Nazarene for men's volleyball
- 2021 – Bethel (Ind.), Huntington and Spring Arbor left the WHAC as affiliate members for men's and women's bowling after the 2020–21 academic year.
- 2022 – Three institutions joined the WHAC as affiliate members (and/or added other single sports into their affiliate memberships), all effective in the 2022–23 academic year:
  - Bethel (Ind.) and Saint Mary-of-the-Woods College for men's volleyball
  - and Marian (Ind.) for women's lacrosse
- 2023 – Brescia left the WHAC as an affiliate member for competitive cheer after the 2022–23 academic year.
- 2023 – Marian (Ind.) added competitive dance to its WHAC affiliate membership in the 2023–24 academic year:
- 2024 – Two institutions left the WHAC as affiliate members (and/or removed other single sports from their affiliate memberships), both effective after the 2023–24 academic year:
  - Point Park for competitive cheer to join the NCAA Division II ranks and the Mountain East Conference (MEC)
  - and Saint Mary-of-the-Woods for men's volleyball
- 2024 – Defiance College joined the WHAC in the 2024–25 academic year.
- 2024 – Two institutions joined the WHAC as affiliate members (and/or added other single sports into their affiliate memberships), both effective in the 2024–25 academic year:
  - The University of St. Francis for men's and women's bowling
  - and Saint Xavier University for eSports
- 2025 – Concordia–Ann Arbor left the WHAC after the 2024–25 academic year; as the school discontinued all athletic programs.
- 2026:
  - Bethel (Ind.), Goshen and Mount Vernon Nazarene left the WHAC as affiliate members for men's volleyball after the 2026 spring season (2025–26 academic year).
  - Lourdes and Siena Heights left the WHAC after the 2025–26 academic year; as both schools had ceased operations.

== Member schools ==
=== Current members ===
The WHAC currently has 10 full members, all but one are private schools:

Institution	Location	Founded	Affiliation	Enrollment	Nickname	Joined (Note: Represents the calendar year when fall sports competition begins.)	Basketball?
Aquinas College	Grand Rapids, Michigan	1886	Catholic (D.S.G.R.)	1,295	Saints	1992	both
Cleary University	Howell, Michigan	1883	Nonsectarian	1,040	Cougars	2018	both (Note: The Cleary men's and women's basketball teams joined the WHAC five years after becoming a full member for other sports (2023–24).)
Cornerstone University	Grand Rapids, Michigan	1941	Interdenominational	1,735	Golden Eagles	1992	both
Defiance College	Defiance, Ohio	1850	United Church	511	Yellow Jackets	2024	both
Indiana Institute of Technology	Fort Wayne, Indiana	1930	Nonsectarian	2,862	Warriors	1998	both
Lawrence Technological University	Southfield, Michigan	1932	Nonsectarian	3,260	Blue Devils	2012	both
Madonna University	Livonia, Michigan	1930	Catholic (Felician Sisters)	2,054	Crusaders	1997	both
University of Michigan–Dearborn	Dearborn, Michigan	1959	Public (Note: Part of the University of Michigan system.)	8,035	Wolverines	2004	both
University of Northwestern Ohio	Lima, Ohio	1920	Nonsectarian	2,606	Racers	2010	both
Rochester Christian University (Note: Formerly known as Rochester University prior to 2024 and Rochester College prior to 2019.)	Rochester Hills, Michigan	1959	Churches of Christ	1,173	Warriors	2017 (Note: Before joining for full membership, Rochester Christian competed in the WHAC as an affiliate member for baseball during the 2016–17 school year.)	both

=== Affiliate members ===
The WHAC currently has seven affiliate members, all are private schools:

Institution	Location	Founded	Affiliation	Enrollment	Nickname	Joined (Note: Represents the calendar year when fall sports competition begins.)	WHAC sport(s)	Current conference
Bethel University	Mishawaka, Indiana	1947	Missionary	1,222	Pilots	2018^{w.lax.}	women's lacrosse	Crossroads
Marian University	Indianapolis, Indiana	1851	Catholic (S.S.F.)	3,586	Knights	2020^{m.wr} 2022^{w.lax} 2023^{dance}	men's wrestling women's lacrosse competitive dance	Crossroads
University of St. Francis	Joliet, Illinois	1920	Catholic (Franciscans)	3,185	Fighting Saints	2024^{m.bowl.} 2024^{w.bowl.}	men's bowling women's bowling	Chicagoland (CCAC)
Saint Xavier University	Chicago, Illinois	1846	Catholic (R.S.M.)	3,457	Cougars	2024	eSports	Chicagoland (CCAC)
Taylor University	Upland, Indiana	1846	Nondenominational	2,398	Trojans	2018	men's lacrosse	Crossroads

=== Former members ===
The WHAC had seven former full members, all were private schools:

Institution	Location	Founded	Affiliation	Enrollment	Nickname	Joined (Note: Represents the calendar year when fall sports competition begins.)	Left (Note: Represents the calendar year when spring sports competition ends.)	Current conference
Concordia University Ann Arbor	Ann Arbor, Michigan	1963	Lutheran LCMS	1,351	Cardinals	1992	2025	N/A (Note: Concordia–Ann Arbor dropped intercollegiate athletics after the 2024–25 school year.)
Davenport University	Grand Rapids, Michigan	1866	Nonsectarian	4,848	Panthers	2005	2017	Great Lakes (GLIAC) (Note: Currently an NCAA Division II athletic conference.)
Lourdes University	Sylvania, Ohio	1958	Catholic (Franciscan)	1,014	Gray Wolves	2011	2026	Closed in 2026
Marygrove College	Detroit, Michigan	1899	Catholic (I.H.M.)	N/A	Mustangs	2012	2018 (Note: Marygrove announced that all athletics would cease after the 2017 fall season (with men's & women's soccer and volleyball remaining) of the 2017–18 school year; with their August 2017 announcement of the closing of school's undergraduate programs.)	Closed in 2019
Siena Heights University	Adrian, Michigan	1919	Catholic (O.P.)	1,832	Saints	1992	2026	Closed in 2026
Spring Arbor University	Spring Arbor, Michigan	1873	Free Methodist	2,390	Cougars	1992	2004	Crossroads
Tri-State University (Note: Currently known as Trine University since 2008.)	Angola, Indiana	1884	Nonsectarian	4,471	Thunder	1992	2003	Michigan (MIAA) (Note: Currently an NCAA Division III athletic conference.)

=== Former affiliate members ===
The WHAC had nine former affiliate members, all were private schools:

Institution	Location	Founded	Affiliation	Enrollment	Nickname	Joined (Note: Represents the calendar year when fall sports competition begins.)	Left (Note: Represents the calendar year when spring sports competition ends.)	WHAC sport(s)	Current conference
Bethel University	Mishawaka, Indiana	1947	Missionary	1,222	Pilots	2020^{m.bowl.} 2020^{w.bowl.} 2022^{m.vb.}	2021^{m.bowl.} 2021^{w.bowl.} 2026^{m.vb.}	men's bowling women's bowling men's volleyball	Crossroads
Brescia University	Owensboro, Kentucky	1925	Catholic (Ursulines)	638	Bearcats	2020	2023	competitive cheer	River States (RSC)
Goshen College	Goshen, Indiana	1894	Mennonite	824	Maple Leafs	2018	2026	men's volleyball	Crossroads
Huntington University	Huntington, Indiana	1897	United Brethren in Christ	1,504	Foresters	2018^{m.bowl.} 2018^{w.bowl.}	2021^{m.bowl.} 2021^{w.bowl.}	men's bowling women's bowling	Crossroads
Mount Vernon Nazarene University	Mount Vernon, Ohio	1964	Nazarene	1,845	Cougars	2019^{m.bowl.} 2019^{w.bowl.} 2020^{m.vb.}	2020^{m.bowl.} 2020^{w.bowl.} 2026^{m.vb.}	men's bowling women's bowling men's volleyball	Crossroads
Point Park University	Pittsburgh, Pennsylvania	1960	Nonsectarian	3,299	Pioneers	2020	2024	competitive cheer	Mountain East (MEC) (Note: Formerly an NCAA Division II athletic conference.)
Rochester College (Note: Later known as Rochester University in 2019 and now currently known as Rochester Christian University since 2024.)	Rochester Hills, Michigan	1959	Churches of Christ	1,173	Warriors	2016	2017	baseball	Wolverine–Hoosier (WHAC)
Saint Mary-of-the-Woods College	Saint Mary-of-the-Woods, Indiana	1840	Catholic (Sisters of Providence)	1,227	Pomeroys	2022	2024	men's volleyball	River States (RSC)
Spring Arbor University (Note: Spring Arbor was a full member of the WHAC from 1992–93 to 2003–04.)	Spring Arbor, Michigan	1873	Free Methodist	2,390	Cougars	2016^{m.bowl.} 2016^{w.bowl.} 2019^{cheer.} 2019^{dance}	2021^{m.bowl.} 2021^{w.bowl.} 2020^{cheer.} 2020^{dance}	men's bowling women's bowling competitive cheer competitive dance	Crossroads
Taylor University	Upland, Indiana	1846	Nondenominational	2,398	Trojans	2019	2020	women's lacrosse	Crossroads

=== Membership timeline ===
Full member (non-football) Associate member (sport)

== Sports ==
WHAC offers 14 men's and 13 women's sports.

Conference sports
Sport	Men's	Women's
Baseball	✓	
Basketball	✓	✓
Bowling	✓	✓
Cheer	✓	✓
Cross Country	✓	✓
Golf	✓	✓
Dance		✓
Ice Hockey	✓	
Lacrosse	✓	✓
Soccer	✓	✓
Softball		✓
Tennis	✓	✓
Track & Field Indoor	✓	✓
Track & Field Outdoor	✓	✓
Volleyball	✓	✓
Wrestling	✓	
