= Hispanic and Latino (ethnic categories) =

Ethnonyms used to refer to Hispanic or Latino Americans in the United States

Hispanic and Latin are ethnonyms used to refer collectively to the inhabitants of the United States who are of Spanish or Latin American ancestry. While many use the terms interchangeably, for example, the United States Census Bureau, others maintain a distinction: Hispanic refers to people from Spanish-speaking countries (including Spain but excluding Brazil), while Latin refers people from Latin American countries (including Brazil but excluding Spain and Portugal). Spain is included in the Hispanic category, and Brazil is included in the Latino category; Portugal is excluded from both categories. Every Latin American country is included in both categories, excluding Brazil.

Hispanic was first used and defined by the U.S. Federal Office of Management and Budget's (OMB) Directive No. 15 in 1977, which defined Hispanic as "a person of Mexican, Puerto Rican (Territory of the United States of America), Cuban, Central America or South America or other Spanish culture or origin, regardless of race." The term was formed out of a collaboration with Mexican-American political elites to encourage cultural assimilation into American society among all Hispanic/Latin peoples and move away from the anti-assimilationist politics of Chicano identity, which had gained prominence in the preceding decades through the Chicano Movement. The rise of Hispanic identity paralleled an emerging era of conservatism in the United States during the 1980s.

Latin first emerged at the local level through media outlets in the early 1990s. The Los Angeles Times was one of the first major newspapers to use the term Latin instead of Hispanic. Some local panethnic institutions and Spanish-language media adopted the term for community unity and political organizing. The emergence of Latin resulted in increasing criticism over Hispanic. Many supporters of Latin argued that Hispanic was reasserting a colonial dynamic or relationship with Spain. Others argued that Hispanic failed to acknowledge mestizo culture and political struggle as well as erased the existence of Indigenous, Afro-Latin American, and Asian Latin peoples throughout the Americas. Latin was also described as more inclusive. Latin was included along with Hispanic on the 2000 U.S. census.

There remains no definitive consensus over which term should be used, which has led to the rise of Hispanic/Latin and Hispanic and Latin as categorical terms often used by government institutions and prominent organizations. The choice between the terms is frequently associated with location: persons in the Eastern United States tend to prefer Hispanic, whereas those in the West tend to prefer Latin. According to a 2011 study by the Pew Research Center, the majority (51%) of Hispanic and Latin Americans prefer to identify with their families' country of origin or nationality, while only 24% prefer the terms Hispanic or Latin. Both Hispanic and Latin are generally used to denote people living in the United States. Outside of the United States, people living in Latin American countries usually refer to themselves by the names of their respective countries of origin.

== History ==
Hispanus was the Latin name given to a person from Hispania during Roman rule. The ancient Roman Hispania, which roughly comprised what is currently called the Iberian Peninsula, included the contemporary states of Spain, Portugal, and Andorra, and the British Overseas Territory of Gibraltar but excluding the Spanish and Portuguese overseas territories of Canary Islands, Ceuta, Melilla, Açores and Madeira.

The term Hispanic was adopted by the United States government in the early 1970s during the administration of Richard Nixon after the Hispanic members of an interdepartmental Ad Hoc Committee to develop racial and ethnic definitions recommended that a universal term encompassing all Hispanic subgroups—including Central and South Americans—be adopted. As the 1970 census did not include a question on Hispanic origin on all census forms—instead relying on a sample of the population via an extended form ("Is this person's origin or descent: Mexican; Puerto Rican (territory of the United States of America) Descendants of people in Puerto Rico are from Spain; Cuban; Central or South American; Other Spanish; or None of these"), the members of the committee wanted a common designation to better track the social and economic progress of the group vis-à-vis the general population.

Legal scholar Laura E. Gómez notes that key members of the Mexican-American political elite with assimilationist ideologies, all of whom were middle-aged men, helped popularize the term Hispanic among the Mexican-American community, which in turn fueled both electronic and print media to use the term when referring to Mexican Americans in the 1980s. Gómez conducted a series of interviews with Mexican-American political elites on their role in promoting Hispanic and found that one of the main reasons was because it stood in contrast to Chicano identity: "The Chicano label reflected the more radical political agenda of Mexican-Americans in the 1960s and 1970s, and the politicians who call themselves Hispanic today are the harbringers of a more conservative, more accommodationist politics." Some of these elites sought to encourage cultural assimilation through Hispanic within their community and not be seen as "militant" in order to appeal to white American sensibilities, particularly in regard to separating themselves from black political consciousness. Gómez records:

Another respondent agreed with this position, contrasting his white colleagues' perceptions of the Congressional Hispanic Caucus with their perception of the Congressional Black Caucus. 'We certainly haven't been militant like the Black Caucus. We're seen as a power bloc—an ethnic power bloc striving to deal with mainstream issues.'

The designation has since been used in local and federal employment, mass media, academia, and business market research. It has been used in the U.S. Census since 1980. Because of the popularity of Latin in the western portion of the United States, the government adopted this term as well in 1997, and used it in the 2000 census.

Previously, Hispanic and Latin Americans were categorized as "Spanish-Americans", "Spanish-speaking Americans", or "Spanish-surnamed Americans". However:

- Although a large majority of Hispanic and Latin Americans have Spanish ancestry, most are not of direct, "from-Spain-to-the-U.S." Spanish descent; many are not primarily of Spanish descent; and some are not of Spanish descent at all. People whose ancestors or who themselves arrived in the United States directly from Spain are a tiny minority of the Hispanic or Latin population (see figures in this article), and there are Hispanic/Latin Americans who are of other European ancestries in addition to Spanish (e.g., Portuguese, Italian, German, and Middle Eastern, such as the Lebanese, Palestinians, and Mizrahi Jews).
- Most Hispanic and Latin Americans can speak Spanish, but not all, and most Spanish-speaking Americans are Hispanic or Latin, but not all. For example, Hispanic/Latin Americans often do not speak Spanish by the third generation, and some Americans who speak Spanish may not identify themselves with Spanish-speaking Americans as an ethnic group.
- Not all Hispanic and Latin Americans have Spanish surnames, and most Spanish-surnamed Americans are Hispanic or Latin, but not all, e.g., Filipino surnames. Those without Spanish surnames but of Hispanic or Latin origin include politician Bill Richardson, former National Football League (NFL) star Jim Plunkett, and actress Salma Hayek.

== Usage of Hispanic ==
The term Hispanic has been the source of several debates in the United States. Within the United States, the term originally referred typically to the Hispanos of New Mexico until the U.S. government used it in the 1970 Census to refer to "a person of Mexican, Puerto Rican, Cuban, South or Central American, or other Spanish culture or origin, regardless of race." The OMB did not accept the recommendation to retain the single term Hispanic. Instead, the OMB has decided that the term should be "Hispanic or Latino" because regional usage of the terms differs. Hispanic is commonly used in the eastern portion of the United States, whereas Latin is commonly used in the western portion. Since the 2000 Census, the identifier has changed from "Hispanic" to "Spanish/Hispanic/Latin".

Other federal and local government agencies and non-profit organizations include Brazilians and Portuguese in their definition of Hispanic. The US Department of Transportation defines Hispanic as "persons of Mexican, Puerto Rican, Cuban, Dominican, Central or South American, or others [of] Spanish or Portuguese culture or origin, regardless of race." This definition has been adopted by the Small Business Administration as well as by many federal, state, and municipal agencies for the purposes of awarding government contracts to minority-owned businesses.

The Congressional Hispanic Caucus (CHC)—which was organized in 1976 by five Hispanic Congressmen: Herman Badillo (NY), Baltasar Corrada del Río (PR), Kika de la Garza (TX), Henry B. Gonzalez (TX) and Edward Roybal (CA)—and the Congressional Hispanic Conference include representatives of Spanish and Portuguese descent. The Hispanic Society of America is dedicated to the study of the arts and cultures of Spain, Portugal, and Latin America. The Hispanic Association of Colleges and Universities, which proclaims itself the champion of Hispanic success in higher education, has member institutions in the U.S. mainland, Puerto Rico, Latin America, Spain, and Portugal.

In a 2012 study, most Spanish speakers of Spanish or Latin American descent in the United States did not choose to use the terms Hispanic or Latin when describing their identity. Instead, they preferred to be identified by their country of origin. Over half of those surveyed said they had no preference for either term. When forced to choose, 33% chose Hispanic and 14% chose "Latin."

A study done in 2009 shows that there is not a significant difference between the attitudes or preferences towards the terms among young (18–25) and older individuals. The statistical numbers are almost identical. Among the overall Hispanic population, young Hispanics prefer to identify themselves with their family's country of origin. Both groups prefer the term "American" versus "Latin/Hispanic". Yet, older Hispanics are more likely to identify as white than younger Hispanics. When it comes to the preference of Latin or Hispanic, the younger subgroup is more likely to state that it does not matter. If they do have a preference, both groups prefer the term Hispanic rather than Latin.

== Origin of Latino ==
The terms Latino and Latina are loan words from Italy and originated in Ancient Rome. The term Latin America was coined in France in the mid-19th century as Amérique latine, during the time of the Second French intervention in Mexico. Scholar Juan Francisco Martinez writes that "France began talking about Latin America during the rule of Napoleon III as a way of distinguishing between those areas of the Americas originally colonized by Europeans of Latin descent and those colonized by peoples from northern Europe. But the term was used to justify French intervention in the young republics of Latin America."

The adoption of the term Latino by the U.S. Census Bureau in 2000 and its subsequent media attention brought about several controversies and disagreements, specifically in the United States and, to a lesser extent, in Mexico and other Spanish-speaking countries. Regarding it as an arbitrary, generic term, many Latin American scholars, journalists and organizations have objected to the mass media use of the word Latino, pointing out that such ethnonyms are optional and should be used only to describe people involved in the practices, ideologies and identity politics of their supporters. They argue that if Hispanic is an imposed official term, then so is Latino, since it was the French who coined the expression "Latin America" (Amérique latine) to refer to the Spanish, French, and Portuguese-speaking countries of the Western Hemisphere, during their support of the Second Mexican Empire.

== Distinctions between Latino, Latina, and Hispanic ==
Some authorities of American English maintain a distinction between the terms Hispanic and Latino:

Though often used interchangeably in American English, Hispanic and Latino have slightly different ranges of meaning. Hispanic, from the Latin word for "Spain," has the broader reference, potentially encompassing all Spanish-speaking peoples in both hemispheres and emphasizing the common denominator of language among communities that might sometimes seem to have little else in common. Latino—which in Spanish means "Latin" but in English is probably a shortening of the Spanish word latinoamericano—refers more exclusively to persons or communities of Latin American Spanish-speaking origin. Of the two, only Hispanic can be used in referring to Spain and its history and culture. In practice, however, this distinction is of little significance when referring to Spanish-speaking residents of the United States, most of whom are of Latin American origin and can thus theoretically be called by either word. Since the 1980s Latino has come to be much more prevalent than Hispanic in national media, but actual Americans of Spanish-speaking Latin American heritage are far from unified in their preferences. For some, Latino is a term of ethnic pride, evoking the broad mix of Latin American peoples, while Hispanic, tied etymologically to Spain rather than the Americas, has distasteful associations with conquest and colonization. But in recent polls of Americans of Spanish-speaking Latin American ancestry, Hispanic is still preferred over Latino among those expressing a preference, while those having no preference constitute a majority overall.

The AP Stylebook also distinguishes between the terms. The Stylebook limits "Hispanic" to persons "from—or whose ancestors were from—a Spanish-speaking land or culture. Latino and Latina are sometimes preferred". It provides a more expansive definition, however, of Latino. The Stylebook definition of Latino includes not only persons of Spanish-speaking land or ancestry, but also more generally includes persons "from—or whose ancestors were from— ... Latin America." The Stylebook specifically lists Brazilians as an example of a group that can be considered Latino.

Latino is traditionally reserved for males or a combination of males and females, and Latina for females. A group of Latina women is termed Latinas, whereas a group of Latino men or a combination of Latino and Latina individuals are designated as "Latinos".

== Alternative terms ==
=== Latino/a and Latin@ ===
Both Latino/a and Latin@ aim to challenge the gender binary that is inherent in Portuguese and Spanish, which combines the Portuguese/Spanish masculine ending ⟨o⟩ and the feminine ⟨a⟩.

Latin@ has been noted to have the symbolical importance of suggesting inclusiveness, by having the ⟨o⟩ encircle the ⟨a⟩, in one character. Latin@ may be used to promote gender neutrality or be used to encompass both Latinos and Latinas without using the masculine "Latinos" designation for the mixed genders group.

=== Latinx ===
The term Latinx was introduced in the early 2000s as a gender-neutral term for Latino/Latina, in addition to encompassing those who identify outside of the gender binary, such as those who are transgender, or those who are gender-fluid. The term has been embraced by the Latin LGBTQ+ communities.

The term Latinx reportedly surfaced with LGBTQ+ spaces on the internet in 2004, but use of the term did not take off until a decade later.

The term has drawn criticisms for its invented roots, in addition to its perceived corruption of the Spanish language.

== Hispanic/Latino nationalities ==
The U.S. government has defined "Hispanic or Latino" persons as being "persons who trace their origin [to] ... Central and South America, and other Spanish cultures". The Census Bureau's 2010 census provides a definition of the terms Latino and Hispanic: "Hispanic or Latino" refers to a person of Mexican, South or Central American, or other Spanish culture or origin regardless of race. It allows respondents to self-define whether they were Latino or Hispanic and then identify their specific country or place of origin. On its website, the Census Bureau defines "Hispanic or Latino" persons as being "persons who trace their origin [to] ... Spanish-speaking Central and South America countries, and other Spanish cultures".

These definitions thus arguably do not include Brazilian Americans or Belizean Americans, especially since the Census Bureau classifies Brazilian Americans and Belizean Americans as separate ancestry groups from "Hispanic or Latino". A surge of Portuguese Americans faced a big scare when the Census Bureau revealed plans to categorize people of Portuguese descent as "Hispanics" in the 2020 census. The unified feelings of dispute were displayed in a national survey conducted by Palcus within the Portuguese-American community. The results were an overwhelming 90% of participants objecting to Portuguese Americans being classified under the Hispanic ethnicity.

Fortunately for those opposed to the Portuguese-as-Hispanic classification, the Census Bureau later released an update stating that they never intended to classify people of Portuguese descent as Hispanic in the 2020 census. The 28 Hispanic or Latino American groups in the Census Bureau's reports are the following: "Mexican; Central American: Costa Rican, Guatemalan, Honduran, Nicaraguan, Panamanian, Salvadoran, Other Central American; South American: Bolivian, Chilean, Colombian, Ecuadorian, Paraguayan, Peruvian, Venezuelan, Other South American; Other Hispanic or Latino: Spanish, Spanish American, All other Hispanic".

== Criticism from the media ==
In the U.S., the terms are officially voluntary, self-designated classifications. However, the mass media has helped propagate them irrespective of this fact. The rapid spread of Latino in the U.S. has been possible due to the policies of certain newspapers such as the Los Angeles Times and other California-based media during the 1990s. Raoul Lowery Contreras writes:

For years I have campaigned against the Los Angeles Times-imposed word, 'Latino', in describing the country's fastest growing ethnic 'Group,' those with Spanish-surnames, those who speak Spanish, et al. The LA Times set its feet in concrete and the use of the word 'Latino' and nothing has cracked the concrete since. Worst of all, other newspapers have followed the Times' lead and news coverage, accuracy and the community have suffered.

Lowery Contreras argues that, according to the statistics of the Census Bureau, most middle class people with Latin American background living in the U.S. reject the term. He traces the polarization of the word to Los Angeles Times columnist Frank del Olmo, who regarded the term Hispanic as "ugly and imprecise". He writes:

The third reason Del Olmo objected to the word 'Hispanic' and championed the word 'Latino' was that 'Chicano' had been roundly rejected by all Mexican Americans but the most radical, blue collar, less educated, under-class people of Mexican-origin. Del Olmo pushed 'Latino' as a substitute for the rejected 'Chicano.' Unfortunately, he was in a position to push this substitution into the language of the 'Newspaper of Record' in the West. Other papers and broadcast stations took up the word because it was the 'style' of the LA Times. Frank Del Olmo single-handedly branded millions of people.

== Latino, Hispanic or national identity ==
The naming dispute is a phenomenon that has its roots mainly in California and other neighboring states. Before the adoption of the ethnonym "Hispanic or Latino" by the U.S. government, the term Hispanic was commonly used for statistical purposes. However, many people did not feel satisfied with the term and started campaigns promoting the use of Latino as a new ethnonym. The Office of Management and Budget has stated that the new term should be, indeed, "Hispanic or Latino" because the usage of the terms differs—"Hispanic is commonly used in the eastern portion of the United States, whereas Latino is commonly used in the western portion".

Despite this, debates regarding the proper name of the perceived homogeneous population of U.S. citizens with Latin American or Spanish background still abound, and are even more acute. To find out how much people agree or disagree with either term, many polls have been conducted. According to a December 2000 poll by Hispanic Trends, 65% of the registered voters preferred the word Hispanic, while 30% chose to identify themselves as Latino. Daniel David Arreola, in his book Hispanic spaces, Latino places: community and cultural diversity in contemporary America, points out that many Latin Americans feel more comfortable identifying themselves with their country of origin:

What most of us know and what the results from the 1992 Latino National Political survey demonstrate is a preference for place of origin or national identity in what we call ourselves. Face-to-face interviews of 2,817 people were conducted in 1989 and 1990. Some 57 percent to 86 percent of Mexicans and Puerto Ricans—whether born in Mexico or born in the United States, whether born in the island or in the mainland—preferred to call themselves Mexican or Puerto Rican rather than panethnic names like Hispanic or Latin.

A Pew Hispanic Center survey conducted November 9 – December 7, 2011, and published April 4, 2012, reported:

Nearly four decades after the United States government mandated the use of the terms 'Hispanic' or 'Latino' to categorize Americans who trace their roots to Spanish-speaking countries, a new nationwide survey of Hispanic adults finds that these terms still haven't been fully embraced by Hispanics themselves. A majority (51%) say they most often identify themselves by their family's country of origin; just 24% say they prefer a pan-ethnic label.

== Academic reception ==
One of the major arguments of people who object to either term is not only the perceived stereotypical overtones they carry, but the unjust and unfair labeling of people who do not even belong to the practices and ideologies of such identities. This is true of many indigenous peoples such as the Wixarikas and the Lacandones, who still practice their own religious rituals without syncretism with Catholic elements. Journalist Juan Villegas writes:

The word 'Latino' may be loaded with negative connotations when used by non-Latinos in American culture because of its association with the sign 'Latin' which may imply a stereotyped character partially imposed by Hollywood. Latino is a sign that needs to be contextualized. It may bring some groups together, but it also may contribute to depoliticize a movement and to stereotype a diversity of social groups and cultures.

These characteristics that are often used, such as Hollywood, to classify a person of Latina/o culture and identity has been termed by scholars, "As a system of media signification, Latinidad is a performative and performed dynamic set of popular signs associated with Latinas/os and Latina/o identity. Common signifiers of Latinidad are language, linguistic accents, religious symbols, tropical and spicy foods, and brown skin as a phenotypic identity." (Berg Ramirez p. 40–41). As Guzman discusses, "signifiers most commonly associated with Latinidad produce a sense of authenticity within media texts", (p. 235). Ramirez continues to discuss how these signifiers of Latinidad do not necessarily mean they are stereotypical. In actuality, Latina/os may utilize these "signifiers" for self-identifying purposes. In terms of media portrayal, Hollywood has invested a lot of time and money to develop a general notion of "Latinidad" because marketers, advertisers and media content producers have found that they are a very bankable demographic, thus turned "Latinidad" and Latina/o culture and identity to a commodity. What is problematic about this is when creating this general notion, the diversity within this demographic becomes suppressed and flattened in a demographic that is very heterogeneous just so marketers, advertisers and media content producers can communicate their version of "authentic" racial identity to consumers. Consequently, this opens the space for stereotypes to be created and perpetuated.

Others, such as Catherine Alexandra Carter and Rodolfo Acuña, address the issue from a more global and political perspective, stressing the importance of terms like Latino or Hispanic for the marketing industry and for statistical ends:

The terms 'Hispanic' and 'Latino', although first created for the purpose of lumping together a diverse group of people and making them more economically marketable, have grown into something far more significant. Over time the legitimacy and accuracy of these terms have come to influence not only the functioning of the marketing industry, but the organization and structure of many other aspects of life.

When and why the Latino identity came about is a more involved story. Essentially, politicians, the media, and marketers find it convenient to deal with the different U.S. Spanish-speaking people under one umbrella. However, many people with Spanish surnames contest the term 'Latino'. They claim it is misleading because no Latino or Hispanic nationality exists since no Latino state exists, so generalizing the term 'Latino' slights the various national identities included under the umbrella.

Davila expands on the ramifications of the mass media's dominant use of Latino or Hispanic to categorize this demographic, "... the extent to which assertions of cultural differences intersect with dominant norms of American citizenship that give preeminence to white, monolingual, middle-class producers of and contributors to a political body defined in national terms. My concern is ... with how notions of citizenship, belonging, and entitlement are directly intertwined and predicated on dominant U.S. nationalist categories. Such categories conflate race, culture, and language with nationality, establishing the hierarchies and coordinates against which cultural and linguistic differences are ultimately evaluated (Ong 1999; Williams 1989). It is therefore these hierarchies that frame the discourses of Latinidad channeled in the media, as well as the media's treatment of language and what it may potentially communicate to and about Latino's claim to belonging, and in what terms they may or may not be within the political community of the United States." Consequently, this may leave issues, concerns, and topics relevant to this demographic left unheard, discussed and addressed. They are left invisible, therefore not only conflating the cultural differences, but also marginalizing them for the sake of convenience and marketability to the mass media. However, this is not to say this is a monolithic issue. Instead, this further gives incentive for the demographic to create a space in which they can transform these notions where the representations are more diverse, complex and authentic.

== See also ==
- Hispanic and Latino Americans
- Media bias
- Native American name controversy
- Naming controversy
- Race and ethnicity in Latin America
