= NCOD =

NCOD may refer to:

- National Coming Out Day
- National Center on Deafness
