= Ken Lubas =

American photojournalist

Ken Lubas is a photographer from the United States. He was a photojournalist for the Los Angeles Times for 33 years before pursuing a career in fine-art photography and photo illustration. His work has appeared in Sports Illustrated, TV Guide, National Geographic, Time, U.S. News & World Report, Newsweek and Life Magazine. An alumnus of San Fernando Valley State College, he won two Pulitzer Prizes as a Los Angeles Times photographer and several other.
