= California State University, Northridge =

Public university in Los Angeles, California, US

- Former names: Satellite campus of Los Angeles State College (1952–1958); San Fernando Valley State College (1958–1972)
- Motto: Vox Veritas Vita (Latin)
- Motto in English: "Speak the truth as a way of life"
- Type: Public university
- Established: 1956; 70 years ago
- Parent institution: California State University
- Accreditation: WSCUC
- Academic affiliations: CUMU
- Endowment: $366.3 million (2026)
- Budget: $592.6 million (2026)
- President: Erika D. Beck
- Provost: Meera Komarraju
- Faculty: 2,085 (fall 2025)
- Administrative staff: 1,913 (fall 2025)
- Students: 36,960 (fall 2025)
- Undergraduates: 32,846 (fall 2025)
- Postgraduates: 4,114 (fall 2025)
- Location: Los Angeles, California, U.S. 34°14′30″N 118°31′42″W
- Campus: 356 acres (144 ha); Large city
- Newspaper: Daily Sundial
- Colors: Red and black
- Nickname: Matadors
- Sporting affiliations: NCAA Division I – Big West; MPSF
- Mascot: Matty the Matador
- Website: csun.edu

California State University, Northridge (CSUN /ˈsiːsʌn/ or Cal State Northridge), is a public university in the Northridge neighborhood of Los Angeles, California, United States. With a total enrollment of 36,960 students (as of Fall 2025), it has the fourth largest total student body in the California State University system. The size of CSUN also has a major impact on the California economy, with an estimated $1.9 billion in economic output generated by CSUN on a yearly basis. As of fall 2025, the university had 2,085 faculty members, of which around 37% were tenured or on the tenure-track.

California State University, Northridge, was founded first as the Valley satellite campus of California State University, Los Angeles. It then became an independent college in 1958 as San Fernando Valley State College, with major campus master planning and construction. In 1972, the university adopted its current name of California State University, Northridge. The 1994 Northridge earthquake caused $400 million (equivalent to $869 million in 2025) in damage to the campus, the heaviest damage ever sustained by an American college campus.

The university offers 134 different bachelor's degree and master's degree programs in 70 fields, as well as four doctoral degrees. It is classified among "Master's Colleges & Universities: Larger Programs".

CSUN is home to the National Center on Deafness and the university hosts the annual International Conference on Technology and Persons with Disabilities, more commonly known as the CSUN Conference. Cal State Northridge is a Hispanic-serving institution.

== History ==
=== Establishment ===
The establishment of CSUN began in 1952 with the proposal of a new satellite campus for Los Angeles State College (now known as California State University, Los Angeles), to be established in Baldwin Hills. However, San Fernando Valley advocates persuaded state officials, including California Assembly member Julian Beck, to change the location to Northridge after a meeting at the Brown Derby restaurant on Wilshire Boulevard. The origins of San Fernando Valley State College trace back to September 1955, when classes first began in 10 leased classrooms at San Fernando High School. The official groundbreaking of the university occurred on January 4, 1956, and was performed by, among others, the Governor of California Goodwin Knight and Los Angeles State College President Howard S. McDonald. While it is situated in a suburban location nowadays, it was a rural location during its founding.

=== 1956–1965 ===
Classes started on September 24, 1956, in temporary buildings, with an enrollment of 1,500 students. Delmar Oviatt, the former namesake of the campus library (subsequently renamed University Library), was the dean of the satellite campus until July 1, 1958, when the campus separated from Los Angeles State College and was renamed San Fernando Valley State College (popularly abbreviated to Valley State College, Valley State, or SFVSC) after the California Legislature passed Assembly Bill No. 971. Ralph Prator was assigned as the first president of the university and enrollment reached 2,525 with a tuition of $29 per semester. During that same year, the first graduation ceremony was held for around 100 students at the Hollywood Bowl; it was held on campus during subsequent years. In 1959, the university became the first State College to have its own computer. In 1964, the pioneering computer lab was moved into new quarters in the recently completed Sierra Hall building complex, and student enrollment reached nearly 12,000. Buildings were swiftly constructed during the early 1960s. Additionally, in November 1963 the university established its own radio station, which continues operation to this day as KCSN.

On October 25, 1960, then vice presidential nominee Lyndon B. Johnson visited the campus accompanied by Governor Pat Brown to hold a rally in front of approximately 3,500 students. Four years later, then Republican candidate Nelson Rockefeller held a rally at the university in front of around 6,000 students, which was organized by the university's Republican Club. In December 1965, with increasing conversation and tension on the topic of civil rights in the country, the university hosted a debate between the conservative thinker William F. Buckley Jr. and liberal African American journalist Louis Lomax.

=== 1966–1972 ===
Vice President Hubert Humphrey is met by student protest in 1966 while visiting San Fernando Valley State College (now CSUN)

The campus's quiet, moderately conservative and overwhelmingly white suburban setting did not shield it from a share of the noise, strife and social upheavals of the Vietnam War era. As on many college campuses, there were antiwar demonstrations.

In September 1966, Vice President Hubert Humphrey visited the campus, where he was met by students protesting the Vietnam War. On March 25, 1968, a presidential campaign speech on campus by Robert F. Kennedy drew an orderly crowd of 10,000 and mainly focused on his opposition to the Vietnam War. Shortly thereafter, his opponent Eugene McCarthy also held a rally at the university which drew a crowd of 7,000 spectators.

However, 1968 would not end quite so peacefully on the campus. The April assassination of Martin Luther King Jr. in Memphis, Tennessee, soon followed by the June assassination of Robert F. Kennedy in Los Angeles, then the August 1968 Democratic National Convention in Chicago, had led to a series of riots throughout the nation. On November 4, the assault of an African American student athlete by his white coach on the CSUN campus led a group of African American students to hold the acting college president and more than 30 staff members hostage in the Administration Building for several hours, pressing demands for greater outreach in minority enrollment and employment and the establishment of minority studies departments. No one was hurt and, under duress, the president agreed to their demands. After subsequent negotiations, minority enrollment was increased and both the Africana and Chicano/a departments were established. Despite an assurance of amnesty, 28 of the students involved were later charged with kidnapping, assault, conspiracy, and false imprisonment, according to scholar Martha Biondi "the most serious crimes ever in the history of campus protest." Nineteen were convicted and three served time in state prison. Almost one month later, a fire started by an arsonist gutted the president's office.

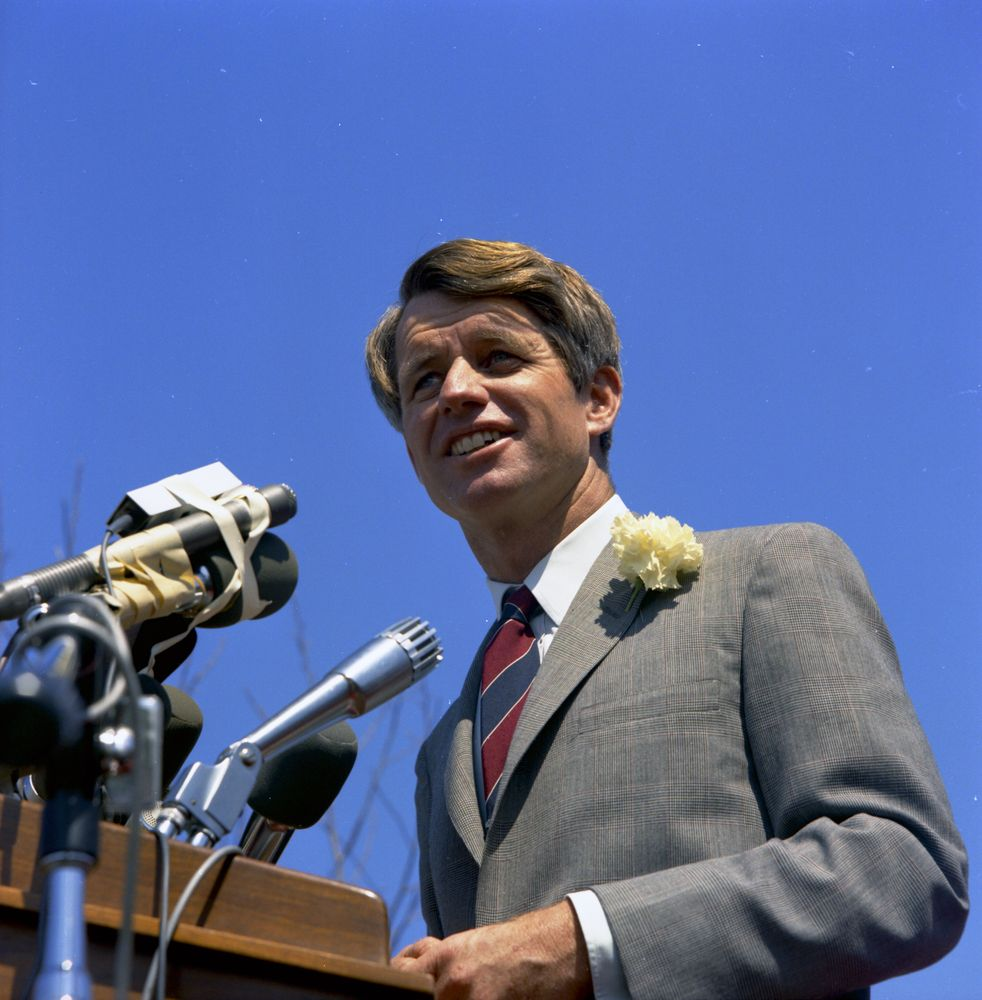
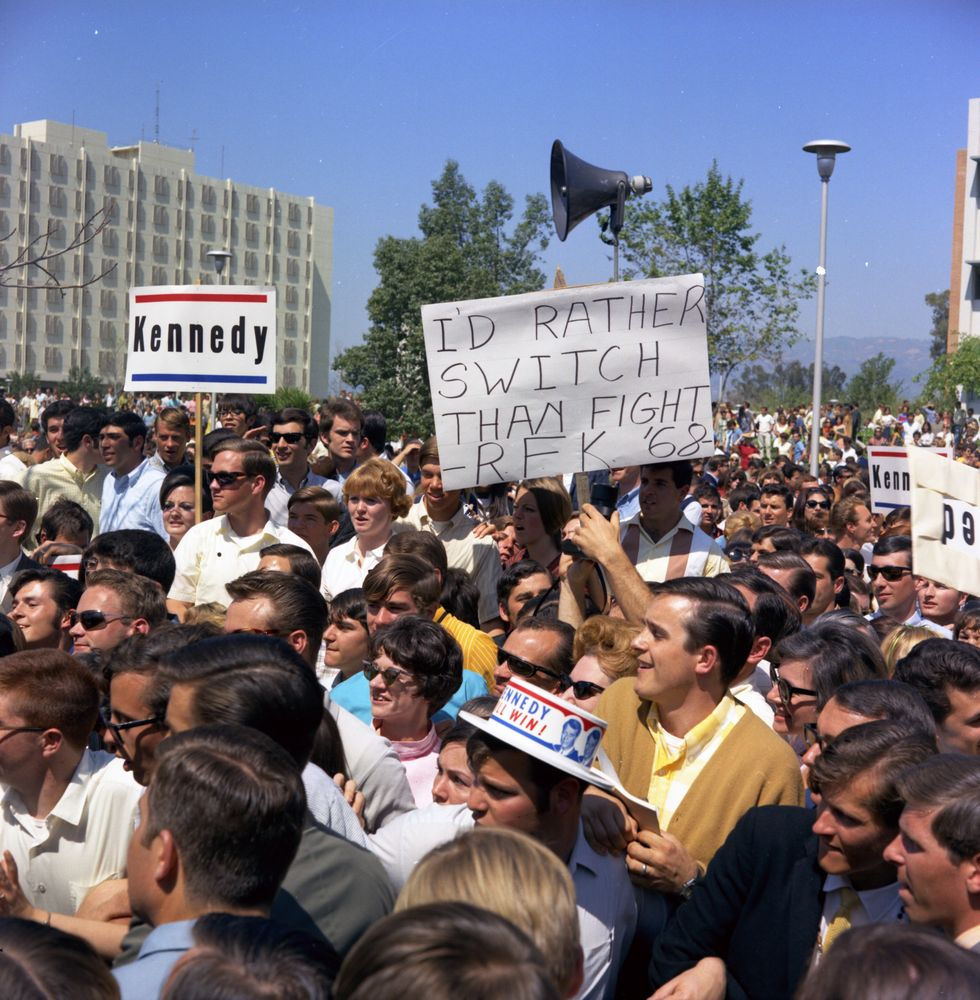
Robert F. Kennedy addresses the crowd at San Fernando Valley State College (now CSUN) in 1968

Furthermore, several massive antiwar demonstrations took place during 1969–1970, variously resulting in campus shutdowns, heavy police responses, violent clashes, hundreds of arrests, and in a few cases serious injuries to demonstrators. The last such demonstration was in May 1971, on the first anniversary of the Kent State shootings.

Aside from the demonstrations, the university also catered to hippie culture when Janis Joplin performed with Big Brother and the Holding Company at what is now the Matadome on May 12, 1968. Additionally, the Newport Pop Festival was held at the Devonshire Downs, now CSUN's North Campus, in June 1969 and attracted 200,000 attendees to watch performances by Jimi Hendrix, Ike & Tina Turner, Marvin Gaye, Jethro Tull and various others.

Despite the turmoil during this period, the university continued to grow and construction of the Oviatt Library began on May 19, 1971. The college also officially renamed itself to California State University, Northridge on June 1, 1972, by action of the Legislature and the Board of Trustees of the California State University.

=== 1973–1988 ===
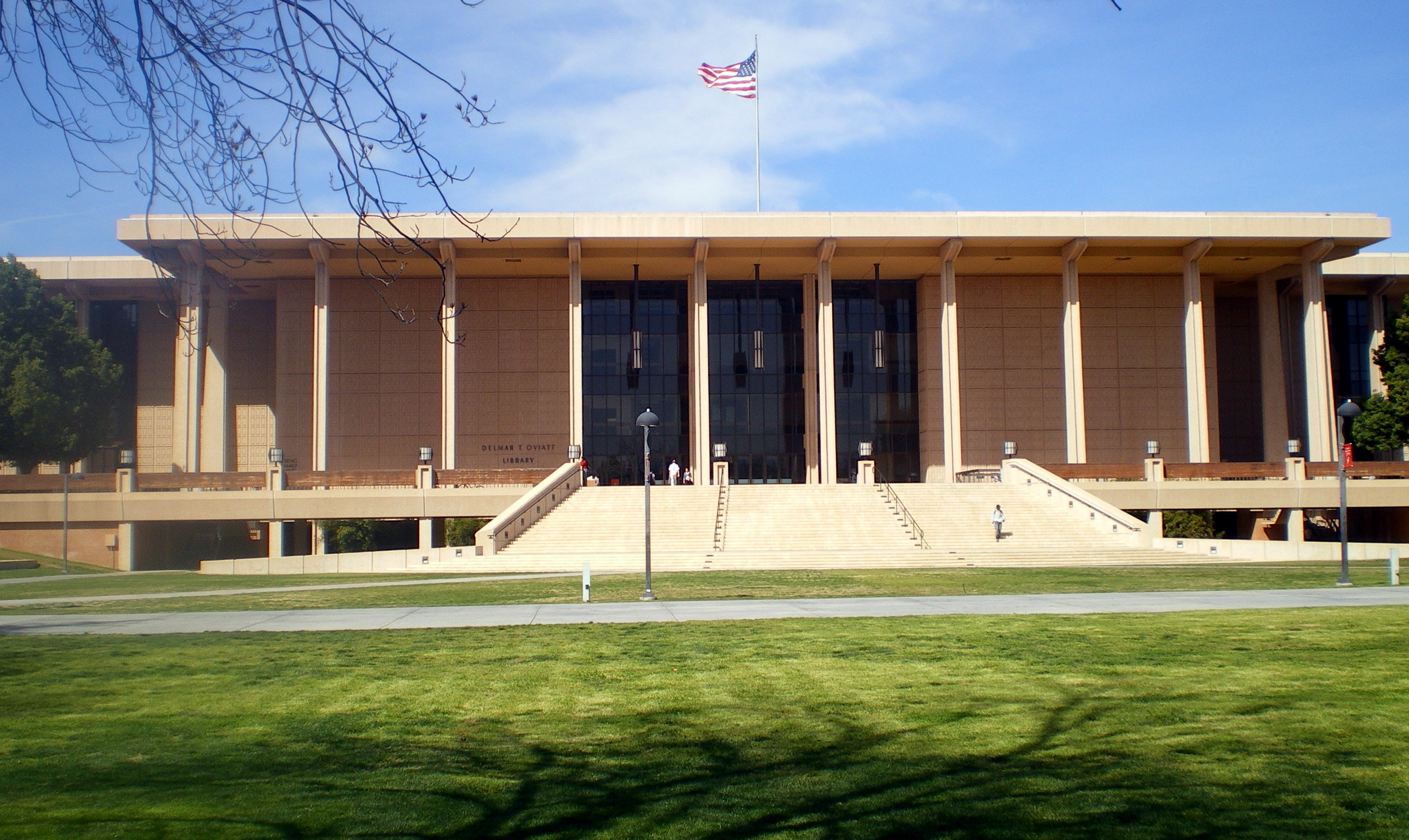
University Library, opened October 24, 1973

On October 24, 1973, the university's library, once named the Oviatt Library and renamed to the University Library in 2020, was completed and opened. In 1975, the construction of the CSUN sculpture began at the southeast corner of campus after the design by alumnus John T. Banks. By 1977, enrollment at the university was 28,023, with tuition at $95. In 1981, the campus officially established a foreign exchange student program with Japan, China, Ukraine, South Korea, Taiwan, Brazil and the Netherlands. In 1988, the campus had an enrollment of 31,575 and a $342 tuition fee.

In 1974, in partnership with UC Santa Barbara, CSUN opened the Ventura Learning Center in Ventura. This became the CSUN Ventura Campus in 1988 and was spun off into California State University, Channel Islands in 1998.

=== 1989–1997 ===
In 1990, the Marilyn Magaram Center for Food Science, Nutrition and Dietetics was established; the Oviatt Library east and west wings were added; and the campus had the California State University system's only fully established astronomy department with a planetarium.

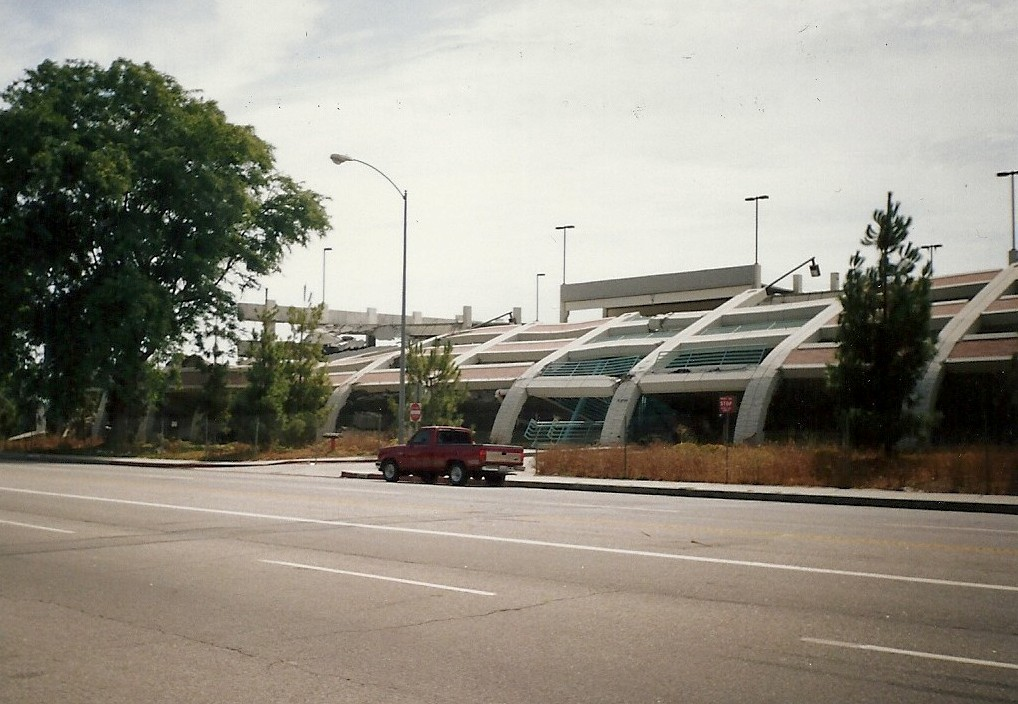
Earthquake damage sustained by parking structure C after the 1994 Northridge earthquake at CSUN

The 1994 Northridge earthquake struck on January 17 and caused $400 million in damage to the campus, the heaviest damage ever sustained by an American college campus. The epicenter was less than two miles (3 km) away on a previously undiscovered blind thrust fault. Later the same month, Vice President Al Gore visited with a promise of funds to help with the reconstruction. Entire sections of the main library, the art building and several other major structures were either physically unusable or too hazardous to occupy. Among the structures judged to be so seriously damaged that repair was not a practical option were the Fine Arts building, designed by noted modernist architect Richard Neutra, and the South Library, the oldest permanent building on campus. The art courtyard survived. Due to inadequate earthquake engineering, the parking structure next to the Matadome was completely destroyed.

Despite the extensive damage, classes for the spring term started only two weeks late. The classes were held in rapidly constructed tents and temporary facilities, remaining campus buildings deemed safe for use, and local high schools, community colleges, and University of California, Los Angeles (UCLA) while the campus was being rebuilt. On January 17, 1995, President Bill Clinton visited the campus to commemorate the first anniversary of the quake.

=== 1997–2019 ===
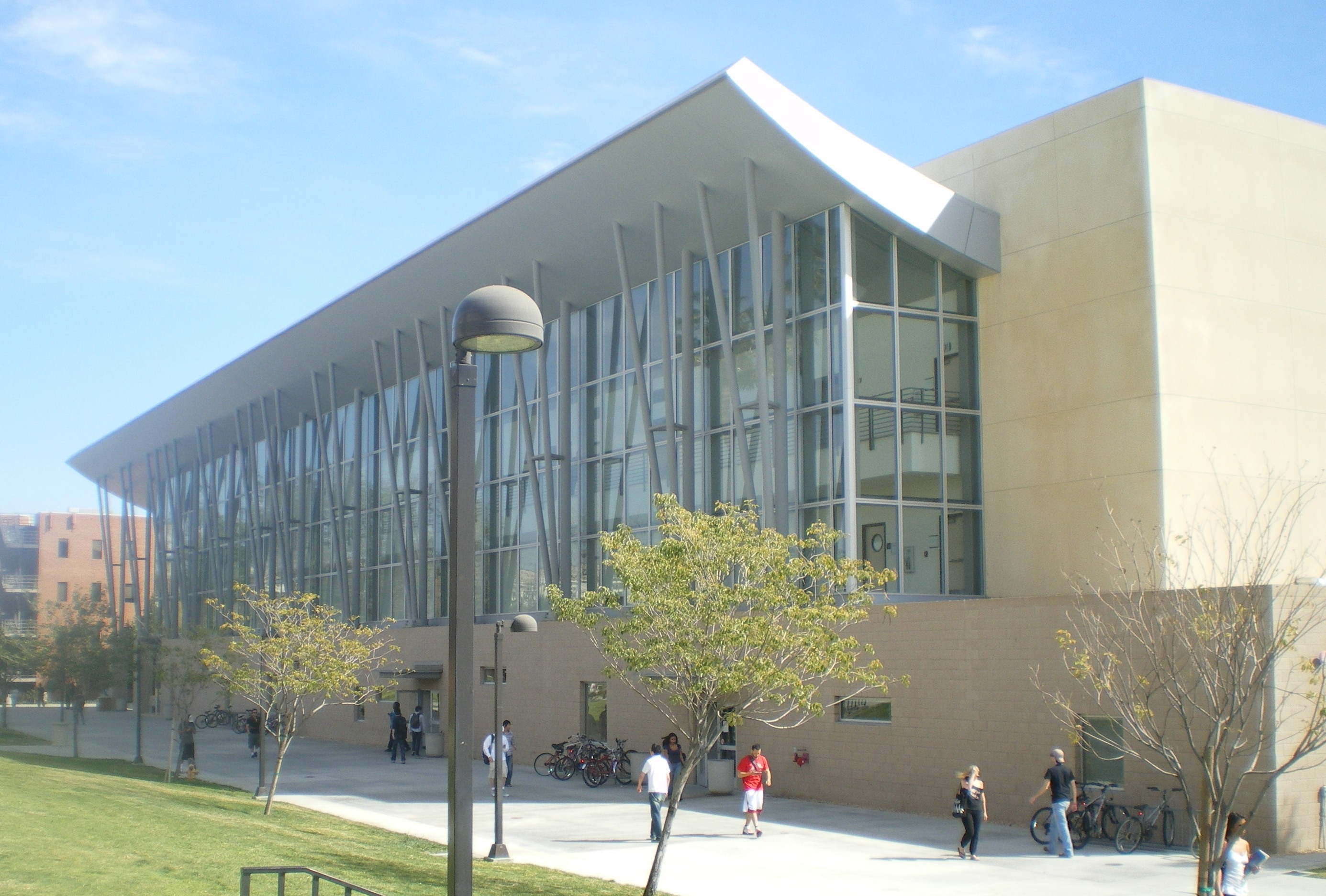
Manzanita Hall, one of the buildings constructed as part of the earthquake recovery

In April 1999, the Board of CSU trustees decided to give $27 million to construct post-earthquake projects. The university opened the first Central American Studies program in the nation in May 2000. In 2003, both University Hall and Manzanita Hall were opened, marking the completion of the earthquake recovery program. California State University trustees on March 15, 2006, voted their unanimous approval of Envision 2035, the Cal State Northridge planning initiative that framed the university's physical development for the next several decades. The vote approved the revised master plan as well as an increase in the campus' master plan enrollment capacity from 25,000 to 35,000 full-time equivalent students (FTEs). The trustees also certified the final environmental impact report on the plan. The university in 2007, with clean energy advocates, built the new 1 megawatt fuel cell power plant which was the largest of its kind in any university in the world.

The campus community maintained its legacy of activism when budget cuts and tuition fee hikes were announced during the 2008 financial crisis. Students formed the Students Against Rising Tuition group and protested while Governor Arnold Schwarzenegger visited the campus in February 2008. Subsequently, students, staff and faculty protested further cuts introduced by the Governor later in the year. Protests against the budget cuts continued on March 4, 2010, when a statewide protest against the budget cuts was organized, with several professors cancelling class and large numbers of students leaving their classes to join the protests and march down Reseda Boulevard. The protests resulted in several arrests, but in turn students raised allegations of abusive behavior from the police. Aside from the protests, politicians continued to visit the campus as in previous decades, this time with visits from 2008 Democratic presidential candidate Hillary Clinton, United States Senators Barbara Boxer and Dianne Feinstein, and a visit in 2016 from future Vice President (then Attorney General of California) Kamala Harris.

This period also saw increased donations to the university, with gift commitments reaching a record $31.7 million in 2018. Major donations included $7 million from Michael Eisner in 2002, $7.3 million from the Bayramian family estate in 2005, $10 million from Mike Curb in 2006, $10 million from David Nazarian in 2014, and a then record $17 million from Younes Nazarian in 2017. This period also saw an increase in sponsored research.

In 2019, a record 11,627 students graduated from the university. The same year, president Dianne F. Harrison announced she would retire at the end of June 2020.

=== 2020–present ===
Like many other universities around the U.S. and the world, CSUN was heavily affected by the COVID-19 pandemic. The university ceased in-person instruction on March 12, 2020, when the pandemic started to take hold in the United States. Two months later, the California State University was the first in the nation to announce that fall instruction would also be almost exclusively online. The university saw major revenue losses as a result of the pandemic and announced a budget cut in August 2020, despite receiving the 7th largest amount in the nation from the first wave of Covid relief funds under the CARES Act. In total, CSUN received the most federal Covid relief funds ($265 million) out of all universities in California after the three waves of relief funds from the CARES Act, Consolidated Appropriations Act, 2021, and American Rescue Plan Act of 2021. In January 2021, CSUN became a vaccination site. When the site closed in June of the same year, around 250,000 people had been vaccinated on the campus.

CSUN received the two largest donations in its history in 2021. On June 15, 2021, the university announced it had received a donation of $40 million from MacKenzie Scott and her husband Dan Jewett; the largest gift from a single donor in its history. Three months later CSUN announced it had received the second largest donation in its history, $25 million, from Apple. The donation, combined with $25 million of state appropriations and over $7 million in support from Autodesk, was used for the establishment of a Global Hispanic Serving Institution (HSI) Equity Innovation Hub and construction of the Autodesk Technology Engagement Center (which houses the hub). The hub allows for collaboration from across the CSU and other hispanic-serving institutions to improve student success, equity, and prepare students from historically disadvantaged backgrounds for STEM careers. Moreover, Apple will provide technology, design support and creative support at the hub as the project matures. The public–private partnership was made possible by political support from various state politicians, including Governor Gavin Newsom and Senator Alex Padilla, as well as an initial donation of $1 million from Autodesk for a feasibility study.

During this time period the university also completed construction of Maple Hall, which was financed by $49.9 million of CSU funds. The completion of this building cleared the way to renovate neighboring Sierra Hall, pending funding and construction approval.

== Academics ==
=== Admissions ===
Undergraduate admission statistics
	Fall 2025	Fall 2024	Fall 2023	Fall 2022	Fall 2021
First-time Freshmen
Applicants	33,297	33,350	30,098	26,276	23,656
Admits	30,554	30,842	27,748	23,687	20,842
Admit rate	92%	92%	92%	90%	88%
Enrolled	5,238	5,543	5,545	4,972	4,716
Yield rate	17%	18%	20%	21%	23%
Transfers
Applicants	13,835	13,924	14,624	15,916	18,975
Admits	9,596	10,027	10,007	10,760	12,608
Admit rate	69%	72%	68%	68%	66%
Enrolled	4,320	4,338	4,360	5,059	6,074
Yield rate	45%	43%	44%	47%	48%

In the fall of 2018, there were 60,519 applicants, of which 31,102 were admitted for an acceptance rate of 51.4%. As of fall 2018, CSUN has the largest enrollment percentage of Latino Americans that are not Mexican American in the Cal State system. These are Latino Americans with heritage from Central America, South America and the Caribbean. In addition, CSUN has the third largest enrollment percentage of non-residents in the California State University system.

=== International students ===
Undergraduate demographics as of Fall 2023
Race and ethnicity	Total
Hispanic	57%
White	19%
Asian	9%
Black	5%
Two or more races	3%
Foreign national	3%
Unknown	3%
Economic diversity
Low-income (Note: The percentage of students who received an income-based federal Pell grant intended for low-income students.)	56%
Affluent (Note: The percentage of students who are a part of the American middle class at the bare minimum.)	44%

For the academic year 2015–2016, the number of foreign students who attended U.S. institutions exceeded the one million mark. During the same year, CSUN was ranked as the number one Master's institution, having the highest number of international students in the United States. The total number of international students for that academic year totaled 3,924.

=== Colleges ===
CSUN is divided into nine colleges:

- Mike Curb College of Arts, Media, & Communication
- College of Humanities
- College of Science and Mathematics
- College of Social & Behavioral Sciences
- David Nazarian College of Business & Economics
- Michael D. Eisner College of Education
- Andrew Anagnost College of Engineering & Computer Science
- College of Health & Human Development
- Roland Tseng College of Extended Learning

=== Joint degrees ===
The university, in partnership with Southwestern Law School, offers a dual B.A./J.D degree. The program allows students to graduate within six years instead of the traditional seven if both degrees were taken separately. The program began in fall 2014 with an estimated cohort size of 35 students. In addition, students accepted into the program receive an initial $10,000 Wildman/Schumacher entering student scholarship. Students in the program will have their first year of law school double count as their fourth year of undergraduate education.

==== Community College Collaboratives ====
CSUN offers a pathway program for academic progression in the field of Nursing that links CSUN with designated California Community College (CC) partners. This program enables students who are interested in attaining an ADN to earn a BSN degree in 2 1/2 years. Students will be concurrently enrolled in both nursing programs, taking courses for their BSN while completing their associate degree at the community college. On completion of their ADN students will be able to complete their BSN in one year. Students must be accepted into an ADN program at one of the participating community colleges.

The following California Community Colleges are currently partnered up with CSUN Nursing: Glendale Community College, College of the Canyons, Los Angeles Valley College, and Pierce College.

=== Central American Studies Department ===
Central American Studies is an interdisciplinary academic space with an emphasis on the transnational character of Central America. The department is the only program to focus on Central Americans in the United States. The Central American Studies program was established in 2000 after years of lobbying were derailed by the 1994 Northridge earthquake. The program began with a minor which required 18 units for graduation and developed into a Bachelor of Arts program with 13 graduates in 2017.

== Research ==
Since 2015, CSUN receives around $35 million annually in research funding from over 210 awards each year. For the most recent fiscal year of 2024, CSUN received funding of around $45 million from 230 grants. The College of Math and Science at CSUN is the biggest recipient of grant money, with around $11.4 million in funding in fiscal year 2024. Its faculty are published in numerous articles in peer-reviewed journals each year.

To support research activities for both faculty and students, CSUN built a 10,000-square-foot (930 m^{2}) research facility. Half of this building, named Lilac Hall, is currently occupied by The Health Equity Research & Education (HERE) Center, which is funded by a $22 million NIH grant to support biomedical and health equity research at CSUN in the form of the BUILD PODER program; the other half of the building houses a laser lab containing femtosecond lasers to study energy flows and electric charges in nanomaterials, with the intention to design more efficient solar energy devices and nanomaterial-based photothermal therapy for cancer treatment. Another major research program at CSUN is the CSUN-UCLA Bridges to Stem Cell Research program. This ongoing collaboration allows undergraduate students to perform research in one of 50 stem cell research labs headed by UCLA faculty. CSUN has also been collaborating with the Princeton Center for Complex Materials at Princeton University since 2006. It is also a co-founder and partner institution of the Research Center for Translational Applications of Nanoscale Multiferroic Systems (TANMS), which was established at UCLA through an $18.5 million NSF grant in 2012. Other institutions involved at the center include Cornell University, University of California, Berkeley, ETH Zurich, University of Texas at Dallas and Northeastern University. In 2019, the university received $3 million from NASA to establish the NASA Autonomy Research Center for STEAHM. The interdisciplinary research center will comprehensively study increasingly autonomous (IA) systems, such as artificial intelligence and automation, through the collaboration between six of the university's colleges, while also collaborating with researchers from NASA's Armstrong Flight Research Center and Jet Propulsion Laboratory.

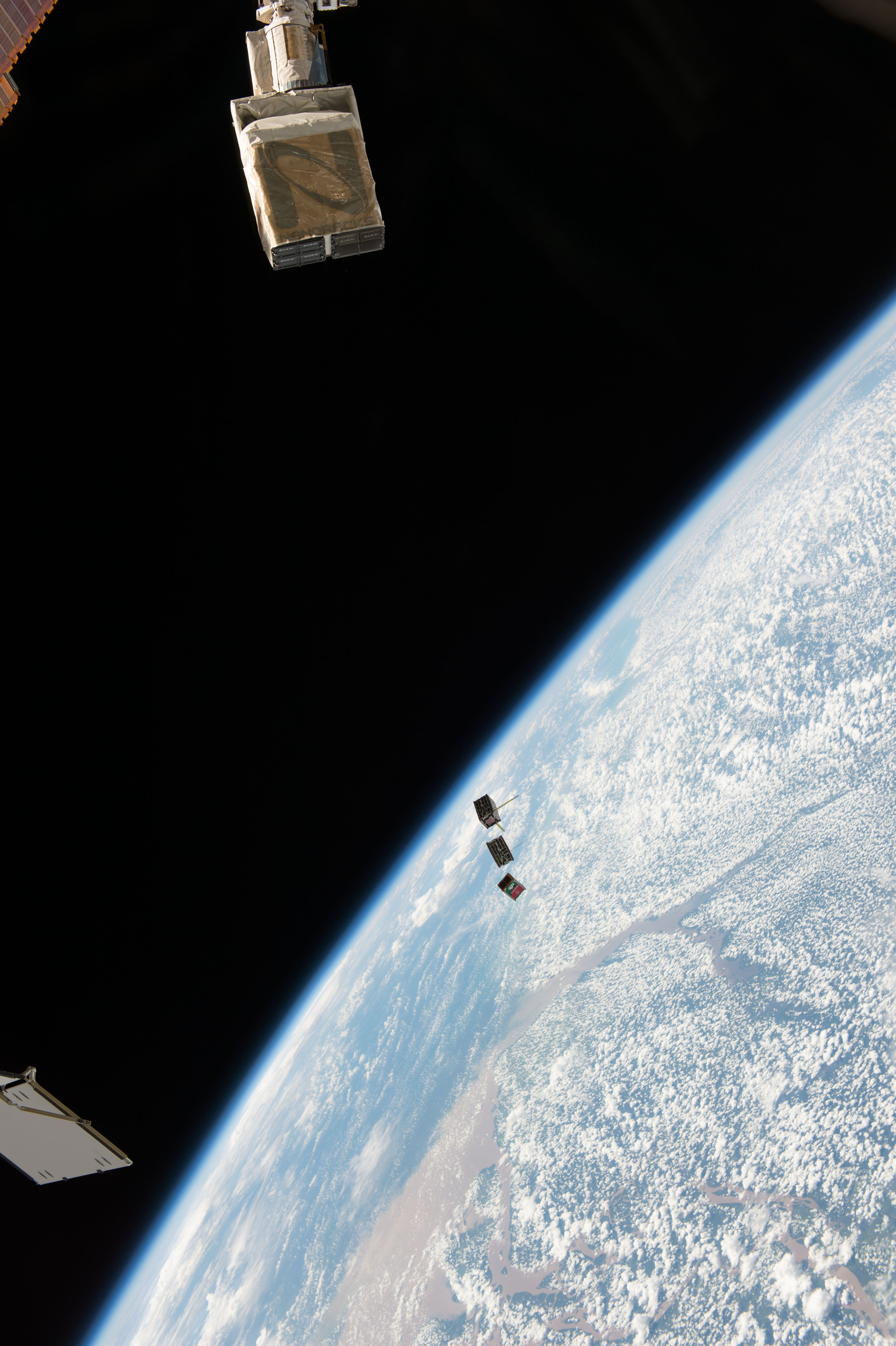
CubeSats being deployed by NanoRacks deployer

CSUN is also home to the San Fernando Observatory. It has operated this observatory since 1976 and moved the observatory from its location in Sylmar to the campus in 2016. The observatory mainly functions as a solar observatory, and due to its decades long operation by CSUN, has allowed hundreds of students and faculty members to collect solar data. The photometric images from this facility are used to determine energy changes in the sun and the data collected by this observatory are used by researchers worldwide. The observatory, in combination with the Donald E. Bianchi Planetarium and the stellar (nighttime) observatory, form the only comprehensive astronomy network in the entire California State University system.

Additionally, over 70 CSUN Engineering and Computer Science students designed, built, programmed, and tested a CubeSat named CSUNSat1, which was funded by NASA's Small Spacecraft Technology Partnership program. Its mission is to test a low temperature-capable energy storage system in space, developed by JPL, which will raise the technology readiness level of this storage system from 4 or 5 to 7. The success of this energy storage system will enable future space missions and scientific studies to conduct more experiments while requiring less energy, mass, and volume. The satellite was launched on 18 April 2017 as part of the ELaNa 17 mission by NASA on the Cygnus CRS OA-7 from Kennedy Space Center in Cape Canaveral to the ISS. The satellite was deployed by NanoRacks on May 17, 2017, and the nominal and cold temperature experiments were completed on June 18, 2017. The satellite is still operational and proceeding with its mission operations.

Various faculty members have been awarded prestigious Guggenheim Fellowships for research and creative activity, while over 50 have won Fulbright awards to conduct research or teach abroad. Recipients of the Guggenheim Fellowships have included Kim Victoria Abeles, Judy Baca, and Sabina Magliocco.

== Rankings and recognition ==
Academic rankings

Master's
- Washington Monthly: 3

Regional
- U.S. News & World Report: 17

National
- Forbes: 265
- WSJ/College Pulse: 53

2025–2026 USNWR Best Regional Colleges West Rankings
Top Public Schools	10
Top Performers on Social Mobility	16 (tie)
Best Undergraduate Engineering Programs	60 (At schools where doctorate not offered)
Computer Engineering	9 (2022–2023)
Economics	240 (tie)
Nursing	186

2024 USNWR Graduate School Rankings
Program	Ranking
Health Care Management	57 (tie)
Fine Arts	89 (tie)
Social Work	95 (tie)
Part-time MBA	117 (tie)
Physical Therapy	132 (tie)
Public health	137 (tie)
Speech–Language Pathology	140 (tie)
Public Affairs Program	182 (tie)

Top 10 foreign countries in headcount (Fall 2025)
Country	Headcount
India	466
Bangladesh	54
Myanmar	47
Vietnam	41
China	38
Armenia	32
Japan	32
Iran	24
Canada	21
Brazil	18
Pakistan	18
Taiwan	18

- The 2023 USNWR Best Regional Colleges West Rankings ranks Northridge 13 on Top Public Schools, 15 on Top Performers on Social Mobility.
- The Wall Street Journal ranked CSUN 2 on Most Diverse Learning Environment in the Nation and Sierra Magazine 35 on Sustainable "Cool Schools."
- The 2022 USNWR Best Regional Colleges West Rankings ranks Northridge 13 on best Undergraduate Teaching, 18 on Top Public Schools, 19 on Top Performers on Social Mobility.
- Money magazine ranked CSUN 45th in the nation out of the nearly 750 schools it included for its 2020–21 Best Colleges ranking. It also ranked the university 29th among the nation's public colleges.
- CSUN was ranked 730th globally among universities by the 2020 Nature Index for the share of publications in high-impact journals.
- CSUN has been consistently recognized as having one of the best film schools in the U.S. and in the world. Its music school holds the same recognition.
- In 2020, Washington Monthly ranked CSUN 6th for "Best Bang for the Buck" out of 215 schools in the U.S. western region.
- Forbes ranked CSUN 92nd in its 2019 ranking of America's Best Value Colleges out of the 300 universities that were included.
- CSUN was ranked 4th in the United States by the Social Mobility Index 2020 college rankings.
- CSUN was ranked 3rd in the nation and 1st in California in the amount of bachelor's degrees awarded to Hispanics. CSUN was also ranked 10th nationally and 4th in California in the amount of master's degrees awarded to Hispanics.
- As of 2024, CSUN ranked 9th among the top 25 undergraduate schools whose alumni pass the California Bar Exam (1st among the CSU campuses), accounting for almost 4,000 attorneys.
- The undergraduate engineering program ranked fifth among California public colleges (masters level) and fourteenth among U.S. public colleges.
- CSUN, in collaboration with the LA Cleantech Incubator, ranked 10th worldwide as a top business incubator in 2017/2018. LA Cleantech Incubator also collaborates with UCLA, Caltech, University of Southern California, and California State University, Los Angeles.
- The College of Business and Economics has been recognized by the U.S. Department of Commerce for its vital role in promoting international trade in the Los Angeles area.
- In 2018, CSUN was designated as an Innovation and Economic Prosperity (IEP) University by the APLU.

== Campus ==
=== Locations of interest ===
The CSUN Botanic Garden is located in the southeast quad, near the intersection of Zelzah Avenue and Nordhoff Street. It is part of the Biology Department for university curriculum, and also a regionally important demonstration garden and educational resource for the community. It has new focus projects for plants usable for regionally local sustainable landscaping using sustainable gardening techniques and studying and 'planting' ethnobotany insights and links. One of the few remaining historic (c. 1920s) orange groves is thriving on the southeastern campus quad. The citrus industry formerly had groves covering much of the San Fernando Valley. The rows of large eucalyptus trees, historic windbreaks for agricultural fields from the late 19th century, are found towering over the perimeters of the campus, surviving planners developing campus expansions with valor.

=== University Library ===
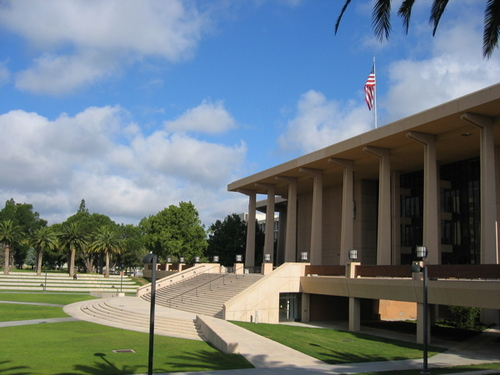
Oviatt Library in 2009, since renamed University Library

The CSUN University Library provides educational, cultural and information services and resources to the students and faculty. Its primary mission is to support and supplement classroom and independent learning; facilitate student and faculty research; and provide students with lifelong skills in identifying, locating, evaluating and synchronizing information.

All library materials are housed in the University Library, a 234,712-square-foot (21,805.5 m^{2}) facility. The library maintains its own AS/RS (Automated Storage and Retrieval System) with the capacity of 1.7 million volumes.

The University Library has a physical collection containing 1.3 million volumes, of which over one million are books, and over 245,000 bound periodical volumes. The library subscribes to over 84,000 online journals, 200 online databases and more than 500,000 ebooks. The microform collection contains 3.1 million pieces. There are over 14,000 sound recordings and over 60,000 film and video recordings. The Special Collections & Archives section of the University Library has possibly the "second largest private collection on human sexuality" after the Kinsey Institute.

In 2019, CSUN president Dianne F. Harrison appointed a campus committee to investigate whether the Oviatt Library should be renamed due to allegations of racism. They recommended that the name of be removed and the name was changed to University Library in December 2020.

==== Other collections ====
Other campus departments and centers with collections:

- The Geography Department holds a large collection of Sanborn maps
- The Script Library in Manzanita Hall features over 800 screenplays

=== Earthquake Sculpture Garden ===
Opened in 2003, the Earthquake Sculpture Garden was created as a means to commemorate those affected by the 1994 Northridge earthquake.

=== Younes and Soraya Nazarian Center for the Performing Arts ===
The Younes and Soraya Nazarian Center for the Performing Arts (formerly the Valley Performing Arts Center) is a performance venue completed in 2011 at a cost of $125 million. Its 166,000 sq ft (15,400 m^{2}) houses a 1,700-seat three-tier concert hall and a 175-seat black box theater, as well as rehearsal rooms, academic and production support spaces, classrooms, and a lecture hall. In 2017, Younes Nazarian and his wife, Soraya Nazarian, donated $17 million to rename the Valley Performing Arts Center to the Younes and Soraya Nazarian Center for the Performing Arts, also known as The Soraya.

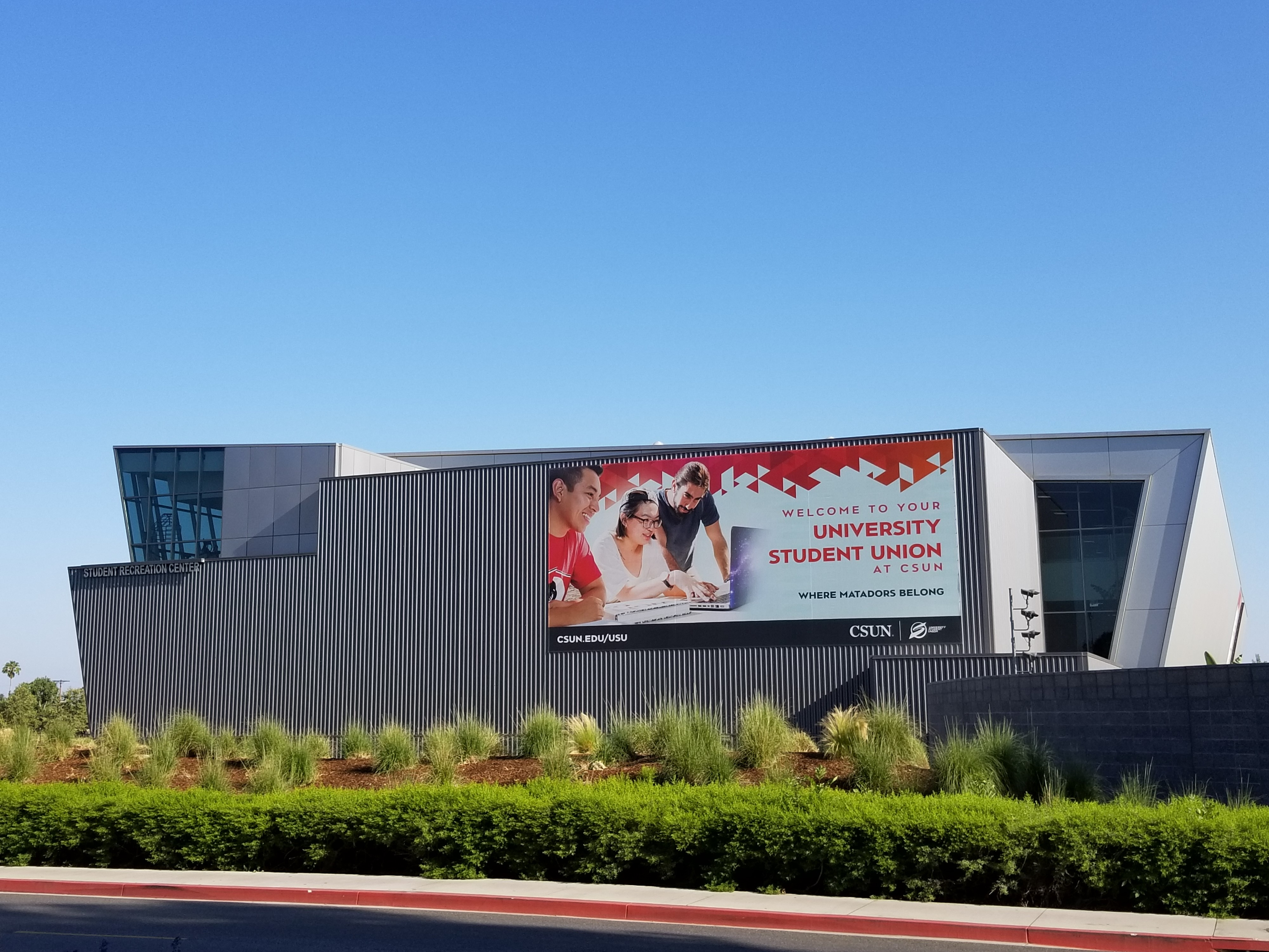
Student Recreation Center

=== University Student Union ===
The University Student Union or USU, is a non-profit student organization that strives to better the college experience. The USU provides a variety of involvement opportunities, programs, services, and job opportunities. In July 2019, it was announced that the USU complex will be reconstructed and expanded. The project is named "The New Heart of Campus" and will cost an estimated $130 million to both replace the old USU complex with a new three story, 79,800-square-foot (7,410 m^{2}) complex and renovate an additional 49,900 square feet (4,640 m^{2}). This project will be financed by both an additional student fee and $24 million in reserves from the University Student Union itself. Construction is set to begin in spring 2020 and the estimated opening date will be in the 2022–2023 academic year.

=== Veteran Resource Center ===
The Veteran Resource Center (VRC) is located within the University Student Union (USU). The VRC is a designated area for veteran students for support as they transition from military service to academia. The VRC is open to all CSUN students.

=== Oasis Wellness Center ===
The Oasis Wellness Center is located beneath the USU computer lab and next to the Plaza Pool. It is described as a place of peace and tranquility in order to help achieve academic success. It provides massage therapy, power-napping sleep pods by appointment, nutrition classes, and yoga. The Oasis Wellness Center is open to all CSUN students.

=== CSUN Food Pantry ===
The CSUN Food Pantry provides food and personal care items, free of cost. This service opened in 2017, and is open to any CSUN student, staff/faculty, and local community members.

=== National Center on Deafness ===
The National Center on Deafness was established in 1972. Support services such as sign language interpreters, real-time captioners, and notetakers are coordinated from this center, as well as serving as a location of academic advisement and gathering of deaf students.

Since 1988 the Strache Leadership Award has been awarded at the CSUN Conference for leadership in the field of disability and technology. The award recognizes the role of education and mentorship while remaining a leader in their field.

Since 2013 the CSUN Conference has issued a Call for Papers and selected papers become part of the Journal on Technology & Persons with Disabilities. In 2018, Journal began providing awards for The Dr. Arthur I. Karshmer Award for Assistive Technology Research for leading researchers in assistive technology, accessibility and inclusion.

== Athletics ==
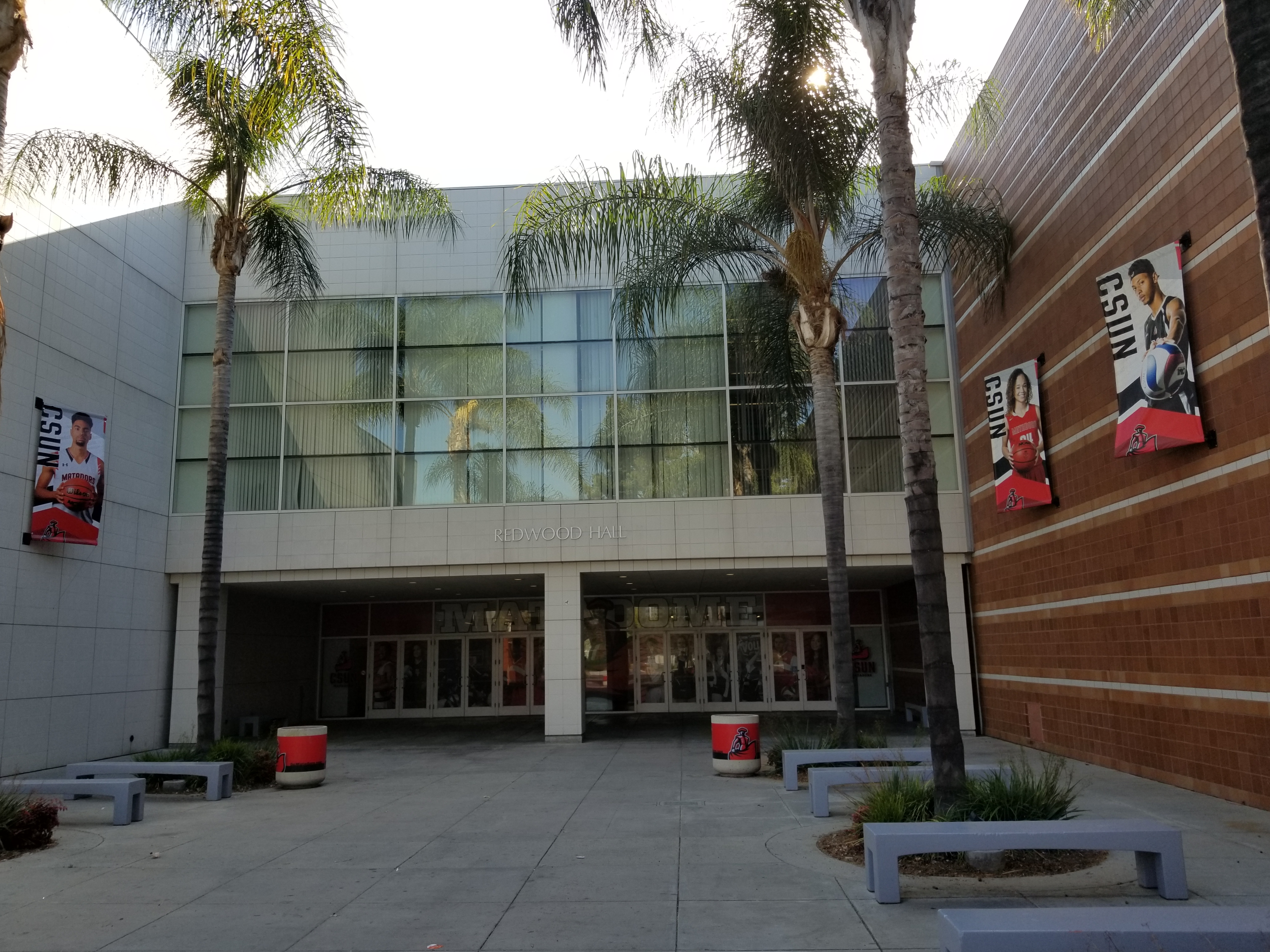
The entrance to the Matadome

CSUN fields 19 teams at the NCAA Division I level. CSUN fields both men's and women's teams in basketball, cross country, golf, soccer, indoor and outdoor track and field, and volleyball. CSUN also has baseball and softball and fields women's teams in beach volleyball, tennis and water polo. Due to state and university budget deficits, CSUN dropped football following the 2001 season. The football team cost the university $1 million a year and had little fan support. CSUN also dropped men's and women's swimming in 2010 due to a statewide and campus budget crisis. CSUN is one of only 45 schools in the nation that has a beach volleyball program.

CSUN moved up to Division I in 1990. Before moving up, the university won 34 national titles at the Division II level which still ranks third all time. CSUN was a member of the Big Sky Conference from 1996 to 2001. They have been a member of the Big West Conference ever since for most sports. The men's and women's indoor track and field teams and the men's volleyball team compete in the Mountain Pacific Sports Federation instead.

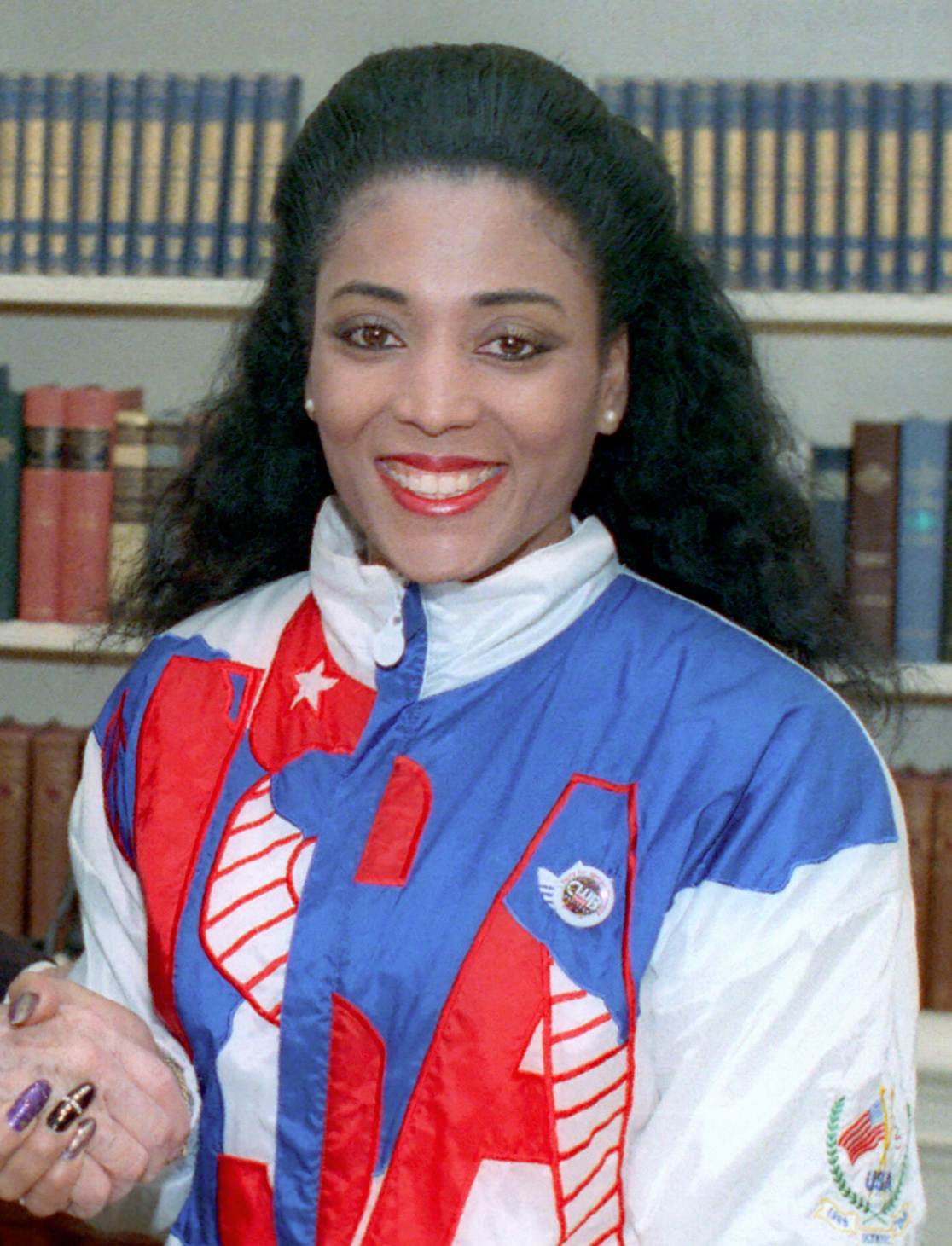
Alumna Florence Griffith Joyner is considered the fastest woman of all time; the world records she set in 1988 for both the 100 m and 200 m still stand.

Since moving up to Division I CSUN has produced two NCAA national runner-up teams: the men's volleyball team in 1993 and softball team in 1994. The Matadors softball team has appeared in three Women's College World Series in 1981, 1993 and 1994, advancing to the title game in 1994 before falling to Arizona. In 2010 the men's volleyball team spent several weeks as the number one ranked team in the nation and also made the Final Four but lost to Penn State in a semi-final match.

The men's basketball team has made it to the NCAA tournament two times in 2001 and 2009. The team made it to three Big Sky championship games in 1997, 2000 and 2001. CSUN beat Eastern Washington in 2001 to advance to their first NCAA tournament. CSUN was seeded 13th and lost to the fourth seed Kansas in the round of 64. CSUN has played in two Big West championship games in 2004 and 2009. CSUN beat Pacific in 2009 and was seeded 15th in the NCAA tournament and lost to the second seed Memphis.

The women's basketball team won the Big West Championship for the first time in 2014. They were the 16th seed in the NCAA tournament and lost to the first seed South Carolina.

CSUN men's Soccer reached the 3rd Round of the 2006 NCAA tournament, knocking out Big West Conference rival UC Santa Barbara in the 2nd Round.

The Women's Track and Field team won six straight Big West titles from 2006 to 2011. The men's Track and Field team has won three Big West titles in 2007, 2009 and 2010.

The men's and Women's Basketball and Volleyball teams all play in the 2,500 seats Matadome located in Redwood Hall.

CSUN's sports teams are known as the Matadors. In 1958 a student vote chose the school colors red and white and 'Matadors' as the school mascot over 158 nominations for possible nicknames. Matadors was elected over four other finalists Apollos, Falcons, Rancheros and Titans.

The men's and women's boxing teams compete in the National Collegiate Boxing Association. CSU hosted the 2016 national championships for the United States Intercollegiate Boxing Association.

The CSUN Esports Club currently hosts several teams for a variety of competitive video games such as League of Legends, Overwatch, Valorant, and Counter-Strike: Global Offensive. As of 2020, the CSUN Esports Club has been officially affiliated by Cloud9, an American Esports Organization under their Cloud9 University Affiliate Program.

== Campus life ==
=== Clubs and organizations ===
There are more than 300 student clubs and organizations at CSUN.

==== Fraternities and sororities ====
The university is home to many Greek life organizations. After the death of Armando Villa, who died during an 18-mile hike when pledging for a fraternity, CSUN abolished hazing from any on campus organizations/clubs.

=== Events ===
==== Noontime Concerts ====
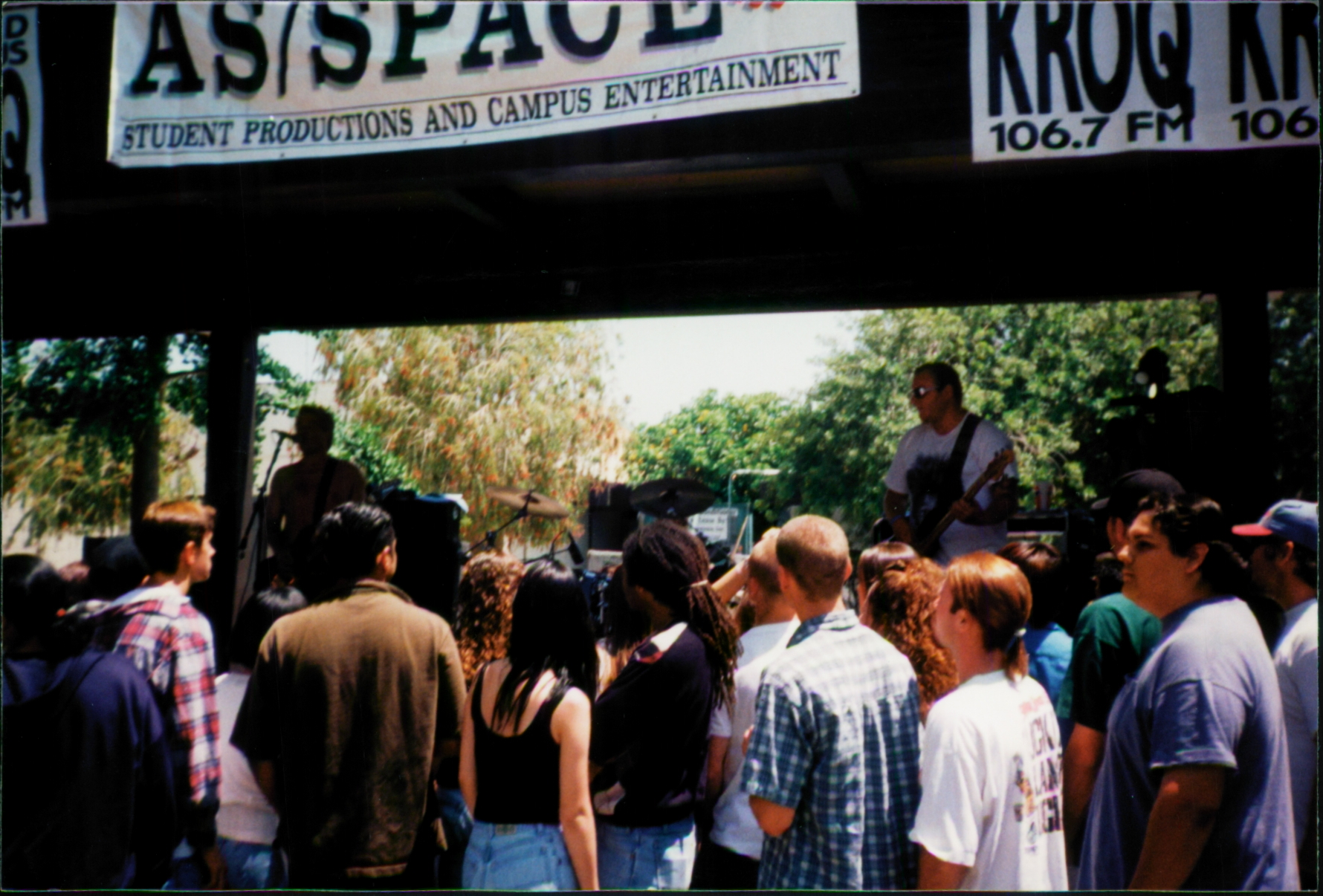
Sublime performing at a Noontime concert at the CSUN University Student Union

The AS/SPACE (Associated Students / Student Productions and Campus Entertainment) produced a weekly concert series held on Wednesdays at noon in the quad of the University Student Union. Nationally known musical artists and bands have performed there, including Bone Thugs-n-Harmony and Red Hot Chili Peppers.

==== Big Show ====
The Associated Students has organized the Big Show, a concert where various musicians perform on the Oviatt Lawn (also referred to as the University Library Lawn), since 2001. Headliners over the years have included Ne-Yo, Ludacris, Diplo, Afrojack, Big Sean, Tyga, Dillon Francis, Louis the Child, ASAP Ferg, Steve Aoki, Deorro, and Galantis.

Swae Lee headlined the Fall 2026 edition of Big Show.

==== Big Lecture ====
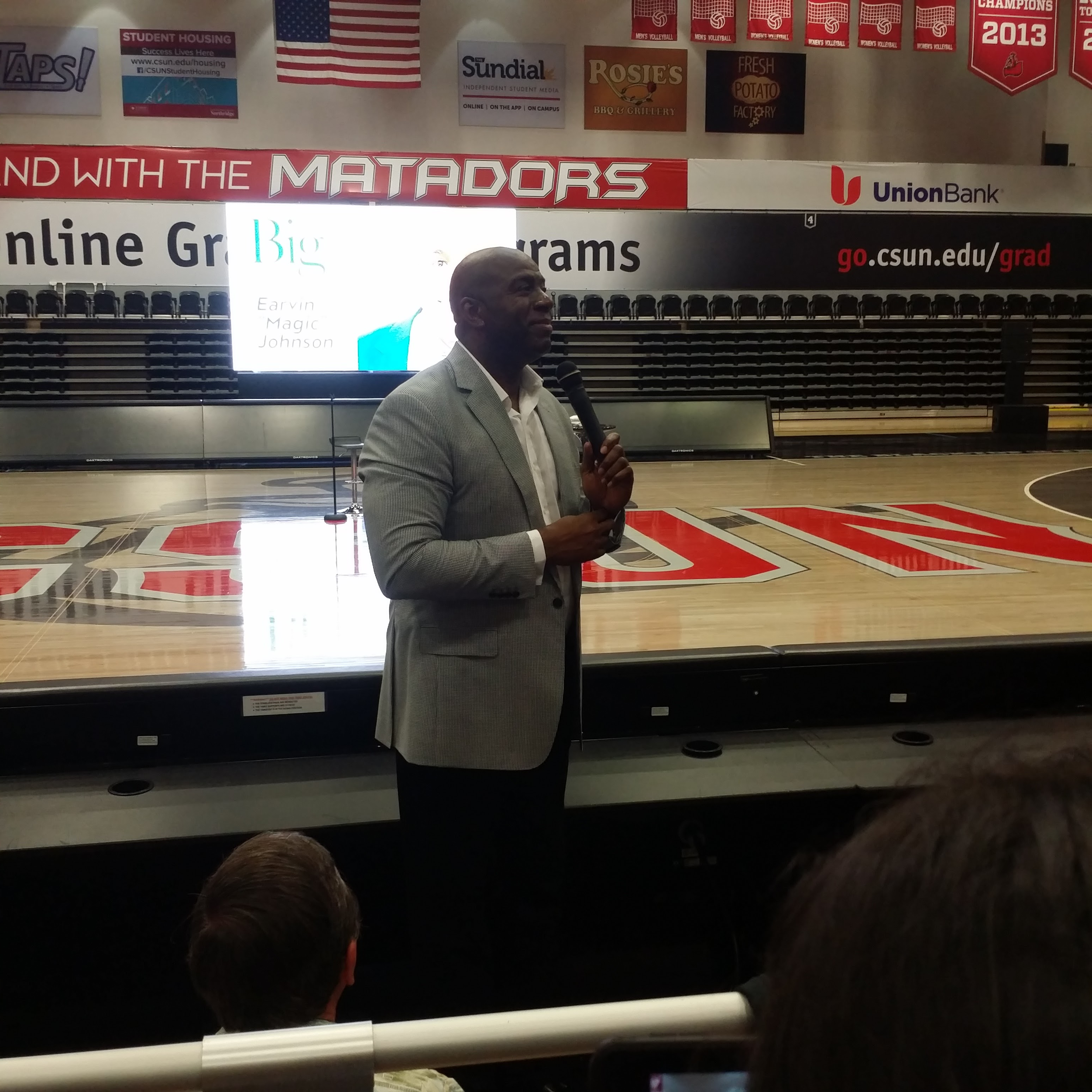
Magic Johnson talks at CSUN's Big Lecture

Since 2011, the Associated Students also started organizing the Big Lecture series, where influential individuals tell the audience about their experiences and careers. Because of the success of the first lecture by Dr. Cornel West, the series was allowed to continue yearly and has attracted a variety of individuals from different industries and backgrounds. Recent speakers were James Franco, Magic Johnson, Viola Davis, and Laverne Cox.

=== Media ===
- KCSN radio
- The Daily Sundial: college newspaper
- Valley View News: student television station

=== Notable programs ===
==== 3 WINS Fitness ====
3 WINS Fitness, formerly known as 100 Citizens, is a free exercise program in Southern California that offers exercise agendas for local communities. This program is implemented by volunteer kinesiology students attending CSUN. In 2012, the program obtained recognition from the White House, winning Popular Choice award in First Lady Michelle Obama's Let's Move video challenge.

== Notable people ==
CSUN has about 350,000 alumni as of 2019.

=== Alumni ===
==== Politics and government ====
At the national level, CSUN has been home to a former head of the United States Census Bureau (Vincent Barabba), a former Commissioner of the Bureau of Labor Statistics (Kathleen Utgoff), the Program Executive Officer of the Joint Strike Fighter program (Lt Gen Christopher Bogdan), a former member of the Council of Economic Advisers and president of the Federal Reserve Bank of Cleveland (Jerry Jordan), as well as the Ambassador to the Bahamas (Nicole Avant), Governor of Hawaii (Linda Lingle), and Lieutenant Governor of California (Mike Curb). In 2018, alumnus Katie Hill became a member of the United States House of Representatives, and the following year graduate Nury Martinez became the first Latina president of the Los Angeles City Council. On January 20, 2021, alumnus Doug Emhoff became the first Second Gentleman of the United States as he is the spouse of former Vice President of the United States Kamala Harris.

==== Business ====
CSUN alumni founded Artsy (Wendi Deng Murdoch, co-founded), Haas Automation and Haas F1 Team (Gene Haas), PennyMac Financial Services (Stanford Kurland), and SM Entertainment (Lee Soo-man).

Alumni are or have been CEO of A+E Global Media (Paul Buccieri), the Alfa Group Consortium (Stan Polovets), Autodesk (Andrew Anagnost), Hilton Worldwide (Stephen Bollenbach), and Houlihan Lokey (Scott Beiser).

Alumnus Charles Noski has been a director at Wells Fargo and Microsoft, while also having served as CFO for Bank of America, Northrop Grumman, and AT&T.

==== Entertainment and the arts ====
In entertainment, former students have won:

- 2 Academy Awards by Richard Dreyfuss and Michelle Mizner and 1 Academy Honorary Award by Diane Warren
- 15 Emmy Awards by Paula Abdul (2x), Phil Hartman (1x), Brian A. Miller (11x), and Diane Warren (1x)
- 6 Golden Globes by Richard Dreyfuss (1x), Jenna Elfman (1x), Don Hahn (2x), and Diane Warren (2x)
- 21 Grammy Awards by Paula Abdul (1x), John Densmore as drummer of The Doors (1x), Michelle DeYoung (3x), Daryl Dragon as part of Captain & Tennille (1x), Mike Elizondo (3x), Gordon Goodwin (4x), Cheech Marin (1x), Andy Summers as guitarist of The Police (5x), Serj Tankian as frontman of System of a Down (1x), and Diane Warren (1x)

Although former student Debra Winger was nominated three times for the Academy Award for Best Actress as well as nominated five times for Golden Globe Awards, she won none of the nominations. Actresses Alyson Hannigan and Eva Longoria also graduated from CSUN and received People's Choice Awards for their roles in How I Met Your Mother and Desperate Housewives, respectively.

==== Literature and journalism ====
Three Pulitzer Prize winners have attended CSUN: Frank del Olmo (for Public Service), Paul Pringle (for Public Service and for Investigative Reporting), and Ken Lubas (photojournalist). Journalist and political commentator Ana Kasparian of The Young Turks network also graduated from CSUN.

==== Sciences ====
In the sciences, CSUN alumni include astronaut Scott J. Horowitz, who flew four Space Shuttle missions, and Adriana Ocampo, who is a planetary geologist known for her contributions to the discovery of the Chicxulub crater as well as her work as Science Program Manager at NASA and lead program executive for the New Frontiers Program.

==== Athletics ====
Former students have also won 15 Olympic medals in total, with Jeanette Bolden (gold medal), Valerie Brisco-Hooks (three gold medals and one silver medal), Alice Brown (two gold medals and one silver medal), Florence Griffith Joyner (three gold medals and two silver medals), Joe Ryan (silver medal), and Bob Samuelson (bronze medal) all winning medals at the Olympic Games. The former four were all coached by alumnus Bob Kersee.

CSUN has also seen alumni Jason Thompson and Robert Fick become MLB All-Stars, while Adam Kennedy was named the ALCS MVP in 2002.

=== Faculty and staff ===
In politics, three former faculty and staff members have become high-ranking officials in foreign countries, including Mohamed Morsi who became the 5th President of Egypt in 2012, as well as Mohammad Qayoumi and Prakash Chandra Lohani. Additionally, former head of the United States Census Bureau Roy Peel and former Ambassador to Mexico Julian Nava were professors at the university. James Lawson, a civil rights leader, was a visiting scholar at the university from 2010 until his death in 2024.

Lucille Ball was an assistant professor in 1979 and James Dickey, United States Poet Laureate and winner of a National Book Award for Poetry, was a visiting lecturer at the university.

The university has also had two prominent mathematicians in its faculty: Lorraine Foster, who became the first woman to receive a Ph.D. in mathematics from California Institute of Technology, and William Karush, a mathematician known for Karush–Kuhn–Tucker conditions and physicist on the Manhattan Project. Faculty members Maria Elena Zavala and Stephen Oppenheimer received the Presidential Award for Excellence in Science, Mathematics, and Engineering Mentoring.

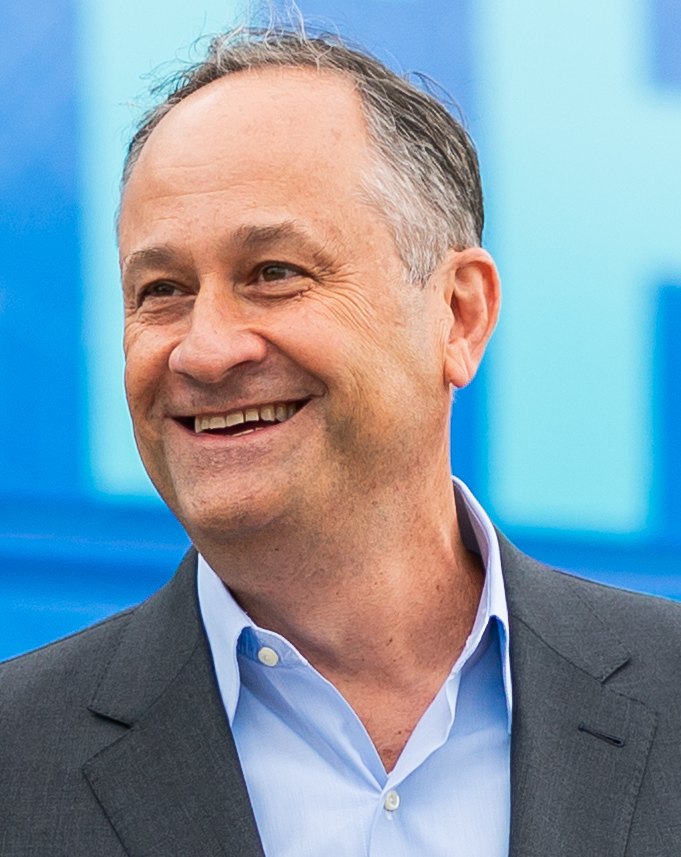
Doug Emhoff, former Second Gentleman of the United States

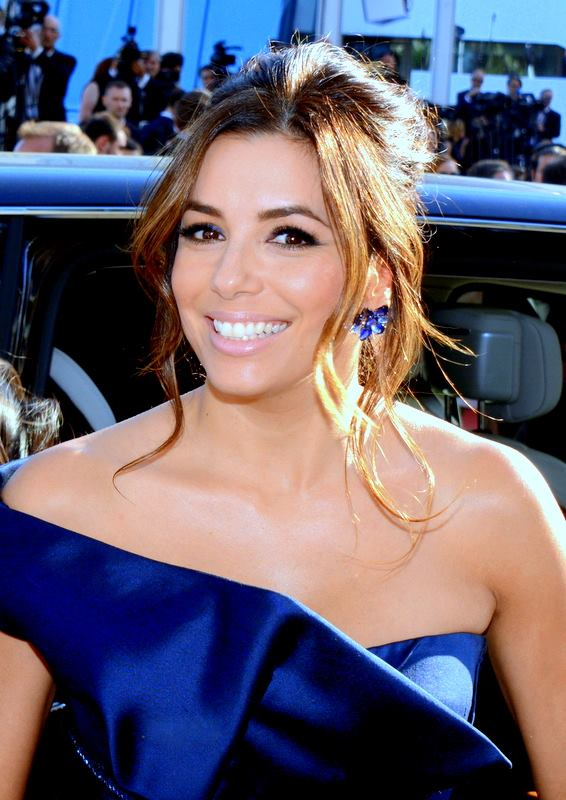
Eva Longoria, award-winning actress

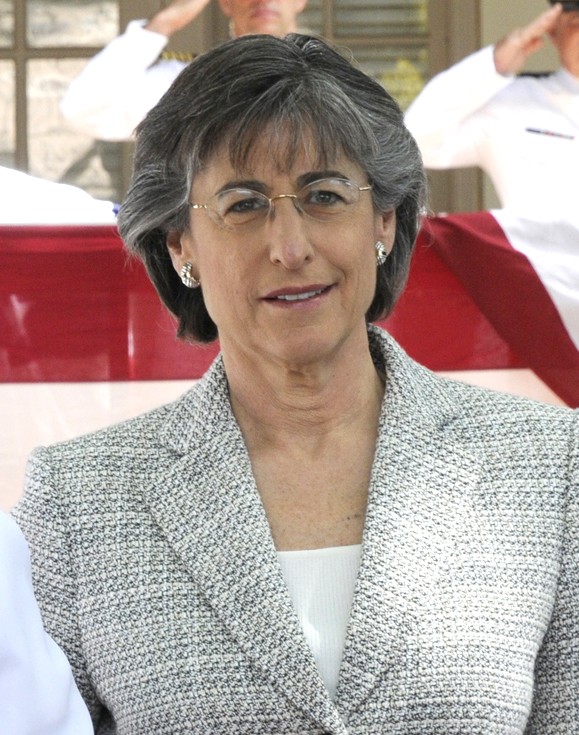
Linda Lingle, 6th Governor of Hawaii

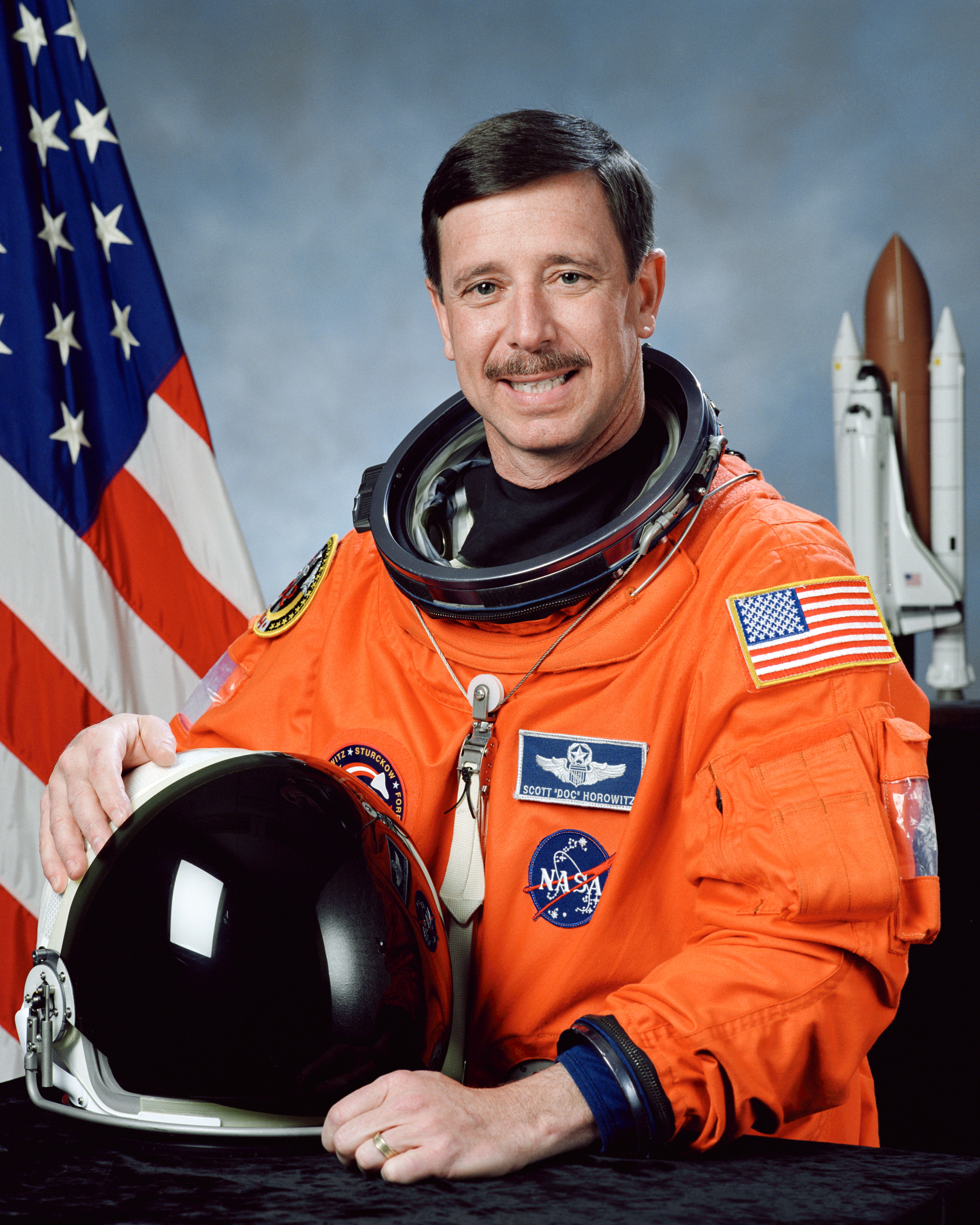
Scott J. Horowitz, NASA astronaut

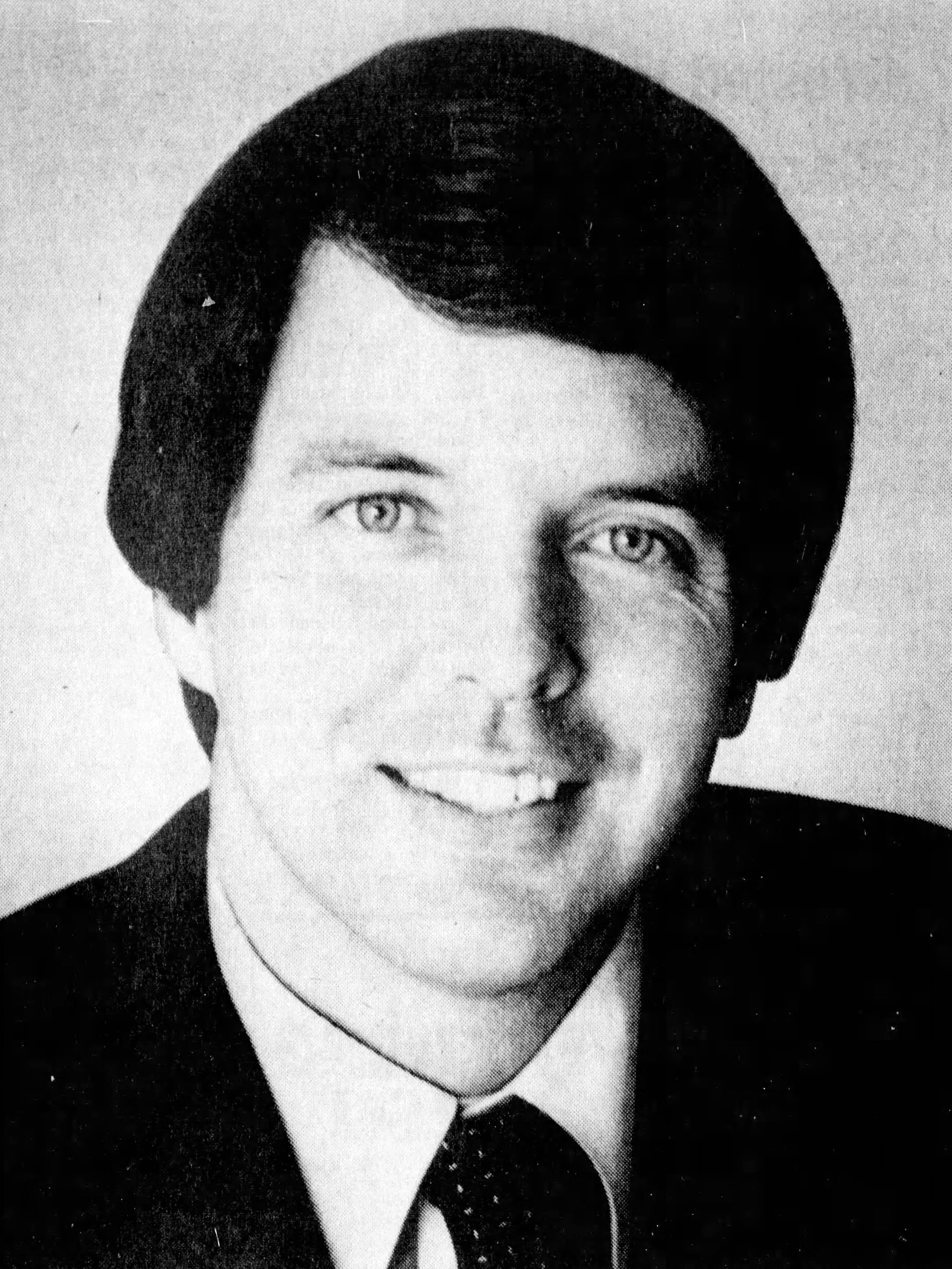
Mike Curb, 42nd Lieutenant Governor of California and musician

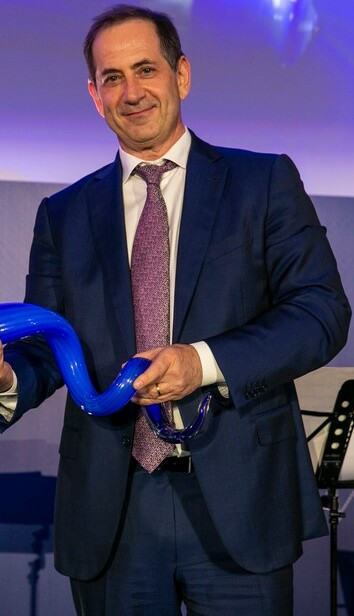
Stan Polovets, former CEO of the Alfa Group Consortium and current CEO of the Genesis Prize Foundation

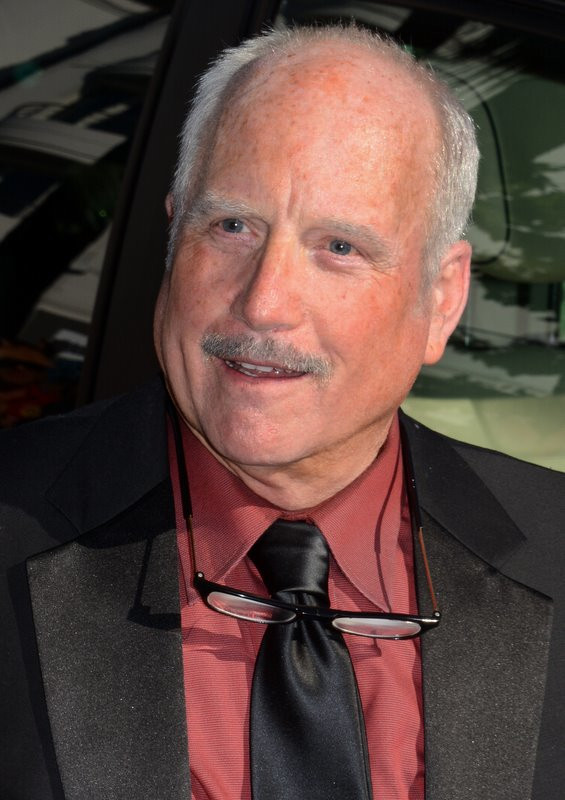
Richard Dreyfuss, Academy Award–winning actor

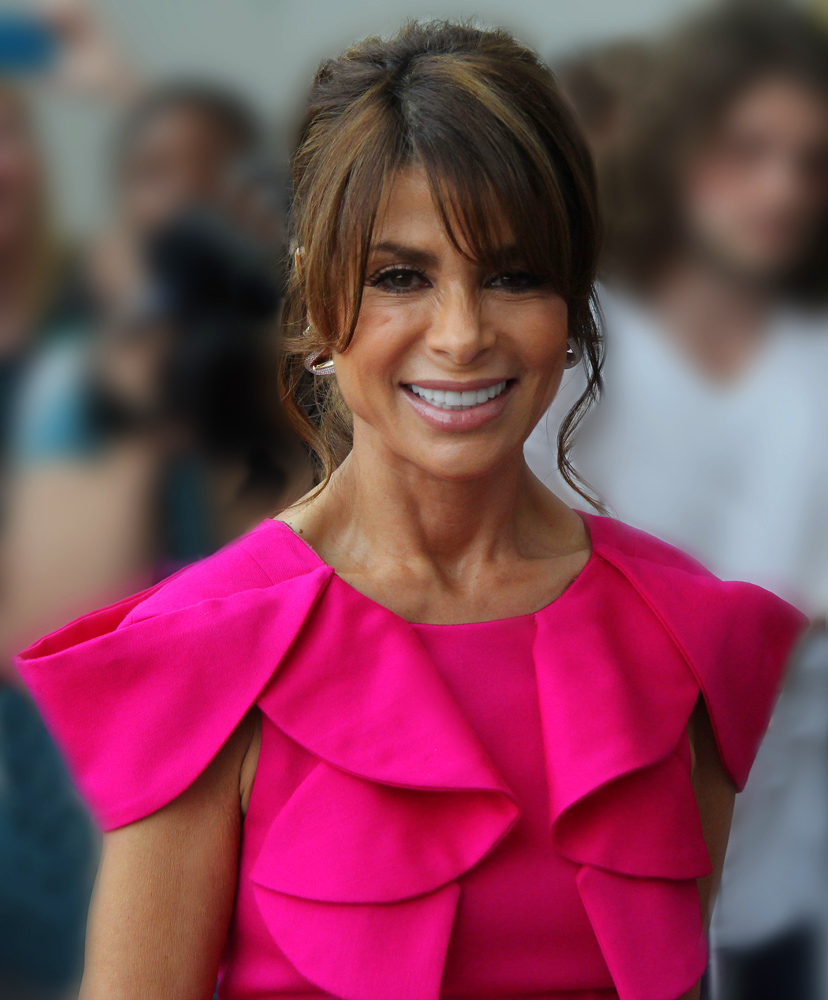
Paula Abdul, Emmy and Grammy Award-winning singer and choreographer

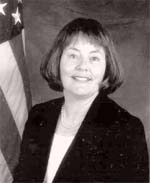
Kathleen Utgoff, former Commissioner of the Bureau of Labor Statistics
