= CSUN Assistive Technology Conference =

Conference on accessibility technology

The National Center on Deafness hosts the International Conference on Technology and Persons with Disabilities. Commonly known as the CSUN Conference, the world's largest event dedicated to exploring new ways technology can assist people with disabilities. California State University, Northridge has acted as a host of this conference since its inception. For many years it was held in San Diego but the event location has now moved to Anaheim.

The CSUN Conference was built to be an event for researchers, practitioners, exhibitors, end users, speakers and other participants to share knowledge and best practices in the field of assistive technology. The event is attended by accessibility experts, advocates, people with disabilities, governments and business.

The CSUN Conference is now one of many around the world. Other notable accessibility events include the M-Enabling Summit Conference and Showcase, the Assistive Technology Industry Association Conference, the National Federation of the Blind National Convention and the American Council of the Blind Annual Conference and Convention.
