= Andrew Anagnost =

American engineer and business executive

Andrew Anagnost is the President and CEO of Autodesk, having been appointed to the positions in 2017. He took over the positions from Carl Bass, who resigned in February 2017. Before the promotion, he had served in various other roles for the company since joining in 1997. He holds degrees from California State University, Northridge and Stanford University.

== Early life and education ==
Anagnost grew up in Van Nuys, California and initially dropped out of high school. After issues with legal and educational authorities, his family helped him enroll in a new high school and he went on to graduate. Afterwards, Anagnost went on to earn a bachelor's degree in mechanical engineering from California State University, Northridge (CSUN) in 1987. His mother, sister, and brother also graduated from CSUN. During his bachelor's degree, Anagnost completed an internship at Lockheed Martin. He later obtained an MS in engineering science and a PhD in aeronautical engineering with a minor in computer science from Stanford University.

== Career ==
Following graduation from his bachelor's, Anagnost initially worked as a composites structure engineer and propulsion installation engineer at Lockheed Martin, where he had previously interned. He left the position to pursue his further education at Stanford, leading to a position at the NASA Ames Research Center as a National Research Council post-doctoral fellow. Finding the aeronautics business 'too slow', he joined the Exa Corporation in Boston in 1992, before joining Autodesk as a product manager in 1997.

Early on in his career at Autodesk, he led development of the company’s manufacturing products and increased the revenue of Autodesk Inventor five-fold to more than $500 million. Working his way up through the company over the years, he achieved the position of Chief Marketing Officer and SVP of the Business Strategy & Marketing. In these roles, he was credited with Autodesk's transition to software as a service, as well as the adoption of cloud computing.

Following the resignation of Carl Bass, Anagnost was appointed as interim-CEO together with Amar Hanspal, the Chief Product Officer. Following a four month search, Anagnost was permanently appointed as President and CEO of the company. In this role, Anagnost has pushed for a refocus of the company on software for construction, leading to the demise of some other company ventures and a workforce slash which saw 1,200 employees lose their job at the company. As part of the new focus, Autodesk acquired construction tech start-ups PlanGrid for $875 million, the company's biggest ever acquisition, and BuildingConnected for $275 million in 2018. Additionally, since becoming CEO, the company's share price has nearly tripled and Autodesk has reached a market value of $41.1B, entering the Forbes Global 2000 and Fortune 500.

== Personal life and philanthropy ==
Growing up, Anagnost's dream job was to work on space ships for NASA. He enjoys reading science fiction novels, with The Fountains of Paradise being one of his favorite works, and is a fan of both the Star Wars and Star Trek franchises.

In 2018, Anagnost was one of the judges in the Annual Engineering Showcase at his alma mater CSUN and hosted a talk at the university. The following year he was rewarded with the 2019 Distinguished Alumni Award from CSUN. That same year, Anagnost and his wife donated $300,000 to the university to establish the Teresa Sendra-Anagnost Memorial Scholarship Endowment in honor of his mother, who died in 2011 after suffering complications from cardiac surgery. The endowment supports outstanding students in the university's College of Engineering and Computer Science through funding of their education. Autodesk also donated $1 million to CSUN in 2020 to support the founding and construction of a Center for Integrated Design and Advanced Manufacturing at the university.

In 2025, the CSUN College of Engineering & Computer Science was renamed the Andrew J. Anagnost College of Engineering & Computer Science after Anagnost donated $20 million to the university.
