= Frank del Olmo =

American journalist

- Born: Frank Phillip del Olmo; May 18, 1948; Los Angeles, California
- Died: February 19, 2004 (aged 55); Los Angeles, California
- Education: California State University, Northridge
- Occupations: editor, columnist, reporter
- Spouse: Karen King 1970 - 1982, Alice Frawley (Alice Frawley Bicksler) 1984 - 1990, Magdalena Beltran - del Olmo 1991 - 2004
- Children: 2
- Writing career
- Language: English, Spanish
- Subjects: Latinos, autism
- Notable work: Latinos
- Notable awards: 1975 Emmy Award; 1984 Pulitzer Prize for Public Service; Nieman Fellowship 1987–1988

Frank del Olmo (May 18, 1948 — February 19, 2004) was an editor, columnist and reporter for the Los Angeles Times, where he started as an intern in 1970. He graduated magna cum laude from California State University, Northridge with a degree in journalism in the same year and was recognized as both the outstanding journalism graduate and the outstanding overall graduate. He continued to work at the Los Angeles Times until he died of a heart attack in his office 34 years later. During his career, he received an Emmy Award, the Pulitzer Prize for Public Service and the non-degree Nieman Fellowship at Harvard University.

== Early life and education ==
Del Olmo's father left the household soon after his birth, causing him to be raised by his mother, siblings and other family members. Del Olmo tried to enlist in the U.S. Air Force after graduation at the height of the Vietnam War but was rejected from becoming a fighter pilot because he did not satisfy the eyesight requirements. Instead, he received a full scholarship to study journalism at UCLA, but he was forced to continue his studies elsewhere when the journalism department closed two years later. Del Olmo transferred to California State University, Northridge and finished his journalism degree magna cum laude there in 1970. He was also recognized as both the outstanding journalism graduate and the outstanding overall graduate and started an internship during that summer at the Los Angeles Times, where he was mentored by Ruben Salazar.

Originally, del Olmo had the intention to attend Columbia University for a master's program in journalism on a full scholarship. This plan was quickly abandoned when the Chicano Moratorium started a march through East Los Angeles on August 29, 1970. His mentor, Ruben Salazar, was killed. Del Olmo canceled his scholarship to Columbia to continue Ruben's work at the Los Angeles Times.

== Work ==
In 1972, del Olmo was the co-founder of the California Chicano News Media Association. He won an Emmy Award a few years later for "The Unwanted", a documentary on illegal immigration written by del Olmo. Throughout his work at the Los Angeles Times (and especially when he became a columnist in 1980), he wrote about and advocated on topics such as illegal immigration, issues affecting the Latino community, city policies, pop culture, and even baseball. Frank chaired a 1982 meeting of Latino journalists which led to the creation of the National Association of Hispanic Journalists in 1984.

Del Olmo and his team received the 1984 Pulitzer Prize for Public Service for their work on the 27-story Latinos series, a pathbreaking survey of southern California's Latino community and culture in the early 1980s. Thereafter, he was a Nieman Fellow at Harvard University during the 1987-1988 academic year.

Del Olmo had a son in 1992, named Frank, who was diagnosed with autism in 1994. This led to del Olmo writing columns on autism in 1995, a topic he eventually wrote 10 columns about.

Having already been the first Latino to be listed on the newspaper's masthead (as assistant to the editor in 1989), Del Olmo was promoted to associate editor in 1998. Another major milestone before his death was his induction into the National Association of Hispanic Journalists Hall of Fame in 2002. Previously, del Olmo held positions as an "intern, a staff writer specializing in Latino issues and Latin American affairs, an editorial writer, deputy editor of the editorial page, a Times-Mirror Foundation director and an assistant to the editor of The Times."

== Death ==
On February 19, 2004, del Olmo collapsed in his office at the Los Angeles Times and was pronounced dead of a heart attack at Good Samaritan Hospital.

== Legacy ==
In 2006, the Frank del Olmo Elementary School in Los Angeles (near Koreatown) was named in his honor. The dedication ceremony was attended by his wife, son, and daughter, as well as then Mayor Antonio Villaraigosa.

Frank del Olmo's archives reside in the University Library at California State University, Northridge.
