= National Center on Deafness =

American educational institution

The National Center on Deafness is an American educational institution aimed at facilitating the education of deaf students. The facilities of the National Center on Deafness are located on the campus of California State University, Northridge, Los Angeles, California. Each year the university hosts the International Conference on Technology and Persons with Disabilities.

== History ==
=== Founding ===
The NCOD was founded in the 1960s, on the site of the former San Fernando Valley State College (SFVSC) in Northridge, Los Angeles. In 1960, the John Tracy Clinic received a planning grant to develop a "Leadership Training Program in the Area of the Deaf". Wayne F. McIntire, of San Fernando Valley State College, assisted by Ray L. Jones and Edgar Lowell of the Tracy Clinic, directed the development of an interdisciplinary curriculum in leadership training. The program is housed in the School of Education.

In 1962, The National Leadership Training Program was established on campus by a federal grant to train administrative personnel concerned with rehabilitation of the deaf. Master's degrees were presented to ten participants, and adult education classes were set up at a local church.

In 1964, the NLTP admitted its first two deaf students and provided them with interpreters and notetakers for full access to university classes. The program developed telephone communication devices enabling deaf and deaf-blind person to make limited use of telephone; in 1965 they began to train deaf and deaf-blind persons in its use. That year NLTP-D hired its first deaf staff member.

By 1968, thirty-three deaf students were enrolled at SFVSC; funding for support services, which had previously come from community service clubs, was taken over by the local vocational rehabilitation office. That year the Department of Special Education established credit courses in American Sign Language and Interpreting.

In 1969, the NCOD received a "block funding grant" from the California State Department of Rehabilitation. Another grant allowed the initiation of a program to prepare teachers of the deaf at the secondary level.

In 1970, the Drama Department at SFVSC offered a "Sign Language and Drama" course. That year SFVSC received a grant from the Bureau of Adult Vocational and Library Programs for "Project DAWN" (Deaf Adults With Need) to establish adult basic education programs across the country by training local deaf leaders. This model was later expanded to include other disabled groups.

That year SFVSC sponsored a national workshop and several regional workshops designed to bring together parents of deaf persons, deaf adults, and rehabilitation workers. The Department of Special Education and Rehabilitation initiated a summer Master's program designed to allow teachers of the deaf, particularly deaf teachers, to earn an MA degree through summer residency plus extension courses. By 1971, the entire curriculum of the college was opened to deaf and hard of hearing students.

=== Renaming ===
On June 1, 1972, the college was renamed California State University, Northridge; by then the Fall enrollment of deaf students exceeded one hundred for the first time. Pursuant to Assembly Bill 1923, the Trustee's Committee on Educational Policy designates CSUN as a professional center for training deaf persons; CSUN administration then established a "Center on Deafness" to coordinate the various training and support programs. The Department of Special Education and Rehabilitation appointed a deaf professor as head of the Teacher Preparation Program.

In 1973, CSUN awarded a master's degree to its 100th deaf graduate. In 1974, the Center on Deafness initiated a "Visiting Deaf Professor" lectureship, and deaf teachers from other colleges and universities were invited to spend a semester at CSUN to teach, study, and write. A new "Law and the Handicapped" summer workshop was offered on campus. CSUN joined a "National Interpreter Training Consortium" to meet the need for training interpreters across the country.

In 1976, the Center on Deafness initiated a publication series: Selected Readings in the Integration of Deaf Students at CSUN, Sign Language Theater and Deaf Theater: New Definitions and Directions. The center collaborated with IBM Corporation to plan a "New Careers in Business for the Deaf" program.

In 1977, CSUN awarded its 200th MA degree to a deaf person. That year the center reorganized, adding a Planning and Evaluation Unit, Administrative Services Unit, and Faculty Liaison person. Center on Deafness administrators testified before the House and Senate Subcommittee on Handicapped. The California State Department of Rehabilitation awarded a contract to the center to establish a Telecommunications Center.

=== National focus ===
In 1978, the center's name was changed to the National Center on Deafness, and plans were made for a building on the CSUN campus. A Telecommunications Center honoring the memory of Alexander Graham Bell was set up. In 1980, a deaf student organization, Deaf CSUNians, was established.

In 1982, NCOD won the G. Theodore Mitau Award. A Deaf Fraternity, Delta Sigma Phi, was set up at CSUN. The center held its first annual NCOD Awards Ceremony, and also hosted a week-long Interpreter Faire, attracting about 80 local interpreters.

In 1984, about 200 Deaf and Hard of Hearing students were enrolled at the center. Three years later the center initiated a study of attrition rates among deaf students in the sciences.

Starting in 1987, Deaf CSUNians have decorated a float for the Tournament of Roses Parade. Tradition continues to the present. In 1988, NCOD won the first Deaf Students College Bowl held between CSUN, Gallaudet University, and The National Technical Institute for the Deaf. In 1988, a Deaf sorority, Alpha Sigma Theta, was set up at CSUN.

=== New home ===
In 1989, the center was housed in a new building, Jeanne M. Chisholm Hall, donated by Grace Petri in memory of her sister. The center became part of the School of Education. In 1991, a Regional Outreach Program was established by the NCOD to serve colleges and universities in Arizona, California, Texas, New Mexico, and Nevada; several more states were later added.

In 1992, NCOD hosted an exhibition of artwork by deaf children in China. During the next year, Lambda Sigma Pi Fraternity was founded.

In 1994, the center received a $1 million grant from the U.S. Department of Education. The Deaf Studies BA program was installed into the CSU system by 2008.

The center was presented with a $50,000 donation from the Reseda Valley Women's Club to endow a scholarship.

In 2012, students from the Center participated in police training exercises to simulate interactions between officers and deaf people at crime scenes.

By 2017, approximately 200 deaf and hard of hearing students were attending CSUN each semester and register through the National Center on Deafness to receive services such as interpreting, realtime captioning, typewell, notetaking, tutoring and academic advisement.

== CSUN Campus Services ==
The main purpose of the NCOD is to provide services for deaf students that want to attend CSUN. Some of the services that they provide are interpreters, note takers, closed captioning, and transcription.

So that students can participate the culture and the language of Deaf people, academic advisors who know American Sign Language are available in the CSUN Education Building, for both deaf and hearing students. NCOD also provides guidance services and some scholarships for students who are applying for admission to CSUN.

Beginning in 1978, the NCOD accumulated a large collection of deaf-centered books and audio-visual materials that cover the history, culture, and societal treatment of the deaf community. In 2016, the NCOD collection was moved from the NCOD building to CSUN'S University Library.
