= Soka University of America =

Private university in Aliso Viejo, California, US

- Former name: Soka University of Los Angeles (1987–1991)
- Motto: "Be philosophers of a renaissance of life; Be world citizens in solidarity for peace; Be the pioneers of a global civilization."
- Type: Private liberal arts college
- Established: 1987; 39 years ago
- Founder: Daisaku Ikeda
- Accreditation: WSCUC
- Religious affiliation: Buddhism (Soka Gakkai)
- Endowment: $1.2 billion (2020)
- President: Edward M. Feasel
- Faculty: 71
- Students: 495
- Undergraduates: 445 (fall 2022)
- Postgraduates: 10 (fall 2022)
- Location: Aliso Viejo, California, United States; 33°33′18″N 117°44′06″W
- Campus: 103 acres (42 ha); Large Suburb
- Colors: Royal Blue, White and Gold
- Nickname: Lions
- Sporting affiliations: NAIA – GSAC (primary); NAIA – PCSC (swimming)
- Mascot: Lion
- Website: www.soka.edu

Soka University of America (SUA) is a private liberal arts college in Aliso Viejo, California. Originally founded in 1987 by Daisaku Ikeda, the founder of the Soka Gakkai International Buddhist movement, it was established on its current campus in 2001. Despite its affiliation with Soka Gakkai, It maintains a secular curriculum. In addition to its main campus in Aliso Viejo, SUA owns the Monterey Institute of International Studies in Monterey.

== History and philosophy ==
SUA is a secular college founded by Daisaku Ikeda, the President of Soka Gakkai International (SGI). SUA's philosophical foundation originated in the work of Tsunesaburō Makiguchi, who was the first President of Soka Gakkai and created a society for educators dedicated to social and educational reform in Japan during the years leading up to World War II.

== Links with Soka Gakkai ==
It is not mandatory to join the Buddhist faith upon entering SUA. However, the university is closely linked to the Soka Gakkai.

A document from the US tax authorities, dated 2012, indicates that the Soka Gakkai University is under the authority of its sole member, the Soka Gakkai. This legal status offers the right "to participate in decisions by the governing body regarding the disposal of all or substantially all of the organization’s assets".

Today, the SUA Board of Directors includes, among others: Tariq Hasan, CEO of SGI-USA; Adin Strauss, General Director of SGI-USA; Yoshiki Tanigawa, listed as a Benefactor of Soka Gakkai.

== Campuses ==
=== Monterey ===
In May 2026, Soka University of America announced that they were in discussions with Middlebury College to purchase the MIIS campus and some of its academic programs. In August 2026, the purchase went through.

Current MIIS students are allowed to finish their programs and graduate with a Middlebury degree, where SUA is also accepting applications for the Fall 2027 cohort at the newly renamed Monterey Institute of International Studies at Soka University of America (MIIS).

=== Calabasas ===
In 1987, SUA was formed as a not-for-profit organization incorporated in the state of California. Initially it was a small graduate school located on the 588-acre (2.38 km^{2}) former Gillette−Brown Ranch in Calabasas and the Santa Monica Mountains. Originally the location was the site of pre-Columbian Talepop, a settlement of the Chumash people. It was within the Spanish land grant Rancho Las Virgenes in the 19th century. In the 1920s, it became the rural estate of King Gillette with a mansion designed by Wallace Neff. In 1952, it became the Claretville seminary of the Claretian Order of the Catholic Church, and in 1977 it became the religious center of Elizabeth Clare Prophet and the Church Universal and Triumphant (CUT). In 1986, CUT sold the 219 acres (89 ha) property to Soka University of Japan.

=== Aliso Viejo ===
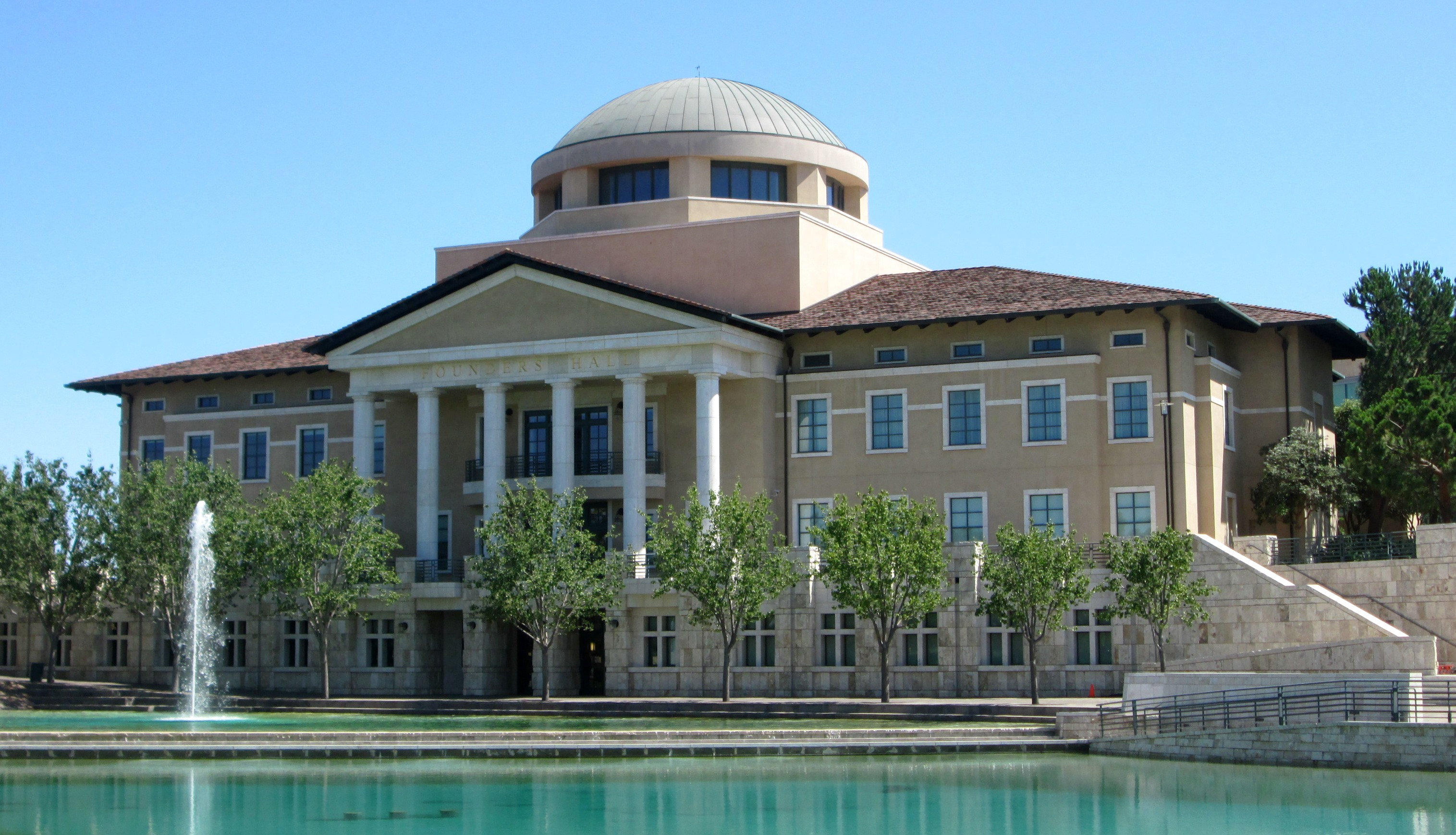
Founders Hall, Aliso Viejo campus.

In 1995, the institution bought 103 acres (0.42 km^{2}) of rough-graded property for $25 million in Aliso Viejo, California, located in southern Orange County. It then spent $265 million to build the first 18 buildings of the new campus, which opened to 120 first year undergraduate students on 24 August 2001. The architecture was designed in a style resembling an Italian hillside village in Tuscany, with red-tiled roofs, stonework, and earth colors. Three academic buildings were named after the founder and Sōka Gakkai's third president Daisaku Ikeda and his wife, Kaneko Ikeda; 20th−century peace activists Linus Pauling and Eva Helen Pauling; and Mohandas Gandhi and Kasturba Gandhi. An additional academic building dedicated in 2012 was named after Nobel Peace Laureate Wangari Maathai.

Since August 2007 the Aliso Viejo campus has been the home for all of SUA's graduate, undergraduate, and research programs. The Aliso Viejo campus is bordered on three sides by Aliso and Wood Canyons Wilderness Park encompassing a 4,000-acre (16 km^{2}) county wildlife sanctuary.

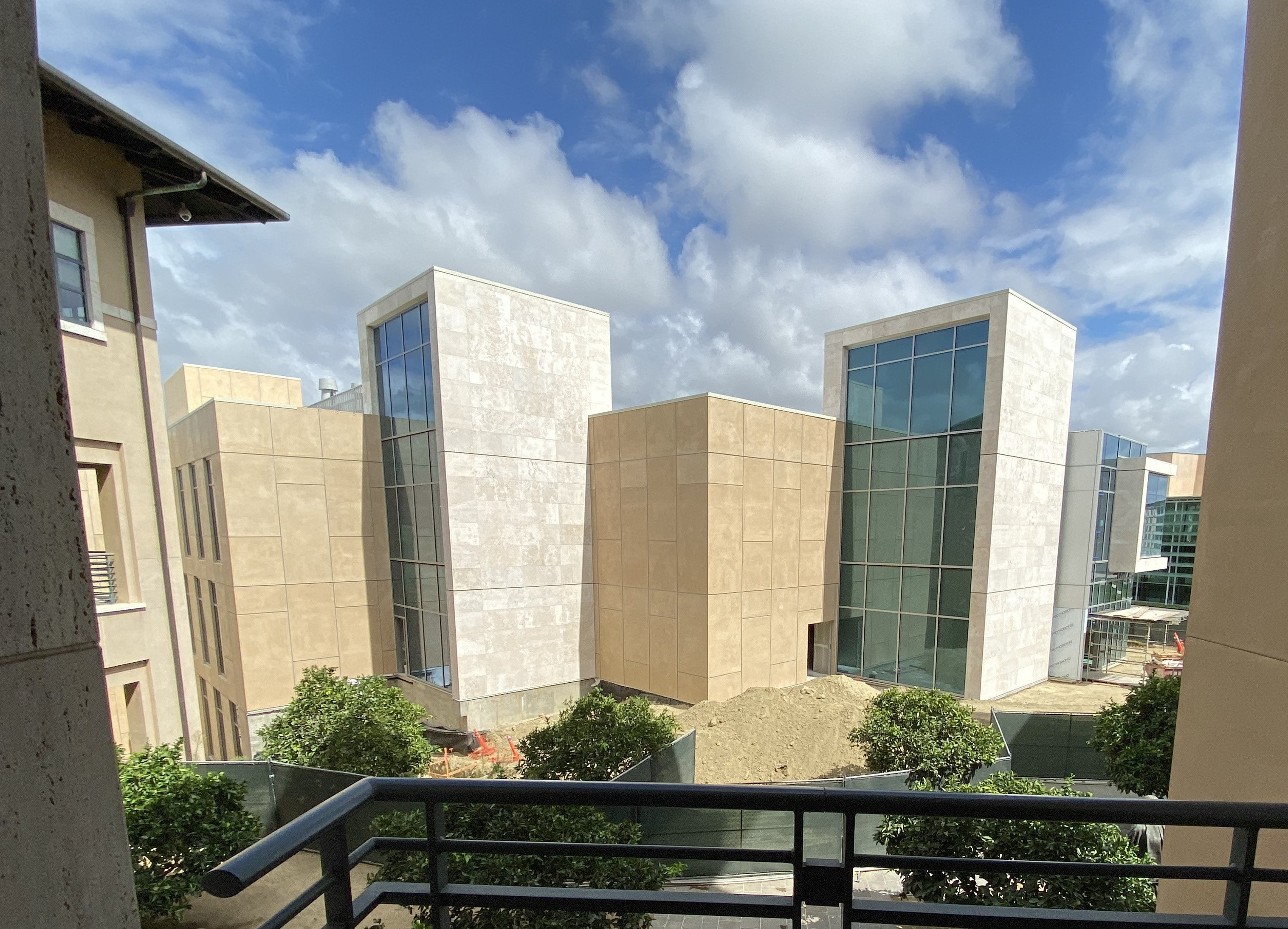
Science Building Construction 2019

== Academics ==
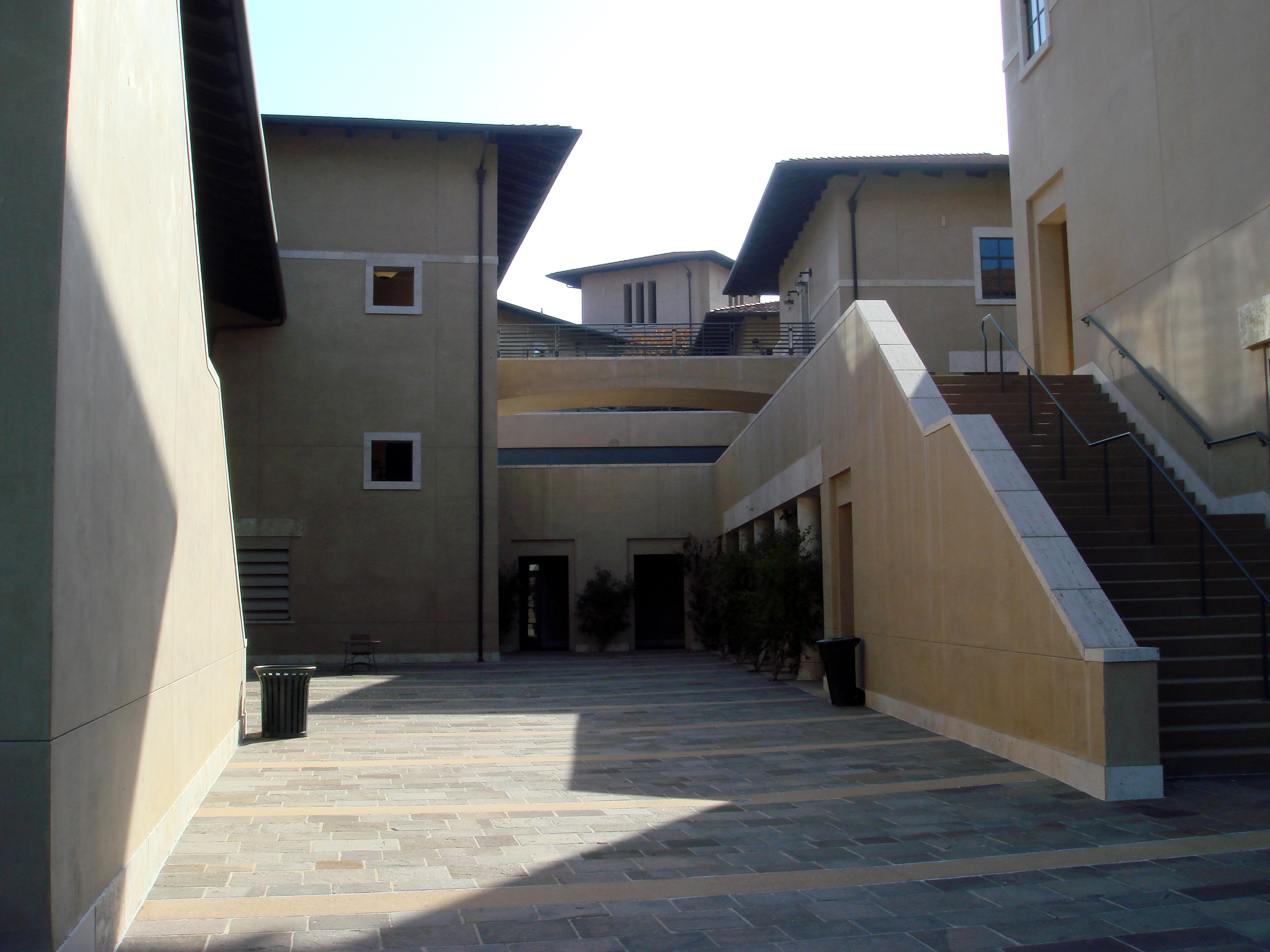
Linus and Ava Helen Pauling Hall

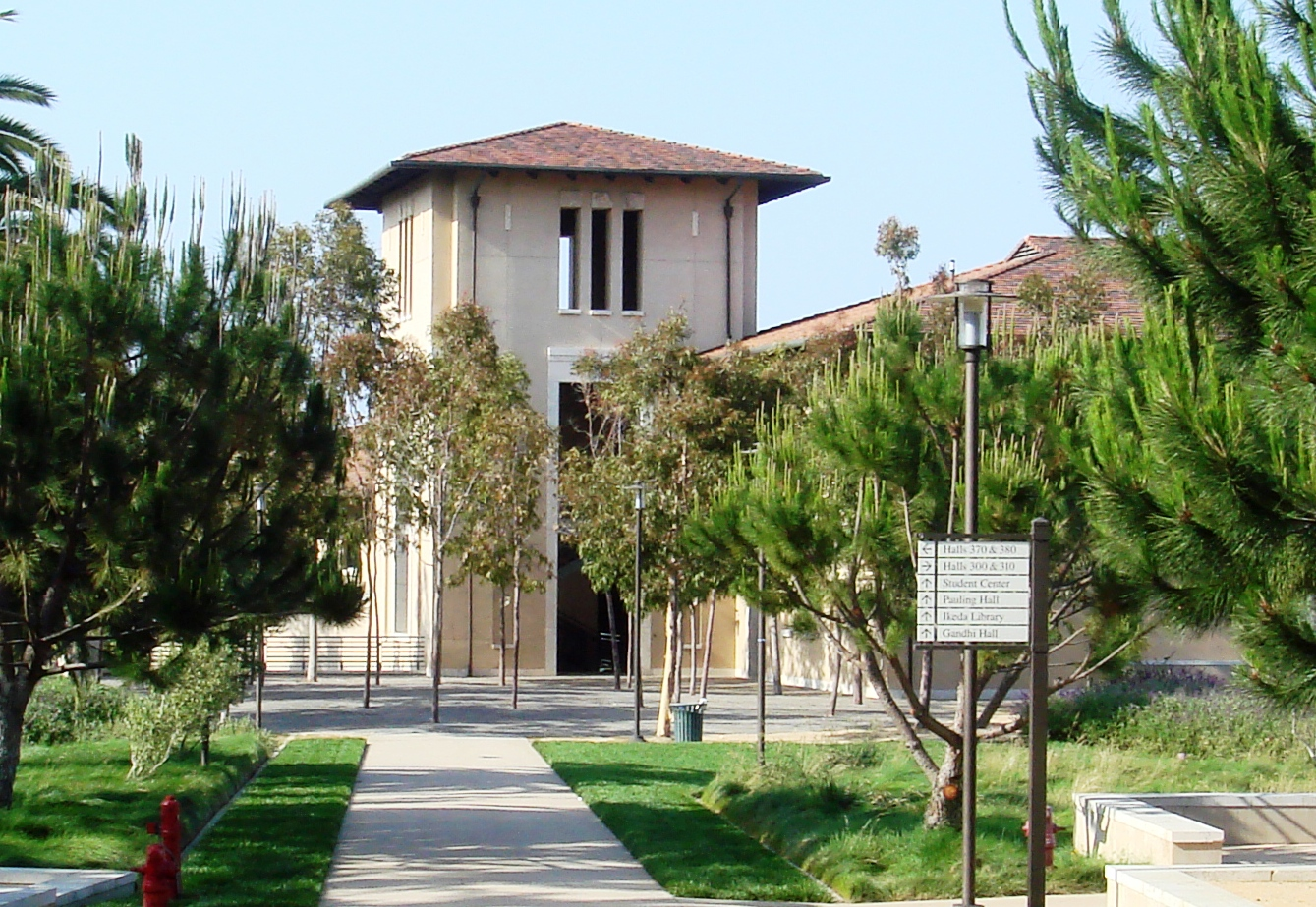
Student Center

The undergraduate college offers a Bachelor of Liberal Arts with emphasis areas in Environmental Studies, Humanities, Social & Behavioral Sciences, International Studies, or Life Sciences. Classrooms typically use seminar methods. The graduate school offers a Master of Arts degree in Educational Leadership and Societal Change.

The Pacific Basin Research Center supports research on the humane and peaceful development of the Asia-Pacific Region, including the Latin American border states. It awards grants and fellowships to researchers studying public policy interactions in the Pacific Rim in such areas as international security, economic and social development, educational and cultural reform, environmental protection and human rights. The center also sponsors campus conferences, occasional lecture series, and student seminars that extend and support its research activities.

The Center for Race, Ethnicity, and Human Rights will host individuals from around the country and the globe who work to increase understanding and progress on addressing the issues confronting society, including global and local ethnic conflict as well as systemic and institutional racism in the United States.

In May 2026, the SUA announced the purchase of the Middlebury Institute of International Studies (MIIS) campus in Monterey, Calif.

=== Rankings ===
Academic rankings

Liberal arts
- U.S. News & World Report: 45
- Washington Monthly: 173

Soka University of America's ranking in the U.S. News & World Report's 2025 edition of Best Colleges is tied for 37th overall among "National Liberal Arts Colleges".

For 2021, Washington Monthly ranked Soka 173rd among liberal arts colleges in the U.S. based on their contribution to the public good, as measured by social mobility, research, and promoting public service.

In 2015, the Christian Science Monitor listed SUA 2nd on a top 10 list of the most globally minded colleges.

It is ranked #367 in the Forbes' "Top Colleges 2026".

=== Curriculum ===
There are no discipline-based departments at Soka University. Instead, the institution has focused on interdisciplinarity. SUA undergraduates get a bachelor's degree in Liberal Arts, while choosing one of five possible concentration tracks:

- Environmental Studies
- Humanities
- International Studies
- Life Sciences
- Social & Behavioral Sciences

SUA encompasses both a liberal arts college and a graduate school offering a master's program in Educational Leadership and Societal Change.

==== Study abroad ====
All undergraduate students at Soka University of America must study a non-native language. The languages offered are Spanish, French, Mandarin Chinese, and Japanese. The language must be studied for two years, then all undergraduate students at Soka University of America study abroad for one semester in the spring or fall of their junior year in a country whose language they are studying.

== Student life ==
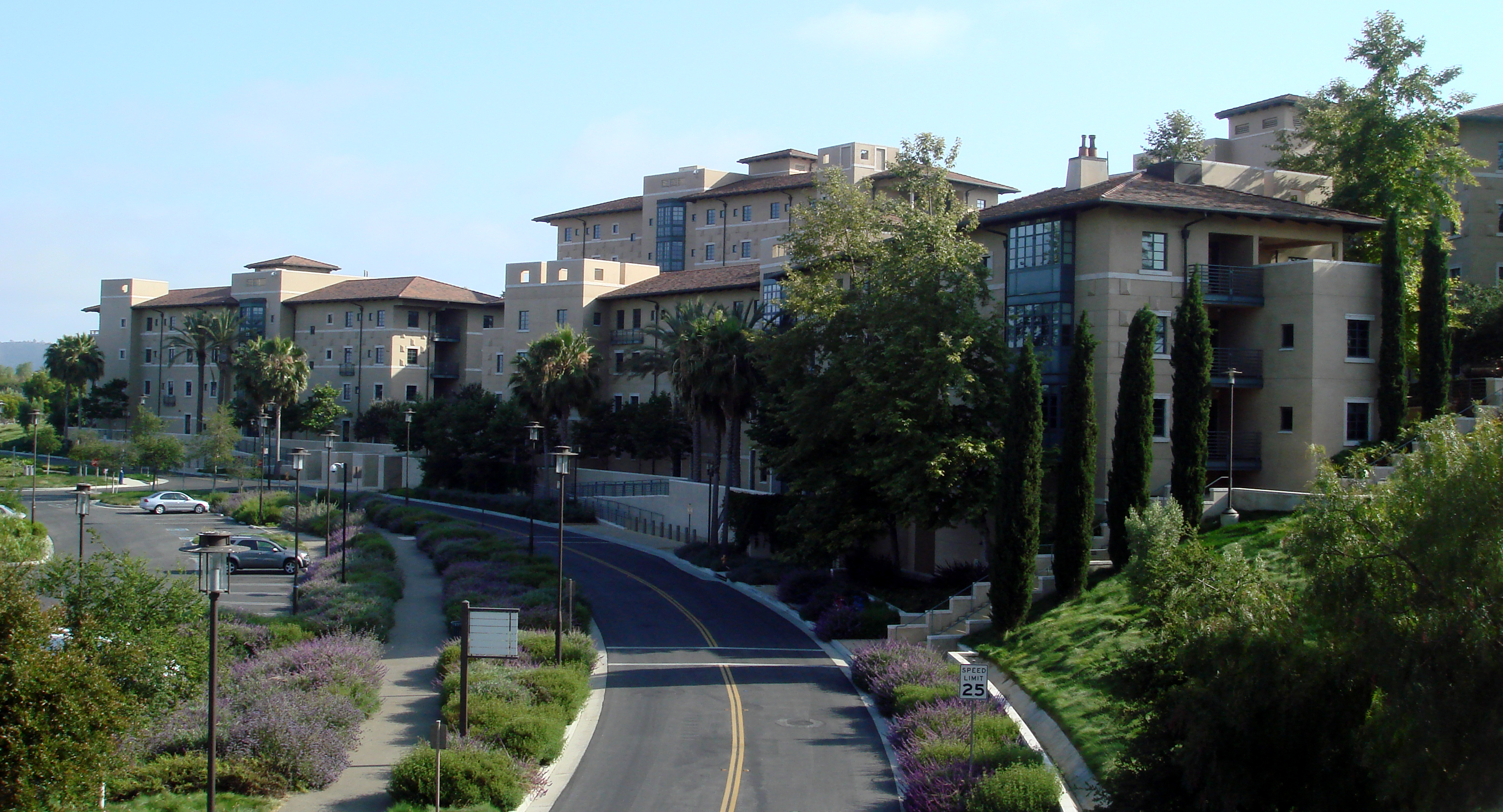
Residence Halls: "Horizon," "Aurora," "Abeona," and "Sunrise"

About 60% of SUA's student body is from the United States, with the other 40% coming from 30 other countries on six continents. In 2021, Soka University was ranked No. 1 in "Most International Students" (highest percentage of international students) among national liberal arts colleges by U.S. News & World Report.

== Athletics ==
The Soka athletic teams are called the Lions. The institution is a member of the National Association of Intercollegiate Athletics (NAIA), primarily competing in the California Pacific Conference (Cal Pac) for most of its sports since the 2012–13 academic year; its men's & women's swimming & diving teams compete in the Pacific Collegiate Swim and Dive Conference (PCSC). The Lions previously competed as an NAIA Independent within the Association of Independent Institutions (AII) from 2008 to 2009 to 2011–12.

Soka competes in nine intercollegiate varsity sports, including for men, cross country, soccer, swimming and diving, and track and field; and for women, cross country, golf, soccer, swimming and diving, and track and field.

== Admissions and graduation rate ==
First-Time, First-Year Student Applicants Acceptance Rates
Class of	Total	In-State	Out-of-State	International
2028	43.62%	76.08%	70.10%	26%
2027	69.52%	69.84%	78.18%	63.35%
2026	56.6%	N/A	N/A	N/A

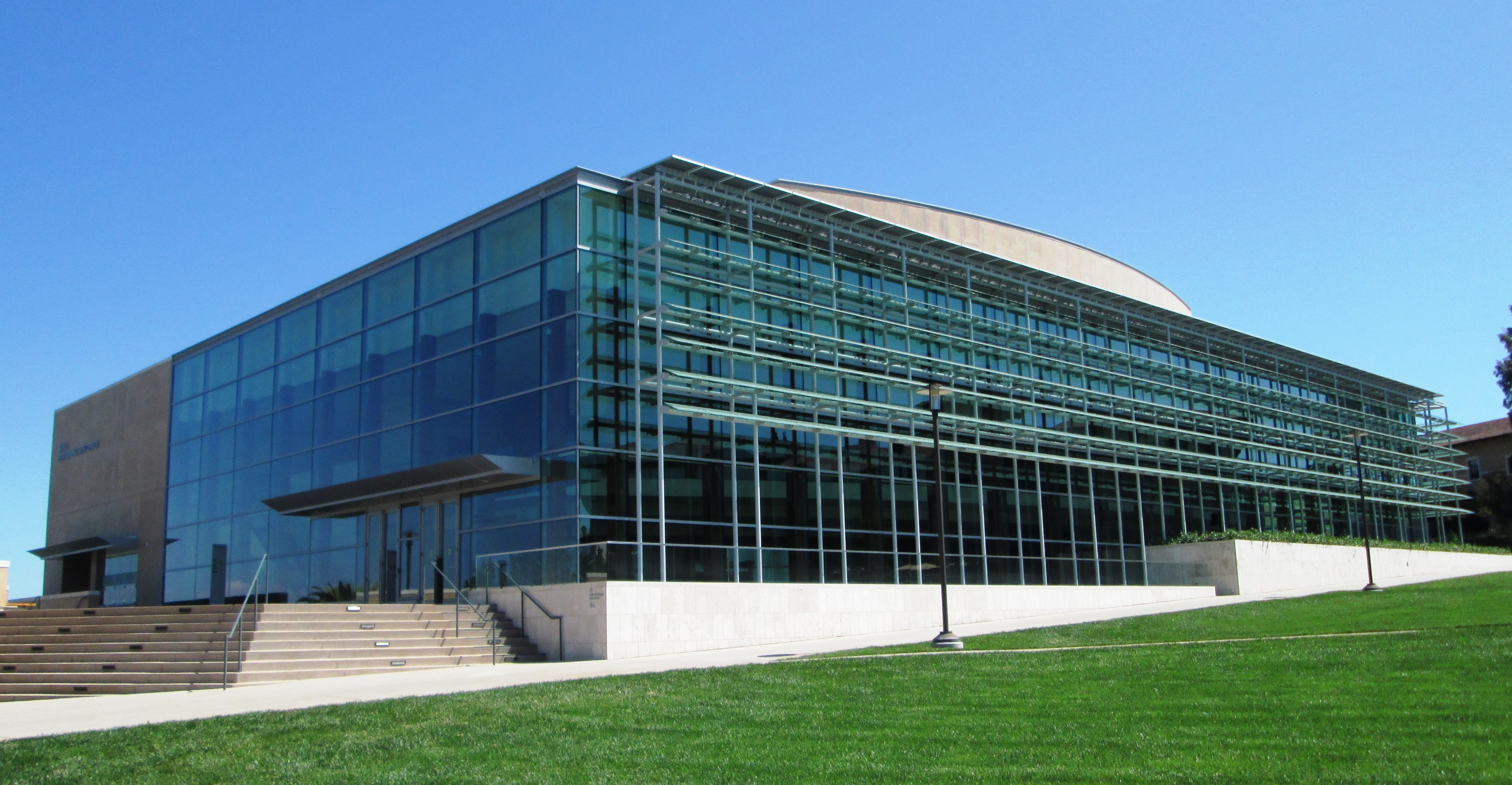
The Soka Performing Arts Center

For the Class of 2026 (enrolling fall 2022), Soka received 498 applications, accepted 282 (56.6%) and enrolled 129.

Soka University of America does not have a transfer admission program and only accept applications for entrance as a first-year student.

Since 2008, full tuition Soka Opportunity Scholarships are available for admitted students whose families make $60,000 or less. SUA was named No. 11 in U.S. News & World Report's 2022 national rankings for "Best Value – Liberal Arts Colleges". According to SUA's financial aid website in 2015, the university was need-blind for U.S. financial-aid applicants.

Between 2005 and 2007, SUA graduated its first three undergraduate classes with an average graduation rate of 90%. As of 2007, 38% of SUA graduates had gone on to graduate programs.

== Notable people ==
=== Alumni ===
- Aditi Rao: Indian activist, essayist and poet.
- Joyce Wrice: American singer and songwriter.
- Tahereh Mafi: Iranian-American author.

=== Faculty ===
- Fenwick W. English: Education professor; Guest Education professor in MA program.
- Michael Weiner: professor of East Asian history and International Studies.
- Robert Allinson: American philosopher and professor of philosophy.
- Seiji Takau: professor of Psychology and Institutional research and Assessment coordinator.

=== Other members ===
- William Ascher: Donald C. McKenna professor of Government and Economics at Claremont McKenna College; Director of Soka University of America's Pacific Basin Research Center.

=== Former members ===
- Alfred Balitzer: American professor of government; was Dean of Faculty and professor of Political philosophy at Soka University of America from 2001 to 2003.
- Donna M. Brinton: American applied linguist, author, and global educational consultant on second language education; worked as professor of TESOL at Soka University of America and as Senior lecturer in the Rossier School of Education at the University of Southern California (USC) designing and teaching online classes in the MAT-TESOL program.

== Controversies ==
=== Calabasas Controversy ===
Soka University of America (SUA), originally called Soka University of Los Angeles (SULA), initially operated from 1987 a small ESL (English as a Second Language) school at the Calabasas campus, enrolling just under 100 students. In 1990, SUA announced plans to build a future liberal arts college on campus and plans to expand the facility over the next 25 years to an enrollment of as many as 5,000 students, but ran into opposition from some local residents, the Santa Monica Mountains Conservancy, environmentalists, and government representatives.

Opponents sought to protect the Chumash ancestral site, the natural habitats and ecology, and the expansive open space viewshed within the Santa Monica Mountains National Recreation Area, and to prevent a development of unprecedented urban density adjacent to Malibu Creek State Park. According to the Los Angeles Times newspaper, the reputation of the Soka Gakkai – sometimes denounced as a cult -, its political power in Japan, and several scandals, also raised criticism against the project.

In 1992, the Mountains Recreation and Conservation Authority (MRCA), a joint-powers authority associated with the Santa Monica Mountains Conservancy, resorted to its powers of eminent domain to condemn the core parcel comprising the institution and thereby halted SUA's plans for expansion. The legal debate continued for the remainder of the decade, and the SUA enlisted well-connected lobbyists and advocates in a bid to influence Congress and the Interior Department", says the Los Angeles Times newspaper. Soka University was eventually prevented from developing any expansion plans at the Calabasas property and began looking for alternative sites to build a larger campus.

The graduate school held its first commencement in December 1995, and in the same year SUA acquired a 103-acre site in Aliso Viejo for a private non-profit four-year liberal arts college, and built a $265-million campus. The Aliso Viejo campus opened on May 3, 2001, with a freshman class of 120 students from 18 countries and 18 states. It was given $300-million endowment by the Soka Gakkai Japanese Buddhist group. In June 2005, Soka University received its accreditation from the Accrediting Commission for Senior Colleges and Universities of the Western Association of Schools and Colleges (WASC).

SUA sold the Calabasas property in April 2005 to a coalition of buyers led by the Mountains Recreation and Conservation Authority (MRCA). The former campus is now public parkland, known as King Gillette Ranch Park, and houses the visitor center for the Santa Monica Mountains National Recreation Area. In 2007, the Calabasas campus was closed and the Graduate School relocated to the Aliso Viejo campus.

=== Allegations of sectarianism ===
In 2003, two professors claimed they experienced religious discrimination, breach of contract as well as age discrimination. Soka University administrators disputed all allegations of discrimination and noted that the majority of faculty and staff are not Buddhist, said there was no evidence of preferential treatment, and said that the institution has never taught nor will it teach Buddhist—or any other—religious practices. One professor took legal action against SUA based on these allegations, but her case was dismissed on summary judgment. Another one, Linda Southwell, a terminated fine-arts professor, sued the university, alleging religious discrimination, wrongful termination and fraud. The SUA came to a settlement with the plaintiff, which included a confidentiality clause.

In 2011, Michelle Woo wrote an article for OC Weekly, a local publication in Orange County, California, in which she mentioned possible proselytizing of non-Buddhist staff and students. The article was disputed by Soka University students, faculty, and staff. It stresses that "a quarter of the 20 faculty members (...) a dozen of students (...) and four employees in key administrative and faculty roles have resigned since the campus opened in August 2001".
