= Michael Weiner (professor) =

American Orientalist (born 1949)

Michael Weiner (born 17 June 1949) is a professor of East Asian history and International Studies and is the Executive Vice President for Academic Affairs at Soka University of America (SUA). Previously, he was professor and chair of Asian studies at San Diego State University. He received his B.A. from Sophia University in Tokyo and his Ph.D. from University of Sheffield, England.

== Positions held ==
Michael Weiner taught at University of Sheffield from 1984 to 2000. He was a lecturer from 1984 to 1988, a senior lecturer from 1989 to 1994, and a reader from 1995 to 2000. He assumed the position of professor and chair of Asian studies at San Diego State University from 2000 to 2005. He became Professor of East Asian history and international studies and director of International Studies at SUA in 2005. He subsequently held a number of senior administrative positions and currently serves as Executive Vice President for Academic Affairs.

== Research ==
Weiner's research interests include eugenics and social policy in modern Japan, global migration, and minority rights in Japan, among others. Following is a list of his publications:

- The Comintern and International Communism, 1919–1943, Macmillan, 1996, pp. 158–190.
- "Destination Japan: Migration in the twentieth century," specially commissioned article for the inaugural issue of Pan-Japan; The International Journal of the Japanese Diaspora, Spring, 2000, pp. 49–74.
- "Discourses of Race and Nation in Pre-1945 Japan," Ethnic and Racial Studies, Vol. 18, No 3, July 1995, pp 433–56.
- The Internationalization of Japan, Routledge, 1993
- "Japan in the Age of Migration," in M. Douglass and G. Roberts, eds., Japan and Global Migration: Foreign workers and the advent of a multicultural society, Routledge, 2003, pp. 52–70
- Japan's Minorities; the illusion of homogeneity, Routledge, 1997
- Origins of the Korean Community in Japan, Humanities Press, 1989
- "Out of the Very Stone; Korean hibakusha," Immigrants and Minorities, Vol. 14, No 1, April 1995, pp 2–25.
- Race and Migration in Imperial Japan, Routledge, 1994
- Race, Ethnicity and Migration in Modern Japan (3 volumes), Routledge, 2005
- Japan's Minorities; the illusion of homogeneity, (2nd edition) Routledge, 2009
- Introduction to the Pacific Basin (with Shane Barter), Routledge, 2017
- Race and Ethnicity in Asia, Routledge, 2021, 2023

== Honors and awards ==
- Reischauer Fellowship, Harvard University, 1991–1992
- ESRC Fellow, 1997–2000
- Managing Editor, Japan Forum 1995–2000
- Director, Japan Studies Institute, 2000–2005
