= William Ascher =

American academic

William Ascher (born January 3, 1947) is the Donald C. McKenna Professor of Government and Economics at Claremont McKenna College in Claremont, California, where he was academic vice president and dean of the faculty (2000–2005). Previously, as professor of public policy and political science, Ascher directed Duke University's Center for International Development Research (1985–2000). He studies strategic planning, policymaking in developing countries, natural resource and environmental policy, Latin American and Asian political economy, political psychology, and forecasting methods.

He has written Forecasting: An Appraisal for Policymakers and Planners (1978), Scheming for the Poor: The Politics of Redistribution in Latin America (1984), Natural Resource Policymaking in Developing Countries (1990), Communities and Sustainable Forestry in Developing Countries (1994), Why Governments Waste Natural Resources (1999), and Bringing in the Future: Strategies for Farsightedness and Sustainability (2009). He co-authored or co-edited Strategic Planning and Forecasting (1983), Central American Recovery and Development (1989), The Caspian Sea: A Quest for Environmental Security (2000), Guide to Sustainable Development and Environmental Policy (2001), and Revitalizing Political Psychology (2005).

Ascher is the Director of Soka University of America's Pacific Basin Research Center and a member of the World Bank's Advisory Group on the Extractive Industries Transparency Initiative.

His granddaughter is American curator and writer Storm Ascher.
