= Robert Allinson =

American philosopher

Robert Elliott Allinson is an American philosopher, and a professor of philosophy at Soka University of America. He was formerly Full Professor of Philosophy at the Chinese University of Hong Kong.

== Academic career ==
Allinson has published over 200 academic papers, as well as written and edited 9 books. His work explores Chinese philosophical concepts, religion, and business practices.
