= Seiji Takaku =

American psychologist

Seiji Takaku is professor of psychology and institutional research and assessment coordinator at Soka University of America (SUA). He was previously assistant professor of psychology at Minnesota State University, Mankato, from 2000 to 2002. He received his B.A. from University of California, Los Angeles, his M.A. from California State University, Long Beach, and his Ph.D. from Claremont Graduate University.

== Research ==
Takaku's research interests include apology and forgiveness, cross-cultural studies on interpersonal & intergroup conflict resolutions, and motivation theories in psychology and Weiner's theory of attribution in particular.

His significant publications (>10 citations on google scholar) include:

- "The effects of apology and perspective taking on interpersonal forgiveness: Introducing a dissonance-attribution model of interpersonal forgiveness," Journal of Social Psychology, 2001
- "A cross-cultural examination of people’s perceptions of apology, responsibility, and justice: From the U.S.S. Greenville accident to the E-P3 airplane accident," Tohoku Psychologica Folia., in press
- "Culture and status influences on account-giving: Comparison between the U.S.A. and Japan," Journal of Applied Social Psychology, 2000
- "Reducing road rage: A test of the dissonance-attribution model of interpersonal forgiveness," Journal of Applied Social Psychology, 2006
