= Fenwick W. English =

American academic in education

- Born: Fenwick English; February 9, 1939 (age 87); Los Angeles (United States)
- Occupation: Professor of Educational Leadership

Fenwick W. English, (born February 9, 1939, Los Angeles, California, United States) is an education professor with a doctorate in Secondary Education.

In 2002, he became the Robert Wendel Eaves Senior Distinguished Professor at the University of North Carolina at Chapel Hill. He served in that role into 2018 when he moved to Teacher's College, Ball State University to be a professor and department chair.

== Early years ==
Fenwick English was born in Los Angeles, California to middle-class parents Mel and Phyllis. His father taught middle school woodshop and his mother taught music. Fenwick's father and mother were both accomplished pianists.

In 1956 English enrolled in college at USC where he graduated with a B.S. in English and Education in 1961, and an M.S. in Elementary Administration in 1963.

While studying for his M.S. he was also a teacher of third grade at the Tweedy Elementary School in South Gate, California.

== Elementary Education and Leadership ==
From his career start as a third grade teacher, English quickly moved up in the ranks of practicing educators and in school administrators. He taught elementary and middle school at Palm Crest Elementary School and Foothill Intermediate School in La Canada, California from 1961–1964. His leadership in the classroom was respected and this led to his promotion to Assistant Middle School Principal at that same Foothill Intermediate School from 1964–1965. In 1965, he moved up to Middle School Principal and Central Project Director, Temple City USD, Temple City, California.

It was during his five years at Temple City that he started to formulate his ideas into writing. His observations in the classroom and school became the groundwork for his first book Differentiated staffing: Giving teaching a chance to improve learning published in 1969.

The book was well received, and it was not long before he was putting his theories into practice. In 1970 he was asked to direct a project in staff differentiation with three pilot schools in the Mesa Public Schools District in Mesa, Arizona. The project was funded by Arizona State University where English was employed with the title of Project Director/Visiting Lecturer. In essence he was conducting practical research by being allowed to reorganize each pilot school along slightly different models and then measure performance differences. This work was the topic of his Doctoral Dissertation, and he received his Ph.D. in 1972.

There was a clear improvement of student performance due to organization and differentiation of staff. The positive results were published in two books Strategies for Differentiated Staffing (1972) and School Organization and Management (1975).

What worked in Arizona on the small scale would get its true test in the Sarasota County, Florida district schools. English was hired as the Assistant Superintendent for Personnel and Program Development by that district. At 25,000 students, the implementation was more difficult but just as effective as in Arizona.

In 2013, English would be one of the first professors of the Master of Arts in Educational Leadership at Soka University of America, Orange County, California. Being one of the pioneers of this MA Program, English described it as unique and said: "For a potential educational leader who wants to make a difference in the world Soka is the place where it happens."

== Rise to fame and career ==
From 1974 to 1977 English served as the Superintendent of Schools for Hastings-on-Hudson, New York. The school system served 1900 pupils, k-12 with 150 FTE faculty and a $6 million budget.

English received national recognition for his achievements by being elected Associate Executive Director–American Association of School Administrators (the AASA) and Director of the National Center for the Improvement of Learning. Arlington, Virginia. Although this position was honorary, it gave him exposure to people and movements within education at the national level. It also gave him the opportunity to plan and direct two national summer conferences in Minneapolis and Denver.

He documented his ideas and work in his books School Organization and Management, Needs Assessment: A focus for Curriculum Development and Quality Control in Curriculum Development.

In Washington, D.C. in the late 1970s, President Jimmy Carter's administration was moving for the creation of a cabinet-level Department of Education. Consultants were needed who knew education at the practical level. In 1979 English was hired by Peat, Marwick, Mitchell & Co. (KPMG Peat Marwick) as their National Practice Director, North American Continent, for Elementary and Secondary Education, in the firm's Washington, D.C. Office. The consulting business opened English's eyes to a whole new set of tools. Business auditing and accounting practices were well-refined and formed the core of KPMG's business. English grasped these tools quickly and was successful in being elected as a partner in the firm in 1980.

Could business auditing practices be used to further refine Educational Administration to create a better education system? English discussed the concept and the potential benefits in Improving Curriculum Management in the Schools (1980), and Fundamental Curriculum Decisions (1983).

This theory became practice when in 1979 English was asked to conduct a "Curriculum Audit" of the Columbus, Ohio Public School District. This was the first of many formal curriculum audits conducted by English or under his guidelines. The name, "Curriculum Audit" was subsequently changed to "Curriculum Management Audit" when Virginia Vertiz, Director of the National Curriculum Audit Center from 1990 to 1996, became involved in the improvement of the process.

In 1982 English was asked to become Superintendent of Schools for the prestigious Northport-East Northport Union Free School District in Northport, New York on Long Island, New York.

== Bridging from practice to academic leadership ==
To make a mark in the field of education required the credentials of a University Professorship at a minimum. Yet almost none of the professors in U.S. academia had ever practiced education or educational administration in a real secondary school district. The gap between academia and practical administration was huge (and still is). Bridging the gap became a quest for English that would take him to many positions at many academic institutions throughout the U.S. His travels in building this bridge would earn him the nickname "The Gypsy" from friends and family.

In academia, publications are the primary measure of prestige. As a secondary school district administrator, English recognized that to transition into academia, he would need to out-write and out-publish the most prolific Educational Administration professors in the country.

== Academic leadership ==
Lehigh University in Bethlehem Pennsylvania was looking to expand their standing in the field of Educational Leadership. English was hired as a professor of Educational Administration in the Department of Leadership, Instruction and Technology, College of Education, in 1984.

His academic responsibilities and status grew as he made strategic career shifts throughout the late 1980s and 1990s:

- Professor and Department Head, Educational Administration, College of Education, University of Cincinnati, Ohio. Doctoral and masters level instruction. UCEA member program. 1987–1991
- Professor, Department of Educational Administration and Supervision, College of Education, University of Kentucky, Lexington, Kentucky. Doctoral and masters level instruction. UCEA member program. 1991–1995
- Professor and Dean, School of Education- Indiana University Purdue University Fort Wayne (IPFW). Responsible for 20 FTE faculty, 800 undergraduate students, 400 graduate students (masters). 1995–1996. English also held the position of Director of the National Center for the Improvement of Learning during this time.
- Vice-Chancellor for Academic Affairs - Indiana University -Purdue University Fort Wayne (IPFW). Responsible for 7 academic units (Arts and Sciences, Engineering and Technology, Fine Arts, Education, Nursing, Business, Continuing Education) 159 degree programs, 11,500 students, 500 faculty. (1996–1998)
- Professor and Program Coordinator-Educational Leadership Program. R. Wendell Eaves Distinguished Professor of Educational Leadership. 5 FTE faculty, 6 adjuncts (clinical). Doctoral and masters level instruction, UCEA member program, University of North Carolina at Chapel Hill. Also served as Interim Dean of the School of Education, July–October 2003.

== Current projects ==
English has wrote Leading Beautifully: Educational Leadership as Connoisseurship, Routledge in 2016 with Lisa Ehrich.

English's rise to the "top" of educational leadership has not been accompanied by a softening of his views on the status quo of education. He remains a radical. A 2000 article on the ISLLC standards is illustrative.

English has experience in educational administration, academia, and publishing. He critiques established academic bodies and advocates for a change in their scientific approaches. He states that educational leadership should balance performance and accountability. According to English, applying educational leadership as an art affects the training of school administrators and teachers.

In 2005 English was elected to the Presidency of University Council of Educational Administration.

Fenwick W. English is also the creator and founder of the Curriculum Management Auditing process, first implemented in 1979 in the Columbus Public Schools, Ohio. The Curriculum Audit process is now owned by Curriculum Management Systems, Inc., and Fenwick English serves as the President. The company, founded in 1996, was formed under Fenwick's leadership, and the original colleagues and owners of the business were English, Betty E. Steffy-English, William K. Poston Jr., Carolyn J. Downey, Larry E. Frase (died 2005) and R. Gerald Melton (died 2002). The company continues to offer curriculum audits in small and large school systems and colleges all over the world. Over 300 curriculum audits have been conducted to date by CMSi through its affiliates, Phi Delta Kappa International and the Texas Association of School Administrators. CMSi also offers over a dozen special training programs, engineered and created by Fen and/or his colleagues, designed to help educators work to close the achievement gaps between student groups. The company is headquartered in Johnston, Iowa, and has six employees, and approximately 200 licensed auditors and service-providers who work as independent subcontractors.

== Bibliography ==
- English, Fenwick W. (September 2007). The Art of Educational Leadership: Balancing Performance and Accountability. SAGE Publishing Company of Thousand Oaks, California.
- English, Fenwick W. (September 2007). Anatomy of Professional Practice: Promising Research Perspectives on Educational Leadership. Rowman and Littlefield of Lanham, Maryland.
- English, Fenwick W.; G. Furman (September 2007). Research and Educational Leadership: Navigating the New National Research Council Guidelines. Rowman & Littlefield Education, Lanham, MD.
- Downey, Carolyn; B.E. Steffy; F. English; L. Frase; W. Poston (September 2005). The Three-Minute Classroom Walk-Through: Changing School Supervisory Practice One Teacher At a Time. Corwin Press, Thousand Oaks, CA.
- English, Fenwick W.; Larson, R. (September 2003). The Postmodern Challenge to the Theory and Practice of Educational Administration. Charles C. Thomas Publishers, Springfield, Illinois.
- English, Fenwick W.; B. Steffy (September 2001). Deep Curriculum Alignment: Creating a Level Playing Field for All Children on High Stakes Tests of Accountability. Scarecrow Press, Lanham, MD.
- English, Fenwick W. (September 2000). Deciding What to Teach and Test Millennium Edition. Corwin Press.
- English, Fenwick W.; Poston, W. (September 1999). GAAP: Generally Accepted Audit Principles for Curriculum Management. CMAC, Huxley, Iowa.
- Hoyle, J..; English, F.; Steffy, B. (September 1998). Skills for Successful School Leaders. American Association of School Administration., Arlington, Virginia.
- English, Fenwick W. (September 1997). Curriculum and Assessment for World-Class Schools. Technomic, Lancaster, PA.
- English, Fenwick W. (September 1996). Curriculum Management for Educational and Social Service Organizations. Springfield, Illinois: Charles C. Thomas Publisher.
- English, Fenwick W. (September 1994). Theory in Educational Administration. New York: Harper Collins.
- English, Fenwick W.; Hill, J. (September 1994). Total Quality Education: Transforming Schools Into Learning Places. Thousand Oaks, CA: Corwin Press, Inc.
- English, Fenwick W.; Frase, L.; Poston, W. (September 1994). The Curriculum Management Audit: Improving School Quality. Lancaster, PA: Technomic.
- English, Fenwick W. (September 1992). Deciding What to Teach and Test. Thousand Oaks, CA: Corwin Press.
- English, Fenwick W. (September 1992). Educational Administration: The Human Science. New York: Harper Collins.
- English, Fenwick W.; Frase, L.; Arhar, J. (September 1990). Leading Into the 21st Century. Thousand Oaks, CA:Corwin Press.
- English, Fenwick W. (September 1988). Curriculum Auditing. Lancaster, PA: Technomic.
- English, Fenwick W. (September 1987). Curriculum Management for Schools, Colleges, Business. Springfield, Illinois: Charles C. Thomas Publishers.
- English, Fenwick W.; Black, J. (September 1986). What They Don't Tell You in Schools of Education About School Administration. Lancaster, PA: Technomic.
- English, Fenwick W.; Hoyle, J.; Steffy, B. (September 1985). Skills for Successful School Leaders. American Association of School Administrators.Arlington, Virginia.
- English, Fenwick W.; Steffy, B. (September 1984). Educational Consulting. Englewood Cliffs, NJ: Educational Technology Publications.
- English, Fenwick W.; Kaufman, R. (September 1979). Needs Assessment: Concept and Application. Englewood Cliffs, NJ: Educational Technology Publications.
- English, Fenwick W.; Steeves, F. (September 1978). Secondary Curriculum for a Changing World. Columbus, Ohio: Charles A. Merrill.
- English, Fenwick W. (September 1975). School Organization and Management. Worthington, Ohio: Charles A. Jones Publishing Company.
- English, Fenwick W.; Sharpes, D. (September 1972). Strategies for Differentiated Staffing. Berkeley, CA:McCutchan Publishing Corporation.
