= Alfred Balitzer =

American academic

Alfred Balitzer is an American professor of government at Claremont Graduate University.

He graduated from California State University, Los Angeles, and from the University of Chicago with a master of arts degree. He completed his Ph.D. in government at CGU in 1971. He has been involved in numerous political campaigns throughout California and the nation, such as director of the Republican National Committee under President Ronald Reagan, and chairman of Scholars for Reagan-Bush in 1984. President Reagan appointed Dr. Balitzer Special Ambassador to Brunei (special emissary to the Sultan of Brunei).

Balitzer was Dean of Faculty and Professor of Political Philosophy at Soka University of America from 2001 to 2003. He was asked to resign his dean position by Soka University of America President Daniel Habuki after a student sit-in, which was reportedly spurred by an inflammatory email he wrote about Professor Joe McGinniss.

Balitzer has published a number of monographs on American political institutions and practices over the years, including on such subjects as political action committees, the initiative and referendum and redistricting. He played a leading role in preventing efforts to make the District of Columbia a state. He also published frequently on issues concerning American government, among them American religion, grassroots politics, the role and impact of minority populations and demographic changes on American politics, and American foreign and military policy.

== Published works ==
- A Nation of Associations (American Society of Association Executives, 1981)
- Editor, Time for Choosing : The Speeches of Ronald Reagan (National Book Network, 1983)
