= NAIA independent schools =

Informal athletic conference member schools

Continental Athletic Conference
- Formerly: Association of Independent Institutions (2008–2021)
- Association: National Association of Intercollegiate Athletics (NAIA)
- Founded: 2008; 18 years ago (as the AII)
- Commissioner: Ted Breidenthal
- Sports fielded: 13; men's: 6; women's: 7
- No. of teams: 14 (10 in 2027)
- Region: United States and Canada (British Columbia)
- Website: continentalathletics.com

Locations
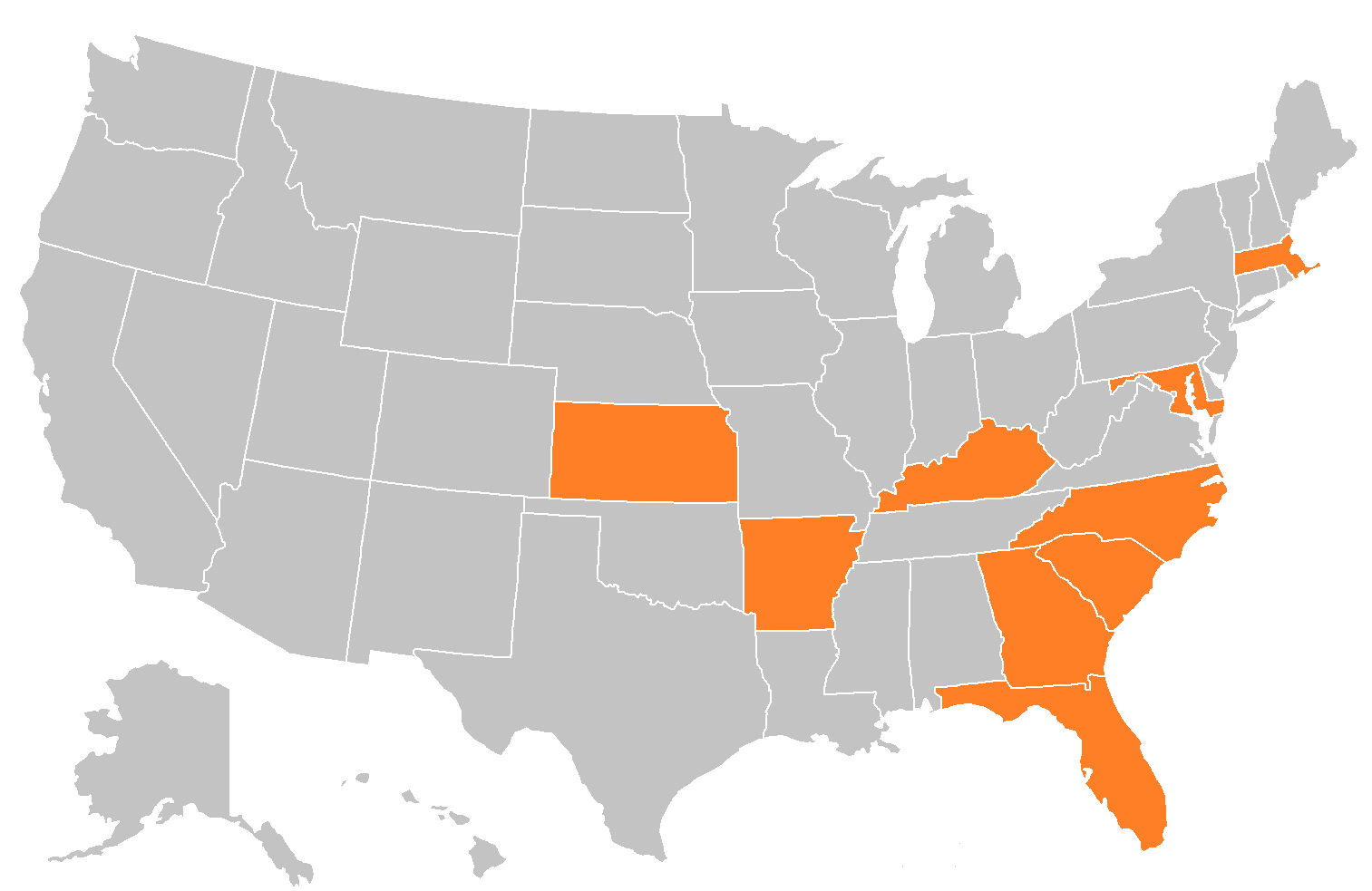

NAIA independent schools are four-year institutional members of the National Association of Intercollegiate Athletics (NAIA) that do not have formal conference affiliations. NAIA schools that are not members of any other athletic conference are members of the Continental Athletic Conference (CAC), formerly the Association of Independent Institutions (AII), which provides member services to the institution and allows members to compete in postseason competition. The CAC has one member institution in Canada's British Columbia. It provides services to the member institutions that are not fitting in any other NAIA conference and allows members to compete in postseason competition. The AII renamed itself the Continental Athletic Conference at the end of June 2021, citing the need to identify as a proper conference.

== History ==
=== Chronological timeline ===
- 2008 – The Association of Independent Institutions (AII) was founded by a select group of independent universities and colleges that do not have formal conference affiliations and provide member services to the institutions and allows them to compete in postseason competition. Charter members included the University of Alberta, Allen University, Ave Maria University, Brescia University, the University of British Columbia, Crichton College (later Victory University), California State University San Marcos (Cal State–San Marcos), Embry–Riddle Aeronautical University at Arizona (Embry–Riddle at Arizona), Fisk University, Holy Cross College (Indiana), the University of Houston–Victoria (Houston–Victoria, UHV; now Texas A&M University–Victoria), Indiana University–Northwest (Indiana–Northwest), Johnson & Wales University–Denver, Johnson & Wales University–North Miami, Kentucky Christian University, Lambuth University, Life University, Louisiana State University at Alexandria (Louisiana State–Alexandria or LSU Alexandria), Marygrove College, Morris College, Mountain State University, Our Lady of the Lake University, Park University, Patten University, Philander Smith College (now Philander Smith University), the University of Regina, the College of Santa Fe, Simon Fraser University, Soka University of America, Southeastern University of Florida, Southern Virginia University, Southwestern College of Arizona (now Arizona Christian University), the University of St. Thomas of Texas, the State University of New York at Delhi (SUNY Delhi), Talladega College, Thomas University, the University of Victoria, Voorhees College (now Voorhees University), and Walla Walla University beginning in the 2008–09 academic year. Out of those AII member institutions during that time, only three of them competed as partial or affiliate members, while they compete in other athletic conferences for their other sports as their primary home: Brescia and Mountain State for the Kentucky Intercollegiate Athletic Conference (KIAC, now the River States Conference), and Park for the Midlands Collegiate Athletic Conference (MCAC).
- 2009 – Nine institutions left the AII, seven to join their respective new home primary conferences, all effective after the 2008–09 academic year:
  - Ave Maria, Johnson & Wales–Miami and Southeastern (Fla.) to join the Sun Conference (formerly the Florida Sun Conference)
  - Brescia's basketball teams to join the rest of its athletics program in the KIAC
  - Holy Cross (Ind.) to join the Chicagoland Collegiate Athletic Conference (CCAC)
  - Our Lady of the Lake to join the Red River Athletic Conference (RRAC)
  - and Park to join the American Midwest Conference
  - the eight and ninth, Santa Fe and Victory, ceased operations
  - the tenth, Mountain State, has its men's basketball team to join the rest of its athletics program in the KIAC, while its women's basketball team remained in the AII
- 2009 – Northern New Mexico College, Ohio Dominican University, and Truett McConnell College (now Truett McConnell University) joined the AII in the 2009–10 academic year.
- 2010 – Four institutions left the AII to join their respective new home primary conferences, all effective after the 2009–10 academic year:
  - Alberta to realign its athletics program to the Canada West Universities Athletic Association (Canada West) of the Canadian Interuniversity Sport (CIS; now the U Sports)
  - Fisk to join the Gulf Coast Athletic Conference (GCAC, now the HBCU Athletic Conference)
  - Ohio Dominican to join the NCAA Division II ranks and the Great Lakes Intercollegiate Athletic Conference (GLIAC)
  - and Truett McConnell to join the Southern States Athletic Conference (SSAC)
- 2010 – Benedictine University at Springfield, Central Baptist College, Lourdes College (now Lourdes University), and Warren Wilson College joined the AII in the 2010–11 academic year.
- 2011 – Nine institutions left the AII, eight to join their respective new home primary conferences, all effective after the 2010–11 academic year:
  - Philander Smith and Talladega to join the GCAC
  - Regina to realign its athletics program to the CIS
  - Simon Fraser to realign its athletics program to the NCAA Division II ranks and the Great Northwest Athletic Conference (GNAC)
  - St. Thomas (Tex.) to join the RRAC
  - Benedictine–Springfield to join the American Midwest
  - Central Baptist to join the MCAC, and Lourdes to join the Wolverine–Hoosier Athletic Conference (WHAC)
  - the ninth, Lambuth, ceased operations
- 2011 – Dakota State University, Dickinson State University, the University of Jamestown, La Sierra University, Lawrence Technological University (Lawrence Tech), Marymount College (later Marymount California University), Mayville State University, Rochester College (now Rochester Christian University), the Atlanta campus of the Savannah College of Art and Design (SCAD Atlanta), and Valley City State University joined the AII in the 2011–12 academic year.
- 2012 – 13 institutions left the AII, 11 to join their respective new home primary conferences, all effective after the 2011–12 academic year:
  - Arizona Christian to join the Golden State Athletic Conference (GSAC)
  - Dickinson State to join the Frontier Conference
  - Embry–Riddle at Arizona, Marymount (Cal.) and Soka to join the California Pacific Conference (Cal Pac)
  - Life to join the TranSouth Athletic Conference (TSAC or TranSouth)
  - Marygrove and Lawrence Tech to join the WHAC
  - SCAD Atlanta to join the Appalachian Athletic Conference (AAC)
  - Southern Virginia and Warren Wilson to realign within the United States Collegiate Athletic Association (USCAA) [with Southern Virginia later applying to join the NCAA Division III ranks, beginning the 2013–14 school year]
  - Thomas (Ga.) to join the Sun Conference
  - the twelfth and thirteenth, Mountain State and Patten, ceased operations
- 2012 – Ashford University, Fisher College, Iowa Wesleyan University, the West Virginia Institute of Technology (WVU Tech), Wilberforce University, Georgia Gwinnett College, Indiana University–Kokomo (Indiana–Kokomo or IU Kokomo), and Lindenwood University–Belleville joined the AII in the 2012–13 academic year.
- 2013 – Eight institutions left the AII to join their respective new home primary conferences, all effective after the 2012–13 academic year:
  - La Sierra to join the Cal Pac, Voorhees to join the GCAC
  - Dakota State, Jamestown, Mayville State and Valley City State to join the then-newly created North Star Athletic Association (NSAA)
  - Indiana–Kokomo (IU Kokomo) to join the KIAC
  - and Iowa Wesleyan to join the NCAA Division III ranks and the St. Louis Intercollegiate Athletic Conference (SLIAC)
- 2013 – Dalton State College and the University of Antelope Valley joined the AII (with Life rejoining after one season in the recently defunct TranSouth) in the 2013–14 academic year.
- 2014 – Four institutions left the AII to join their respective new home primary conferences, all effective after the 2013–14 academic year:
  - Dalton State to join the SSAC
  - Life to join the Mid-South Conference
  - Lindenwood–Belleville to join the American Midwest
  - and Louisiana State–Alexandria (LSU Alexandria) to join the RRAC
- 2014 – Texas A&M University–Texarkana, Lincoln Christian University, Washington Adventist University, the University of Winnipeg, and Trinity Lutheran College joined the AII in the 2014–15 academic year.
- 2015 – Four institutions left the AII to join their respective new home primary conferences, all effective after the 2014–15 academic year:
  - Antelope Valley to join the Cal Pac
  - Cal State–San Marcos to join the NCAA Division II ranks and the California Collegiate Athletic Association (CCAA)
  - Houston–Victoria (UHV) to join the RRAC
  - and Walla Walla to join the Cascade Collegiate Conference (CCC)
- 2015 – Central Christian College of Kansas, Clarke University, the College of the Ozarks (CofO), Governors State University, Haskell Indian Nations University, Mount Mercy University, York College of Nebraska (now York University of Nebraska), and Providence Christian College (with Voorhees rejoining) joined the AII in the 2015–16 academic year. Out of those AII member institutions during that time, only one competed in other athletic conferences for other sports as their primary home: Providence Christian for the Cal Pac.
- 2016 – Nine institutions left the AII, seven to join their respective new home primary conferences, all effective after the 2015–16 academic year:
  - Allen to join the AAC
  - Clarke and Mount Mercy to join the Heart of America Athletic Conference (HAAC)
  - Governors State to join the CCAC
  - Texas A&M–Texarkana to join the RRAC
  - Winnipeg to realign its athletics program to the CIS (with its baseball program to join the NSAA as an affiliate member)
  - and York (Neb.) to join the Kansas Collegiate Athletic Conference (KCAC)
  - the eighth and ninth, Ashford and Trinity Lutheran, ceased operations.
- 2016 – Crowley's Ridge College, Silver Lake College of the Holy Family (later Holy Family College), Stillman College, and the University of the Virgin Islands (UVI) joined the AII in the 2016–17 academic year.
- 2017 – Two institutions left the AII to join their respective new home primary conferences, both effective after the 2016–17 academic year:
  - Central Christian to join the Sooner Athletic Conference (SAC)
  - and Rochester Christian to join the WHAC
- 2017 – Cleary University, Florida College, the University of Maine at Fort Kent (UMFK), Rust College, and the College of St. Joseph joined the AII in the 2017–18 academic year.
- 2018 – Eight institutions left the AII to join their respective new home primary conferences, all effective after the 2017–18 academic year:
  - British Columbia to realign its athletics program to the U Sports (with its baseball program to join the CCC as an affiliate member)
  - Cleary to join the WHAC
  - Johnson & Wales–Denver to join the NCAA Division III ranks and the Southern Collegiate Athletic Conference (SCAC)
  - Maine–Fort Kent (UMFK) to realign its athletics program with the USCAA
  - SUNY Delhi to fully realign to the NCAA Division III ranks and join the North Atlantic Conference (NAC)
  - and Stillman and Florida College to join the SSAC, Rust to join the GCAC
- 2018 – Florida Memorial University, Green Mountain College, Cottey College, Lincoln College, Pennsylvania State University Schuylkill, and Villa Maria College joined the AII in the 2018–19 academic year.
- 2019 – Five institutions left the AII, three to join their respective new home primary conferences, all effective after the 2018–19 academic year:
  - Indiana–Northwest (IU Northwest) to join the CCAC
  - Kentucky Christian to join the AAC
  - and Villa Maria to realign its athletics program with the USCAA
  - the fourth and fifth, Green Mountain and St. Joseph (Vt.), ceased operations.
- 2019 – Bacone College joined the AII in the 2019–20 academic year.
- 2020 – Two institutions left the AII, one to join its respective new home primary conference, both effective after the 2019–20 academic year:
  - Lincoln (Ill.) to join the CCAC
  - the other, Holy Family, ceased operations.
- 2021 – Two institutions left the AII to join their respective new home primary conferences, both effective after the 2020–21 academic year:
  - Fisk to rejoin the GCAC
  - and the CofO to fully align with the National Christian College Athletic Association (NCCAA); when the school left the association mid-season
- 2021 – The AII was rebranded as the Continental Athletic Conference (CAC) in the 2021–22 academic year.
- 2021 – Arkansas Baptist College (with Iowa Wesleyan rejoining) joined the CAC in the 2021–22 academic year.
- 2022 – Three institutions left the CAC, two to join their respective new home primary conferences, all effective after the 2021–22 academic year:
  - Cottey to join the American Midwest
  - and Wilberforce to join the Mid-South
  - the third, Lincoln Christian, announced that it had discontinued its athletics program.
- 2022 – The University of South Carolina Beaufort (USC Beaufort), Indiana University–Purdue University Columbus (IUPUC [now Indiana University–Columbus or Indiana–Columbus]), and North American University joined the CAC in the 2022–23 academic year.
- 2023 – Five institutions left the CAC, four to join their respective new home primary conferences, all effective after the 2022–23 academic year:
  - Indiana–Columbus (IU Columbus, then known as IUPUC) to join the River States
  - North American to join the RRAC
  - USC Beaufort to fully realign in the NCAA Division II ranks and the Peach Belt Conference (PBC)
  - and Virgin Islands to join the GCAC
  - the fifth, Iowa Wesleyan, ceased operations; originally they had planned to leave the CAC after the school got an invite to rejoin the American Midwest prior to announcing their closure.
- 2023 – The College of the Ozarks (CofO) returned to the NAIA and rejoined the CAC (after two seasons competing as a full member of the NCCAA), alongside Wilberforce rejoining after competing one season in the Mid-South, both effective in the 2023–24 academic year.
- 2024 – Six institutions left the CAC, five to join their respective new home primary conferences, all effective after the 2023–24 academic year:
  - CofO to join the SAC
  - Crowley's Ridge to join the American Midwest
  - Voorhees & Wilberforce to join the GCAC (with the former one rejoining)
  - and Penn State–Schuylkill to fully align with the USCAA and the Pennsylvania State University Athletic Conference (PSUAC)
  - the sixth, Bacone, cease all operations
- 2024 – Spartanburg Methodist College and Carolina University joined the CAC in the 2024–25 academic year.
- 2025 – Two institutions left the CAC to join their respective new home primary conferences, both effective after the 2024–25 academic year:
  - Northern New Mexico to join the Cal Pac
  - and Spartanburg Methodist to join the AAC
- 2025 – Alice Lloyd College and Hesston College joined the CAC in the 2025–26 academic year.
- 2026:
  - Alice Lloyd left the CAC and the NAIA to realign its athletics program with the USCAA after the 2025–26 academic year.
  - Champion Christian College, Georgia Southern University–East Georgia Campus, and United States Sports University (USSU) joined the CAC in the 2026–27 academic year.
- 2027 – Four institutions will leave the CAC to join their respective new home primary conferences, all effective after the 2026–27 academic year:
  - Carolina to join the AAC
  - Champion Christian to join the American Midwest
  - Georgia Southern–East Georgia and USSU to join the SSAC

== Member schools ==
Note: – Schools that compete as independents in some certain sports that their own primary conferences home don't sponsor compete in the CAC as affiliate members (except football).

=== Current full members ===
Departing members are highlighted in pink.

Institution	Location	Founded	Affiliation	Enrollment	Nickname	Joined (Note: Represents the calendar year when fall sports competition begins.)	Basketball?	Future conference
Arkansas Baptist College (Note: Also sponsors football.)	Little Rock, Arkansas	1884	Baptist (Note: Also a historically black college and university.)	373	Buffaloes	2021	both	–
Carolina University (Note: This institution held dual membership with the National Christian College Athletic Association (NCCAA).)	Winston-Salem, North Carolina	1945	Nondenominational	893	Bruins	2024	both	Appalachian (AAC)
Champion Christian College	Hot Springs, Arkansas	2005	Nondenominational	146	Tigers	2026	both	American Midwest (AMC)
Fisher College	Boston, Massachusetts	1903	Nonsectarian	1,501	Falcons	2012	both	–
Florida College	Temple Terrace, Florida	1946	Churches of Christ	657	Falcons	2021	men's (Note: Florida College had sponsored women's basketball until after the 2020–21 school year.)	–
Florida National University (Note: This institution held dual membership with the United States Collegiate Athletic Association (USCAA).)	Hialeah, Florida	1988	For-profit	2,638	Conquistadors	2018	both	–
Georgia Gwinnett College	Lawrenceville, Georgia	2006	Public	11,907	Grizzlies	2012	both	–
Georgia Southern University–East Georgia Campus	Swainsboro, Georgia	1973 (Note: GSU–East Georgia was originally founded as East Georgia State College, which began offering degrees in 1973. East Georgia State was consolidated into Georgia Southern as its East Georgia campus in 2026.)	Public	1,826	Golden Eagles	2026	both	Southern States (SSAC)
Haskell Indian Nations University	Lawrence, Kansas	1884	Public tribal	878	Fighting Indians	2015	both	–
Hesston College	Hesston, Kansas	1909	Mennonite	308	Larks	2025 (Note: This institution was also a former member of the National Christian College Athletic Association (NCCAA; Hesston until 2026).)	both	–
Morris College	Sumter, South Carolina	1908	Baptist	421	Hornets	2005 (Note: School competed as a full Independent within the NAIA prior the inception of the AII/Continental beginning the 2008–09 school year.)	both	–
United States Sports University	Daphne, Alabama	1972	Nonsectarian	367	Eagles	2026	none	Southern States (SSAC)
University of Victoria	Victoria, British Columbia, Canada	1903	Public	15,999	Vikes	2006	none (Note: UVic is the only full member within the AII/Continental who competes in partial status, with men's and women's golf as the only sponsored sports; while some of their other sports compete in their primary home conference at the Canada West Universities Athletic Association (Canada West) of U Sports, where it doesn't sponsor golf.)	–
Washington Adventist University	Takoma Park, Maryland	1904	Seventh-day; Adventist	695	Shock	2014	both	–

=== Current partial members ===
Institution	Location	Founded	Affiliation	Enrollment	Nickname	Joined (Note: Represents the calendar year when fall sports competition begins.)	AII/CAC sport(s)	Primary conference
Bellevue University	Bellevue, Nebraska	1966	Nonsectarian	14,476	Bruins	2021	Men's soccer	Frontier
Bellevue University	Bellevue, Nebraska	1966	Nonsectarian	14,476	Bruins	2021	Women's soccer	Frontier
Fisk University (Note: Fisk was a partial member for men's soccer from the 2021 to 2023 fall seasons (2021–22 to 2023–24 school years).)	Nashville, Tennessee	1866	U.C.C. (Note: Also a historically black college and university.)	1,005	Bulldogs	2021	Men's golf	HBCU (HBCUAC)
Fisk University	Nashville, Tennessee	1866	U.C.C.	1,005	Bulldogs	2021	Women's golf	HBCU (HBCUAC)
Our Lady of the Lake University (Note: Our Lady of the Lake (OLLU) was a partial member for men's golf for the 2022 spring season (2021–22 school year).)	San Antonio, Texas	1895	Catholic (C.D.P.)	2,096	Saints	2021	Women's golf	Red River (RRAC)
Talladega College (Note: Talladega was a partial member for softball for the 2024 spring season (2023–24 school year) and a partial member for men's and women's soccer for the 2023 and 2024 fall seasons (2023–24 and 2024–25 school years).)	Talladega, Alabama	1867	U.C.C.	837	Tornadoes	2023	Men's golf	HBCU (HBCUAC)
Westcliff University	Irvine, California	1993	For-profit	6,532	Warriors	2024	Softball	California Pacific (CalPac)

=== Former full members ===
School names and nicknames listed here reflect those used in the final school year each institution was a member as an NAIA independent.

Institution	Location	Founded	Affiliation	Nickname	Joined (Note: Represents the calendar year when fall sports competition begins.)	Left (Note: Represents the calendar year when spring sports competition ends.)	Current conference	BKB? (Note: Abbreviation for basketball.)
University of Alberta	Edmonton, Alberta	1908	Public	Golden Bears (Note: Alberta's men's sports compete as the Golden Bears; while its women's sports they compete as the Pandas.) & Pandas	1995 (Note: School competed as a full Independent within the NAIA prior the inception of the AII/Continental, which began in the 2008–09 school year.)	2010	Canada West (CWUAA) (Note: Current conference within U Sports, Canada's governing body for university sports.)	none (Note: Alberta was one of many full members within the AII/Continental which competed in a partial status, with men's and women's tennis as the only sponsored sports; while some of their other sports compete in their primary home conference at the Canada West Universities Athletic Association (Canada West) of U Sports, where it doesn't sponsor tennis.)
Alice Lloyd College (Note: This institution held dual membership with the National Christian College Athletic Association (NCCAA).)	Pippa Passes, Kentucky	1923	Nondenominational	Eagles	2025	2026	USCAA Independent	both
Allen University	Columbia, South Carolina	1870	A.M.E. Church (Note: Also a historically black college and university.)	Yellow Jackets	2005	2016	Southern (SIAC) (Note: Current NCAA Division II athletic conference.)	both
University of Antelope Valley	Lancaster, California	2009	For-profit	Pioneers	2013	2015	Closed in 2024	both
Arizona Christian University (Note: Formerly known as Southwestern College until 2011.)	Glendale, Arizona (Note: Former campus location was in Phoenix.)	1960	Nondenominational	Firestorm	2009	2012	Great Southwest (GSAC)	both
Ashford University	Clinton, Iowa	1918	For-profit	Saints	2012	2016	Closed in 2016	both
Ave Maria University	Ave Maria, Florida	2003	Catholic (Diocese of Venice)	Gyrenes	2008	2009	The Sun (TSC)	both
Bacone College	Muskogee, Oklahoma	1880	Tribal college (Note: Formerly affiliated with the American Baptist Churches USA (ABCUSA) until 2018.)	Warriors	2019	2024	Closed in 2024	both
Belhaven College (Note: Currently known as Belhaven University since 2010.)	Jackson, Mississippi	1883	Evangelical; Presbyterian	Blazers	2000	2002	C.C. South (CCS) (Note: Current NCAA Division III athletic conference.)	both
Benedictine University at Springfield	Springfield, Illinois	1927	Catholic (Ursulines)	Bulldogs	2010	2011	Closed in 2018	both
Bryant University	Smithfield, Rhode Island	1863	Nonsectarian	Bulldogs	1963	1976	America East (AmEast) (Note: Current NCAA Division I athletic conference.)	both
University of British Columbia	Vancouver, British Columbia	1908	Public	Thunderbirds	2000?	2018	Canada West (CWUAA)	none (Note: British Columbia was one of many full members within the AII/Continental which competed in a partial status, with baseball, men's and women's cross country, men's and women's golf, and men's and women's outdoor track and field as the only sponsored sports; while some of their other sports compete in their primary home conference at the Canada West Universities Athletic Association (Canada West) of U Sports, where it doesn't sponsor neither of those previously mentioned sports.)
California State University San Marcos	San Marcos, California	1989	Public (Note: Part of the California State University System.)	Cougars	1998	2015	California (CCAA)	both (Note: The Cal State–San Marcos men's and women's basketball teams joined as an Independent 13 years after becoming a full member for other sports (2011–12).)
Central Baptist College	Conway, Arkansas	1952	Baptist Missionary	Mustangs	2009	2011	American Midwest	both
Central Christian College of Kansas	McPherson, Kansas	1884	Free Methodist	Tigers	2015	2017	Sooner (SAC)	both
University of Central Oklahoma (Note: Formerly known as Central State University until 1990.)	Edmond, Oklahoma	1890	Public (Note: Part of the Regional University System of Oklahoma.)	Bronchos	1977	1987	Mid-America (MIAA)	both
Clarke University (Note: Formerly known as Clarke College until 2010.)	Dubuque, Iowa	1843	Catholic (B.V.M.)	Crusaders (Note: Clarke now competes as the Pride since the 2017–18 school year.)	2006; 2015 (Note: Clarke left the Independent/AII/Continental ranks after the 2006–07 school year; before rejoining for only the 2015–16 school year.)	2007; 2016	Heart of America (HAAC)	both
Cleary University	Howell, Michigan	1883	Nonsectarian	Cougars	2017	2018	Wolverine–Hoosier (WHAC)	both
College of Coastal Georgia	Brunswick, Georgia	1961	Public	Mariners	2011	2012	The Sun (TSC)	both
Colorado State University–Pueblo (CSU Pueblo)	Pueblo, Colorado	1933	Public	ThunderWolves	1963	1967	Rocky Mountain (RMAC)	both
Cottey College (Note: This institution is a women's college, therefore it does not field men's sports.)	Nevada, Missouri	1884	Nonsectarian	Comets	2018	2022	American Midwest	women's
Crowley's Ridge College	Paragould, Arkansas	1964	Churches of Christ	Pioneers	2016	2024	American Midwest	both
Crichton College (Note: Later became known as Victory University in 2010.)	Memphis, Tennessee	1941	Nondenominational	Eagles	2008	2009	Closed in 2014 (Note: Crichton (as Victory) reinstated its athletics program in fall 2010; until the university ceased operations after spring 2014.)	men's
Dakota State University	Madison, South Dakota	1881	Public (Note: Part of the South Dakota Board of Regents System.)	Trojans	2011	2013	Frontier	both
Dalton State College	Dalton, Georgia	1963	Public (Note: Part of the University System of Georgia.)	Roadrunners	2012	2014	Southern States (SSAC)	men's
University of Denver	Denver, Colorado	1864	Nonsectarian	Pioneers	1979	1990	West Coast (WCC)	both
Dickinson State University	Dickinson, North Dakota	1918	Public (Note: Part of the North Dakota University System.)	Blue Hawks	2011	2012	Frontier	both
Embry–Riddle Aeronautical University–Prescott	Prescott, Arizona	1978	Nonsectarian	Eagles	2008?	2012	Great Southwest (GSAC)	both
Fisk University	Nashville, Tennessee	1866	United; Church of Christ	Bulldogs	2008; 2014 (Note: Fisk withdrew from the Independent/AII/Continental ranks from 2010–11 to 2013–14.)	2010; 2021	HBCU (HBCUAC)	both
Governors State University	University Park, Illinois	1969	Public	Jaguars	2015	2016	Chicagoland (CCAC)	both
Grand Canyon University	Phoenix, Arizona	1949	For-profit	Antelopes	1961	1990	Mountain West (MW)	both
Green Mountain College	Poultney, Vermont	1834	United; Methodist	Eagles	2018	2019	Closed in 2019	both
Holy Cross College	Notre Dame, Indiana	1966	Catholic (C.S.C.)	Saints	2006	2009	Chicagoland (CCAC)	both
Holy Family College (Note: Formerly known as Silver Lake College until 2019.)	Manitowoc, Wisconsin	1935	Catholic (Franciscan)	Lakers	2016	2020	Closed in 2020	both
University of Houston–Victoria (Note: Known since 2025 as Texas A&M University–Victoria.) (Note: Part of the University of Houston System during its AII tenure; now part of the Texas A&M University System.) (UHV)	Victoria, Texas	1973	Public	Jaguars	2007	2015	Red River (RRAC)	none
University of the Incarnate Word	San Antonio, Texas	1881	Catholic (CCVI)	Cardinals	1980	1987	Southland (SLC)	both
Indiana University–Purdue University Indianapolis (Note: Known since 2024 as Indiana University Indianapolis (IU Indy).) (Note: IU Indy joined the Horizon League as IUPUI, representing the former Indiana University–Purdue University Indianapolis (IUPUI). IUPUI was dissolved in 2024 and replaced by separate institutions affiliated with the Indiana University and Purdue University systems. The athletic program transferred to the new IU Indianapolis with a primary branding as IU Indy.) (IU Indianapolis, IU Indy)	Indianapolis, Indiana	1969 (Note: IU Indy did not exist until 2024, but inherited its athletic program from IUPUI, founded in 1969.)	Public	Jaguars	1978	1993	Horizon	both
Indiana University Kokomo	Kokomo, Indiana	1945	Public (Note: Part of the Indiana University System.)	Cougars	2012	2013	River States (RSC)	both
Indiana University Northwest	Gary, Indiana	1959	Public	RedHawks	1998	2019	Chicagoland (CCAC)	both
Indiana University–Purdue University Columbus (Note: Known since 2024 as Indiana University Columbus.) (Note: Before IUPUI was dissolved in 2024, IUPUC had been administered by IUPUI. Upon dissolution, virtually all IUPUC academic programs were transferred to the new IU Columbus, which also inherited the IUPUC athletic program.) (IUPUC)	Columbus, Indiana	1970	Public	Crimson Pride	2022	2023	River States (RSC)	none
Indiana University–Southeast	New Albany, Indiana	1941	Public	Grenadiers	1978	1994	River States (RSC)	both
Indiana University–South Bend	South Bend, Indiana	1966	Public	Titans	1987	2003	Chicagoland (CCAC)	both
Iowa Wesleyan University	Mount Pleasant, Iowa	1856	United; Methodist	Tigers	1974; 2012; 2021 (Note: Iowa Wesleyan left the Independent/AII/Continental ranks after the 2012–13 school year before rejoining in 2021–22 school year and left once again after 2022–23 since the school ceased operations.)	1993; 2013; 2023	Closed in 2023	both
Jacksonville University	Jacksonville, Florida	1934	Nonsectarian	Dolphins	1957	1966	Atlantic Sun (ASUN)	both
Jamestown College (Note: Currently known as the University of Jamestown since 2013.)	Jamestown, North Dakota	1883	Presbyterian (PCUSA)	Jimmies	2012	2013	Northern Sun (NSIC)	both
Johnson & Wales University–Denver	Denver, Colorado	2000	Nonsectarian	Wildcats	2005	2018	Closed in 2021	both
Johnson & Wales University–North Miami	North Miami, Florida	1992	Nonsectarian	Wildcats	2005	2009	Closed in 2021	both
Kennesaw State University	Kennesaw, Georgia (Note: The KSU campus has a Kennesaw mailing address, but is located in unincorporated Cobb County.)	1963	Public	Owls	1982	1983	Conference USA (CUSA)	both
Kentucky Christian University	Grayson, Kentucky	1919	Christian	Knights	2008?	2019	River States (RSC)	both
King College (Note: Known since 2013 as King University.)	Bristol, Tennessee	1867	Presbyterian (Evangelical; Presbyterian/ PCUSA)	Tornado	2009	2010	Carolinas (CC)	both
La Sierra University	Riverside, California	1922	Seventh-day; Adventist	Golden Eagles	2011	2013	California Pacific (CalPac)	both
Lambuth University	Jackson, Tennessee	1843	United; Methodist	Eagles	2008	2009	Closed in 2011	both
Lander University	Greenwood, South Carolina	1872	Public	Bearcats	1968	1990	Peach Belt (PBC)	both
Langston University	Langston, Oklahoma	1897	Public (Note: Governed by the Board of Regents for the Oklahoma Agricultural and Mechanical Colleges.)	Lions	1997	1998	Sooner (SAC)	both
Lawrence Technological University	Southfield, Michigan	1932	Nonsectarian	Blue Devils	2011	2012	Wolverine–Hoosier (WHAC)	both
Life University	Marietta, Georgia	1974	Nonsectarian	Running Eagles	2008; 2013 (Note: Life left the Independent/AII/Continental ranks after the 2011–12 school year, re-joining for only the 2013–14 school year.)	2012; 2014	Southern States (SSAC)	both
Lincoln College	Lincoln, Illinois	1865	Nonsectarian	Lynx	2018	2020	Closed in 2022	both
Lincoln Christian University	Lincoln, Illinois	1944	Christian	Red Lions	2014	2022	Closed in 2024 (Note: Lincoln Christian discontinued its athletics program after the 2021–22 school year, later ceasing operations in 2024.)	both
Lindenwood University at Belleville (Note: This institution held dual membership with the United States Collegiate Athletic Association (USCAA).)	Belleville, Illinois	2003	Presbyterian (PCUSA)	Lynx	2012	2014	Closed in 2020	both
Louisiana State University of Alexandria	Alexandria, Louisiana	1959	Public	Generals	2007	2014	Red River (RRAC)	both
Lourdes University	Sylvania, Ohio	1958	Catholic (Franciscan)	Gray Wolves	2010	2011	Wolverine–Hoosier (WHAC)	both
Lyon College	Batesville, Arkansas	1872	Presbyterian (PCUSA)	Scots	1995	1997	St. Louis (SLIAC)	both
University of Maine at Fort Kent	Fort Kent, Maine	1878	Public (Note: Part of the University of Maine System.)	Bengals	2017	2018	USCAA Independent	both
Marygrove College	Detroit, Michigan	1899	Catholic (I.H.M.)	Mustangs	2008	2012	N/A (Note: Marygrove announced that all athletics would cease after the 2017 fall season (with men's & women's soccer and volleyball remaining) of the 2017–18 academic year; with their August 2017 announcement of the closing of the school's undergraduate programs.)	both
Marymount California University	Rancho Palos Verdes, California	1932	Catholic (R.S.H.M.)	Mariners	2010	2012	Closed in 2022	none
Mayville State University	Mayville, North Dakota	1889	Public	Comets	2012	2013	Frontier	both
University of Missouri–Kansas City (UMKC)	Kansas City, Missouri	1933	Public (Note: Part of the University of Missouri System.)	Kangaroos (Note: UMKC rebranded its athletic program as Kansas City starting in the 2019–20 school year, and has competed as the Roos since that time.)	1969	1994	Summit	both (Note: UMKC's men's basketball team left the NAIA after the 1985–86 school year, but its women's basketball team remained in the association until 1993–94.)
University of Missouri–St. Louis (UMSL)	St. Louis, Missouri	1963	Public	Tritons	1966	1970	Great Lakes Valley (GLVC)	both
Mount Mercy University	Cedar Rapids, Iowa	1928	Catholic (R.S.M.)	Mustangs	2015	2016	Heart of America (HAAC)	both
North American University (Note: This institution also sponsors football.)	Stafford, Texas	2007	Nonsectarian	Stallions	2022	2023	Red River (RRAC)	both
University of North Florida (Note: While in their only season in the NAIA, North Florida began competing as a member of the Division II ranks of the National Collegiate Athletic Association (NCAA), and joined the Sunshine State Conference (SSC) as a provisional member during the 1992–93 school year.)	Jacksonville, Florida	1965	Public	Ospreys	1992	1993	Atlantic Sun (ASUN)	both
Northern New Mexico College	Española, New Mexico	1909	Public	Eagles	2009	2025	California Pacific (CalPac)	both
Northwest Christian University (Note: Known since 2020 as Bushnell University.)	Eugene, Oregon	1895	Disciples of Christ	Beacons	2005	2007	Cascade (CCC)	both
University of Northwestern Ohio	Lima, Ohio	1920	Nonsectarian	Racers	2007 (Note: Northwestern Ohio competed as an Independent while transitioning to join the American Mideast Conference as an associate (provisional) member.)	2008	Wolverine–Hoosier (WHAC)	both
Northwestern Oklahoma State University (Note: Formerly known as Northwestern State College until 1974.)	Alva, Oklahoma	1897	Public	Rangers	1997	1998	Great American (GAC)	both
Ohio Dominican University	Columbus, Ohio	1911	Catholic (O.P.)	Panthers	2009	2010	Great Midwest (G-MAC)	both
Oklahoma Panhandle State University	Goodwell, Oklahoma	1909	Public	Aggies	1997	2002	Sooner (SAC)	both
Oral Roberts University	Tulsa, Oklahoma	1963	Evangelical	Titans (Note: Oral Roberts has competed as the Golden Eagles since the 1993–94 school year.)	1989	1991	Summit	both
Our Lady of the Lake University	San Antonio, Texas	1895	Catholic (C.D.P.)	Saints	2007	2008	Red River (RRAC)	both
College of the Ozarks (CofO)	Point Lookout, Missouri	1906	Presbyterian (PCUSA)	Bobcats	2015; 2023 (Note: The College of the Ozarks (CofO) left the Independent/AII/Continental ranks after the 2020–21 school year before re-joining for only the 2023–24 school year.)	2021; 2024	Sooner (SAC)	both
Patten University	Oakland, California	1944	For-profit	Lions	2005	2012	N/A (Note: Patten dropped its athletic program after the 2011–12 school year.)	none
Penn State–Schuylkill	Schuylkill Haven, Pennsylvania	1934	Public (PSUCC)	Nittany Lions	2018	2024	Penn State (PSUAC) (Note: Current United States Collegiate Athletic Association (USCAA) athletic conference.)	both
Philander Smith College (Note: Currently known as Philander Smith University since 2023.)	Little Rock, Arkansas	1864	United; Methodist	Panthers	2008	2011	HBCU (HBCUAC)	both
University of Regina	Regina, Saskatchewan	1911	Public	Cougars (Note: URegina competes in all sports as the Cougars; with the exception of its football team, which compete as the Rams.) & Rams	2000?	2011	Canada West (CWUAA)	none (Note: URegina was one of many full members within the AII/Continental which competed in a partial status, with men's and women's wrestling; while some of their other sports compete in their primary home conference at the Canada West Universities Athletic Association (Canada West) of U Sports, where it doesn't sponsor wrestling.)
Rochester College (Note: Later known as Rochester University in 2019; now currently known as Rochester Christian University since 2024.)	Rochester Hills, Michigan	1959	Churches of Christ	Warriors	2011	2017	Wolverine–Hoosier (WHAC)	both
Rogers State University	Claremore, Oklahoma	1909	Public	Hillcats	2005	2007	Mid-America (MIAA)	both
Rust College	Holly Springs, Mississippi	1866	United; Methodist	Bearcats	2017	2018	HBCU (HBCUAC)	both
St. Thomas University	Miami Gardens, Florida	1961	Catholic (Archdiocese of Miami)	Bobcats	1987	1990	The Sun (TSC)	both
University of St. Thomas	Houston, Texas	1947	Catholic (C.S.B.)	Celts	2007	2011	Southern (SCAC)	both
Savannah College of Art and Design at Atlanta (SCAD Atlanta)	Atlanta, Georgia	2005	Non-profit art school	Bees	2010	2012	Appalachian (AAC)	none
Savannah College of Art and Design (SCAD Savannah)	Savannah, Georgia	1978	Non-profit art school	Bees	2003	2004	The Sun (TSC)	none (Note: Savannah A&D had sponsored men's or women's basketball until after the 2008–09 school year.)
Simon Fraser University	Burnaby, British Columbia	1965	Public	Clan (Note: Nickname was used until spring 2020. Since fall 2022, its current nickname is Red Leafs.)	2000?	2010	Great Northwest (GNAC) (CWUAA in 2027)	none (Note: Simon Fraser was one of many full members within the AII/Continental which competed in a partial status, with men's and women's cross country, men's and women's indoor and outdoor track and field, men's and women's soccer, men's and women's swimming and diving, softball and wrestling as the only sponsored sports; while some of their other sports compete in their primary home conference at the Canada West Universities Athletic Association (Canada West) of U Sports, where it doesn't sponsor neither of those previously mentioned sports (although the CWUAA also sponsors soccer).)
Soka University of America	Aliso Viejo, California	2001	Nonsectarian	Lions	2007	2012	California Pacific (CalPac)	none
University of South Carolina Beaufort (USC Beaufort)	Beaufort, South Carolina	1959	Public	Sand Sharks	2022	2023	Peach Belt (PBC)	both (Note: Initially a non-basketball core member school, until South Carolina–Beaufort (USC Beaufort) began sponosoring men's and women's basketball in the 2023–24 school year.)
Southeastern University	Lakeland, Florida	1935	Assemblies of God	Fire	2008	2009	The Sun (TSC)	both
Southern Virginia University	Buena Vista, Virginia	1867	LDS Church	Knights	2008	2012	USA South	both
Spartanburg Methodist College	Saxon, South Carolina	1911	United; Methodist	Pioneers	2024	2025	Appalachian (AAC)	both
State University of New York at Delhi (Note: This institution held dual membership with the National Junior College Athletic Association (NJCAA).) (Note: At the time of its tenure within the NAIA, SUNY Delhi was also a member of the Mountain Valley Athletic Conference (MVAC) within the National Junior College Athletic Association (NJCAA) until after the 2014–15 school year.) (SUNY Delhi)	Delhi, New York	1913	Public (Note: Part of the State University of New York System.)	Broncos	2004?	2010	North Atlantic (NAC)	both
Stillman College	Tuscaloosa, Alabama	1876	Presbyterian (PCUSA)	Tigers	2016	2018	HBCU (HBCUAC)	both
Stephens College	Columbia, Missouri	1833	Nonsectarian	Stars	2004	2008	American Midwest	women's
Talladega College	Talladega, Alabama	1867	United Church of Christ	Tornadoes	2008	2011	HBCU (HBCUAC)	both
Tennessee Temple University	Chattanooga, Tennessee	1895	Nondenominational	Crusaders	2006	2008	N/A (Note: Tennessee Temple was merged into Piedmont International University, now known as Carolina University, after spring 2015.)	both
Texas A&M University–Texarkana	Texarkana, Texas	1971	Public (Note: Part of the Texas A&M University System.)	Eagles	2014	2016	Red River (RRAC)	both
Trinity Lutheran College	Everett, Washington	1944	Lutheran	Eagles	2014	2016	Closed in 2016	none
Truett McConnell College (Note: Currently known as Truett McConnell University since 2016.)	Cleveland, Georgia	1946	Baptist	Bears	2009	2010	Appalachian (AAC)	both
University of Science and Arts of Oklahoma	Chickasha, Oklahoma	1908	Public (Note: Governed by the Board of Regents of the University of Science & Arts of Oklahoma.)	Drovers	1997	1998	Sooner (SAC)	both
Valley City State University	Valley City, North Dakota	1890	Public	Vikings	2012	2013	Frontier	both
University of the Virgin Islands (UVI)	Charlotte Amalie, U.S. Virgin Islands	1962	Public	Buccaneers	2016	2023	HBCU (HBCUAC)	both
Voorhees University (Note: Formerly known as Voorhees College until 2022.)	Denmark, South Carolina	1897	Episcopal	Tigers	2005; 2015 (Note: Voorhees left the Independent/AII/Continental ranks after the 2012–13 school year before re-joining in the 2015–16 school year.)	2013; 2024	HBCU (HBCUAC)	both
Walla Walla University	College Place, Washington	1892	Seventh-day; Adventist	Wolves	2008	2015	Cascade (CCC)	both
Warren Wilson College	Swannanoa, North Carolina	1894	Presbyterian (PCUSA)	Owls	2010	2012	Coast to Coast (C2C)	both
West Virginia University Institute of Technology (WVU Tech)	Beckley, West Virginia (Note: When WVU Tech joined the AII/Continental in 2012, it was located in Montgomery, West Virginia. Freshman classes were first held in Beckley in 2016; all other academic programs, as well as the administration and athletic program, moved to Beckley in 2017.)	1895	Public (Note: Part of the West Virginia University System.)	Golden Bears	2012	2015	River States (RSC)	both
Wilberforce University	Wilberforce, Ohio	1856	A.M.E. Church	Bulldogs	2012; 2023 (Note: Wilberforce left the Independent/AII/Continental ranks after the 2021–22 school year before re-joining for only the 2023–24 school year.)	2022; 2024	HBCU (HBCUAC)	both
University of Winnipeg	Winnipeg, Manitoba	1871	Public	Wesmen	2014	2015	Canada West (CWUAA)	none (Note: UWinnipeg was one of many full members within the AII/Continental which competed in a partial status, with baseball as the only sponsored sport; while some of their other sports compete in their primary home conference at the Canada West Universities Athletic Association (Canada West) of U Sports, where it doesn't sponsor baseball.)
University of Wisconsin–Green Bay	Green Bay, Wisconsin	1965	Public	Phoenix	1969	1973	Horizon	both
University of Wisconsin–Milwaukee	Milwaukee, Wisconsin	1956	Public	Panthers	1985	1987	Horizon	both
York College (Note: Currently known as York University since 2022.)	York, Nebraska	1890	Churches of Christ	Panthers	2015	2016	Kansas (KCAC)	both
Youngstown State University	Youngstown, Ohio	1908	Public	Penguins	1942	1960	Horizon	both

=== Former partial members ===
Institution	Location	Founded	Affiliation	Nickname	Joined (Note: Represents the calendar year when fall sports competition begins.)	Left (Note: Represents the calendar year when spring sports competition ends.)	AII/CAC sport(s)	Current primary conference
Brescia University	Owensboro, Kentucky	1925	Catholic (Ursulines)	Bearcats	1984?	2009 (Note: Brescia's basketball teams moved into the River States Conference (RSC) alongside its other sports after the 2008–09 school year.)	Men's basketball	River States (RSC)
Brescia University	Owensboro, Kentucky	1925	Catholic (Ursulines)	Bearcats	1984?	2009	Women's basketball	River States (RSC)
Cottey College (Note: This institution is a women's college, therefore it does not field men's sports.)	Nevada, Missouri	1884	Nonsectarian	Comets	2022	2023	Women's cross country	American Midwest
Cottey College	Nevada, Missouri	1884	Nonsectarian	Comets	2022	2023	Women's golf	American Midwest
Dillard University	New Orleans, Louisiana	1869	United; Methodist & U.C.C. (Note: Also a historically black college and university.)	Bleu Devils & Lady Bleu Devils	2023	2024	Softball	HBCU (HBCUAC)
Edward Waters University (Note: Formerly known as Edward Waters College until 2021.) (Note: Edward Waters remained in its primary conference home (the HBCUAC, then known as the GCAC) to compete in conference tournaments for all sponsored sports during the provisional transition until after the 2021–22 school year.)	Jacksonville, Florida	1866	A.M.E. Church	Tigers	2021	2022	Women's soccer	Southern (SIAC) (Note: Currently an NCAA Division II athletic conference.)
Edward Waters University	Jacksonville, Florida	1866	A.M.E. Church	Tigers	2021	2022	Baseball	Southern (SIAC)
Edward Waters University	Jacksonville, Florida	1866	A.M.E. Church	Tigers	2021	2022	Softball	Southern (SIAC)
Fisk University (Note: Fisk remains as a partial member for men's and women's golf.)	Nashville, Tennessee	1866	U.C.C.	Bulldogs	2021	2024	Men's soccer	HBCU (HBCUAC)
Jarvis Christian University	Hawkins, Texas	1912	Disciples of Christ	Bulldogs	2021	2023	Women's golf	Red River (RRAC)
University of Jamestown	Jamestown, North Dakota	1883	Presbyterian (PCUSA)	Jimmies	2024	2025	Men's soccer	Northern Sun (NSIC)
University of Jamestown	Jamestown, North Dakota	1883	Presbyterian (PCUSA)	Jimmies	2024	2025	Women's soccer	Northern Sun (NSIC)
La Sierra University	Riverside, California	1922	Seventh-day; Adventist	Golden Eagles	2024	2025	Softball	Great Southwest (GSAC)
Lincoln College	Lincoln, Illinois	1865	Nonsectarian	Lynx	2021	2022	Men's cross country	Closed in 2022
Lincoln College	Lincoln, Illinois	1865	Nonsectarian	Lynx	2021	2022	Men's golf	Closed in 2022
Lincoln College	Lincoln, Illinois	1865	Nonsectarian	Lynx	2021	2022	Women's golf	Closed in 2022
Mountain State University	Beckley, West Virginia	1933	Nonsectarian	Cougars	1977?	2009 (Note: Mountain State's men's basketball team moved into the River States Conference (RSC) alongside its other sports after the 2008–09 school year; while its women's basketball team remained in the AII until the school closed after spring 2012.)	Men's basketball	Closed in 2012
Mountain State University	Beckley, West Virginia	1933	Nonsectarian	Cougars	1980	2012	Women's basketball	Closed in 2012
Oakwood University	Huntsville, Alabama	1896	Seventh-day; Adventist	Ambassadors	2023	2024	Softball	HBCU (HBCUAC)
Oakwood University	Huntsville, Alabama	1896	Seventh-day; Adventist	Ambassadors	2023	2025	Men's soccer	HBCU (HBCUAC)
Oakwood University	Huntsville, Alabama	1896	Seventh-day; Adventist	Ambassadors	2023	2025	Women's soccer	HBCU (HBCUAC)
Our Lady of the Lake University (Note: Our Lady of the Laker (OLLU) remains as a partial member for women's golf.)	San Antonio, Texas	1895	Catholic (C.D.P.)	Saints	2021	2022	Men's golf	Red River (RRAC)
Park University	Parkville, Missouri	1875	Nonsectarian	Pirates	1994	2009 (Note: Park's basketball teams, alongside its other sports, moved into the American Midwest Conference from its previous primary conference home, the Midlands Collegiate Athletic Conference (MCAC), after the 2008–09 school year.)	Men's basketball	Heart of America (HAAC)
Park University	Parkville, Missouri	1875	Nonsectarian	Pirates	1994	2009	Women's basketball	Heart of America (HAAC)
Rust College	Holly Springs, Mississippi	1866	United; Methodist	Bearcats	2021	2022	Baseball	HBCU (HBCUAC)
Rust College	Holly Springs, Mississippi	1866	United; Methodist	Bearcats	2021	2024	Softball	HBCU (HBCUAC)
Simpson University	Redding, California	1921	Christian & Missionary; Alliance	Red Hawks	2024	2025	Softball	California Pacific (CalPac)
University of the Southwest	Hobbs, New Mexico	1962	Nondenominational	Mustangs	2021	2022	Men's golf	Red River (RRAC)
University of the Southwest	Hobbs, New Mexico	1962	Nondenominational	Mustangs	2021	2023	Women's golf	Red River (RRAC)
State University of New York at Delhi (Note: This institution held dual membership with the National Junior College Athletic Association (NJCAA).) (Note: At the time of its tenure within the NAIA, SUNY Delhi was also a member of the Mountain Valley Athletic Conference (MVAC) within the National Junior College Athletic Association (NJCAA) until after the 2014–15 school year.) (SUNY Delhi)	Delhi, New York	1913	Public (Note: Part of the State University of New York System.)	Broncos	2009	2018	Men's golf	North Atlantic (NAC) (Note: Currently an NCAA Division III athletic conference.)
State University of New York at Delhi (SUNY Delhi)	Delhi, New York	1913	Public	Broncos	2012	2018	Women's golf	North Atlantic (NAC)
Talladega College (Note: Talladega remains as a partial member for men's golf.)	Talladega, Alabama	1867	U.C.C.	Tornadoes	2023	2024	Softball	HBCU (HBCUAC)
Talladega College	Talladega, Alabama	1867	U.C.C.	Tornadoes	2023	2025	Men's soccer	HBCU (HBCUAC)
Talladega College	Talladega, Alabama	1867	U.C.C.	Tornadoes	2023	2025	Women's soccer	HBCU (HBCUAC)
Texas A&M University–Victoria (Note: Formerly known as the University of Houston–Victoria (UHV) until 2025.)	Victoria, Texas	1973	Public	Jaguars	2021	2022	Men's golf	Red River (RRAC)
Texas A&M University–Victoria	Victoria, Texas	1973	Public	Jaguars	2021	2023	Women's golf	Red River (RRAC)
Tougaloo College	Tougaloo, Mississippi	1869	U.C.C. & Disciples of Christ	Bulldogs	2021	2022	Baseball	HBCU (HBCUAC)
Tougaloo College	Tougaloo, Mississippi	1869	U.C.C. & Disciples of Christ	Bulldogs	2021	2023	Men's golf	HBCU (HBCUAC)
Tougaloo College	Tougaloo, Mississippi	1869	U.C.C. & Disciples of Christ	Bulldogs	2021	2023	Women's golf	HBCU (HBCUAC)
Tougaloo College	Tougaloo, Mississippi	1869	U.C.C. & Disciples of Christ	Bulldogs	2022	2025	Men's soccer	HBCU (HBCUAC)
Tougaloo College	Tougaloo, Mississippi	1869	U.C.C. & Disciples of Christ	Bulldogs	2022	2025	Women's soccer	HBCU (HBCUAC)
Viterbo University	La Crosse, Wisconsin	1923	Catholic (Diocese of Davenport)	V-Hawks	2021	2023	Men's soccer	Chicagoland (CCAC)
Viterbo University	La Crosse, Wisconsin	1923	Catholic (Diocese of Davenport)	V-Hawks	2021	2023	Women's soccer	Chicagoland (CCAC)
Waldorf University (Note: Formerly known as Waldorf College until 2016.)	Forest City, Iowa	1903	For-profit	Warriors	2021	2023	Men's soccer	Great Plains (GPAC)
Waldorf University	Forest City, Iowa	1903	For-profit	Warriors	2021	2023	Women's soccer	Great Plains (GPAC)
Wiley University	Marshall, Texas	1873	United; Methodist	Wildcats	2023	2025	Men's soccer	HBCU (HBCUAC)
Wiley University	Marshall, Texas	1873	United; Methodist	Wildcats	2023	2025	Women's soccer	HBCU (HBCUAC)

== Sports ==
Conference sports
Sport	Men's	Women's
Baseball	✓	
Basketball	✓	✓
Cross Country	✓	✓
Golf	✓	✓
Soccer	✓	✓
Softball		✓
Track & Field Outdoor	✓	✓
Volleyball		✓

== See also ==
- NAIA independent football schools
- NCAA Division I independent schools
- NCAA Division II independent schools
- NCAA Division III independent schools
