= Great Southwest Athletic Conference =

American college athletic conference

- Association: NAIA
- Founded: 1986; 40 years ago
- Commissioner: Mike Daniels (2012–)
- Sports fielded: 17; men's: 8; women's: 9
- No. of teams: 11 (12 in 2027)
- Headquarters: Aliso Viejo, California
- Region: Western United States
- Website: gsacsports.org

Locations
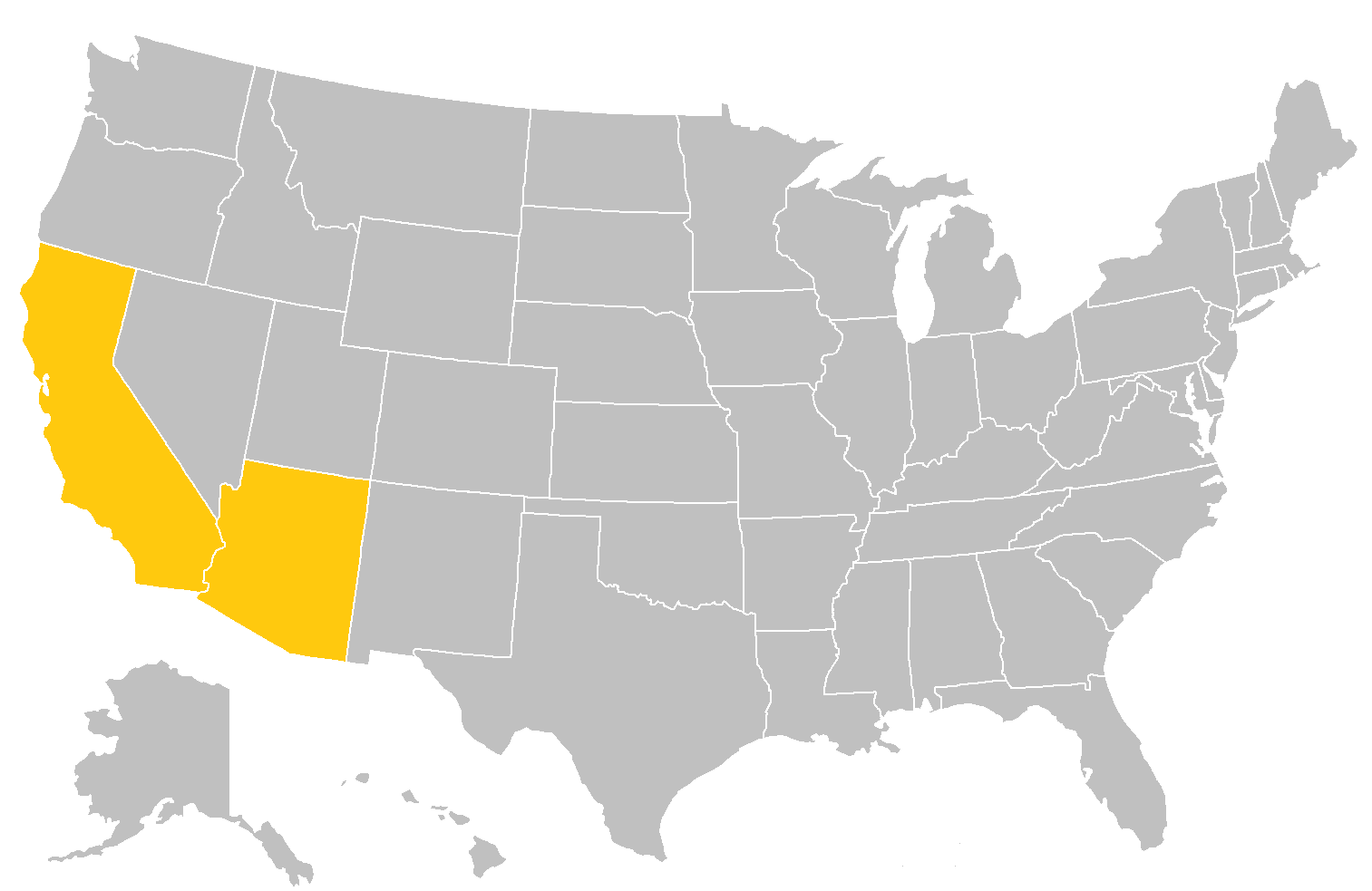

The Great Southwest Athletic Conference (GSAC), formerly known as the Golden State Athletic Conference, is a college athletic conference affiliated with the National Association of Intercollegiate Athletics (NAIA). The conference commissioner is Mike Daniels. Conference leadership is shared among the member institutions. Seven of the eight members of the GSAC are Christian colleges located in California and Arizona. Conference teams have won 22 national championships.

== History ==
Great Southwest Athletic Conference
Location of GSAC members: current, future

Old logo

The Golden State Athletic Conference was formed in the fall of 1986, with Azusa Pacific University, California Lutheran University, Fresno Pacific University, Point Loma Nazarene University, Vanguard University and Westmont College as the charter members. California Baptist University and Concordia University joined the GSAC in the fall of the following year (1987). Cal Lutheran left the GSAC after the spring of 1989. Biola University joined the GSAC in the fall of 1994. Hope International University and San Diego Christian College joined the GSAC in the fall of 1999. The Master's University, joined the GSAC in the fall of 2001. Lewis–Clark State College of Lewiston, Idaho joined the GSAC as an affiliate member for men's and women's tennis in 2016.

=== Recent years ===
In recent years, the conference has seen changes with members leaving the GSAC and the NAIA for the NCAA. In 2011 Cal Baptist left the GSAC to join the Pacific West Conference followed by the announcement that Azusa Pacific, Fresno Pacific and Point Loma Nazarene joined Cal Baptist in the PacWest in 2012. Concordia then left to join the PacWest in 2015, and Biola applied to make the same move in 2017. To replace these schools, the GSAC has added Arizona Christian, Menlo and William Jessup (now known as Jessup). Life Pacific joined in 2017 and Ottawa (AZ) joined in 2018 to bring the GSAC to 10 members.

The departures to the NCAA continued into the 2020s, with Westmont departing for the PacWest in 2023 and Jessup, Menlo, and Vanguard all following in 2024. To combat this, the GSAC added Benedictine–Mesa, Embry–Riddle at Prescott and Park–Gilbert, to bring membership back to 8 members. Immediately following these additions, the GSAC announced that it would undergo a rebrand to the Great Southwest Athletic Conference, to reflect its membership now including schools located outside of California.

=== Chronological timeline ===
- 1986 – The Golden State Athletic Conference (GSAC) was founded. Charter members included Azusa Pacific University, California Lutheran University (a.k.a. Cal Lutheran), Fresno Pacific College (now Fresno Pacific University), Point Loma Nazarene College (now Point Loma Nazarene University), Southern California College (now Vanguard University of Southern California) and Westmont College, beginning the 1986–87 academic year.
- 1987 – California Baptist College (now California Baptist University; a.k.a. Cal Baptist) and Christ College Irvine (now Concordia University Irvine) joined the GSAC in the 1987–88 academic year.
- 1989 – Cal Lutheran left the GSAC to become an independent (before joining the Division III ranks of the National Collegiate Athletic Association (NCAA) and the Southern California Intercollegiate Athletic Conference (SCIAC) beginning the 1991–92 academic year) after the 1988–89 academic year.
- 1994 – Biola University joined the GSAC in the 1994–95 academic year.
- 1999 – Pacific Christian College (now Hope International University) and San Diego Christian College joined the GSAC in the 1999–2000 academic year.
- 2001 – The Master's College (now The Master's University) joined the GSAC in the 2001–02 academic year.
- 2011 – Cal Baptist left the GSAC and the NAIA to join the NCAA Division II ranks and the Pacific West Conference (PacWest) after the 2010–11 academic year.
- 2012 – Azusa Pacific, Fresno Pacific and Point Loma Nazarene left the GSAC and the NAIA to join the NCAA Division II ranks and the PacWest after the 2011–12 academic year.
- 2012 – Arizona Christian University joined the GSAC in the 2012–13 academic year.
- 2014 – William Jessup University (now Jessup University) joined the GSAC in the 2012–13 academic year.
- 2015 – Concordia–Irvine left the GSAC and the NAIA to join the NCAA Division II ranks and the PacWest after the 2014–15 academic year.
- 2015 – Menlo College joined the GSAC in the 2015–16 academic year.
- 2015 – Lewis–Clark State College joined the GSAC as an affiliate member for men's and women's tennis in the 2016 spring season (2015–16 academic year).
- 2017 – Biola left the GSAC and the NAIA to join the NCAA Division II ranks and the PacWest after the 2016–17 academic year.
- 2017 – Lewis–Clark State left the GSAC as an affiliate member for men's and women's tennis after the 2017 spring season (2016–17 academic year).
- 2017 – Life Pacific College (now Life Pacific University) joined the GSAC in the 2017–18 academic year.
- 2018 – Ottawa University–Arizona joined the GSAC in the 2018–19 academic year.
- 2018 – Marymount California University and the University of Saint Katherine joined the GSAC as affiliate members for men's and women's tennis in the 2019 spring season (2018–19 academic year).
- 2020 – Westcliff University joined the GSAC as an affiliate member for men's tennis in the 2021 spring season (2020–21 academic year).
- 2021 – Westcliff added women's tennis into its GSAC affiliate membership in the 2022 spring season (2021–22 academic year).
- 2022 – Two institutions left the GSAC as affiliate members (and/or removed other single sports from their affiliate memberships), all effective after the 2021–22 academic year:
  - Marymount (Cal.) for men's and women's tennis; as the school ceased operations
  - and Saint Katherine for women's tennis
- 2023 – Westmont left the GSAC and the NAIA to join the NCAA Division II ranks and the PacWest after the 2022–23 academic year.
- 2023 – San Diego Christian left the GSAC after the 2022–23 academic year; as the school was placing their athletic department on hiatus since.
- 2024 – Jessup, Menlo and Vanguard left the GSAC and the NAIA to join the NCAA Division II ranks and the PacWest after the 2023–24 academic year.
- 2024 – Westcliff left the GSAC as an affiliate member for men's and women's tennis after the 2023–24 academic year:
- 2024 – Benedictine University at Mesa, Embry–Riddle Aeronautical University, Prescott and Park University Gilbert joined the GSAC in the 2024–25 academic year. Then-affiliate member for men's tennis Saint Katherine (USK) was also alongside those three prior schools at the same time; however, the school ceased operations before they could make the move.
- 2024 – The GSAC has rebranded as the Great Southwest Athletic Conference, effective in the 2024–25 academic year.
- 2025 – La Sierra University and Soka University of America joined the GSAC in the 2025–26 academic year.
- 2026 – Nevada State University joined the GSAC in the 2026–27 academic year.
- 2027 – Yavapai College will join the GSAC, beginning the 2027–28 academic year.

== Member schools ==
=== Current members ===
The GSAC currently has eleven full members, all but one are private schools:

Institution	Location	Founded	Affiliation	Enrollment	Nickname	Joined (Note: Represents the calendar year when fall sports competition begins.)	Basketball?
Arizona Christian University	Glendale, Arizona	1960	Nondenominational	1,233	Firestorm	2012	both
Benedictine University at Mesa	Mesa, Arizona	2013	Catholic (Benedictines)	340	Redhawks	2024	both
Embry–Riddle Aeronautical University–Prescott	Prescott, Arizona	1978	Nonsectarian	3,286	Eagles	2024	both
Hope International University	Fullerton, California	1928	Nondenominational	1,140	Royals	1999	both
La Sierra University	Riverside, California	1922	Seventh-day; Adventist	1,611	Golden Eagles	2025	both
Life Pacific University	San Dimas, California	1923	Foursquare Gospel	504	Warriors	2017	both
The Master's University	Santa Clarita, California	1927	Nondenominational	2,799	Mustangs	2001	both
Nevada State University	Henderson, Nevada	2002	Public	7,549	Scorpions	2026	none
Ottawa University–Arizona	Surprise, Arizona	2015	American Baptist	836	Spirit	2018	both
Park University–Gilbert	Gilbert, Arizona	2018	Nonsectarian	300	Buccaneers	2024	both
Soka University of America	Aliso Viejo, California	2001	Nonsectarian	476	Lions	2025	none

=== Future members ===
The GSAC will have one new full member, a public school:

Institution	Location	Founded	Affiliation	Enrollment	Nickname	Joining (Note: Represents the calendar year when fall sports competition begins.)	Current conference	Basketball?
Yavapai College	Prescott, Arizona	1965	Public	7,428	Roughriders	2027	Arizona (ACCAC) (Note: Currently an NJCAA athletic conference.)	both

=== Former members ===
The GSAC had twelve former full members, all were private schools:

Institution	Location	Founded	Affiliation	Nickname	Joined (Note: Represents the calendar year when fall sports competition begins.)	Left (Note: Represents the calendar year when spring sports competition ends.)	Subsequent conference(s)	Current conference
Azusa Pacific University	Azusa, California	1899	Interdenominational	Cougars	1986	2012	Pacific West (PacWest) (Note: Currently an NCAA Division II athletic conference.) (2012–present)	
Biola University	La Mirada, California	1908	Nondenominational	Eagles	1994	2017	Pacific West (PacWest) (2017–present)	
California Baptist University	Riverside, California	1950	Baptist	Lancers	1987	2011	Pacific West (PacWest) (2011–18)	Western (WAC) (Note: Currently an NCAA Division I athletic conference.) (2018–26) (Big West (BWC) in 2026)
California Lutheran University	Thousand Oaks, California	1959	Lutheran ELCA	Kingsmen & Regals	1986	1989	NAIA/D-III Independent (1989–91)	Southern California (SCIAC) (Note: Currently an NCAA Division III athletic conference.) (1991–present)
Concordia University–Irvine	Irvine, California	1976	Lutheran LCMS	Eagles	1987	2015	Pacific West (PacWest) (2015–present)	
Fresno Pacific University	Fresno, California	1944	Mennonite	Sunbirds	1986	2012	Pacific West (PacWest) (2012–present)	
Jessup University	Rocklin, California	1939	Nondenominational	Warriors	2014	2024	Pacific West (PacWest) (2024–present)	
Menlo College	Atherton, California	1927	Nonsectarian	Oaks	2015	2024	Pacific West (PacWest) (2024–present)	
Point Loma Nazarene University	San Diego, California	1902	Nazarene	Sea Lions	1986	2012	Pacific West (PacWest) (2012–present)	
San Diego Christian College	Santee, California	1970	Nondenominational	Hawks	1999	2023	N/A (Note: San Diego Christian suspended all their athletic programs after the 2022–23 school year.)	
Vanguard University of Southern California	Costa Mesa, California	1920	Assemblies of God	Lions	1986	2024	Pacific West (PacWest) (2024–present)	
Westmont College	Montecito, California	1937	Christian	Warriors	1986	2023	Pacific West (PacWest) (2023–present)	

=== Former affiliate members ===
The GSAC had four former affiliate members, one was a public school and three were private schools:

Institution	Location	Founded	Affiliation	Nickname	Joined (Note: Represents the calendar year when fall sports competition begins.)	Left (Note: Represents the calendar year when spring sports competition ends.)	GSAC sport(s)	Primary conference
Lewis–Clark State College	Lewiston, Idaho	1893	Public	Warriors & Lady Warriors	2015	2017	Men's tennis	Cascade (CCC)
Lewis–Clark State College	Lewiston, Idaho	1893	Public	Warriors & Lady Warriors	2015	2017	Women's tennis	Cascade (CCC)
Marymount California University	Rancho Palos Verdes, California	1932	Catholic (R.S.H.M.)	Mariners	2018	2022	Men's tennis	Closed in 2022
Marymount California University	Rancho Palos Verdes, California	1932	Catholic (R.S.H.M.)	Mariners	2018	2022	Women's tennis	Closed in 2022
University of Saint Katherine	San Marcos, California	2010	Eastern; Orthodox	Firebirds	2018	2024	Men's tennis	Closed in 2024
University of Saint Katherine	San Marcos, California	2010	Eastern; Orthodox	Firebirds	2018	2024	Women's tennis	Closed in 2024
Westcliff University	Irvine, California	1993	For-profit	Warriors	2020	2024	Men's tennis	California Pacific (CalPac)
Westcliff University	Irvine, California	1993	For-profit	Warriors	2021	2024	Women's tennis	California Pacific (CalPac)

=== Membership timeline ===
Full member (non-football) Associate member (sport)

== Sports sponsored ==
Conference sports
Sport	Men's	Women's
Baseball	✓	
Basketball	✓	✓
Cross Country	✓	✓
Soccer	✓	✓
Softball		✓
Tennis	✓	✓
Track & Field Outdoor	✓	✓
Volleyball	✓	✓
Beach Volleyball		✓
Golf	✓	✓
