= California Pacific Conference =

American college athletic conference

- Association: NAIA
- Founded: 1996; 30 years ago
- Folded: 2027
- Commissioner: Don Ott
- Sports fielded: 12; men's: 6; women's: 6
- No. of teams: 5
- Headquarters: Oakland, California
- Region: Western
- Website: calpacathletics.com

Locations
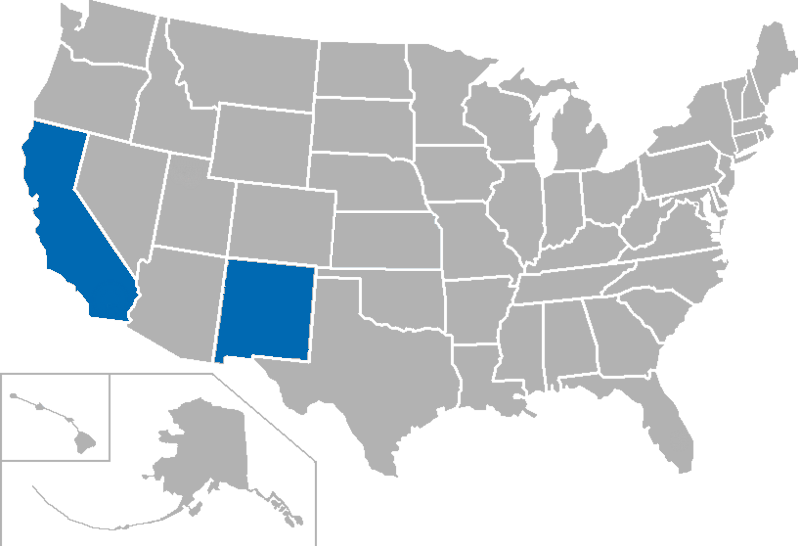

The California Pacific Conference (Cal Pac) is a college athletic conference affiliated with the National Association of Intercollegiate Athletics (NAIA). The conference commissioner is Don Ott. Conference leadership is shared among the member institutions. The secretary is Marv Christopher of Cal Poly Maritime Academy. The conference was formed in 1996.

On October 12, 2026, the conference announced that it would disband following the 2026–27 school year.

== History ==
California Pacific Conference
Location of Cal Pac members: current

California State University at East Bay, California State University at Monterey Bay, Dominican University, Mills College, and Notre Dame de Namur University are former members of the conference that have left the Cal Pac and the NAIA for the Division II and Division III ranks of the National Collegiate Athletic Association (NCAA).

- Cal State–Monterey Bay and Cal State–East Bay left the Cal Pac to join the NCAA Division II California Collegiate Athletic Association (CCAA) in the 2004–05 and 2008–09 seasons, respectively.
- Patten University left the Cal Pac when the school chose to discontinue its athletic program after the 2004–05 season.
- Notre Dame de Namur left the Cal Pac to join the NCAA Division II Pacific West Conference in the 2006–07 season, followed by Dominican in the 2008–09 season.
- Mills moved to NCAA Division III as an Independent in the 2011–12 season.

In June 2011, Bethany University announced it was ceasing operations effective immediately, decreasing the Cal Pac to seven active members.

In 2012, Holy Names University left the Cal Pac to join the Pacific West Conference; while Embry–Riddle Aeronautical University at Prescott, Marymount California University, and Soka University of America joined to increase the conference membership to nine schools.

La Sierra University joined in 2013 to bring the conference up to 10 members. William Jessup University left in 2014, leaving the conference with nine members. Membership rose to twelve schools in 2015 when the University of Antelope Valley, Benedictine University at Mesa, Providence Christian College, and Sierra Nevada University joined; while Menlo College left for the Golden State Athletic Conference.

The University of Saint Katherine joined in 2019. In March 2020, the conference announced two additions for the 2020–21 academic year when Park University at Gilbert and Westcliff University were admitted to the NAIA.

Sierra Nevada approved in July 2021 an agreement to merge with NCAA Division I's University of Nevada, Reno (Nevada). The merger was given accreditation approval in late December and scheduled for completion before 2022–23, leading to Sierra Nevada's departure from Cal Pac.

On September 20, 2024, Cal Maritime announced it would withdraw from NAIA and Cal Pac membership at the conclusion of the 2024–25 academic year. However, it later reneged on this decision and remained a Cal Pac and NAIA member through the 2025–26 academic year.

On December 20, 2024, Northern New Mexico College and Stanton University had accepted an invite as full members to join the Cal Pac, with the latter contingent on NAIA approval for membership, while Walla Walla University accepted an invite as an affiliate member for men's volleyball; all effective beginning the 2025–26 academic year. Later on, Central Christian College of Kansas also joined the Cal Pac as an affiliate member for men's volleyball for the upcoming academic year.

=== Chronological timeline ===
- 1995 – The California Pacific Conference (Cal Pac) was founded. Charter members included Bethany College (later Bethany University), California Maritime Academy (later California Polytechnic State University Maritime Academy, or Cal Poly Maritime), California State University at Monterey Bay (Cal State–Monterey Bay or CSUMB), Dominican College (now the Dominican University of California), Holy Names College (now Holy Names University), Menlo College, Pacific Union College, Patten College (now Patten University) and Simpson College (now Simpson University), beginning the 1996–97 academic year.
- 1998 – California State University at Hayward (now California State University East Bay, a.k.a. Cal State–East Bay or CSUEB) and the College of Notre Dame (later Notre Dame de Namur University) joined the Cal Pac in the 1998–99 academic year.
- 1999 – Mills College joined the Cal Pac in the 1999–2000 academic year.
- 2004:
  - Cal State–Monterey Bay (CSUMB) left the Cal Pac to join the Division II ranks of the National Collegiate Athletic Association (NCAA) and the California Collegiate Athletic Association (CCAA) after the 2003–04 academic year.
  - William Jessup University (now Jessup University) joined the Cal Pac in the 2004–05 academic year.
- 2005 – Patten left the Cal Pac to become an NAIA Independent after the 2004–05 academic year.
- 2006 – Notre Dame de Namur left the Cal Pac to join the NCAA Division II ranks and the Pacific West Conference (PacWest) after the 2005–06 academic year.
- 2009 – Two institutions left the Cal Pac and the NAIA to join the NCAA Division II ranks and to their respective new home primary conferences, both after the 2008–09 academic year:
  - Cal State–East Bay (CSUEB) to the CCAA
  - and Dominican (Cal.) to the PacWest
- 2011 – The University of California, Merced (UC Merced) joined the Cal Pac in the 2011–12 academic year.
- 2012:
  - Holy Names left the Cal Pac and the NAIA to join the NCAA Division II ranks and the PacWest after the 2011–12 academic year.
  - Embry–Riddle Aeronautical University–Prescott, Marymount California University and Soka University of America joined the Cal Pac in the 2012–13 academic year.
- 2013 – La Sierra University joined the Cal Pac in the 2013–14 academic year.
- 2014 – William Jessup left the Cal Pac to join the Golden State Athletic Conference (GSAC; now the Great Southwest Athletic Conference) after the 2013–14 academic year.
- 2015:
  - Menlo left the Cal Pac to join the GSAC after the 2014–15 academic year.
  - The University of Antelope Valley, Benedictine University at Mesa, Providence Christian College and Sierra Nevada College (later Sierra Nevada University) joined the Cal Pac in the 2015–16 academic year.
- 2019 – The University of Saint Katherine joined the Cal Pac in the 2019–20 academic year.
- 2020 – Park University Gilbert and Westcliff University joined the Cal Pac in the 2020–21 academic year.
- 2021 – Sierra Nevada left the Cal Pac at the end of the 2021–22 academic year; as the school announced plans to merge with the University of Nevada, Reno, dropping all athletic programs in the process.
- 2022 – Marymount California left the Cal Pac after the 2021–22 academic year; as the school announced its closure in August of that year.
- 2024:
  - Five institutions left the Cal Pac to join their respective new home primary conferences, all effective after the 2023–24 academic year:
    - Antelope Valley when the school suddenly closed after an order from the state of California to cease operations
    - St. Katherine ahead of its planned departure to the GSAC, as the university announced it would cease all operations
    - and Benedictine–Mesa, Embry-Riddle Prescott, and Park–Gilbert all left the Cal Pac to join the GSAC
- 2025:
  - Four institutions left the Cal Pac to join their respective new home primary conferences, all effective after the 2024–25 academic year:
    - La Sierra and Soka to join the GSAC
    - UC Merced to join the NCAA Division II ranks and the CCAA
    - and Providence Christian to discontinue its athletics programs
  - Northern New Mexico College and Stanton University joined the Cal Pac in the 2025–26 academic year.
  - Central Christian College of Kansas and Walla Walla University joined the Cal Pac as affiliate members for men's volleyball, beginning the 2026 spring season (2025–26 academic year).
- 2026:
  - Central Christian (Ks.) left the Cal Pac as an affiliate member for men's volleyball after the 2026 spring season (2025–26 academic year).
  - Cal Maritime left the Cal Pac after the 2025–26 academic year; as the school discontinued its athletics program while it was merged into Cal Poly at San Luis Obispo as a satellite campus.
  - Two institutions joined the Cal Pac as affiliate members, both effective beginning the 2026–27 academic year:
    - Dakota State University for women's soccer
    - and Fisher College for men's volleyball
- 2027 – The Cal Pac will cease operations as an athletic conference after the 2026–27 academic year. Simpson will join the Cascade Collegiate Conference (CCC), while the remaining members (Northern New Mexico, Pacific Union, Stanton, and Westcliff) have not yet announced any plans to join a new conference following the Cal Pac's dissolution.

== Member schools ==
=== Current members ===
The Cal Pac currently has 5 full members, all but one are private schools:

Institution	Location	Founded	Affiliation	Enrollment	Nickname	Joined (Note: Represents the calendar year when fall sports competition begins.)
Northern New Mexico College	Española, New Mexico	1909	Public	1,310	Eagles	2025
Pacific Union College	Angwin, California	1882	Seventh-day; Adventist	938	Pioneers	1996
Simpson University (Note: Simpson will join the Cascade Collegiate Conference (CCC), beginning in the 2027–28 academic year.)	Redding, California	1921	C.M.A.	907	Red Hawks	1996
Stanton University	Anaheim, California	1996	Nonsectarian	379	Fighting Elks	2025
Westcliff University	Irvine, California	1993	For-profit	6,532	Warriors	2020

=== Affiliate members ===
The Cal Pac currently has 3 affiliate members, two of them are private schools:

Institution	Location	Founded	Affiliation	Enrollment	Nickname	Joined (Note: Represents the calendar year when fall sports competition begins.)	Cal Pac sport(s)	Primary conference
Dakota State University	Madison, South Dakota	1881	Public	3,842	Trojans	2026	women's soccer	Frontier
Fisher College	Boston, Massachusetts	1903	Nonsectarian	1,501	Falcons	2026	men's volleyball	Continental (CAC)
Walla Walla University	College Place, Washington	1892	Seventh-day; Adventist	1,397	Wolves	2025	men's volleyball	Cascade (CCC)

=== Former members ===
The Cal Pac had 22 former full members, all but four were private schools:

Institution	Location	Founded	Affiliation	Enrollment	Nickname	Joined (Note: Represents the calendar year when fall sports competition begins.)	Left (Note: Represents the calendar year when spring sports competition ends.)	Subsequent conference(s)	Current conference
University of Antelope Valley	Lancaster, California	2009	For-profit	N/A	Pioneers	2015	2024	Closed in 2024	
Benedictine University at Mesa	Mesa, Arizona	2013	Catholic (Benedictines)	340	Redhawks	2015	2024	Great Southwest (GSAC) (2025–present)	
Bethany University	Scotts Valley, California	1919	Assemblies of God	N/A	Bruins	1996	2011	Closed in 2011	
University of California, Merced	Merced, California	2005	Public (Note: Part of the University of California system.)	9,147	Golden Bobcats	2011	2025	California (CCAA) (Note: Currently an NCAA Division II athletic conference.) (2025–present)	
Cal Poly Maritime Academy	Vallejo, California	1929	Public (Note: Part of the California State University system.)	805	Keelhaulers	1996	2026	N/A (Note: Discontinued its athletics program, currently as a satellite campus of Cal Poly at San Luis Obispo.)	
California State University, East Bay	Hayward, California	1957	Public	13,333	Pioneers	1998	2009	California (CCAA) (2009–present)	
California State University, Monterey Bay	Seaside, California	1994	Public	6,742	Otters	1996	2004	California (CCAA) (2004–present)	
Dominican University	San Rafael, California	1890	Catholic (D.S.S.R.)	2,026	Penguins	1996	2009	Pacific West (PacWest) (2009–present)	
Embry–Riddle Aeronautical University–Prescott	Prescott, Arizona	1978	Nonsectarian	3,286	Eagles	2012	2024	Great Southwest (GSAC) (2024–present)	
Holy Names University	Oakland, California	1868	Catholic (S.N.J.M.)	N/A	Hawks	1996	2012	Pacific West (PacWest) (2012–23)	Closed in 2023
La Sierra University	Riverside, California	1922	Seventh-day; Adventist	1,611	Golden Eagles	2013	2025	Great Southwest (GSAC) (2025–present)	
Marymount California University (Note: Non-basketball member.)	Rancho Palos Verdes, California	1932	Catholic (R.S.H.M.)	N/A	Mariners	2012	2022	Closed in 2022	
Menlo College	Atherton, California	1927	Nonsectarian	840	Oaks	1996	2015	Great Southwest (GSAC) (2015–24)	California (CCAA) (2026–present)
Mills College (Note: This institution is a women's college, therefore it does not compete in men's sports.)	Oakland, California	1852	Nonsectarian	1,037	Cyclones	1999	2011	various (Note: Mills had joined the following subsequent conferences: as an NCAA D-III Independent from 2011–12 to 2012–13, and during the 2016–17 school year; the Great South Athletic Conference (GSAC) from 2013–14 to 2015–16; the American Collegiate Athletic Association (ACAA) from 2017–18 to 2019–20; and the Coast to Coast Athletic Conference (Note: Currently an NCAA Division III athletic conference.) (C2C) from 2020–21 to 2021–22.)	N/A (Note: Mills had discontinued its athletics program, as it was merged into Northeastern University (which has its own athletics program) in 2022.)
Notre Dame de Namur University	Belmont, California	1851	Catholic (SNDdeN)	237	Argonauts	1998	2006	Pacific West (PacWest) (2006–20)	N/A (Note: Notre Dame de Namur dropped its athletic program after the 2019–20 school year.)
Park University–Gilbert	Gilbert, Arizona	2018	Nonsectarian	300	Buccaneers	2020	2024	Great Southwest (GSAC) (2024–present)	
Patten University	Oakland, California	1944	For-profit	300	Lions	1996	2005	NAIA Independent (2005–12)	N/A (Note: Patten dropped its athletic program after the 2011–12 school year.)
Providence Christian College	Pasadena, California	2002	Reformed; Christian	147	Sea Beggars	2015	2025	Discontinued athletics in 2025	
University of Saint Katherine	San Marcos, California	2010	Eastern; Orthodox	N/A	Firebirds	2019	2024	Closed in 2024	
Sierra Nevada University	Incline Village, Nevada	1969	Nonsectarian	N/A	Eagles	2015	2022	N/A (Note: Sierra Nevada merged its campus into the University of Nevada, Reno in 2022.)	
Soka University of America	Aliso Viejo, California	2001	Nonsectarian	476	Lions	2012	2025	Great Southwest (GSAC) (2025–present)	
William Jessup University (Note: Currently known as Jessup University since January 23, 2023.)	Rocklin, California	1939	Nondenominational	1,484	Warriors	2004	2014	Great Southwest (GSAC) (2014–24)	Pacific West (PacWest) (2024–present)

=== Former affiliate members ===
The Cal Pac had one former affiliate member, a private school:

Institution	Location	Founded	Affiliation	Nickname	Joined (Note: Represents the calendar year when fall sports competition begins.)	Left (Note: Represents the calendar year when spring sports competition ends.)	Cal Pac sport(s)	Primary conference
Central Christian College of Kansas	McPherson, Kansas	1884	Free Methodist	Tigers	2025	2026	men's volleyball	Sooner (SAC)

=== Membership timeline ===
Full member (non-football)

== Sports sponsored ==
Conference sports
Sport	Men's	Women's
Baseball	✓	
Basketball	✓	✓
Cross Country	✓	✓
Golf	✓	✓
Soccer	✓	✓
Softball		✓
Volleyball	✓	✓

== See also ==
- Big West Conference, a conference that competes in Division I and that consisted entirely of California schools from 2005 to 2012
- California Collegiate Athletic Association, an all-California school conference that competes in Division II
- Golden State Athletic Conference (now known as the Great Southwest Athletic Conference), an NAIA conference that consisted entirely of California schools from its formation in 1986 until 2012.
