= Trinity Lutheran College =

Trinity Lutheran College may refer to:

- Trinity Lutheran College, Ashmore, Queensland, Australia
- Trinity Lutheran College, Everett, Washington, USA
