= King's College, Kathmandu =

Private business college in Kathmandu, Nepal

King's College
- किङ्स कलेज
- Motto: Architecting future
- Type: Private
- Established: 2003
- Affiliations: Westcliff University
- Director: Narottam Aryal
- Academic staff: 38
- Location: Babarmahal, Kathmandu, Bagmati Province, Nepal; 27.6890°N 85.3280°E
- Campus: Urban
- Language: English
- Website: www.kingscollege.edu.np

King's College (Nepali: किङ्स कलेज) is a private business school situated at Babarmahal, Kathmandu, Nepal. It is affiliated to Westcliff University, California.

== History ==
It was established as an A level institute in 2003. Later in 2009, the college extended other higher level studies as Bachelor of Business Administration (BBA) and Master's in Business Administration (MBA).

=== 2010–2015 ===
In 2014, the college received awards for third best business school of Nepal and second best graduate business school (MBA) of Nepal. The college took the affiliation of Westcliff University, California, an accredited American University in 2015.

=== Partnership with Yunus Social Business Center ===
In 2016, the college has entered into partnership with Yunus Center of Dhaka at the premise of Grameen Bank. The chief signatory were Director of King's College Narottam Aryal and Nobel Prize Winner Muhammad Yunus. The purpose of the partnership was to establish Yunus Social Business Center in Nepal by the King's College.

=== 2017–present ===
The college took part in KAF Corporate Quiz in 2017. On 7 July 2017, the college celebrated their first convocation with 130 MBA graduates and 76 BBA graduates. The program was attended by then Deputy Prime Minister and Education Minister Gopal Man Shrestha. In September 2017, the college had announced to host 16th International Entrepreneurship Forum (IEF) conference at Hotel Radisson. The theme of the program was Sustainable Entrepreneurship and Development and the partner in association was Essex Business School, London. On 27 February 2018, the college released first issue of International Journal of Entrepreneurship and Economic Issues at a program in Hotel Radisson. The in-house journal focused on developing strong research culture. In 2018, the college has organized second celebration programme called Hamro Utsav. The programme is focused on stock market challenge, social media marketing, business planning, human resources management and quiz shows. Additional programmes were mad aids, short movie, thematic photography, battle of bands, junk arts, college icon, dance competition, event planning, business exhibition, drawing competitions. In 2019, the college partnered up with Lufthansa Group in order to organize Impact Week Nepal 2019, where students from different colleges took part and created solutions for different problems in the locality using Design Thinking approach.

== Courses ==
The college offers Bachelor of Business Administration (BBA), Master's in Business Administration (MBA), MBA entrepreneurship, MBA in eBusiness and MBA for professionals (MBA pro).

== Notable alumni ==
Niti Shah Miss International 2017 Nepal- Currently pursuing education here

== See also ==
- Westcliff University
- Nepal Open University
- Kathmandu College of Management
