= Providence Christian College =

Private Christian liberal arts college in California

Coordinates: 34.149441°N 118.141045°W

- Seal of Providence Christian College
- Motto: In Christo Omnia Nova
- Motto in English: In Christ all things new
- Type: Private liberal arts college
- Active: 2002–2026
- Accreditation: WSCUC
- Religious affiliation: Reformed Christianity
- Undergraduates: 168 (fall 2024)
- Location: Pasadena, California, United States
- Campus: 17 acres (6.9 ha); Suburban
- Colors: Royal blue and orange
- Nickname: Sea Beggars
- Sporting affiliations: NAIA – Cal Pac
- Mascot: The Sea Beggar
- Website: www.providencecc.edu

Providence Christian College was a private Christian liberal arts college in Pasadena, California, United States. Founded in 2002 by the California Dutch, the institution identified with the confessionally Reformed tradition but maintained no formal denominational affiliation. The college offered a single academic program leading to a bachelor's degree in Liberal Studies. It closed in May 2026, as announced on February 9, 2026.

== History ==
On several occasions beginning in the 1960s, discussions were held about establishing a Reformed Christian college on the West Coast. In November 2001, a small group met in Chino, California to consider the feasibility of such an institution and unanimously agreed to pursue the creation of a four-year liberal arts college that would reflect a Reformed biblical perspective in all aspects of its academic and campus life.

The group also determined that the college should be governed by a self-perpetuating Board of Directors drawn from various Reformed and Presbyterian churches. Although the college has no formal denominational affiliation, it adheres to Presbyterian and Reformed confessional standards, including the Westminster Confession and Catechisms, the Belgic Confession, the Heidelberg Catechism, and the Canons of Dort.

Providence Christian College was incorporated in the state of California on November 12, 2002, and held its first board meeting on January 18, 2003. On January 1, 2004, the college took possession of a campus in Ontario, California, and began renovating its five principal buildings for use as classrooms, dormitories, a library, a dining hall, and administrative offices.

In August 2010, Providence relocated to Pasadena, California. The Providence Christian College library holds approximately 12,000 volumes and 100 periodical subscriptions, and provides students access to an additional 5,500 online periodicals—many in full text—along with 2,500 electronic books and 52 scholarly databases through online subscriptions.

The college then operated on the campus of the former William Carey International University, which it shared with the U.S. Center for World Mission. The 17.5-acre residential campus is located in the East Washington Village neighborhood on the north side of Pasadena, near the foothills of the San Gabriel Mountains and the Angeles National Forest. When William Carey International University began the process of selling the property in late 2018—ultimately transferring ownership to a for-profit private boarding school—Providence prepared for another move. In December 2018, the college relocated within the Los Angeles area to a church facility and adjoining offices in Old Town Pasadena, adjacent to Fuller Theological Seminary.

Providence closed at the end of the 2025-26 academic year, with the President citing factors including declining student enrollment, the rising cost of operations, heightened accreditation expectations, loss of federal funds, shifts in donor giving and financial circumstances.

== Accreditation ==
Providence Christian College was accredited by the WASC Senior College and University Commission (WSCUC). Its accreditation status is currently on probation.

In 2004, the college began the accreditation process and was granted permission to operate as a degree-granting institution in California on December 9, 2004, by the Bureau for Private Postsecondary and Vocational Education (BPPVE). Following this approval, Providence Christian College initiated the process of seeking eligibility with the Western Association of Schools and Colleges (WASC). The college is also a member of the International Association for the Promotion of Christian Higher Education (IAPCHE).

== Facilities ==
The primary building of the new campus in Old Town Pasadena was Witherspoon Hall. Originally built in 1928, the building served as the First Congregational Church of Pasadena (UCC) until the church sold the property in February 2018. Providence Christian College moved into the building in January 2019. Witherspoon Hall served as the college's chapel, classroom space, and library.

The Pasadena New School of Cooking and the refectory of Fuller Theological Seminary, both located several blocks away, served as the college's cafeteria and food-service providers. Providence Christian College also maintained student housing at Providence Village, a set of apartment buildings on Oakland Avenue north of Walnut Street.
