= University of Saint Katherine =

Private college in San Marcos, California

- Former names: Saint Katherine College
- Motto: Inquiry Seeking Wisdom
- Type: Private college
- Active: 2010–2024
- Religious affiliation: Eastern Orthodox Christianity
- President: Frank J. Papatheofanis
- Students: 232 (Fall 2022)
- Location: San Marcos, California, United States; 33.1383015°N 117.1628937°W
- Campus: Large suburban
- Colors: Maroon & Sandstone
- Nickname: Firebirds
- Sporting affiliations: NAIA – Cal Pac
- Website: www.usk.edu

The University of Saint Katherine (USK) was a private Eastern Orthodox college in San Marcos, California. Founded in 2011 as Saint Katherine College, USK taught liberal arts and sciences in more than 25 fields of study. It changed its name to final namesake in November 2016, when it added graduate studies. The institution announced its closure in April 2024, filing for bankruptcy following financial shortfalls. The winddown of operations was expected to be completed by July 31, 2024.

== History ==
The University of Saint Katherine (USK) was founded by Frank J. Papatheofanis and incorporated on June 30, 2010, as a California not-for-profit public benefit corporation. The California Bureau for Private and Post-Secondary Education (BPPE) approved the institution for operations in 2011. It was originally located in Encinitas, California from 2010 to 2014, and moved to San Marcos, California in August 2014.

It was accredited by the Western Association of Schools and Colleges in 2016.

=== Closure ===
On April 25, 2024, university president and founder Frank Papatheofanis announced that the university would close at the end of the spring semester on May 18, citing a "steep shortfall in operating cash" as the reason for the closure.

NBC News 7 in San Diego noted that, in contrast to the stated timeline, the university was closing immediately with staff directed to pick up their final checks the following day. They also reported that Papatheofanis said that the athletics programs were responsible for the institution being "significantly over budget".

Final exams in the Spring 2024 semester were canceled because of the closure.

== Academics ==
The University of Saint Katherine (USK) taught liberal arts and sciences and offered undergraduate and graduate degree programs, initially with a focus on liberal arts from an Orthodox Christian perspective. The institution offered baccalaureate degrees in liberal arts and sciences. In 2020, it began to offer a Master of Arts in Organizational Leadership. In 2022, a Master of Science in kinesiology and an online Master of Arts in Orthodox Theology were added.

The university hosted a chapter of Omicron Delta Kappa national honor society. A university graduate became its first Fulbright Award recipient in 2020. The university published the Saint Katherine Review, which was a journal of fiction, non-fiction and poetry from 2011 to 2018.

== Athletics ==
The Saint Katherine (USK) athletic teams were the Firebirds. The university was admitted as a member of the National Association of Intercollegiate Athletics (NAIA), primarily competing in the California Pacific Conference (Cal Pac) since the 2019–20 academic year.

The institution relied on student athletes to build enrollment. In 2012, the university emphasized a focus on athletics, admitting more than 90 student athletes. About 85% of students were playing on a USK sports team during 2022–23 season.
