= Trinity Lutheran College (Washington) =

Private college in Everett, Washington

Coordinates: 47°58′49″N 122°12′27″W

- Former name: Lutheran Bible Institute of Seattle (LBI)
- Motto: Intellectual, Faithful, Engaged
- Type: Private
- Active: 1944–2016
- Religious affiliation: Lutheran
- Dean: Michael W. DeLashmutt
- Executive director: Jim Lindus
- Undergraduates: 166
- Location: Everett, Washington, United States
- Campus: Urban
- Colors: Blue and Yellow
- Mascot: Eagle
- Website: www.tlc.edu

Trinity Lutheran College was a private Christian liberal arts college in Everett, Washington, United States. It offered bachelor's degrees, associate degrees and 1-year certificates. The college ceased instruction in 2016.

== History ==
Lutheran Bible Institute of Seattle (LBI) was founded in 1944 as an extension of the Lutheran Bible Institute based in Minneapolis and became independent in 1959. The college initially provided a biblical studies education and enrichment courses and, in the 1970s, began to add bachelor's degree programs in biblical studies, global missions, Christian education and youth ministry.

LBI initially operated from Gethsemane Lutheran Church in downtown Seattle. Growing enrollment led to a move to a new campus on Seattle's Greenwood Avenue in 1949. In 1979, after a decade of sustained enrollment growth, the college purchased the former Providence Heights College campus in Issaquah, Washington, from the Sisters of Providence, with staff and students moving to the new campus mid-school year. Shortly thereafter, LBI sold a significant portion of the unused property on the south side of the school to a developer. LBI played a key role in the development of this property, transforming it into a thriving retirement community presently known as Providence Point in honor of the previous school.

In 1982, LBI became regionally accredited by the Northwest Association of Schools and Colleges (now Northwest Commission on Colleges and Universities). LBI changed its name to Trinity Lutheran College in 1999 to reflect its status as an accredited four-year college. Trinity began to add new majors, including music and worship, early childhood education, business management, psychology and communications. Enrollment began to decline in the 1990s and, faced with financial uncertainty, the college decided to sell the Providence Heights campus and to relocate again, moving to downtown Everett, in fall 2008.

The campus center in Everett was located at 2802 Wetmore Avenue, at the corner of California Street and Wetmore Avenue. It had six floors devoted to classrooms, administrative offices, faculty offices, the library, a student store and a commons area. A chapel and additional classroom space was added in 2014. The center had a parking garage connected via a skywalk. Student housing was provided in a nearby apartment complex and the YMCA, adjacent to the campus center, was available for student recreation use.

=== 2016 closure ===
On January 12, 2016, chair of the college's board of directors, Rev. Dr. Kevin Bates, published an open letter expressing a plan to end operation of the college. Academic instruction ceased on May 7, 2016, with more than 70 students receiving degrees at the final commencement ceremony. After the closure, the campus center was sold to Funko as its new corporate headquarters.

The college's supporting organization, the Trinity Education Foundation, still exists, providing scholarship support to students attending private Christian colleges in the Pacific Northwest.

== Athletics ==
The Trinity Lutheran athletic teams were called the Eagles. The college was a member of the National Association of Intercollegiate Athletics (NAIA), primarily competing as an NAIA Independent within the Association of Independent Institutions (AII) under associate/provisional status from 2014–15 to 2015–16. It was also a member of the National Christian College Athletic Association (NCCAA), primarily competing as an independent in the West Region of the Division I level.

Trinity Lutheran competed in ten intercollegiate varsity sports. Men's sports included cross country, golf, soccer, swimming and track and field. Women's sports included cross country, golf, soccer, swimming and track and field. Other sports included men's and women's tennis.
