= Marymount California University =

Former Catholic university in Rancho Palos Verdes, California, US

Coordinates: 33.735217°N 118.333783°W

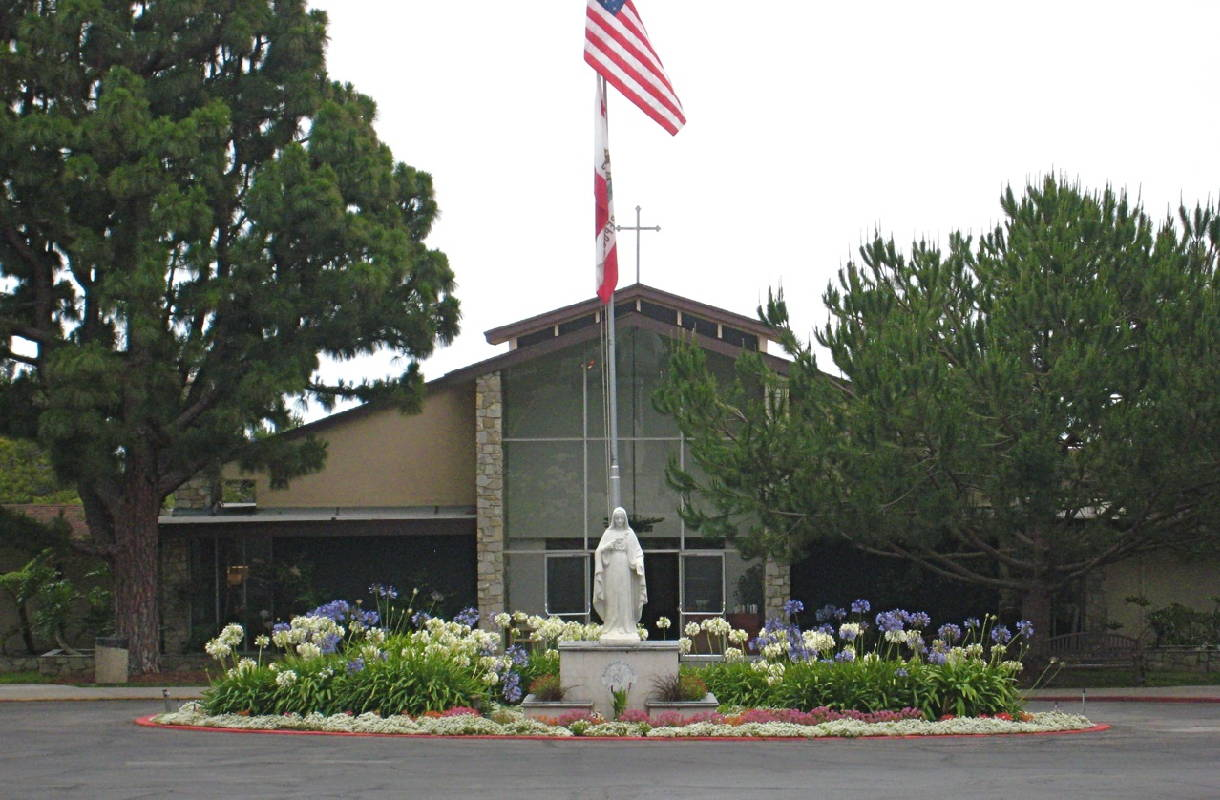
- Entrance to the campus
- Motto: Tua Luce Dirige
- Motto in English: Direct Us by Thy Light
- Type: Private university
- Active: 1932–August 1, 2022
- Religious affiliation: Roman Catholic (Religious of the Sacred Heart of Mary)
- President: Brian Marcotte
- Location: Rancho Palos Verdes, California, United States
- Campus: Suburban, 26 acres (11 ha)
- Colors: Blue & white
- Nickname: Mariners
- Website: www.marymountcalifornia.edu

Marymount California University was a private Catholic university in Rancho Palos Verdes, California, United States. Originally founded by the Religious of the Sacred Heart of Mary (RHSM), the institution was accredited by the WASC Senior College and University Commission. The university closed in August 2022.

== History ==
The college was established in 1932, by the Religious of the Sacred Heart of Mary, on Sunset Boulevard in Westwood. It began as a liberal arts college for women and was the first Catholic junior college in California. In 1947, it received accreditation as a four-year college. In 1960, a new campus was started on Palos Verdes Peninsula that included dormitories for on-campus residential living, an auditorium, dining facility, a library, and a chapel. The college’s preparation for a merger with Loyola University of Los Angeles in Westchester, was started in 1967. It separated its two-year and four-year programs. The two-year programs remained on the Rancho Palos Verdes campus and received accreditation, in 1971. In 1968, the four-year college moved to the Loyola campus. The merger was finalized in 1973, and became a new entity - Loyola Marymount University. In 1975, Marymount College moved to its present site. The Weekend College Program was added, in 1983. Accredited by the Western Association of Schools and Colleges, the college offered degrees in both Associate in Arts and Associate in Science.

Marymount California University was established in 1968 by the RHSM as Marymount Palos Verdes College (it was split from the original Marymount College in Westwood, Los Angeles and later merged with St. Joseph's College and then Loyola University to form Loyola Marymount University). At the time, the college was a two-year institution of higher education. In 1975, responsibility for the college was transferred to a lay board of trustees. In 1986, the college changed its name from Marymount Palos Verdes College to Marymount College, Palos Verdes. In summer 2011, Marymount opened its Waterfront Campus in downtown San Pedro, Los Angeles. In spring 2013, Marymount changed its name from Marymount College to Marymount California University to reflect "an ongoing transformation of the 45-year-old institution of higher education to a multi-campus institution offering undergraduate and graduate degree programs." In fall 2013, Marymount opened its Lakeside Campus in the community of Lucerne in rural Lake County, California. In March 2016 the WASC Senior College and University Commission questioned the viability of a Northern California campus and it closed in 2017.

In February 2018, the university appointed trustee Brian Marcotte its new president. The sudden departure of the previous president was not fully explained.

The university announced plans in July 2021 to merge with Saint Leo University, another private Catholic university. The transition was expected to be completed by January 2023. Plans for the merger fell through and Marymount California University closed in August 2022. The Rancho Palos Verdes campus and the residential site in San Pedro were purchased by the University of California, Los Angeles for $80 million.

== Campuses ==
The Oceanview Campus encompasses 26 acres (11 ha) overlooking the Pacific Ocean and Catalina Island in Rancho Palos Verdes.

Residential Community included The Villas located in adjacent San Pedro, a community of fully furnished, two-story townhomes that could accommodate 400 students and staff. The center of the community had a swimming pool, fitness center, outdoor covered pavilion, beach volleyball court, basketball court and an outdoor kitchen.

== Athletics ==
The Marymount athletic teams were called the Mariners. The university was a member of the National Association of Intercollegiate Athletics (NAIA), primarily competing in the California Pacific Conference (CalPac) from 2012–13 to 2021–22. The Mariners previously competed as an NAIA Independent within the Association of Independent Institutions (AII) from 2010–11 to 2011–12.

Marymount competed in 16 intercollegiate varsity sports: men's sports included baseball, cross country, golf, soccer, softball, tennis and track & field, while women's sports included cross country, golf, soccer, softball, tennis, track & field, volleyball and beach volleyball; and co-ed sports included eSports and surfing.
