= Embry–Riddle Aeronautical University, Prescott =

Private aeronautical university in Prescott, Arizona, U.S.

Coordinates: 34.61449°N 112.44597°W

Embry-Riddle Aeronautical University, Prescott Campus
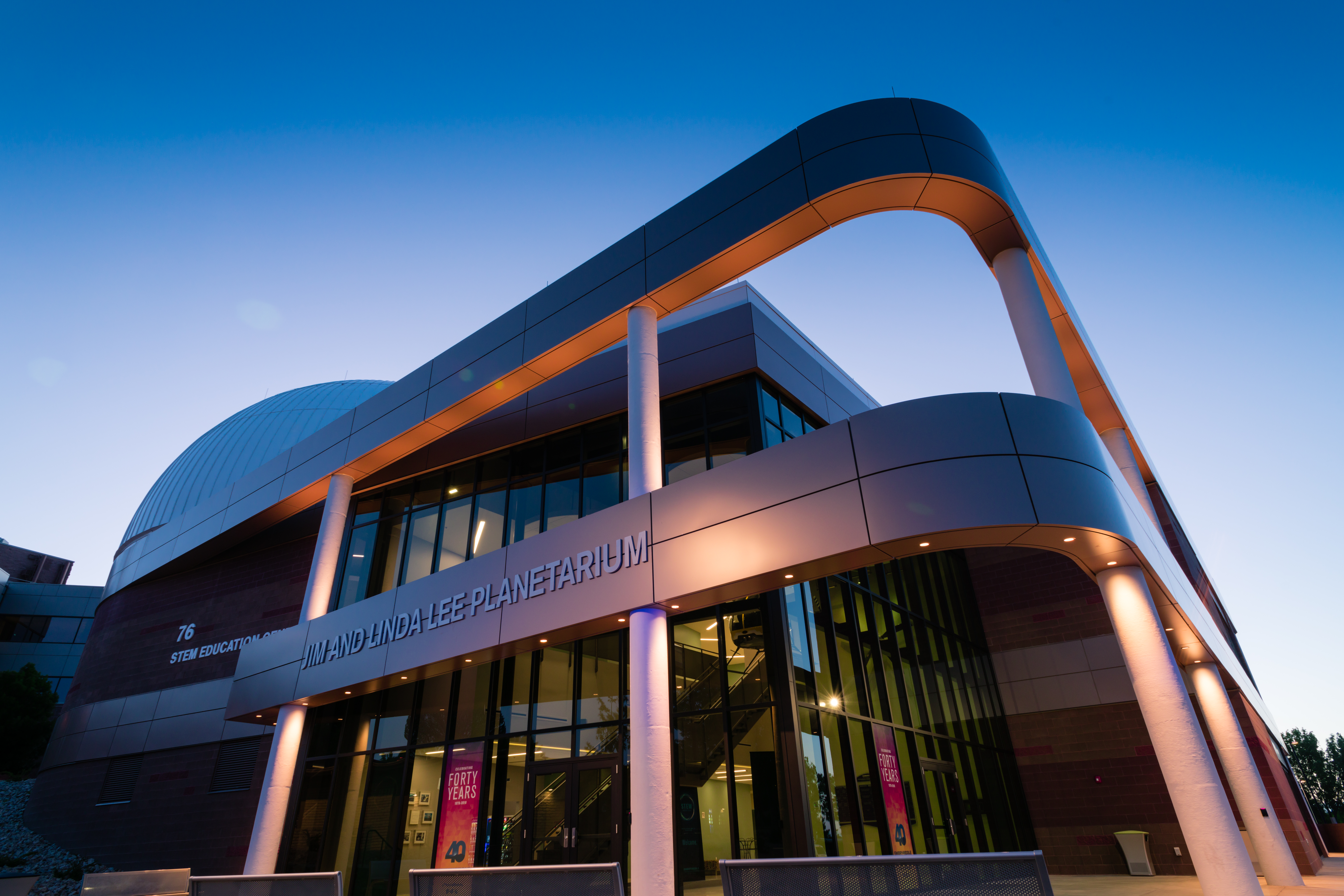
- STEM Center and Jim & Linda Lee Planetarium
- Established: 1978; 48 years ago
- Chancellor: Dr. Ken Witcher
- Undergraduates: 3,250
- Postgraduates: 36
- Location: Prescott, Arizona, U.S.
- Campus: 539 acres (218 ha); Rural
- Colors: Blue, Yellow & Gold
- Nickname: Eagles
- Sporting affiliations: NAIA – GSAC
- Mascot: Ernie the Eagle
- Website: prescott.erau.edu
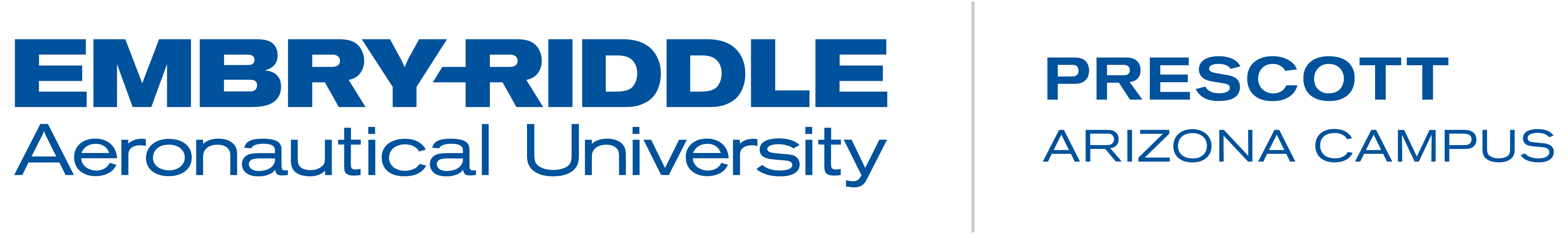

Embry-Riddle Aeronautical University, Prescott is a residential campus of Embry-Riddle Aeronautical University in Prescott, Arizona, United States. The university offers bachelor of science degrees in applied science, aviation, business, computers & technology, engineering, security, intelligence & safety, and space. The Prescott campus also offers master's degrees in Safety Science and Cyber Intelligence & Security.

== History ==
Embry-Riddle began in 1925 as the Embry-Riddle Company, an aircraft dealer and airmail provider founded by Talton Higbee Embry and John Paul Riddle in Cincinnati, Ohio. Embry-Riddle was eventually incorporated into what is now American Airlines, before reforming during the buildup to World War II in Miami, Florida, as the Embry-Riddle School of Aviation, and later, the Embry-Riddle Aeronautical Institute. Embry-Riddle moved to Daytona Beach, Florida, in 1965 and was renamed Embry-Riddle Aeronautical University in 1970.

Embry-Riddle opened its second campus in Prescott, Arizona, in 1978. Embry-Riddle purchased the former campus of Prescott College, which closed abruptly in 1974 from financial hardship.

== Campus ==
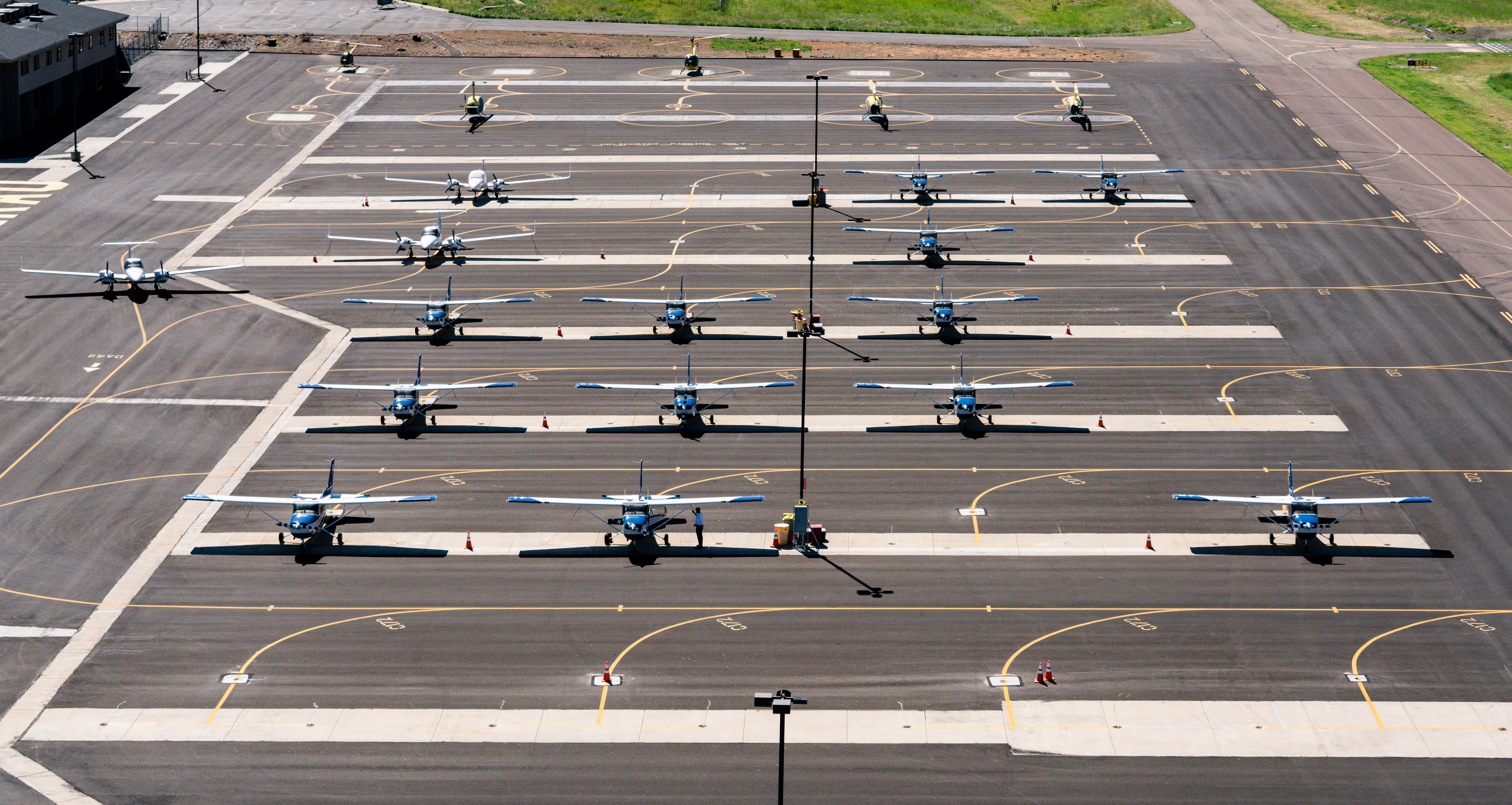
Embry-Riddle Prescott's Flight Line

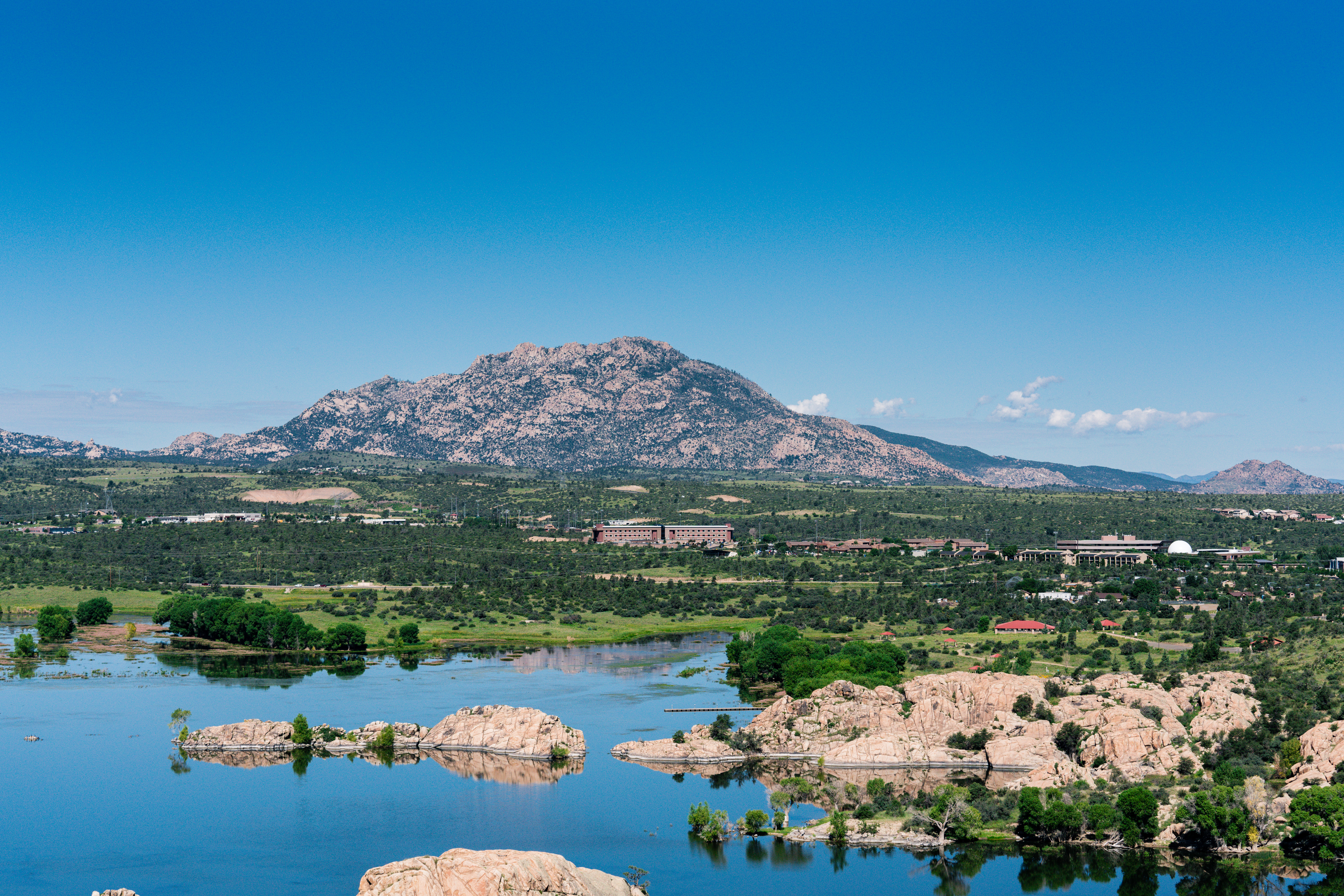
The campus rests between Willow Lake and Granite Mountain

The 539-acre (2.18 km^{2}) campus is located among Arizona's Bradshaw Mountain Range approximately three miles (4.8 km) from Prescott's airport, Ernest A. Love Field. All campus life is centered in a one mile (1.6 km) area. The university's campus in Prescott, Arizona is 100 miles (160 km) north of Phoenix. The campus has an enrollment of about 3,200 students and is covered in north western terrain.

=== Academic buildings ===
The Aerospace Experimentation and Fabrication Building (AXFAB) holds a fabrication suite with a machine shop and two connected fabrication areas for senior design projects. The Material Science Lab and Materials Testing Lab are also housed in AXFAB, along with the Structures Lab and the Structural Dynamics Lab. The Space Systems lab houses a satellite ground station which operates on amateur radio bands as well as equipment to allow students to simulate attitude control of satellites. The Composites Lab enables students to fabricate composite parts and the Rapid Prototyping Lab contains stereo-lithography printers for student use.

The King Engineering and Technology Center is where most of the electrical engineering and computer engineering classes occur. This building contains a design suite for autonomous vehicles and freshman engineering lab which allow students to build robots, lighter-than-air vehicles, and more. The control theory lab, digital circuits lab, and linear circuits lab all give students the hands-on experience in electronics. The power lab lets students design, fabricate, and test power electronics, and the senior design suite is a place for students to work on their capstone projects.

The Tracy Doryland Wind Tunnel Laboratory contains an aerodynamics laboratory with four wind tunnels for undergraduate students' use. The thermal/fluid laboratory contains a water tunnel to demonstrate fluid flow. The propulsion lab has a micro-turbojet which is used to study advanced propulsion.

The STEM Education Center and the Jim and Linda Lee Planetarium is used as a community outreach tool that is used by students as well as local middle and high school students in order to promote STEM related education.

Academic Complex I (AC1) houses faculty offices, computer and meteorology labs, two lecture halls and a number of classrooms.

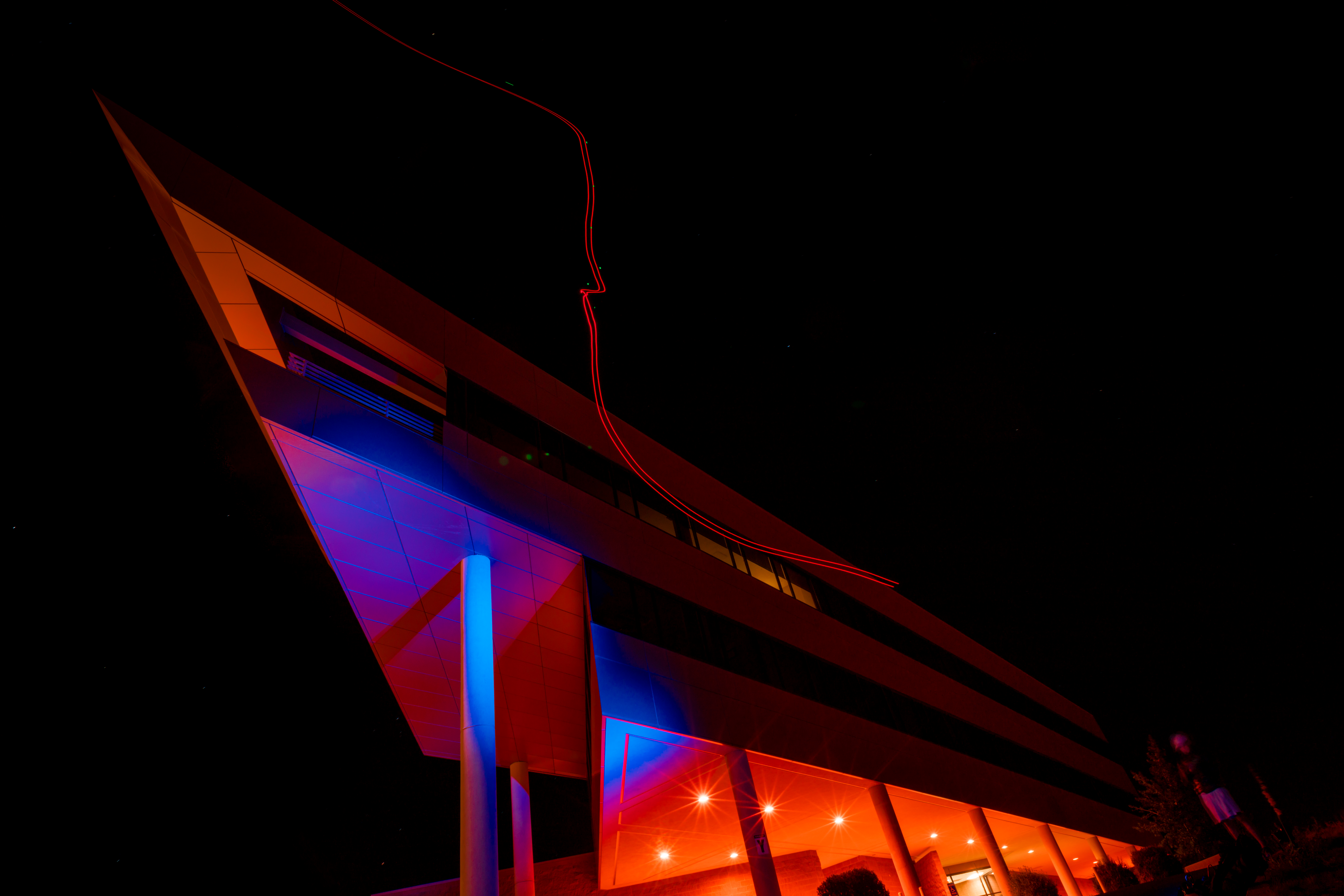
Academic Complex 1 (AC1)

The Christine & Stephen F. Udvar-Hazy Library and Learning Center is used as a community information and research hub.

The Robertson Aviation Safety Center II (RASCII) houses the Aviation Safety & Security Archives (ASASA) where the Robertson papers and other crash investigators' papers are housed as well as the state of the art ERGO Lab where students research the ergonomics of the human body.

The Robertson Aviation Safety Center (RASC I) houses an accident investigation lab, which provides students very comprehensive hands on undergraduate, minor, and graduate work.

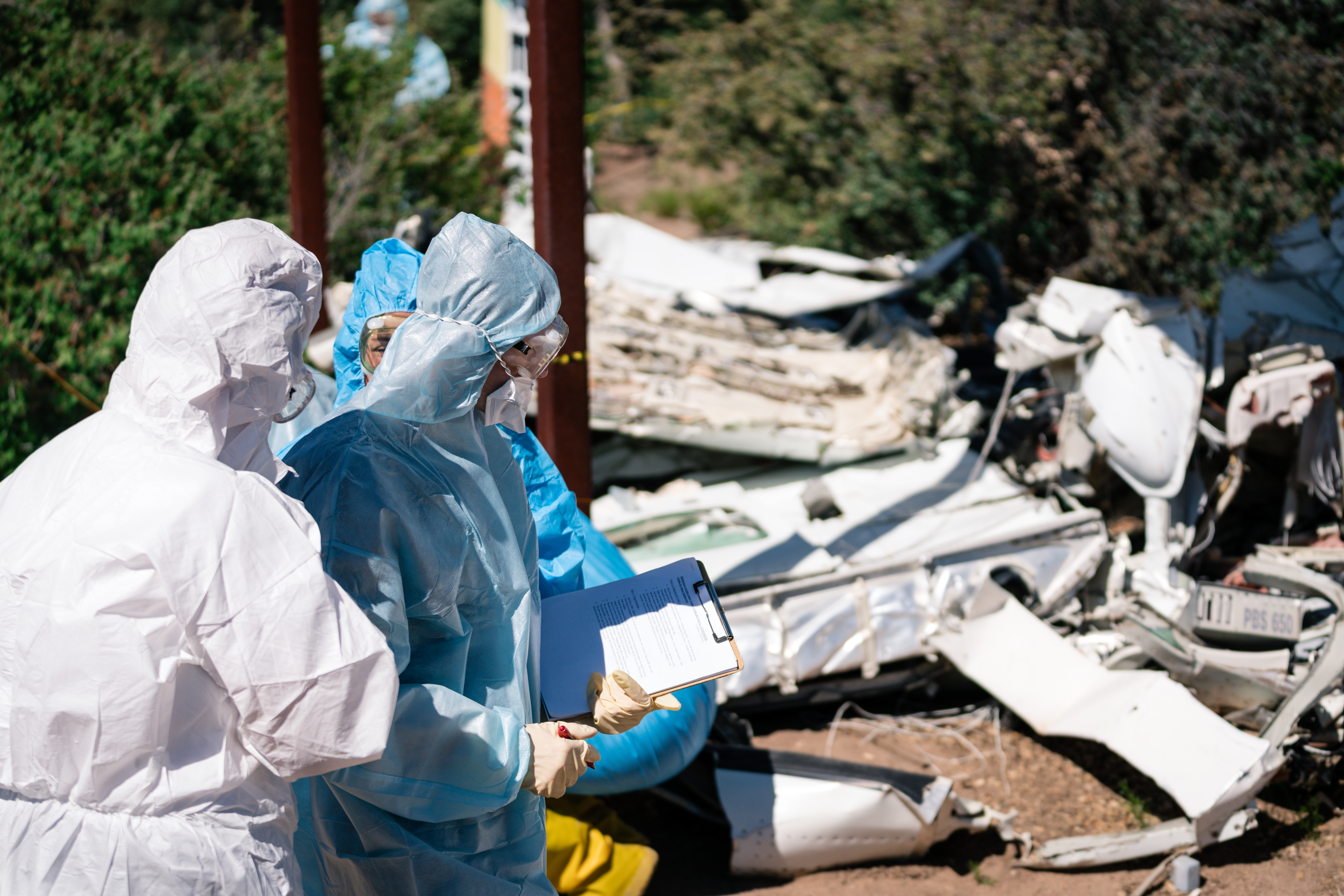
Robertson Safety Center Crash Lab

The Observatory is the recourse for Space Physics students, as well as the very active and diverse astronomy community that resides in Prescott, Arizona.

The Glen A. Doherty Center for Security and Intelligence Studies houses the College of Business, Security & Intelligence, including the Cyber Lab and Global Security Operations Center situation room.

The Davis Learning Center has a large auditorium that can be used for various events, as well as many smaller classrooms outlining the structure.

=== Residences ===
There are five housing communities on campus:

- Mingus Mountain Complex (Halls 1–5) [Freshmen Housing]
- Thumb Butte Complex Apartments [T1]
- Thumb Butte Complex Modulars [M100–M400]
- Thumb Butte Complex Suites [T2] [Freshmen Housing]
- Village Complex Apartments/Suites (Halls 6–10) [The Village]

== Academics ==
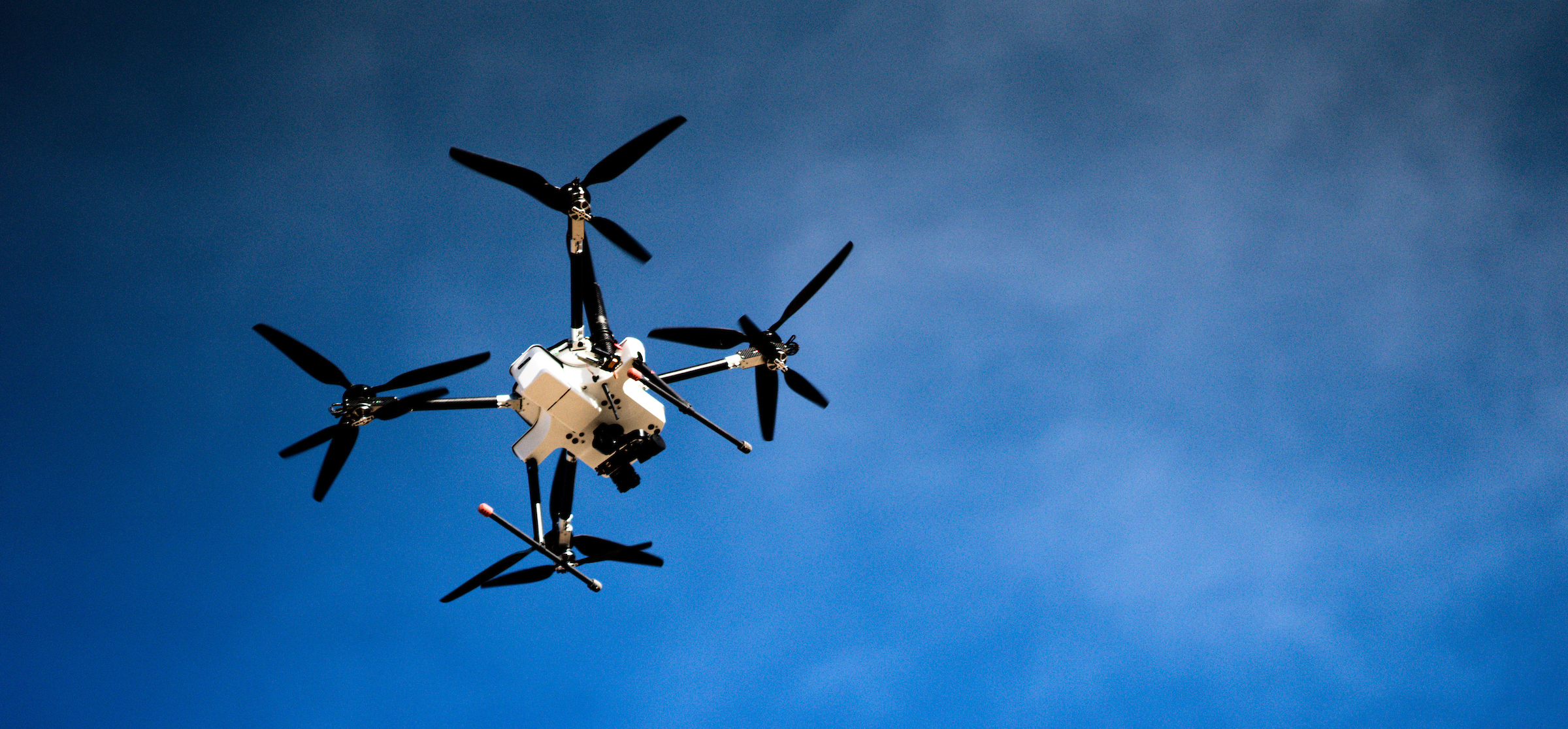
Drone in flight

Academics at the Prescott campus are organized into four colleges:

- College of Arts and Sciences
- College of Aviation
- College of Engineering
- College of Business, Security and Intelligence

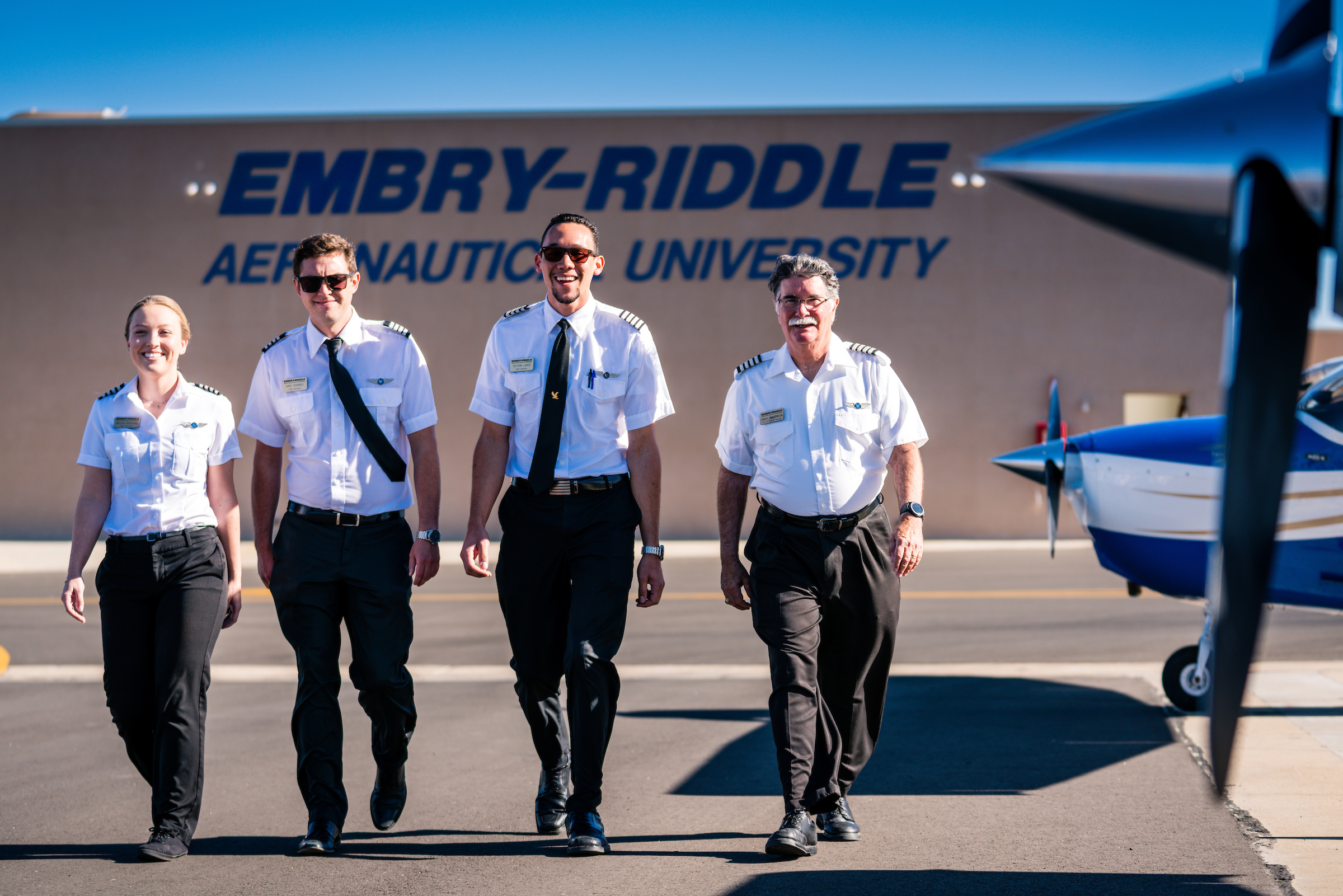
Student pilots on the Flight Line

The programs in aeronautics, air traffic management, applied meteorology, and aerospace studies are certified by the Federal Aviation Administration (FAA).

Embry-Riddle Prescott’s College of Business, Security and Intelligence offers degree programs focused on business and global issues such as terrorism, information warfare, transportation security, illicit trafficking networks, corporate security, population dislocations, natural disasters, widespread epidemics, cyber security and international crime and homeland security.

== Student body ==
Embry-Riddle's total fall 2023 undergraduate enrollment at the Prescott campus was 3,250 students, 28% of which were female. International students make up 8.5% of the Prescott campus's undergraduate enrollment.

A student-operated newspaper, Horizons, publishes every two weeks during the school year. There are over 150 student clubs and organizations, including fraternities and sororities, service clubs, academic clubs, athletic clubs and special interest/activities clubs.

The Prescott campus is home to the Golden Eagles Flight Team, which competes in the National Intercollegiate Flying Association. Prescott's Golden Eagles Flight Team has won the regional championship each year for the past 39 years, and the team is also fifteen-time National Champions winning in 1993, 1997, 1999, 2003, 2005, 2007, 2008, 2012, 2013, 2016, 2017, 2018, 2021, 2022, 2023 and 2025. With their sixteen national wins, the team has also been inducted into the San Diego Air & Space Museum's Hall of Fame.

== Athletics ==
The athletic teams of Embry-Riddle's Prescott campus are called the Eagles. The university is a member of the National Association of Intercollegiate Athletics (NAIA), primarily competing in the Great Southwest Athletic Conference (GSAC; formerly the Golden State Athletic Conference until after the 2023–24 school year) since the 2024–25 academic year. The Eagles previously competed in the California Pacific Conference (Cal Pac) from 2012–13 to 2023–24.

Embry-Riddle Prescott competes in 14 intercollegiate varsity sports: men's sports include baseball, basketball, cross country, golf, soccer, track & field (outdoor only) and wrestling; women's sports include basketball, cross country, golf, soccer, softball, track & field (outdoor only) and volleyball.

=== Club sports ===
Club sport teams include baseball, rugby, dance team, archery, golf, indoor soccer, lacrosse, ultimate, softball and ice hockey.

=== Facilities ===
Athletic facilities on campus include indoor volleyball and basketball courts, a fitness center, a training room with a whirlpool, a multi-purpose gym, and a matted room for wrestling, aerobics, and martial arts. Other facilities include a softball field, baseball field, intercollegiate soccer field, tennis courts, sand volleyball courts, a 25-yard outdoor swimming pool, racquetball courts, a running track and a multi-sport recreation field.

== See also ==
- Embry-Riddle Aeronautical University
- Embry-Riddle Aeronautical University, Daytona Beach
- List of Embry-Riddle Aeronautical University alumni
- List of aerospace engineering schools
