= Central Christian College of Kansas =

Christian college in McPherson, Kansas, U.S.

Coordinates: 38°21′27″N 97°40′03″W

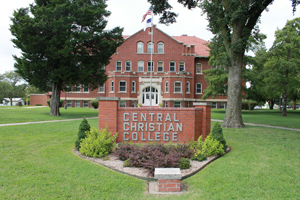
- Central Christian College of Kansas, 2017
- Other name: Central
- Former names: Orleans Seminary (1884–1914); Central Academy and College (1914–1940); Central College (1940–1950s); Central College of the Free Methodist Church (1950s–1999)
- Motto: Christ-Centered Education for Character
- Type: Private college
- Established: 1884
- Accreditation: Higher Learning Commission
- Religious affiliation: Free Methodist Church
- President: Dr. Leonard Favara
- Chief academic officer: Dr. Lara Vanderhoof
- Location: McPherson, Kansas, U.S.
- Colors: Blue & Gold
- Nickname: Tigers
- Sporting affiliations: NAIA – SAC; NCCAA Division I – Central
- Mascot: Tigers
- Website: www.centralchristian.edu

Central Christian College of Kansas is a private Christian college in McPherson, Kansas, United States. Central Christian is affiliated with the Free Methodist Church.

== Athletics ==
The Central Christian athletic teams are called the Tigers. The college is a member of the National Association of Intercollegiate Athletics (NAIA), primarily competing in the Sooner Athletic Conference (SAC) since the 2017–18 academic year. They are also a member of the National Christian College Athletic Association (NCCAA), primarily competing as an independent in the Central Region of the Division I level. The Tigers previously competed as an NAIA Independent within the Association of Independent Institutions (AII) from 2015–16 to 2016–17; and in the defunct Midlands Collegiate Athletic Conference (MCAC) from 2002–03 to 2014–15 (when the conference dissolved).

Central Christian competes in 16 intercollegiate varsity sports: Men's sports include baseball, basketball, cross country, golf, soccer, volleyball and wrestling; while women's sports include basketball, cross country, golf, soccer, softball, volleyball and wrestling; and co-ed sports include cheerleading and eSports.
