= Westcliff University =

For-profit university in Irvine, California

- Type: Private for-profit university
- Established: 1993
- Accreditation: WSCUC
- Academic affiliations: Western State College of Law
- President: Eric Anderson
- Students: 7,190
- Location: Irvine, California, U.S. 33°41′08″N 117°50′53″W
- Campus: 24 acres (9.7 ha)
- Colors: Navy Blue, Royal Blue & Gold
- Nickname: Warriors
- Sporting affiliations: NAIA – Cal Pac
- Website: www.westcliff.edu

Westcliff University (WU) is a private, for-profit university in Irvine, California. Founded in 1993, it offers bachelor's, master's, and doctorate degrees, as well as certificate programs and continuing education courses.

== History ==
Westcliff University was founded in 1993 with a focus on online education in the fields of business and education.

In 2019, Westcliff University acquired Western State College of Law, further expanding its educational offerings in legal education.

== Campus ==
Westcliff University relocated in 2020 to the Intersect Campus in Irvine, California. The site includes a main academic building with classrooms, faculty offices, administrative services, and study areas, as well as a multipurpose venue for athletics, recreation, career fairs, and other events.

In addition to its main campus in Irvine, Westcliff operates additional campuses across North America: Corona (site of its simulation‑lab enabled nursing programs), Dallas, Los Angeles (Santa Monica), Miami, Orlando, and San Francisco. The university also opened its first international campus in Toronto, Ontario, Canada, which offers a Master of Information Systems & Technology (MIST) program.

== Academics ==
The university offers online and hybrid programs focused on business, IT, and education fields. Programs include one-year certificates, bachelor's degrees, post-baccalaureate certificates, master's degrees, and doctoral degrees. The university is accredited by the WASC Senior College and University Commission (WSCUC), Distance Education Accrediting Commission (DEAC), and Accreditation Council for Business Schools and Programs (ACBSP). It is also approved by California's Bureau for Private Postsecondary Education (BPPE).

=== Colleges and schools ===
Westcliff University offers 20+ areas of study and confers degrees from five colleges. The university is classified as a Special Focus Four-Year: Business & Management School. The university has a 10-to-1 student-faculty ratio and offers bachelor's, master's and doctorate degrees through its four colleges and one law school:

- College of Business
- College of Education
- College of Technology & Engineering
- College of Nursing
- Western State College of Law

=== Enrollment ===
In fall 2024, the university reported 7,190 students. Among those students, 1,817 were first-time undergraduate students and 144 were undergraduate transfer students. Nearly all (95%) of those students were enrolled full-time; over half of them (58%) came from outside the United States and 36% of the domestic students came from states other than California. Westcliff University's retention rate for first-time bachelor's degree-seeking students was 75%, comparable to the national average of 76%.

The university enrolled 3,808 graduate students. Most (83%) were enrolled in in-person courses.

=== Local philanthropy ===
Westcliff University established the Social Responsibility Committee in 2022 to collaborate with local nonprofits. According to a 2023 Companies That Care special report by the Orange County Business Journal, the university's impact more than doubled in 2023, with donations reaching $68,843 and volunteer hours exceeding 5,188 compared to $17,000 and 634 hours in 2022. Westcliff also awarded $2,885,916.12 in scholarships.

The university collaborates with the Inclusive Sports Foundation, local schools, and community organizations to host an annual Inclusive Sports Day. This event brings together student-athletes and children for athletic activities, dance, and other interactive programming, with an emphasis on inclusion and engagement.

Westcliff also partners with Unlimited Possibilities to support the iCan Bike Camp, which helps individuals with disabilities learn to ride bicycles using adaptive equipment and volunteer assistance.

=== Military and veterans ===
Westcliff University is designated as a Military Friendly School, offering programs to support veterans and active-duty service members (e.g., Yellow Ribbon Program, credit for military training, and dedicated support point of contact). The university is a member of the Department of Defense Voluntary Educational Partnership Memorandum of Understanding.

== Athletics ==
The Westcliff athletic teams are called the Warriors. The university competed as an independent program until 2020, when it joined the National Association of Intercollegiate Athletics (NAIA) and the California Pacific Conference (Cal Pac) in March of that year, effective beginning the 2020–21 school year.

Westcliff competes in a variety of intercollegiate varsity sports. Men's sports include baseball, basketball, volleyball, soccer, wrestling, surf and water polo, while women's sports include softball, basketball, volleyball, soccer, wrestling, cheer and surf. Westcliff Athletics also offers an academy team (developmental program) for another 11 teams.

For the 2023–24 season, Westcliff University's Athletics Department was awarded the NAIA Champions of Character 5-Star Institution Gold Status for the first time. The department had previously been awarded Bronze status during the 2021–2022 season.

== See also ==
- Western State College of Law
- King's College, Kathmandu
