= Lena Beatrice Morton =

American educator and literary scholar

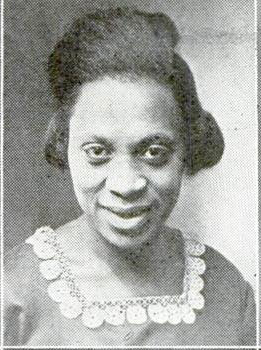
Lena Beatrice Morton, from a 1922 publication.

Lena Beatrice Morton (1901 – January 10, 1981) was an American educator and literary scholar.

== Early life ==
Lena Beatrice Morton was born in Flat Creek in Bath County, Kentucky, the daughter of Susie Morton and William Morton. Her family moved to Ohio so that she could attend secondary school. She attended the University of Cincinnati, where she was a founding member of the school's first black sorority. She graduated in 1922. She completed doctoral studies in the English department at Case Western Reserve University in 1947.

== Career ==
Lena Beatrice Morton taught high school and college-level English courses. She was head of the humanities division at Texas College, where she held the Minnie Stevens Piper Foundation Chair. She was a life fellow of the International Institute of Arts and Letters in Switzerland. She also taught at Lane College in Tennessee, and at Langston University in Oklahoma.

Books by Lena Beatrice Morton include Negro Poetry in America (1925), Farewell to the Public Schools, I'm Glad We Met: A Handbook for Teachers (1952), Man Under Stress (1960), Patterns of Language Usage, My First Sixty Years: Passion for Wisdom (1965), and The Influence of the Sea Upon English Poetry from the Anglo-Saxon to the Victorian Period (1976).

== Personal life ==
Lena Beatrice Morton died in 1981, aged 79 years.

Her memoir was one of six considered in Stephanie Y. Evans's Black Women in the Ivory Tower, 1850-1954: An Intellectual History (2007).
