= Haygood Seminary =

Seminary in Arkansas, United States

- Type: Private black seminary
- Active: March 1883–1927
- Religious affiliation: Colored Methodist Episcopal Church
- Location: Washington, Arkansas, United States

Haygood Seminary, also known as Haygood Academy, was a seminary near Washington, Arkansas, United States. It was established by the Colored Methodist Episcopal Church (CME Church, now Christian Methodist Episcopal Church) to train African Americans in Arkansas for a career in the clergy. It was one of the first such institutions established by the CME Church. In 1927, the school relocated to Jefferson County, Arkansas, where it operated as Arkansas-Haygood Industrial College before closing during World War II.

== History ==
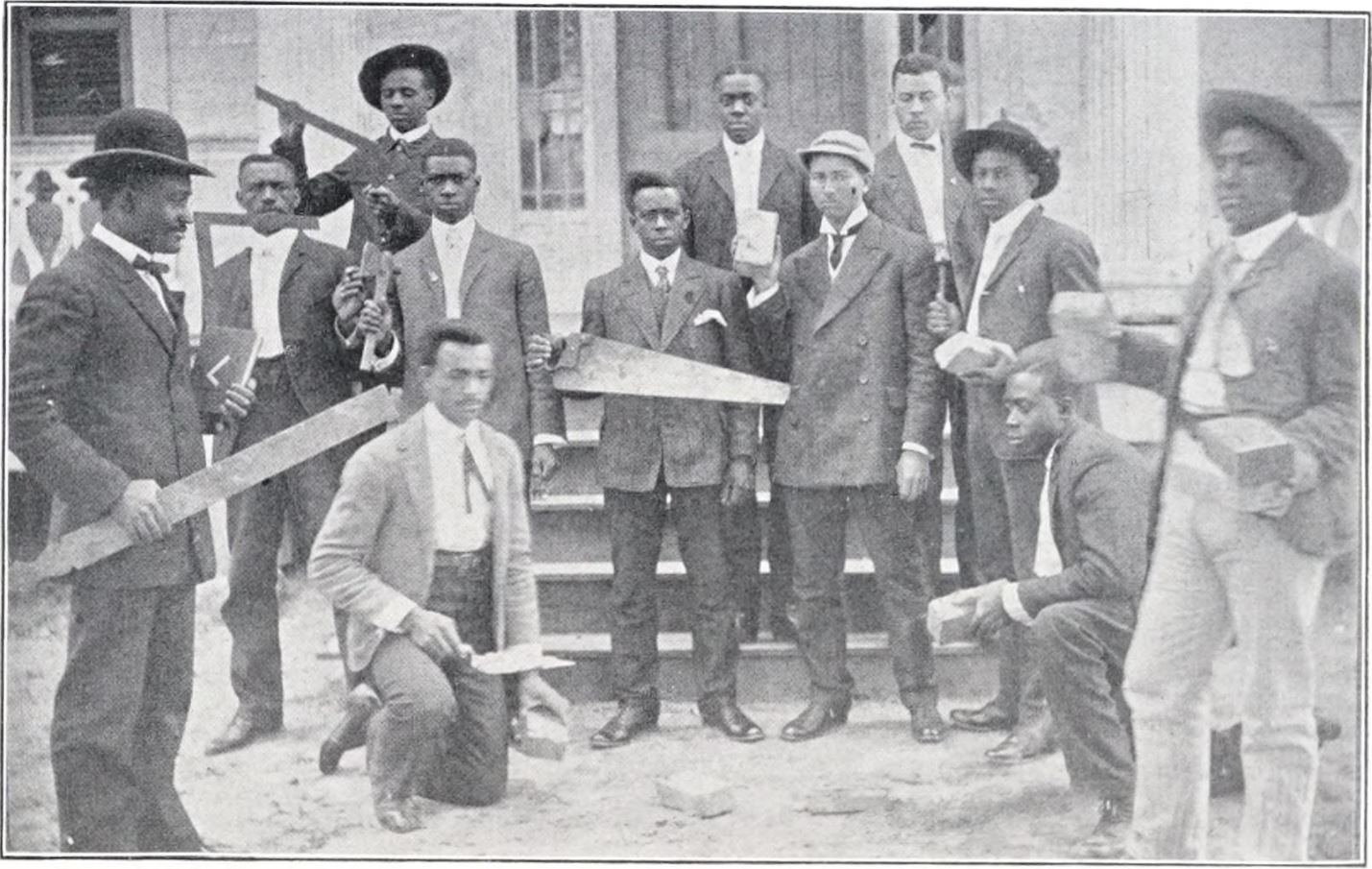
A carpentry class at the seminary, c. 1910

The school was organized in March 1883 by the Colored Methodist Episcopal Church (CME Church) congregation in Washington, Arkansas. (Note: The year of the seminary's founding is given in both the entry for Haygood Seminary in the Encyclopedia of Arkansas and a 1925 book on the history of the CME Church. However, a 2013 historical dictionary on Methodism states that the seminary was one of four established by the CME Church in 1886.) This congregation had been formed in 1867, three years before the formation of the national CME Church in 1870. The idea for the school was pushed for by John Williamson, a former slave whose owner, Samuel Williamson, was a Presbyterian preacher. Williamson pushed for the congregation to support a new educational institution and named the school the Haygood Institute, after Atticus Greene Haygood, a bishop in the Methodist Episcopal Church, South, president of Emory College in Atlanta, and a supporter of education for African Americans. The seminary was under the direction of the CME Church's Little Rock Conference.

The school was established roughly 1 mile (1.6 km) southwest of Washington, in a two-story wooden building on a 10-acre (4.0 ha) campus. Henry Bullock served as the president of the school's board of trustees and was a large supporter of the school. Though the early 1890s, the school expanded to include an elementary department and had had several principals through that time, including Josie Beebe, Ida M. Lane, and H. R. Pickney. In early 1894, the school had its first recorded graduating class, consisting of Frank Carter, Oliver Mitchell, and Bradley R. Williamson. Also by this time, the school had established itself as one of the premier educational institutes for African Americans in the area between Philander Smith College in Little Rock, Arkansas, and Texas College in Tyler, Texas. Haygood Seminary's property at the time was valued at $5,000.

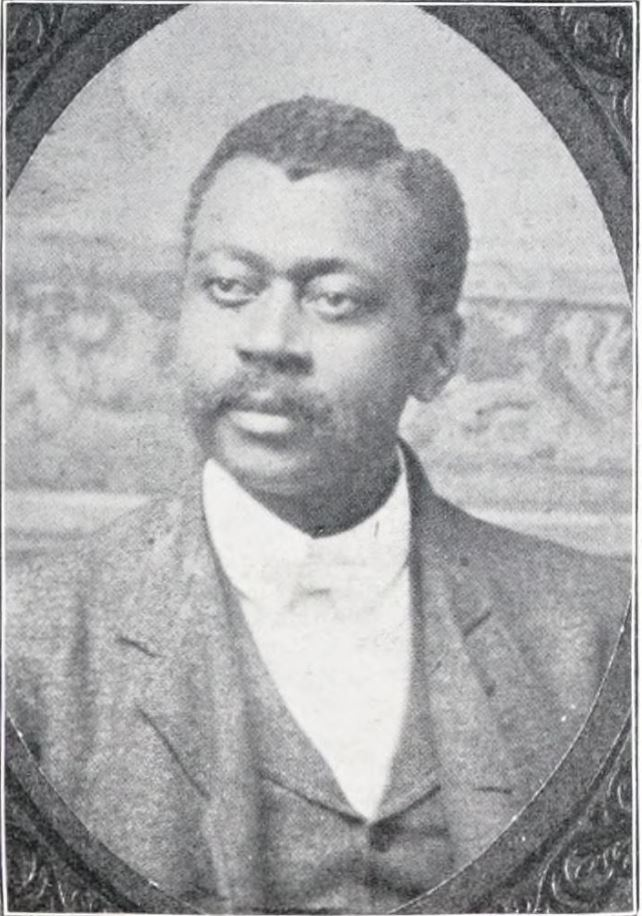
George L. Tyus

In late 1894, the Reverend George L. Tyus, a graduate from Paine College in Augusta, Georgia, and the first African American man in southwest Arkansas to hold an earned academic degree, became the president of the seminary. His time in this position included significant growth for the institution, including the acquisition of a 70-acre (28 ha) farm that students could work on to gain experience and to pay for their education. There was also an increase in other vocational educational opportunities for students. Several new buildings were constructed for the school, including a blacksmith's shop, and classes were offered to teach brick masonry, carpentry, millinery, and sewing. Additionally, a twelve-room, two-story girls' dormitory was built and named Tyus Hall, in honor of the president. In 1908, the school had 166 students and five teachers, with annual expenses of roughly $5,000. Tyus left Haygood Seminary in 1910 to become the president of Texas College.

On February 8, 1915, a fire destroyed several buildings on the campus. Around the same time, the CME Church felt that a better location was needed for a church-supported educational institute in the area. In 1915, they founded the Arkansas-Haygood Industrial College on 300 acres (120 ha) of land roughly 5 miles (8.0 km) south of Pine Bluff, Arkansas, with the college's first classes beginning in 1922. However, the seminary near Washington continued to operate, with a new building constructed at the school in 1921 named Williamson's Hall. By 1927, the seminary had completely relocated to the Pine Bluff location, with the remaining buildings at the old location being sold to the Washington Public School District. From 1919 to 1928, Dominion Robert Glass served as the president of Arkansas–Haygood Industrial College.

The school district operated Lincoln High School, the county's public high school for African Americans, at the site. The last original building from Haygood Seminary, Williamson's Hall, was demolished in 1955. Meanwhile, Arkansas-Haygood Industrial College continued to operate until it closed during World War II.

== Notable alumni ==
- Oliver Mitchell, the first pastor of Bullock Temple CME Church in Little Rock, Arkansas.
- Randall L. Tyus, a field director for the United Negro College Fund and a member of the Small Business Administration during the presidency of John F. Kennedy.
- M. M. Wilburn, a professor at Philander Smith College.

== Sources ==
- Hartshorn, W. N.; Penniman, George W., eds. (1910). An Era of Progress and Promise, 1863–1910: The Religious, Moral, and Educational Development of the American Negro Since His Emancipation. Boston: The Priscilla Publishing Company. LCCN 10009507. OCLC 5343815.
- Patterson, L. Dale (2013). "Christian Methodist Episcopal Church (CME)". In Yrigoyen Jr., Charles; Warrick, Susan E. (eds.). Historical Dictionary of Methodism (3rd ed.). Lanham, Maryland: The Scarecrow Press. pp. 93–94. ISBN 978-0-8108-7894-5.
- Phillips, Charles Henry (1925). The History of the Colored Methodist Episcopal Church in America: Comprising Its Organization, Subsequent Development and Present Status. Vol. 1 (3rd ed.). Jackson, Tennessee: Publishing House C.M.E. Church.
- Williams, Joshua (August 17, 2020). "Haygood Seminary". Encyclopedia of Arkansas. Archived from the original on May 13, 2021.
