= Louisiana Christian Wildcats and Lady Wildcats =

Collegiate sports club in the United States

- University: Louisiana Christian University
- Nickname: Wildcats and Lady Wildcats
- Association: NAIA
- Conference: RRAC; SAC (football only)
- Athletic director: Reni Mason
- Location: Pineville, Louisiana
- Varsity teams: 9
- Football stadium: Wildcat Field
- Basketball arena: H.O. West Fieldhouse
- Baseball stadium: Billy Allgood Field
- Softball stadium: Wildcat Park
- Other venues: Crowell Tennis Center
- Website: www.lcwildcats.net
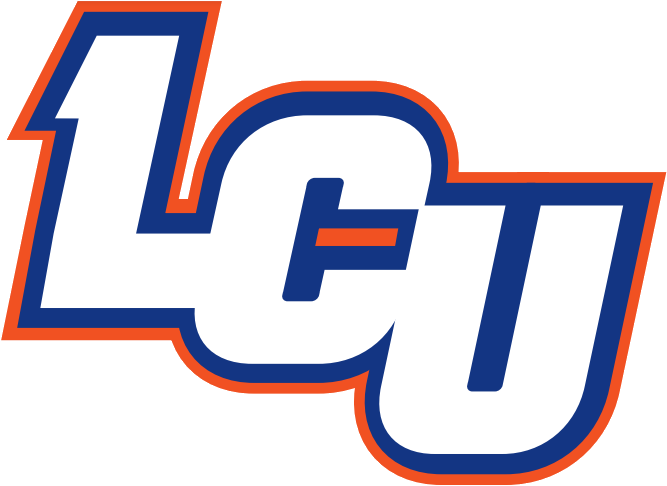

The Louisiana Christian Wildcats and Lady Wildcats are the athletic teams that represent Louisiana Christian University, located in Pineville, Louisiana, in intercollegiate sports as a member of the National Association of Intercollegiate Athletics (NAIA), primarily competing in the Red River Athletic Conference (RRAC) for most of its sports since the 2021–22 academic year; while its football team competes in the Sooner Athletic Conference (SAC). The Wildcats and Lady Wildcats previously competed in the American Southwest Conference (ASC) of the Division III ranks of the National Collegiate Athletic Association (NCAA) from 2000–01 to 2020–21; and in the NAIA's Gulf Coast Athletic Conference (GCAC) from 1981–82 to 1999–2000.

== Varsity teams ==
Louisiana Christian competes in nine intercollegiate varsity sports: Men's sports include baseball, basketball, football, golf, and soccer; women's sports include basketball, soccer, softball, and volleyball. Former sports included men's and women's cross country, women's golf, men's and women's tennis, and men's and women's track & field.

Men's sports	Women's sports
Baseball	Basketball
Basketball	Soccer
Football	Softball
Golf	Volleyball
Soccer	Tennis

=== Baseball ===
The baseball team represents Louisiana Christian University in Pineville, Louisiana, United States. The school's team currently competes in the Red River Athletic Conference, which is part of the NAIA. The team plays its home games at Billy Allgood Field at Legacy Stadium.

=== Men's basketball ===
The men's basketball team represents Louisiana Christian University in Pineville, Louisiana, United States. The school's team currently competes in the Red River Athletic Conference, which is part of the NAIA. The team plays its home games at 4,800-seat H.O. West Fieldhouse.

=== Women's basketball ===
The women's basketball team represents Louisiana Christian University in Pineville, Louisiana, United States. The school's team currently competes in the Red River Athletic Conference, which is part of the NAIA. The team plays its home games at 4,800-seat H.O. West Fieldhouse.

=== Men's and women's cross country ===
The cross country teams represent Louisiana Christian University in Pineville, Louisiana, United States. The school's teams currently competes in the Red River Athletic Conference, which is part of the NAIA.

=== Football ===
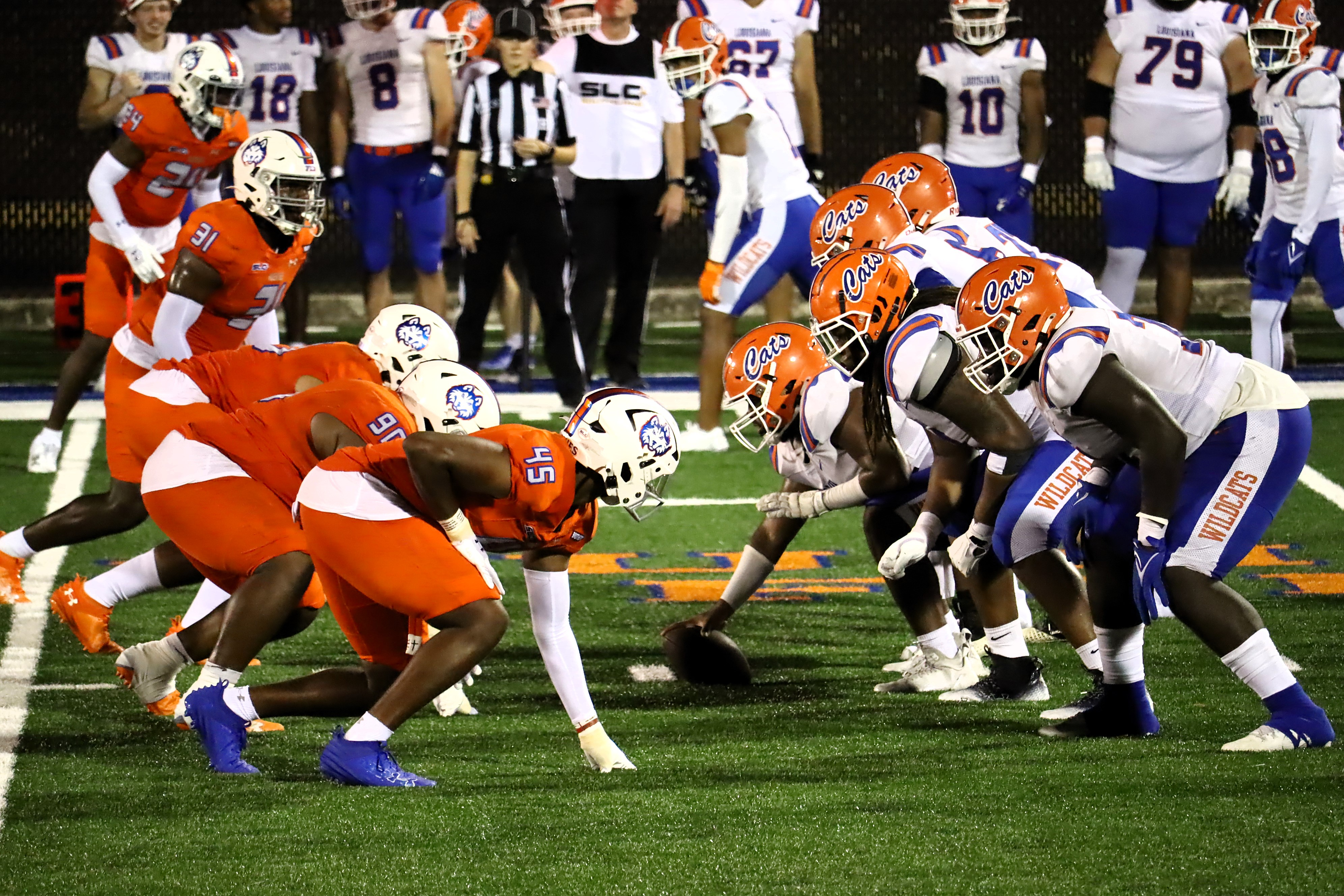
LCU (in white) v Houston Christian University, 2024 football game

The football team competes in the Sooner Athletic Conference, which is part of the NAIA. The team plays its home games at 7,000-seat Wildcat Field.

=== Men's and women's golf ===
The golf teams represent Louisiana Christian University in Pineville, Louisiana, United States. The school's teams currently competes in the Red River Athletic Conference, which is part of the NAIA.

=== Men's and women's soccer ===
The men's and women's soccer teams represent Louisiana Christian University in Pineville, Louisiana, United States. The school's teams currently competes in the Red River Athletic Conference, which is part of the NAIA. The teams play their home games at 7,000-seat Wildcat Field.

=== Softball ===
The softball team represents Louisiana Christian University in Pineville, Louisiana, United States. The school's team currently competes in the Red River Athletic Conference, which is part of the NAIA. The team plays its home games at Wildcat Park.

=== Men's and women's tennis ===
The men's and women's tennis teams represent Louisiana Christian University in Pineville, Louisiana, United States. The school's teams currently competes in the Red River Athletic Conference, which is part of the NAIA. The team plays its home matches at the Crowell Tennis Center.

=== Volleyball ===
The volleyball team represents Louisiana Christian University in Pineville, Louisiana, United States. The school's team currently competes in the Red River Athletic Conference, which is part of the NAIA. The team plays its home games at 4,800-seat H.O. West Fieldhouse.

== Athletic facilities ==
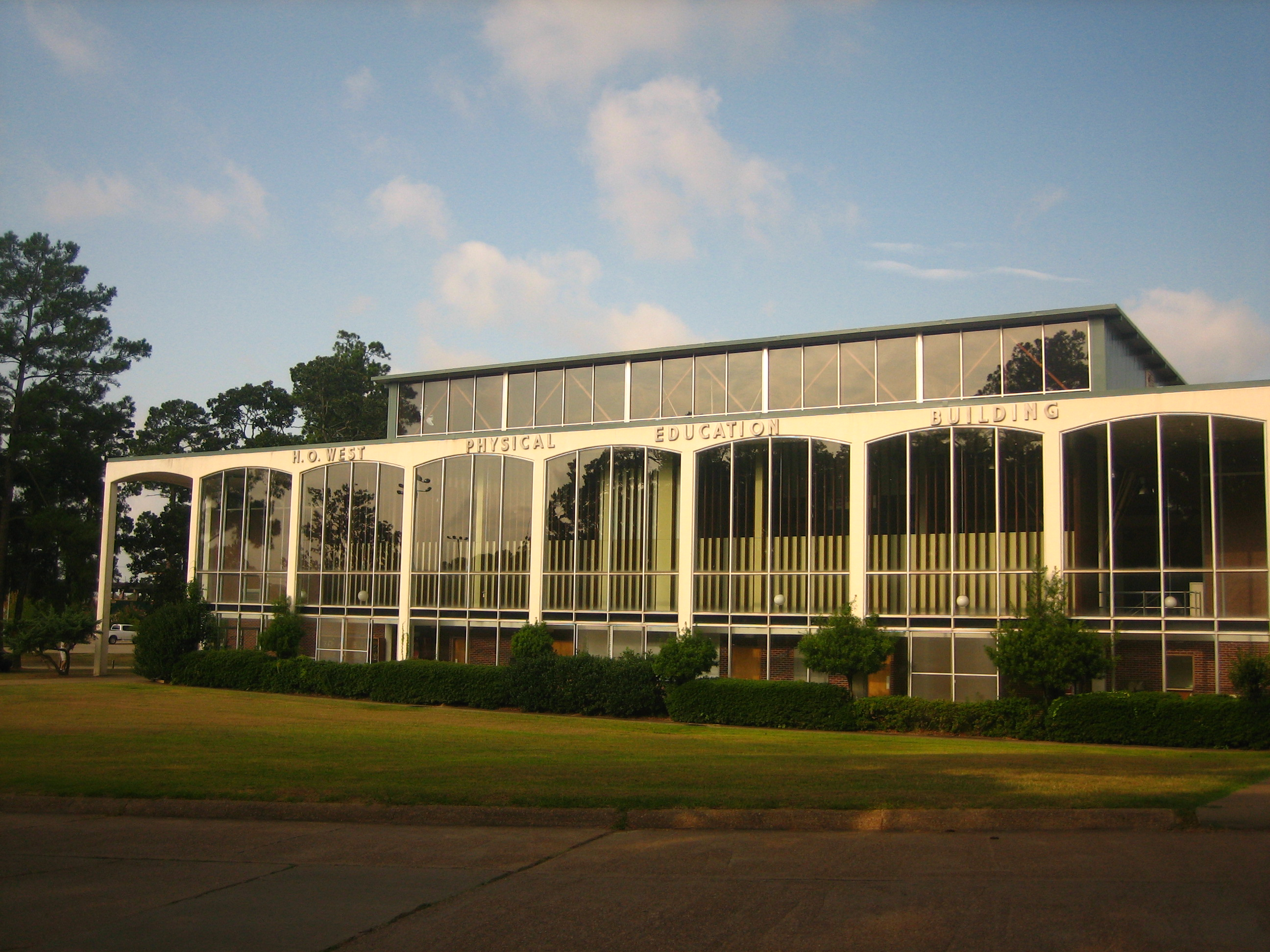
H.O. West Fieldhouse

Venue	Sport(s)	Open.	Ref.
Wildcat Field	Football; Soccer	2008	
Billy Allgood Field	Baseball	1970s	
Richard L. Crowell Center	Tennis	1997	
H.O. West Fieldhouse	Basketball; Volleyball	1965	
Wildcat Park	Softball	2002	
