= Stephanie Y. Evans =

Author and professor of Black Women's Studies

- Born: 1969 (age 56–57)
- Occupations: Professor, Black Women's Studies
- Spouse: Curtis D. Byrd

Academic background
- Education: BA, Interdisciplinary Studies (Comparative Humanities), 1999, California State University, Long Beach; MA, Afro-American Studies and Graduate Certificate in Feminist Studies, 2002. PhD, Afro-American Studies (History, and Politics Concentration). 2003 University of Massachusetts Amherst
- Thesis: Living legacies: Black women, educational philosophies, and community service, 1865-1965 (2003)

Academic work
- Institutions: Georgia State University; Clark Atlanta University; University of Florida; Brown University; Haas Center for Public Service
- Website: professorevans.net

Stephanie Y. Evans (born 1969) is a full professor and former director of the Institute for Women's, Gender and Sexuality Studies at Georgia State University. Until 2019, she served as the Chair of Clark Atlanta University's African American Studies, Africana Women's Studies, and History (AWH) Department.

== Early life and education ==
Evans was born in 1969. Growing up in a performing arts family, she took an affinity to the practice and attended a performing arts middle school. Although she earned a scholarship from the University of Arizona, Evans said she lacked guidance to enroll in university saying "I had a scholarship but I didn’t know what to do with it. Trying to fill out the FAFSA [federal financial aid application] was my breaking point." She began working as a hotel auditor until a friend convinced her to share her poetry with her high school English class.

Evans moved out at age 16, becoming an emancipated youth. At the age of 25, Evans became the first member of her family to enroll and graduate with a post-secondary degree. She completed her Bachelor of Arts degree in comparative humanities from California State University, Long Beach. She earned her Master's degree in Afro-American Studies along with a Graduate Certificate in Feminist Studies History, then earned her PhD in Afro-American Studies (History and Politics Concentration) from University of Massachusetts Amherst, which she received in 2003. After her BA, Evans was a research fellow at Stanford University's Haas Center for Public Service and, while earning her PhD, Evans served as the assistant director of Brown University's Swearer Center for Public Service.

== Career ==
Upon earning her PhD in 2003, Evans earned a joint assistant professor appointment at the University of Florida's Center for Women's Studies and Gender Research and the African American Studies Program. In this role, she began to examine the history of African-American women in the United States post-secondary institutions. Her research accumulated into her first published book in 2007 titled Black Women in the Ivory Tower, 1850-1954: An Intellectual History, which examined how institutional racism and sexism have historically prevented African-American women from succeeding in academia, but how they found ways to creatively resist and develop traditions of empowerment education for future generations. To substantiate her research, she profiled various African-American women who earned doctorate degrees during times of racial tensions including Mary Church Terrell and Anna Julia Cooper. Following its publication, Evans was recognized by the University of Florida for her "outstanding achievements" and honored by the American Educational Research Association as one of the top 10 reviewers of the American Educational Research Journal/Social and Institutional Analysis for the year.

Evans continued to expand on the topic of Black women in academia and co-edited a book titled African Americans and Community Engagement in Higher Education with Colette M. Taylor, Michelle R. Dunlap, and DeMond S. Miller. She later said her research helped her better understand her role in higher education as a Black woman academic. As a result of her academic research, Evans received a University of Florida CLAS Term Professorship, an award given to faculty members "who are making a significant difference in the classroom as well as through their scholarship." She was also recognized by Diverse magazine as one of their 12 "Emerging Scholars" for the year.

Evans left the University of Florida in 2010 to chair Clark Atlanta University (CAU) department of African-American Studies, Africana Women's Studies and History. During her tenure at the school, she founded the W.E.B. Du Bois and the Wings of Atlanta conference and commissioned a bust of his image for CAU. Evans' focus on the works of W.E.B. Du Bois also influenced her academic contributions; she served as an editor for Phylon: Review of Race and Culture and co-edited "Africana Studies at the Graduate Level: A Twenty-first Century Perspective" for the Western Journal of Black Studies. Evans also published her second book titled Black Passports: Travel Memoirs as a Tool for Youth Empowerment, which was collection of 200 African-American memoirs meant to inspire youth. She was recognized for her academic achievement in 2017 with CAU's Aldridge-McMillan Award for Excellence in Research.

In 2019, Evans left CAU to become the Georgia State University's director of the Institute for Women's, Gender, and Sexuality Studies. In the same year, she co-edited Black Women and Social Justice Education: Legacies and Lessons with Andrea D. Domingue and Tania D. Mitchell. In 2022, after twelve consecutive years serving as department chair at University of Florida, Clark Atlanta University, and Georgia State University, she stepped down from that administrative role and continued to write and teach.

== Selected publications ==
The following is a list of selected publications:

- Black Women's Public Health: Strategies to Name, Locate, and Change Systems of Power (2022) co-editor
- Black Women's Yoga History: Memoirs of Inner Peace (2021)
- Black Women and Social Justice Education (2019) - co-editor
- Black Women's Mental Health: Balancing Strength and Vulnerability (2017) - co-editor
- Phylon: Review of Race and Culture (2015) - editor
- Black Passports: Travel Memoirs as a Tool for Youth Empowerment (2014)
- African Americans and Community Engagement in Higher Education (2009) - co-editor
- Black Women in the Ivory Tower, 1850-1954: An Intellectual History (2007)
- Women of color in American higher education (2007)
