= SherRhonda Gibbs =

President of Texas College
- Incumbent
- Assumed office July 2026

Personal details
- Education: Grambling State University; Winona State University; Jackson State University

SherRhonda Gibbs is a U.S. academic administrator and researcher specializing in entrepreneurship among Black and women business owners. She has served as president of Texas College since 2026 and was previously dean of the Morehouse College division of business and economics from 2022 to 2026.

== Life ==
Gibbs was the fourth of six children. She was raised by a single mother and was a first generation college student. She completed a bachelor's degree in computer science at Grambling State University. She earned a M.B.A. from Winona State University and a Ph.D. in business administration with a concentration in management from Jackson State University.

Gibbs' academic research centers on entrepreneurship, specifically examining the social psychological factors and market opportunities experienced by Black and women business owners. She established the Women of Color Entrepreneurs Conference and played a role in acquiring financial backing to open Mississippi's inaugural Minority Business Enterprise Center.

Gibbs taught at Jackson State University. For 12 years, she was a faculty member at University of Southern Mississippi where she was associate dean of accreditation and analytics, interim director of the School of Management, and the Alvin Williams Endowed Chair of Minority Entrepreneurship. While on the faculty Gibbs developed experiential projects such as a Student Venture Fair in which entrepreneurship students launched and sold small products. She later served as dean of the Monfort College of Business at the University of Northern Colorado.

In July 2022, Gibbs became dean of the Morehouse College division of business and economics. On July 1, 2026, she became president of Texas College. She is the first female to serve in the role.
