= University of the Southwest =

Christian university in Hobbs, New Mexico, US

Coordinates: 32°46′28″N 103°11′17″W

- Former names: Hobbs Baptist College (1956–1958); New Mexico Baptist College (1958–1962); College of the Southwest (1962–2008)
- Type: Private university
- Established: 1956
- Accreditation: HLC
- Religious affiliation: Non-denominational Christian
- President: Quint Thurman
- Provost: Ryan Tipton
- Students: 1,009
- Undergraduates: 370
- Postgraduates: 535
- Location: Hobbs, New Mexico
- Colors: Red & Blue
- Nickname: Mustangs
- Sporting affiliations: NAIA – RRAC
- Website: www.usw.edu

The University of the Southwest is a private Christian university in Hobbs, New Mexico, United States. It was incorporated as College of the Southwest in 1962, although the college had existed for several years prior as a two-year Baptist educational institution.

The University of the Southwest grants baccalaureate degrees, the Master of Business Administration (MBA), and the Master of Science in Education. It is accredited by the Higher Learning Commission.

== History ==
The University of the Southwest was founded by B. Clarence Evans as Hobbs Baptist College in 1956. It operated as a two-year junior college until 1958 when it was renamed New Mexico Baptist College in 1958 and began granting four-year degrees.

In 1961, the college moved onto a site just north of Hobbs, New Mexico, and was re-established as an interdenominational private four-year liberal arts college. In the following year, it was renamed the College of the Southwest, and in 2008, its name was again changed to its current name, the University of the Southwest.

== Academics ==
University of the Southwest grants degrees in more than fifty undergraduate and fifteen graduate programs. These programs operate within three academic schools at the University; the School of Arts and Sciences, the School of Business & Professional Studies, and the School of Education.

== Student life ==
There are twelve student organizations at University of the Southwest. These student organizations operate in the areas of professionalism, academic honors, ministry, and civics. The university supports an intramural sports program wherein students, staff, and faculty participate. The University of the Southwest also hosts the Jack Maddox Distinguished Lecture Series.

== Athletics ==
The University of the Southwest (USW) athletics teams are called the Mustangs. The university is a member of the National Association of Intercollegiate Athletics (NAIA), which it initially joined as an independent member in 1994–95. The Mustangs has been competing as part of the Red River Athletic Conference (RRAC) in the majority of its sports since the 1998–99 academic year; excepting its women's golf team, who competes in the Sooner Athletic Conference (SAC).

The USW competes in 13 intercollegiate varsity teams, including baseball, basketball, cross country, golf, soccer, and tennis. In addition, women's teams exist for softball and volleyball. The school once fielded a track and field team, but has ceased to.

On March 15, 2022, a 2017 Ford Transit van containing members of the university's men's and women's golf teams was involved in a collision in Andrews County, Texas. The golf teams had been returning from a golf tournament in Midland, Texas. A pick-up truck crossed the center line of two-lane highway FM 1788 and struck the golf team van head-on, killing nine people. This included six students as well as the coach of the golf team.

== Notable alumni ==
- Khalid Abdulkhalik - Darfur national football team player
