= Top Ladies of Distinction =

Humanitarian organization

Top Ladies of Distinction, Inc.
- Abbreviation: TLOD
- Formation: September 8, 1964; 62 years ago
- Founders: Franchell Boswell, Ina Bolton Brown, Augusta Cash Latham, Ozell Dean, Willie Lee Glass, LaVerne Madlock, Ruth Payne Smith, Georgia Prestwood Nelson
- Type: Educational and humanitarian organization
- Headquarters: Houston, Texas, United States
- Location: International
- National President: Eddie Lee Marsh
- Website: www.tlodinc.org

Top Ladies of Distinction, Inc. is a national professional and humanitarian organization. Based in Houston, Texas, Top Ladies of Distinction has approximately 7,000 members and 111 individual chapters throughout the United States.

== History ==
Top Ladies of Distinction was conceived by Major Ozell Dean of Washington D.C. during a White House luncheon. TLOD was then formed in 1963 after a meeting with former First Lady Lady Bird Johnson. Dean was the first African-American flight nurse in the United States Air Force. The organization was formed to utilize the skill sets of women in the U.S. to help with moral and social issues, especially those affecting the youth. The organization was incorporated in 1964 and held its first national convention in 1969.

== Programs and initiatives ==
Top Ladies of Distinction has many programs and projects providing solutions for social issues and improving underserved communities. This includes anti-bullying initiatives and mentoring for youth. Requirements for local chapters include a teen program (referred to as Top Teens of America) and collaboration with local senior citizen facilities. Teen programs include teaching conflict resolution, personal finance, and coping skills. The group also raises money for and supports other organizations that have included St. Jude, the NAACP, National Council of Negro Women, Sickle Cell Disease Association of America, and UNCF.
