= Willie Lee Glass =

American academic

Willie Lee D. Campbell Glass
- Born: Willie Lee Dorothy Campbell; August 24, 1910; Nacogdoches, Texas, U.S.
- Died: May 2, 1999 (aged 88); Tyler, Texas, U.S.
- Resting place: Cleaver Cemetery, Nacogdoches, Texas, U.S.
- Spouse: Dominion Robert Glass (m. 1936; died 1968)
- Awards: See list

Academic background
- Education: Prairie View State Normal and Industrial College (BS); Iowa State College of Agriculture and Mechanic Arts (MS)
- Thesis: Training, Experience and Salary of Negro Home Economics Teachers in Secondary Schools in Texas (1933)

Academic work
- Discipline: Home economics
- Institutions: Virginia State College; Nacogdoches High School; Texas College; Tyler Junior College; Prairie View A&M College of Texas

Willie Lee Dorothy Campbell Glass (August 24, 1910 – May 2, 1999) was an American academic, consultant, and educator. She was the youngest graduate and first black woman to receive a master’s degree in home economics at Iowa State College of Agriculture and Mechanic Arts, now known as Iowa State University. The city of Tyler, Texas, named a day in her honor.

== Early life and education ==
Willie Lee Dorothy Campbell was born on August 24, 1910 in Nacogdoches, Texas, to Edward John and Mary Gertrude Kennedy Campbell. Her father, Edward John Campbell, was the head of the "colored" schools in Nacogdoches.

She graduated from E. J. Campbell High School, named after her father, as class valedictorian in 1927. She attended Prairie View State Normal & Industrial College. After receiving a Bachelor of Science degree in home economics at Prairie View in 1931, she became the first African-American woman to earn a master's degree in home economics at Iowa State College, receiving a Master of Science degree with honors in 1933. Her thesis was titled "Training, Experience and Salary of Negro Home Economics Teachers in Secondary Schools in Texas". In 1936, she married Dominion Robert Glass, president of Texas College. Texas College is a historically black college in Tyler, Texas.

== Career ==
Soon after graduating from Iowa State College, she began teaching at Virginia State College, where she was the head of the department of food and nutrition. After teaching at the college for around a year, she returned to Nacogdoches to teach at Nacogdoches High School for a short time. In 1950, Glass became the first black woman appointed to the Texas Education Agency. She held the position from 1950 to 1974. In 1981, Governor Bill Clements appointed her to the Texas Board on Aging. She was also a co-founder of the Top Ladies of Distinction, Inc.

== Awards ==
- Distinguished Alumna Award, Prairie View A&M College of Texas, 1961
- Sojourner Truth Award, National Association of Negro Business and Professional Women’s Clubs, 1965
- Dallas Negro Hall of Fame, 1985
- Texas Women's Hall of Fame, Texas Woman's University, 1985
- Woman of the Year, Zonta Club of Tyler, 1985
- T. B. Butler Award, 1986
- Honorary doctorate in Humane Letters, Texas College, 1988
- Distinguished Alumni Award, Iowa State University Alumni Association, 1997

== Recognition ==
- Willie Lee Glass Community Development Services Center at Texas College, Tyler is named after her
- "In Memory of Willie Lee Campbell Glass", 76th Texas Legislature, Senate Resolution No. 890, May 7, 1999
