= North American University =

Private university in Texas

- Former names: Texas Gulf Institute (2007–2010); North American College (2010–2013); North American University (2013–Present)
- Motto: "Inspiration. Innovation. Global Competence."
- Type: Private university
- Established: 2007
- Accreditation: Accrediting Commission of Career Schools and Colleges
- President: Faruk Taban
- Location: Stafford, Texas, United States
- Colors: Blue, White & Silver
- Nickname: Stallions
- Sporting affiliations: NAIA – RRAC
- Mascot: Stallion
- Website: www.na.edu

North American University (NAU) is a private university in Stafford, Texas, United States. NAU offers bachelor's and master's degree programs in Business Administration, Criminal Justice, Computer Science, and Education. In the fall of 2013, the university changed its name from Texas Gulf Institute to its current name.

== History ==
NAU is an institution of higher education founded as Texas Gulf Institute in April 2007. The institute offered certificate programs for the first two years of its inception. Upon approval by the Texas Higher Education Coordinating Board (THECB) to offer bachelor's degree programs in July 2010, the school applied to change its name to North American College (NAC).

During the 2010–11 academic year the college moved into its new administrative and educational building located at 3203 N. Sam Houston Pkwy West in Houston, Texas. In 2017, physician Serif Ali Tekalan was appointed the third president of the university, succeeding Recayi "Reg" Pecen, an engineer, who had been appointed in 2012.

In May 2013, the college had its first commencement. The class of 2013 included twelve students; nine graduated with a bachelor's degree in business administration and three with a bachelor's degree in interdisciplinary studies in education.

In the fall of 2013, NAC changed to its name to North American University (NAU). There are more than 800 students in its ESL, bachelor's degree and master's degree programs. Students come from over 33 U.S. states and over 54 countries.

== Academics ==
NAU offers three bachelor's degree programs: Interdisciplinary Studies in Education, Computer Science, Criminal Justice and Business Administration. Bachelor's degree programs are organized under a different administrative department. NAU also offers five master's degree programs: M.Ed. in educational leadership, M.Ed. in Curriculum and Instruction, M.Ed. in School Counseling, MBA, and an M.S. in Computer Science.

The university is accredited by the Accrediting Commission of Career Schools and Colleges and approved by Texas Higher Education Coordinating Board to award bachelor's and master's degrees. The Gulf Language School is accredited by The Commission on English Language Program Accreditation.

In June 2023 the Southern Association of Colleges and Schools educational accreditor rejected the university's application for accreditation. The accreditor's board found NAU unable to comply with the board's standards for hiring full-time faculty, financial resources and financial documentation.

== Athletics ==
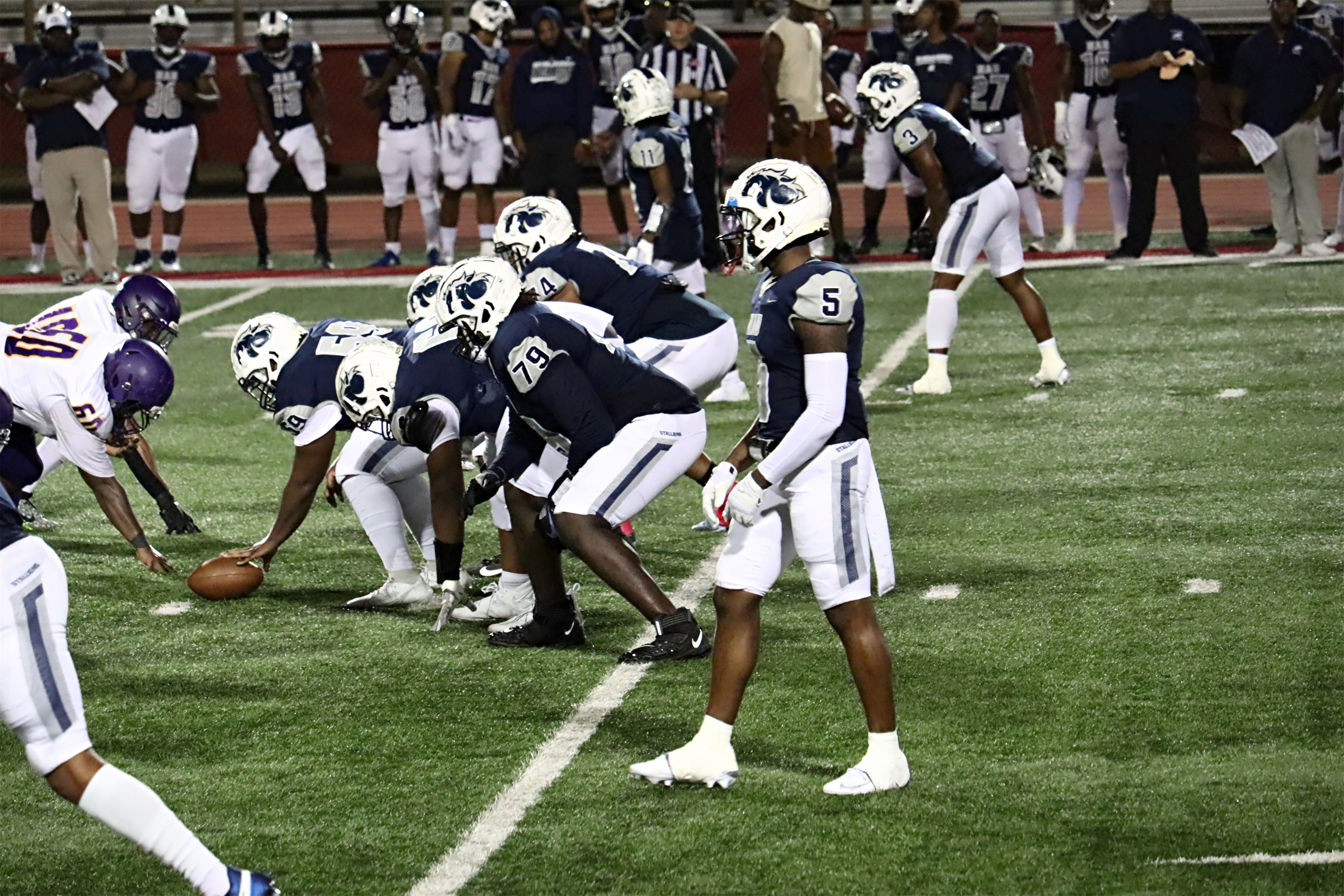
NAU playing a football game in 2023

The North American athletic teams are called the Stallions. The university competes as a member of the National Association of Intercollegiate Athletics (NAIA), primarily competing in the Red River Athletic Conference (RRAC) as an associate member since the 2023–24 academic year, while their football team competes as an associate member in the Sooner Athletic Conference. The Stallions previously competed as an NAIA Independent within the Continental Athletic Conference during the 2022–23 school year (when the school joined the NAIA).

North American competes in eight intercollegiate varsity sports. Men's sports include basketball, football, soccer and track & field; women's sports include basketball, soccer, cross country and track & field. They are looking to add more sports in the near future: esports, cheerleading, volleyball, and wrestling.

Their football program competed without affiliation for a few years. Their first season was during the COVID pandemic in fall 2020. On Feb 10, 2025 NAU decided to end the football program. The decision was made after the Board of Trustees agreed to make cost cutting moves

== Student services ==
University dorms, which are located on the main campus, provide housing and meal services for its residential university students. In addition, there is an academic resource center supported by Student Success. In 2015, NAU added Career and Alumni Services to its student service list and now offers career counseling.
