= Red River Athletic Conference =

American collegiate athletics conference

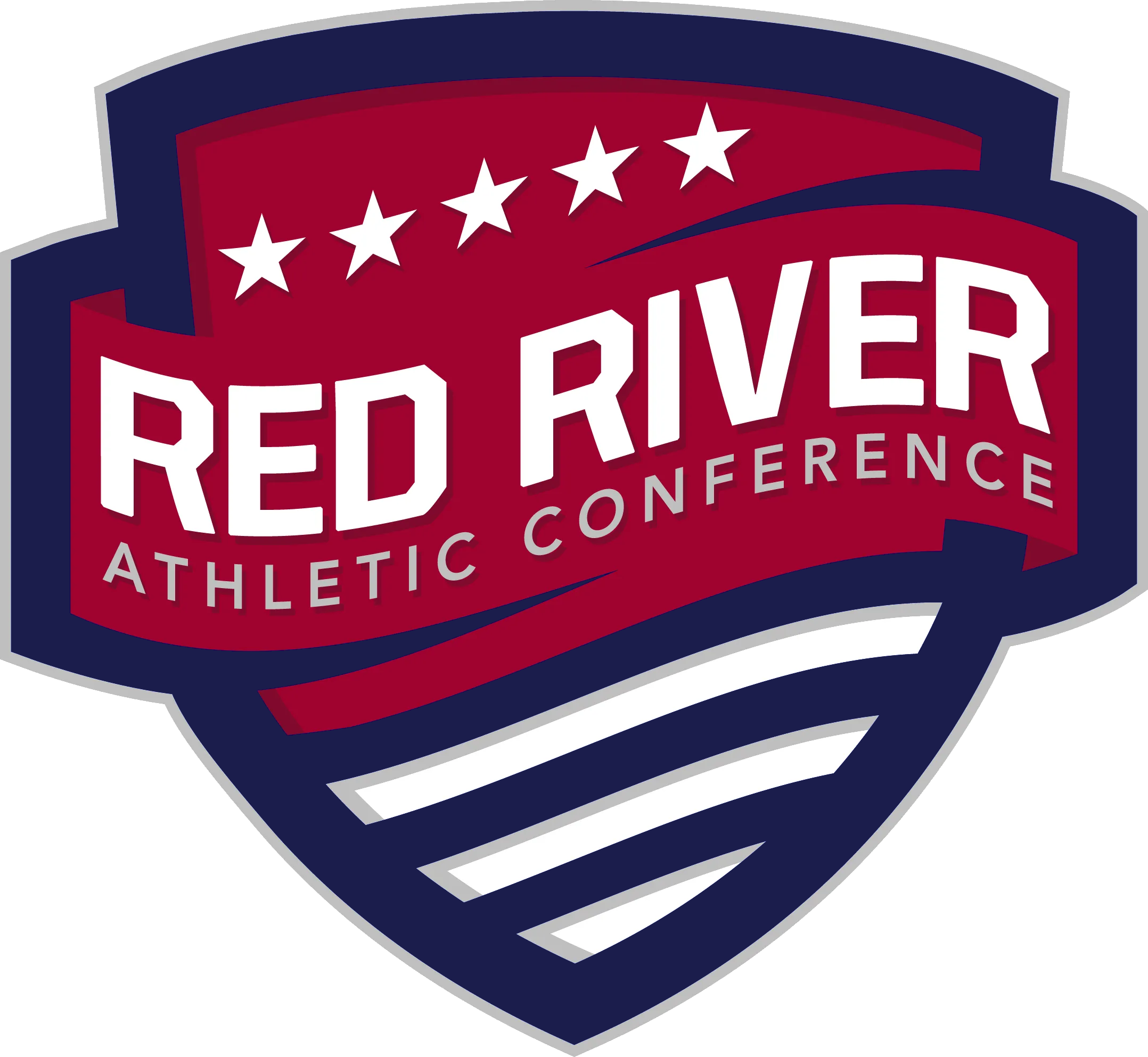
- Association: NAIA
- Founded: 1998; 28 years ago
- Commissioner: Jason Horn
- Sports fielded: 15; men's: 7; women's: 8
- No. of teams: 11 (10 in 2027)
- Headquarters: Waco, Texas
- Region: South Central United States
- Website: www.redriverconference.com

Locations
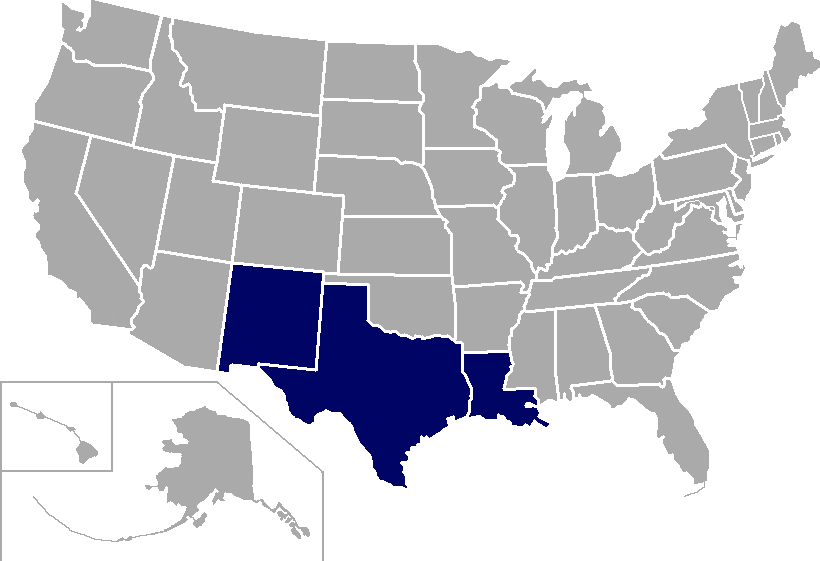

The Red River Athletic Conference is a college athletic conference affiliated with the National Association of Intercollegiate Athletics (NAIA). The conference's 11 member institutions are located in Louisiana, New Mexico, and Texas.

== History ==
Red River Athletic Conference
Location of RRAC members: current, current (non-basketball), departing

The Red River Athletic Conference (RRAC) began competition in fall 1998 with 16 charter members. The conference at present counts 14 members, one of the most recent additions being Texas A&M University–Texarkana in 2016. In 2019, St. Thomas Houston announced its departure from the conference to join the Southern Collegiate Athletic Conference (SCAC) of the NCAA Division III as a provisional member. In March 2020, Texas A&M University–San Antonio was approved for membership into the NAIA and it was simultaneously announced that the Jaguars would begin competition in the conference starting in the 2020–21 academic year, followed by Xavier University of Louisiana and Louisiana Christian University (formerly Louisiana College) in September and October respectively. Xavier and Louisiana Christian officially joined the RRAC for the 2021–22 academic year.

On January 20, 2022, the Gulf Coast Athletic Conference (GCAC) invited founding Red River member Wiley College (now Wiley University) to become the GCAC's first Texas institution, effective later in July.

On July 6, 2023, North American University was accepted as the RRAC's 14th conference member for the 2023–24 school year.

On July 1, 2025, the RRAC announced the addition of the University of North Texas at Dallas as a full conference member. UNTD was previously a full member of the Sooner Athletic Conference.

=== Chronological timeline ===
- 1998 – The Red River Athletic Conference (RRAC) was founded. Charter members included Bacone College, Houston Baptist University (now Houston Christian University), Huston–Tillotson University, Jarvis Christian College (now Jarvis Christian University), Langston University, Northwestern Oklahoma State University, Northwood University–Texas, Paul Quinn College, the University of Science and Arts of Oklahoma, the University of the Southwest, Southwestern Adventist University, Southwestern Assemblies of God University (now Nelson University), the University of Texas Permian Basin, Texas College and Wiley College (now Wiley University), beginning the 1998–99 academic year.
- 2000 – USAO left the RRAC to join the Sooner Athletic Conference (SAC) after the 1999–2000 academic year.
- 2001:
  - Northwestern Oklahoma State left the RRAC to join the Sooner after the 2000–01 academic year.
  - Texas Wesleyan University joined the RRAC in the 2001–02 academic year.
- 2002:
  - Southwestern Adventist left the RRAC and the NAIA to become an Independent within the United States Collegiate Athletic Association (USCAA) after the 2001–02 academic year.
  - Texas A&M International University joined the RRAC in the 2002–03 academic year.
- 2006:
  - Texas–Permian Basin (UTPB) and Texas A&M–International (TAMIU) left the RRAC and the NAIA to join the Division II ranks of the National Collegiate Athletic Association (NCAA) and the Heartland Conference after the 2005–06 academic year.
  - The University of Texas at Brownsville (Texas–Brownsville or UT Brownsville or UTB) joined the RRAC in the 2006–07 academic year.
- 2007 – Houston Baptist (now Houston Christian) left the RRAC and the NAIA to join the NCAA Division I ranks as an NCAA D-I Independent (which would later join the Great West Conference, beginning the 2008–09 school year) after the 2006–07 academic year.
- 2008 – Our Lady of the Lake University joined the RRAC in the 2008–09 academic year.
- 2010 – Louisiana State University–Shreveport (Louisiana State–Shreveport or LSU Shreveport) joined the RRAC in the 2010–11 academic year.
- 2012 – The University of St. Thomas joined the RRAC in the 2012–13 academic year.
- 2013 – Northwood–Texas, SAGU (now Nelson) and Texas Wesleyan left the RRAC to join the Sooner after the 2012–13 academic year.
- 2014 – Louisiana State University–Alexandria (Louisiana State–Alexandria or LSU Alexandria) joined the RRAC in the 2014–15 academic year.
- 2015:
  - Two institutions left the RRAC to join their respective new home primary conferences, both effective after the 2014–15 academic year:
    - Bacone to join the Sooner
    - and Texas–Brownsville (UTB) athletics was discontinued due to the merger with the University of Texas–Pan American (UTPA) to become the University of Texas Rio Grande Valley (UTRGV).
  - The University of Houston–Victoria (Houston–Victoria or UHV; now Texas A&M University–Victoria) joined the RRAC in the 2015–16 academic year.
- 2016 – Texas A&M University–Texarkana (Texas A&M–Texarkana or TAMUT) joined the RRAC in the 2016–17 academic year.
- 2018 – Langston left the RRAC to join the Sooner after the 2017–18 academic year.
- 2019 – St. Thomas (Tex.) left the RRAC to join the NCAA Division III ranks and the Southern Collegiate Athletic Conference (SCAC) after the 2018–19 academic year.
- 2020 – Texas A&M University–San Antonio (Texas A&M–San Antonio or TAMUSA) joined the RRAC in the 2020–21 academic year.
- 2021 – Louisiana Christian University (formerly Louisiana College) and Xavier University of Louisiana joined the RRAC in the 2021–22 academic year.
- 2022:
  - Wiley left the RRAC to join the Gulf Coast Athletic Conference (GCAC) after the 2021–22 academic year.
  - Lewis–Clark State College joined the RRAC as an affiliate member for women's tennis in the 2023 spring season (2022–23 academic year).
- 2023:
  - North American University joined the RRAC in the 2023–24 academic year.
  - Carroll College, Montana Technological University (Montana Tech), the University of Providence and Rocky Mountain College joined the RRAC as affiliate members for men's golf in the 2024 spring season (2023–24 academic year).
- 2024 – Five institutions left the RRAC as affiliate members, all effective after the 2024 spring season (2023–24 academic year):
  - Lewis–Clark State for women's tennis
  - and Carroll (Mont.), Montana Tech, Providence (Mont.) and Rocky Mountain for men's golf
- 2025:
  - Huston–Tillotson and Paul Quinn left the RRAC to join the HBCU Athletic Conference (HBCUAC) after the 2024–25 academic year.
  - The University of North Texas at Dallas (a.k.a. UNT Dallas) joined the RRAC in the 2025–26 academic year.
  - Houston–Victoria (UHV) was transferred to the Texas A&M University System, becoming Texas A&M–Victoria, effective September 1, 2025. The school remains in the RRAC.
- 2026 – Two institutions left the RRAC to join their respective new home primary conferences, both effective beginning the 2026–27 academic year:
  - Xavier (La.) to join the Southern States Athletic Conference (SSAC)
  - Jarvis Christian to join the HBCUAC
- 2027 – Texas A&M–Texarkana will join the NCAA Division II ranks and the Lone Star Conference (LSC) beginning the 2027–28 academic year.

== Member schools ==
=== Current members ===
The RRAC currently has 11 full members, with a slight majority (six) being public schools.

| Institution | Location | Founded | Affiliation | Enrollment | Nickname | Joined (Note: Represents the calendar year when fall sports competition begins.) | Basketball? |
|---|---|---|---|---|---|---|---|
| Louisiana Christian University | Pineville, Louisiana | 1906 | Southern Baptist | 936 | Wildcats | 2021 | both |
| Louisiana State University of Alexandria | Alexandria, Louisiana | 1959 | Public (Note: Part of the Louisiana State University System.) | 6,815 | Generals | 2014 | both |
| Louisiana State University Shreveport | Shreveport, Louisiana | 1967 | Public | 10,749 | Pilots | 2010 | both |
| North American University | Stafford, Texas | 2007 | Nonsectarian | 983 | Stallions | 2023 | both |
| University of North Texas at Dallas | Dallas, Texas | 2000 | Public (Note: Part of the University of North Texas System.) | 3,794 | Trailblazers | 2025 | both |
| Our Lady of the Lake University | San Antonio, Texas | 1895 | Catholic (C.D.P.) | 1,968 | Saints | 2008 | both (Note: The Our Lady of the Lake men's and women's basketball teams joined the RRAC a year after becoming a full member for other sports (2009–10).) |
| University of the Southwest | Hobbs, New Mexico | 1962 | Nondenominational | 1,130 | Mustangs | 1998 | both (Note: The Southwest (N.Mex.) men's and women's basketball teams joined the RRAC a decade after becoming a full member for other sports (2008–09).) |
| Texas College | Tyler, Texas | 1894 | C.M.E. Church (Note: Also a historically black college and university.) | 614 | Steers | 1998 | both |
| Texas A&M University–San Antonio | San Antonio, Texas | 2009 | Public (Note: Part of the Texas A&M University System.) | 7,956 | Jaguars | 2020 | both (Note: The Texas A&M–San Antonio men's and women's basketball teams joined the RRAC four years after becoming a full member for other sports (2024–25).) |
| Texas A&M University–Texarkana | Texarkana, Texas | 1971 | Public | 2,412 | Eagles | 2016 | both (Note: The Texas A&M–Texarkana men's and women's basketball teams joined the RRAC three years after becoming a full member for other sports (2019–20).) (Note: Texas A&M–Texarkana will depart the RRAC for the NCAA Division II Lone Star Conference (LSC) after the 2025–26 school year.) |
| Texas A&M University–Victoria (Note: Texas A&M–Victoria joined the RRAC as the University of Houston–Victoria, known athletically as UHV. The university transferred from the University of Houston System to the Texas A&M University System on September 1, 2025.) | Victoria, Texas | 1973 | Public | 3,586 | Jaguars | 2015 | none |

=== Former members ===
The RRAC has 18 former full members, all but five were private schools:

| Institution | Location | Founded | Affiliation | Nickname | Joined (Note: Represents the calendar year when fall sports competition begins.) | Left (Note: Represents the calendar year when spring sports competition ends.) | Current conference |
|---|---|---|---|---|---|---|---|
| Bacone College | Muskogee, Oklahoma | 1880 | Tribal college | Warriors | 1998 (Note: The Bacone men's and women's basketball teams joined the RRAC three years after becoming a full member for other sports (2001–02).) | 2015 | Closed in 2025 |
| Houston Baptist University (Note: Currently known as Houston Christian University since 2022.) | Houston, Texas | 1960 | Baptist | Huskies | 1998 | 2007 | Southland (SLC) (Note: Currently an NCAA Division I athletic conference.) |
| Huston-Tillotson University | Austin, Texas | 1881 | UMC & UCC (Note: Also a historically black college and university.) | Rams | 1998 | 2025 | HBCU (HBCUAC) |
| Jarvis Christian University | Hawkins, Texas | 1912 | Disciples of Christ | Bulldogs | 1998 | 2026 | HBCU (HBCUAC) |
| Langston University | Langston, Oklahoma | 1897 | Public | Lions | 1998 | 2018 | Sooner (SAC) |
| Northwestern Oklahoma State University | Alva, Oklahoma | 1897 | Public | Rangers | 1998 | 2001 | Great American (GAC) (Note: Currently an NCAA Division II athletic conference.) |
| Northwood University | Cedar Hill, Texas | 1966 | Nonsectarian | Knights | 1998 (Note: The Northwood–Texas men's and women's basketball teams joined the RRAC fourteen years after becoming a full member for other sports (2012–13).) | 2013 | Closed in 2014 |
| Paul Quinn College | Dallas, Texas | 1872 | A.M.E. Church | Tigers | 1998 | 2025 | HBCU (HBCUAC) |
| University of St. Thomas | Houston, Texas | 1947 | Catholic (C.S.B.) | Celts | 2011 | 2019 | Southern (SCAC) (Note: Currently an NCAA Division III athletic conference.) |
| University of Science and Arts of Oklahoma | Chickasha, Oklahoma | 1908 | Public | Drovers | 1998 | 2000 | Sooner (SAC) |
| Southwestern Adventist University | Keene, Texas | 1893 | Seventh-day; Adventist | Knights | 1998 | 2002 | USCAA Independent |
| Southwestern Assemblies of God University (Note: Currently known as Nelson University since 2024.) | Waxahachie, Texas | 1927 | Assemblies of God | Lions | 1998 | 2013 | Sooner (SAC) |
| Texas A&M International University | Laredo, Texas | 1969 | Public | Dustdevils | 2002 (Note: The Texas A&M International men's and women's basketball teams joined the RRAC a year after becoming a full member for other sports (2003–04).) | 2006 | Lone Star (LSC) |
| Texas Wesleyan University | Fort Worth, Texas | 1890 | United Methodist | Rams | 2001 | 2013 | Sooner (SAC) |
| University of Texas at Brownsville (Note: Non-basketball full member.) | Brownsville, Texas | 1991 | Public | Ocelots (Note: UT Brownsville's other nickname before the merger with Texas–Pan American (UTPA) was Scorpions until after the 2011–12 school year, then competed without a nickname during the 2012–13 school year, before adopting the Ocelots nickname for their final two seasons.) | 2006 | 2015 | N/A (Note: Texas–Brownsville (UTB) was merged with the University of Texas–Pan American (UTPA) to become the University of Texas–Rio Grande Valley (UTRGV) in 2015. The new institution inherited the UTPA athletic program, which now operates as the UTRGV Vaqueros in the NCAA Division I Southland Conference.) |
| University of Texas Permian Basin | Odessa, Texas | 1973 | Public | Falcons | 1998 (Note: The Texas–Permian Basin men's and women's basketball teams joined the RRAC four years after becoming a full member for other sports (2002–03).) | 2006 | Lone Star (LSC) |
| Wiley University (Note: Current known as Wiley University since 2023.) | Marshall, Texas | 1873 | United Methodist | Wildcats | 1998 (Note: The Wiley men's and women's basketball teams joined the RRAC four years after becoming a full member for other sports (2002–03).) | 2022 | HBCU (HBCUAC) |
| Xavier University of Louisiana | New Orleans, Louisiana | 1925 | Catholic (S.B.S.) | Gold Rush & Gold Nuggets | 2021 | 2026 | Southern States (SSAC) |

=== Former affiliate members ===
The RRAC had five former affiliate members, three are public schools and two are private schools:

| Institution | Location | Founded | Affiliation | Nickname | Joined (Note: Represents the calendar year when fall sports competition begins.) | Left (Note: Represents the calendar year when spring sports competition ends.) | RRAC sport(s) | Primary conference |
|---|---|---|---|---|---|---|---|---|
| Carroll College | Helena, Montana | 1909 | Catholic (Diocese of Helena) | Fighting Saints | 2023 | 2024 | Men's golf | Frontier |
| Lewis–Clark State College | Lewiston, Idaho | 1893 | Public | Warriors & Lady Warriors | 2022 | 2024 | Women's tennis | Cascade (CCC) |
| Montana Technological University | Butte, Montana | 1889 | Public (Note: Part of the Montana University System.) | Orediggers | 2023 | 2024 | Men's golf | Frontier |
| University of Providence | Great Falls, Montana | 1932 | Catholic (Ursulines) | Argonauts | 2023 | 2024 | Men's golf | Frontier |
| Rocky Mountain College | Billings, Montana | 1878 | various (Note: Rocky Mountain has various affiliations: The Mainline Protestant, the United Methodist Church, the Presbyterian Church (USA), and the United Church of Christ.) | Battlin' Bears | 2023 | 2024 | Men's golf | Frontier |

=== Membership timeline ===
Full member (non-football) Associate member (sport)

== Sports ==
A divisional format is used for basketball (M / W), softball, and volleyball.
East
- Jarvis Christian
- Louisiana Christian
- LSU Alexandria
- LSU Shreveport
- Texas College
- Texas A&M-Texarkana
- Xavier
West
- North American
- Our Lady of the Lake
- Southwest
- Texas A&M-San Antonio
- Texas A&M-Victoria
- UNT-Dallas

The Red River Athletic Conference sponsors championships in seven men's and eight women's sports.

Conference sports
| Sport | Men's | Women's |
|---|---|---|
| Baseball | ✓ | |
| Basketball | ✓ | ✓ |
| Cross Country | ✓ | ✓ |
| Golf | ✓ | ✓ |
| Soccer | ✓ | ✓ |
| Softball | | ✓ |
| Tennis | ✓ | ✓ |
| Track and Field (Outdoor) | ✓ | ✓ |
| Volleyball | | ✓ |

=== RRAC men's sports sponsored by school ===
| School | Baseball | Basketball | Cross country | Golf | Tennis | Track & field (outdoor) | Soccer |
|---|---|---|---|---|---|---|---|
| Louisiana Christian | Yes | Yes | No | Yes | No | No | Yes |
| LSU-Alexandria | Yes | Yes | No | No | No | No | Yes |
| LSU-Shreveport | Yes | Yes | No | No | No | No | Yes |
| North American | No | Yes | No | No | No | Yes | Yes |
| North Texas-Dallas | No | Yes | Yes | No | No | Yes | No |
| Our Lady of the Lake | Yes | Yes | Yes | Yes | Yes | Yes | Yes |
| Southwest | Yes | Yes | Yes | Yes | No | No | Yes |
| Texas College | Yes | Yes | No | No | No | Yes | Yes |
| Texas A&M-San Antonio | No | Yes | No | Yes | No | No | Yes |
| Texas A&M-Texarkana | Yes | Yes | Yes | Yes | Yes | Yes | Yes |
| Texas A&M-Victoria | Yes | No | No | Yes | No | No | Yes |

=== RRAC women's sports sponsored by school ===
| School | Softball | Basketball | Cross country | Golf | Tennis | Track & field (outdoor) | Soccer | Volleyball |
|---|---|---|---|---|---|---|---|---|
| Louisiana Christian | Yes | Yes | No | No | Yes | No | Yes | Yes |
| LSU-Alexandria | Yes | Yes | No | No | Yes | No | Yes | No |
| LSU-Shreveport | No | Yes | No | No | Yes | No | Yes | No |
| North American | No | Yes | Yes | No | No | Yes | Yes | No |
| North Texas-Dallas | No | Yes | Yes | No | No | Yes | No | No |
| Our Lady of the Lake | Yes | Yes | Yes | Yes | Yes | Yes | Yes | Yes |
| Southwest | Yes | Yes | Yes | Yes | No | No | Yes | Yes |
| Texas College | Yes | Yes | No | No | No | Yes | Yes | No |
| Texas A&M-San Antonio | Yes | Yes | No | No | No | No | Yes | No |
| Texas A&M-Texarkana | Yes | Yes | Yes | Yes | Yes | Yes | Yes | Yes |
| Texas A&M-Victoria | Yes | No | No | Yes | No | No | Yes | No |
