= Wesleyan Christian Advocate =

Former newspaper in Georgia

The Wesleyan Christian Advocate (WCA) was a Methodist publication in Georgia.

Preceded by the Southern Christian Advocate, WCA was first published in 1878 after relocating to Charleston, South Carolina.

Atticus Greene Haygood and W. C. Lovett served as editors.

WCA published its final edition in May 2009. It was succeeded by two papers: The North Georgia Advocate and the South Georgia Advocate.
