= Sooner Athletic Conference =

American college athletic conference

- Association: NAIA
- Founded: 1978; 48 years ago
- Commissioner: John Martin
- Sports fielded: 18; men's: 9; women's: 9
- No. of teams: 12 (11 in 2028)
- Headquarters: Oklahoma City, OK
- Region: South Central United States
- Website: soonerathletic.org

Locations
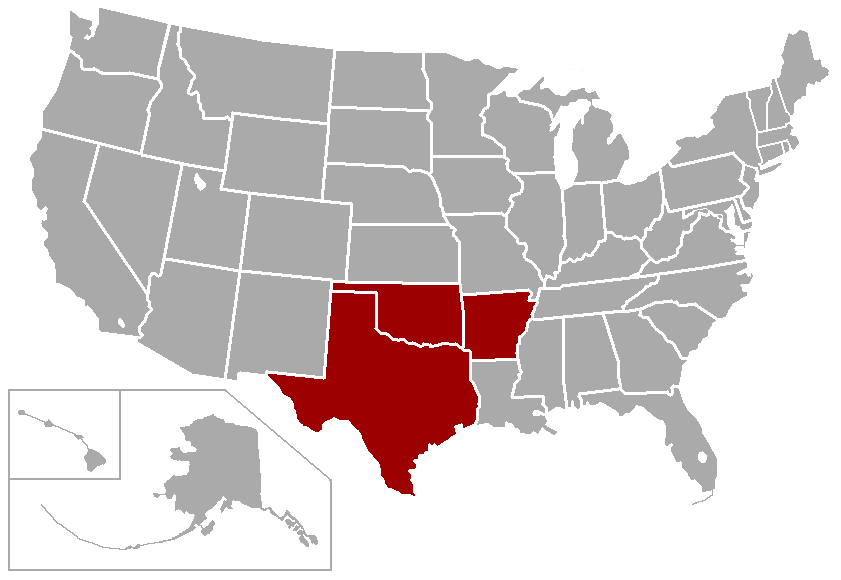

The Sooner Athletic Conference (SAC) is a college athletic conference affiliated with the National Association of Intercollegiate Athletics (NAIA). Originally developed as a five-team conference of Oklahoma-based schools, the SAC now boasts 12 schools in a league that spans five states – Arkansas, Kansas, Missouri, Oklahoma, and Texas.

As of August 2021, SAC member institutions have collected 109 National Association of Intercollegiate Athletics (NAIA) team championships – the most among NAIA conferences – since the league formed in 1978.

The SAC crowns league champions in 18 intercollegiate sports – nine for women and nine for men. Women's sports are basketball, softball, golf, tennis, cross country, soccer, volleyball, indoor track & field, outdoor track & field, and wrestling. Men's sports are football, basketball, baseball, golf, tennis, cross country, indoor track & field, outdoor track & field, soccer, and wrestling. The newest conference sport is women's wrestling, added for the 2019–20 season.

The conference is known for a rich basketball tradition. Member schools have won the men's NAIA tournament 12 times and women's NAIA tournament 16 times. SAC member schools also boast 14 NAIA national titles in men's golf, 13 in softball, 12 in women's indoor track and field, 10 in women's golf, 10 in men's cross country, 6 in men's tennis, 5 in women's outdoor track and field, 5 in men's indoor track and field, 4 in men's outdoor track and field, 2 in baseball, 2 in competitive cheer, and 1 in men's soccer for a total of 112.

== History ==
Sooner Athletic Conference
Location of SAC members: current, departing

The league's newest addition is the University of North Texas Dallas, which entered the conference as a full member for 2021–22 and an associate member in 2020–21. The SAC added Central Christian College of Kansas and Oklahoma Panhandle State University to the fold for 2017–18, then dropped to 11 schools when St. Gregory's announced its closure in November 2017. The league added Langston University in 2018–19 as its first historically black college and university (HBCU) member, then dropped Bacone (Okla.) College after that same year.

Throughout the league's history, the SAC continues to be known as the conference "Where Champions Play". Various institutions have competed under the SAC banner over the years. Today only the University of Science and Arts of Oklahoma remains from the original group that was formed when Bethany Nazarene (now Southern Nazarene), Oklahoma Baptist, Oklahoma Christian, and Phillips University withdrew from the Texoma Conference to form the SAC.

Membership has changed over the years with today's current members being admitted as follows: Oklahoma City (1986), Wayland Baptist (1994), John Brown (1995), Mid-America Christian (2007), Southwestern Assemblies of God (2013), Texas Wesleyan (2013), Southwestern Christian (2013), Bacone (2014), Central Christian (2017), Oklahoma Panhandle State (2017), and College of the Ozarks (2025).

The league also includes associate members on a per-sport basis, with University of Houston–Victoria, University of the Southwest, and University of St. Thomas being part of the SAC in women's golf since 2017. Lyon College has been an associate member for women's wrestling since 2019.

Past members of the SAC include: Oklahoma Baptist, Oklahoma Christian, Southern Nazarene, Rogers State, Lubbock Christian, Northwestern Oklahoma State, Northwood, St. Gregory's, and Bacone.

Furthermore, the league includes associate members on a per-sport basis. Arizona Christian University, Lyon (Ark.) College, Ottawa University-Arizona, and Texas College became SAC members for football in 2018–19 with Louisiana College joining for 2021–22.

On July 1, 2025, North Texas–Dallas left the SAC to become a full member of the Red River Athletic Conference (RRAC), effective immediately for this school year.

=== Chronological timeline ===
- 1978 – The Sooner Athletic Conference (SAC) was founded. Charter members included Bethany Nazarene College (now Southern Nazarene University), Oklahoma Baptist University, Oklahoma Christian University, Phillips University and the University of Science and Arts of Oklahoma (USAO), beginning the 1978–79 academic year.
- 1980 – John Brown University joined the Sooner in the 1980–81 academic year.
- 1983 – John Brown left the Sooner to become an NAIA Independent after the 1982–83 academic year.
- 1986 – Oklahoma City University joined the Sooner in the 1986–87 academic year.
- 1994 – USAO left the Sooner to join the Oklahoma Intercollegiate Conference (OIC) after the 1993–94 academic year.
- 1994 – Lubbock Christian University and Wayland Baptist University joined the Sooner in the 1994–95 academic year.
- 1995 – John Brown rejoined the Sooner in the 1995–96 academic year.
- 1998 – Phillips left the Sooner as the school ceased operations after the 1997–98 academic year.
- 1998 – St. Gregory's University joined the Sooner in the 1998–99 academic year.
- 2000 – USAO rejoined the Sooner in the 2000–01 academic year.
- 2001 – Northwestern Oklahoma State University joined the Sooner in the 2001–02 academic year.
- 2007 – Mid-America Christian University and Rogers State University joined the Sooner in the 2007–08 academic year.
- 2012 – Three institutions left the Sooner and the NAIA to join the Division II ranks of the National Collegiate Athletic Association (NCAA) and to join their respective new home primary conferences, all effective after the 2011–12 academic year:
  - Northwestern Oklahoma State and Southern Nazarene to the Great American Conference (GAC)
  - and Oklahoma Christian to the Heartland Conference
- 2013 – Lubbock Christian and Rogers State left the Sooner and joined the NCAA Division II ranks and the Heartland after the 2012–13 academic year.
- 2013 – Northwood University–Texas, Southwestern Assemblies of God University (now Nelson University), Southwestern Christian University and Texas Wesleyan University joined the Sooner in the 2013–14 academic year.
- 2014 – Northwood–Texas left the Sooner as the school ceased operations after the 2013–14 academic year.
- 2015 – Oklahoma Baptist left the Sooner and the NAIA to join the NCAA Division II ranks and the GAC after the 2014–15 academic year.
- 2015 – Bacone College joined the Sooner in the 2015–16 academic year.
- 2016 – The University of Houston–Victoria (UHV; now Texas A&M University–Victoria), the University of the Southwest and the University of St. Thomas joined the Sooner as associate members for women's golf in the 2017 spring season (2016–17 academic year).
- 2017 – Central Christian College of Kansas and Oklahoma Panhandle State University joined the Sooner in the 2017–18 academic year.
- 2017 – Indiana Institute of Technology (Indiana Tech) and Lourdes University joined the Sooner as associate members for men's wrestling in the 2017–18 academic year.
  - the University of Houston–Victoria (UHV), the University of the Southwest and the University of St. Thomas for women's golf
- 2017 – St. Gregory's (Okla.) left the Sooner as the school announced that it would close at the end of the fall 2017 semester during the 2017–18 academic year.
- 2018 – Langston University joined the Sooner in the 2018–19 academic year.
- 2018 – Five institutions joined the Sooner as associate members, all effective in the 2018–19 academic year:
  - Arizona Christian University, Lyon College, Ottawa University–Arizona and Texas College for football
  - and Rochester College (later Rochester University, now Rochester Christian University) for men's wrestling
- 2019 – Bacone left the Sooner to become an NAIA Independent as part of the Association of Independent Institutions (AII) after the 2018–19 academic year.
- 2019 – Houston–Victoria (UHV) and Southwest (N.Mex.) left the Sooner as an associate member for women's golf after the 2019 spring season (2018–19 academic year).
- 2019 – St. Thomas (Tex.) left the Sooner as an associate member for women's golf, as the school announced to move up to the NCAA Division III ranks and the Southern Collegiate Athletic Conference (SCAC) after the 2019 spring season (2018–19 academic year).
- 2019 – Three institutions joined the Sooner as associate members (and/or added other single sports into their affiliate memberships), both effective in the 2019–20 academic year:
  - Cleary University for men's wrestling
  - and Lyon and Waldorf University for women's wrestling
- 2020 – Five institutions left the Sooner as associate members (and/or removed other single sports from their affiliate memberships), all effective after the 2019–20 academic year:
  - Cleary, Indiana Tech, Lourdes and Rochester Christian for men's wrestling
  - and Waldorf for women's wrestling
- 2020 – The University of North Texas at Dallas (a.k.a. North Texas–Dallas or UNT Dallas) joined the Sooner as a provisional (associate) member for some sports in the 2020–21 academic year.
- 2021 – North Texas–Dallas (UNT Dallas) has upgraded as a full (active) member within the Sooner for all sports in the 2021–22 academic year.
- 2021 – Arkansas Baptist College and Louisiana College (now Louisiana Christian University) joined the Sooner as associate members for football in the 2021 fall season (2021–22 academic year).
- 2022 – Jarvis Christian College (now Jarvis Christian University) joined the Sooner as an associate member for men's and women's wrestling in the 2022–23 academic year.
- 2023 – Two institutions left the Sooner and the NAIA as associate members for football, both effective after the 2022 fall season (2022–23 academic year):
  - Lyon to join the NCAA Division III ranks as an NCAA Division III independent schools (while they now currently compete in the Southern Collegiate Athletic Conference (SCAC), beginning in the 2024 fall season) for that sport
  - and Arizona Christian to join the Frontier Conference for that sport
- 2023 – Arkansas Baptist and North American University joined the Sooner as associate members for football in the 2023 fall season (2023–24 academic year).
- 2024 – The College of the Ozarks (CofO) joined the Sooner in the 2024–25 academic year.
- 2025:
  - North American left the Sooner as an associate member for football after the 2024 fall season (2024–25 academic year), as the school announced it would discontinue its football program.
  - North Texas–Dallas left the Sooner to join the Red River Athletic Conference (RRAC) after the 2024–25 academic year.
- 2028 – Texas Wesleyan will leave the Sooner and the NAIA to join the NCAA Division II ranks and the Lone Star Conference (LSC), effective after the 2027–28 academic year, pending NCAA approval.

== Member schools ==
=== Current members ===
The Sooner currently has 12 full members, all but three are private schools:

Institution	Location	Founded	Affiliation	Enrollment	Nickname	Joined (Note: Represents the calendar year when fall sports competition begins.)
Central Christian College of Kansas	McPherson, Kansas	1884	Free Methodist	455	Tigers	2017
John Brown University	Siloam Springs, Arkansas	1919	Interdenominational	2,341	Golden Eagles	1980; 1995 (Note: John Brown left the SAC after the 1982–83 school year; before rejoining in the 1995–96 school year.)
Langston University	Langston, Oklahoma	1897	Public (HBCU)	1,910	Lions	2018
Mid-America Christian University (MACU)	Oklahoma City, Oklahoma	1953	Church of God	2,183	Evangels	2007
Nelson University (Note: Formerly known as Southwestern Assemblies of God University prior to 2024.)	Waxahachie, Texas	1927	Assemblies of God	1,725	Lions	2013
Oklahoma City University	Oklahoma City, Oklahoma	1904	United Methodist	2,763	Stars	1986
Oklahoma Panhandle State University	Goodwell, Oklahoma	1909	Public	1,071	Aggies	2017
College of the Ozarks (Note: This institution holds dual membership with the National Christian College Athletic Association (NCCAA).)	Point Lookout, Missouri	1906	Non-denominational	1,427	Bobcats	2024
University of Science and Arts of Oklahoma (USAO)	Chickasha, Oklahoma	1908	Public	914	Drovers	1978; 2000 (Note: USAO left the SAC after the 1993–94 school year; before rejoining in the 2000–01 school year.)
Southwestern Christian University	Bethany, Oklahoma	1946	Pentecostal	364	Eagles	2013
Texas Wesleyan University	Fort Worth, Texas	1890	United Methodist	2,595	Rams	2013
Wayland Baptist University	Plainview, Texas	1908	Baptist	2,861	Pioneers	1994

=== Associate members ===
The Sooner currently has six associate members, all private schools:

Institution	Location	Founded	Affiliation	Enrollment	Nickname	Joined (Note: Represents the calendar year when fall sports competition begins.)	Sooner sport	Primary conference
Arkansas Baptist College (Note: Arkansas Baptist competed in the Sooner as an associate member for men's wrestling.)	Little Rock, Arkansas	1884	Baptist	373	Buffaloes	2023	football	Continental
Jarvis Christian University (Note: Formerly known as Jarvis Christian College until 2022.)	Hawkins, Texas	1912	Disciples of Christ (Note: Also a historically black college and university.)	800	Bulldogs	2022^{m.wr.} 2022^{w.wr.}	men's wrestling women's wrestling	Red River (RRAC)
Louisiana Christian University (Note: Formerly known as Louisiana College until late 2021 (during the 2021–22 school year).)	Pineville, Louisiana	1906	Southern Baptist	950	Wildcats	2021	football	Red River (RRAC)
Missouri Baptist University	Creve Coeur, Missouri	1828	Southern Baptist	5,641	Spartans	2019	women's wrestling	American Midwest
Ottawa University–Arizona	Surprise, Arizona	2017	American Baptist	836	Spirit	2018	football	Great Southwest (GSAC)
Texas College	Tyler, Texas	1894	C.M.E. Church (HBCU)	644	Steers	2018	football	Red River (RRAC)

=== Former members ===
The Sooner had 11 former full members, all but three were private schools:

Institution	Location	Founded	Affiliation	Enrollment	Nickname	Joined (Note: Represents the calendar year when fall sports competition begins.)	Left (Note: Represents the calendar year when spring sports competition ends.)	Current conference
Bacone College	Muskogee, Oklahoma	1880	Tribal college (Note: Formerly affiliated with the American Baptist Churches USA (ABCUSA) until 2018.)	N/A	Warriors	2015	2019	Closed in 2024
Lubbock Christian University	Lubbock, Texas	1957	Churches of Christ	1,589	Chaparrals	1994	2013	Lone Star (LSC) (Note: Currently an NCAA Division II athletic conference.)
University of North Texas at Dallas (UNT Dallas)	Dallas, Texas	2000	Public	3,797	Trailblazers	2021	2025	Red River (RRAC)
Northwestern Oklahoma State University	Alva, Oklahoma	1897	Public	1,929	Rangers	2001	2012	Great American (GAC)
Northwood University–Texas	Cedar Hill, Texas	1966	Nonsectarian	N/A	Knights	2013	2014	Closed in 2014
Oklahoma Baptist University	Shawnee, Oklahoma	1910	Baptist	1,526	Bison	1978	2015	Great American (GAC)
Oklahoma Christian University	Oklahoma City, Oklahoma	1950	Churches of Christ	2,743	Eagles & Lady Eagles	1978	2012	Lone Star (LSC)
Phillips University	Enid, Oklahoma	1906	Disciples of Christ	N/A	Haymakers	1978	1998	Closed in 1998
Rogers State University	Claremore, Oklahoma	1909	Public	3,206	Hillcats	2007	2013	Mid-America (MIAA)
St. Gregory's University	Shawnee, Oklahoma	1875	Catholic (Benedictines)	N/A	Cavaliers	1998	2018 (Note: Closed at the end of the fall 2017 semester (2017–18 school year).)	Closed in 2017
Southern Nazarene University	Bethany, Oklahoma	1899	Nazarene	2,165	Crimson; Storm	1978	2012	Great American (GAC)

=== Former associate members ===
The Sooner had 13 former associate members, all but two are private schools:

Institution	Location	Founded	Affiliation	Enrollment	Nickname	Joined (Note: Represents the calendar year when fall sports competition begins.)	Left (Note: Represents the calendar year when spring sports competition ends.)	Sooner sport	Current conference
Arizona Christian University	Glendale, Arizona	1960	Nondenominational	1,233	Firestorm	2018	2023	football	Great Southwest (GSAC)
Arkansas Baptist College (Note: Arkansas Baptist remains in the Sooner as an associate member for football.)	Little Rock, Arkansas	1884	Baptist	373	Buffaloes	2021	2022	men's wrestling	Continental
Cleary University	Howell, Michigan	1883	Nonsectarian	1,040	Cougars	2019	2020	men's wrestling	Wolverine–Hoosier (WHAC)
University of Houston–Victoria (UHV) (Note: Currently known as Texas A&M University–Victoria since September 1, 2025.)	Victoria, Texas	1973	Public (UH System; until 2025)	3,784	Jaguars	2016	2019	women's golf	Red River (RRAC)
Indiana Institute of Technology	Fort Wayne, Indiana	1930	Nonsectarian	2,862	Warriors	2017	2020	men's wrestling	Wolverine–Hoosier (WHAC)
Lourdes University	Sylvania, Ohio	1958	Catholic	1,014	Gray Wolves	2017	2020	men's wrestling	Wolverine–Hoosier (WHAC)
Lyon College	Batesville, Arkansas	1872	Presbyterian (PCUSA)	584	Scots	2018^{fb.}, 2019^{w.wr.}	2023^{fb.}, 2023^{w.wr.}	football, women's wrestling	St. Louis (SLIAC) (Note: Currently an NCAA Division III athletic conference.)
North American University	Stafford, Texas	2007	Private	923	Stallions	2023 (Note: Did not count as an affiliate in conference play until the 2024 fall season.)	2025 (Note: Discontinued its football program on February 10, 2025.)	football	Red River (RRAC)
University of North Texas at Dallas (UNT Dallas)	Dallas, Texas	2000	Public	3,797	Trailblazers	2020	2021	men's basketball, women's basketball, men's cross country, women's cross country	Red River (RRAC)
Rochester Christian University (Note: Formerly known as Rochester University until 2024 and Rochester College until 2019.)	Rochester Hills, Michigan	1959	Churches of Christ	1,173	Warriors	2018	2020	men's wrestling	Wolverine–Hoosier (WHAC)
University of St. Thomas	Houston, Texas	1947	Catholic	3,813	Celts	2016	2019	women's golf	Southern (SCAC)
University of the Southwest	Hobbs, New Mexico	1956	Nondenominational	1,034	Mustangs	2016	2019	women's golf	Red River (RRAC)
Waldorf University	Forest City, Iowa	1903	For-profit (Note: Formerly affiliated with the Evangelical Lutheran Church in America (ELCA) until 2010.)	2,657	Warriors	2019	2020	women's wrestling	Great Plains (GPAC)

=== Membership timeline ===
Full member (all sports) Full member (non-football) Associate member (football-only) Associate member (sport)
