= Atticus Greene Haygood =

American bishop (1839–1896)

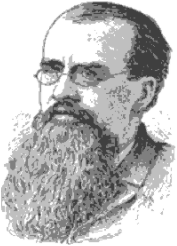

President of Emory College
- In office 1875–1884

Personal details
- Born: November 19, 1839 Watkinsville, Georgia
- Died: January 19, 1896 (aged 56) Oxford, Georgia
- Occupation: Clergyman

Atticus Greene Haygood (1839–1896) was an American bishop of the Methodist Episcopal Church, South. He edited the Wesleyan Christian Advocate, served as president of Emory College, and wrote several publications.

== Biography ==
Atticus Greene Haygood was born in Watkinsville, Georgia on November 19, 1839, and graduated at Emory College in 1859. He entered the ministry where he edited the Sunday-school publications of the Southern branch of the church. He edited the Wesleyan Christian Advocate (1878–82), served as president of Emory (1876–1884), and was a General Agent of the Slater Fund, which assisted educational institutions for African Americans following Reconstruction.

Haygood declined an election as Bishop of the Methodist Episcopal Church, South, in 1882; but he accepted another election in 1890. Rev. T. H. Tyson established a newspaper for African Americans in Oklahoma in 1890 called Our Brother in Black, after one of Haygood's texts. Perhaps his most enduring legacy comes from his famous "New South" sermon, preached on Thanksgiving Day in Old Church, Oxford Georgia. During the bitterness and hardships following the Civil War, Haygood called for a "New South," emphasizing "Let us stand by what is good and make it better if we can." Published in written form, Haygood's sermon text found a wide audience throughout the country, including in the North. One prominent New York businessman, George Seney, was so moved by Haygood's message that he donated money to Emory College, facilitating the construction of Seney Hall, one of Emory University's most historic buildings.

Atticus Greene Haygood died in Oxford, Georgia on January 19, 1896. Haygood Hall, a dormitory at Oxford College of Emory University, is named for him. The neighboring United Methodist Church is Haygood Memorial of Atlanta, named for Bishop A. G. Haygood. He is also the namesake of the Haygood Seminary, a former CME Church seminary in Arkansas.

== Works ==
- Our children (1876)
- Our Brother in Black; his freedom and his future (1881)
- Speeches and Sermons (1884)
- Pleas for Progress (1889)
- Jackknife and Brambles (1893)
- The Monk and the Prince (1895)
- "The black shadow in the South"
- "Agriculture, immigration, and the negro" (1896)

== See also ==
- List of bishops of the United Methodist Church
