= Tania D. Mitchell =

Student development specialist

- Born: 1974 (age 51–52); San Antonio, Texas, USA

Academic background
- Education: BA, political science and communications, Baylor University; MS, higher education and student affairs, Indiana University Bloomington; Ed.D., student development, 2005, University of Massachusetts
- Thesis: Service-learning and social justice: making connections, making commitments (2005)

Academic work
- Institutions: University of Minnesota; Stanford University; California State University, Monterey Bay

Tania D. Mitchell (born 1974) is a student development specialist. She is an associate professor of Higher Education at the University of Minnesota.

== Early life and education ==
Mitchell was born in 1974. She grew up in San Antonio, Texas, where her family engaged in community work and service. Mitchell earned her Bachelor of Arts degree in political science and communications from Baylor University and her Master's degree in higher education and student affairs from Indiana University Bloomington. She then enrolled at the University of Massachusetts for her Graduate Certificate in feminist studies and Doctor of Education in student development.

== Career ==
Upon receiving her Ed.D., Mitchell became an assistant professor of Service Learning Leadership at California State University, Monterey Bay, where she developed and directed the Student Leadership in Service Learning Program. She joined the faculty at Stanford University in 2007 where she served as the Associate Director for Undergraduate Studies and Director of Service Learning in the Center for Comparative Studies in Race and Ethnicity. In her first year at Stanford, Mitchell published Critical service-learning as social justice education: A case study of the citizen scholars program, which found that a critical service-learning pedagogy, such as The Citizen Scholars Program, encourages students to think and develop commitments to act for social justice. As a result of her academic research, she received the 2011 IARSLCE Early Career Research Award.

Mitchell left Stanford University in 2012 to become an assistant professor at the University of Minnesota's Department of Postsecondary Teaching and Learning. That same year, she co-published Service learning as a pedagogy of whiteness with David M. Donahue and Courtney Young-Law, which examined the normalization of whiteness in service learning. As an assistant professor, she was appointed editor for the Cambridge Handbook of Service Learning and Community Engagement and received an American Association of University Women Fellowship for the 2015–16 academic year. In 2019, she co-edited Black Women and Social Justice Education: Legacies and Lessons with Andrea D. Domingue and Stephanie Y. Evans. In the same year, she received a $35,000 grant from the American Educational Research Association (AERA) to fund a two-day, international workshop for scholars on engaging students in civic purpose throughout the academia

== Selected publications ==
- Service learning as a pedagogy of whiteness (2012)
- Traditional vs. critical service-learning: Engaging the literature to differentiate two models. (2008)
- Critical service-learning as social justice education: A case study of the citizen scholars program. (2007)
