= Dominion Robert Glass =

American college president (1895–1968)

8th President of Texas College
- In office 1931–1961

President of Arkansas–Haygood Industrial College
- In office 1919–1928

Personal details
- Born: April 19, 1892 Houston County, Georgia, U.S.
- Died: October 8, 1968 (aged 76) Tyler, Texas, U.S.
- Resting place: Evergreen Memorial Park Cemetery, Tyler, Texas, U.S.
- Spouses: Myrtle Van Sweatt (m. 1923; died 1932) Willie Lee Dorothy Campbell (m. 1936)

Academic background
- Education: Atlanta University (A.B.); Harvard University; Miles College (LL.D.)

Dominion Robert Glass (April 19, 1892 — October 8, 1968) was an African-American educator, academic administrator, and college president. He was the president of Texas College, a historically black college in Tyler, Texas, from 1931 until 1961. He also went by the name D. R. Glass.

== Early life and education ==
Dominion Robert Glass was born in Houston County, Georgia, on April 19, 1892. His mother, Minnie (née Callaway), was a homemaker, and his father, Benjamin Glass, was a preacher.

He studied at Atlanta University (now Clark Atlanta University; A.B. 1917), followed by graduate studies at Harvard University, and a doctorate degree from Miles College (LL.D. 1946).

== Career ==
He began his career in 1917, as the principal at Jackson High School in Jackson, Georgia; and at the same time teaching sociology and economics courses at Paine College in Augusta, Georgia. The following year in 1918, he became the dean of Paine College the following year. In 1919, he became the president of Arkansas–Haygood Industrial College in Pine Bluff, Arkansas.

In 1928, he moved with his first wife to Texas and became the registrar for Prairie View State Normal and Industrial College (now Prairie View A&M University).

From 1931 until 1961, Glass was the 8th president of Texas College, a historically black college affiliated with the Christian Methodist Episcopal Church in Tyler, Texas. During his time as the college's president he grew the student body and faculty; from 1931 to 1961, he grew the student enrollment from 233 students to 2,274 students, and grew the faculty from 10 to 100. Glass was able to gain various accreditations for the school during his tenure including the Texas Education Agency (as a "Standard Senior College"), and by the Southern Association of Colleges and Schools (as "A" rated). He also connected the college to the United Negro College Fund (UNCF) at the time of its inception in 1944. When he retired in 1961, the college’s board of directors awarded him the title of professor emeritus.

== Death and legacy ==
He died on October 8, 1968, in Tyler, Texas. He is the namesake of the D.R. Glass Library at Texas College; the building listed on the National Register of Historic Places since 2007.

== Personal life ==
From May 28, 1923, until June 23, 1932, Glass was married to Myrtle Van Sweatt, which ended with her death. On August 10, 1936, in Tyler, Texas, he remarried to Willie Lee Dorothy Campbell, a noted educator. His second wife died on May 2, 1999, many years after his death.
