= D.R. Glass Library =

- D.R. Glass Library at Texas College
- U.S. National Register of Historic Places
- Dominion Robert Glass Library
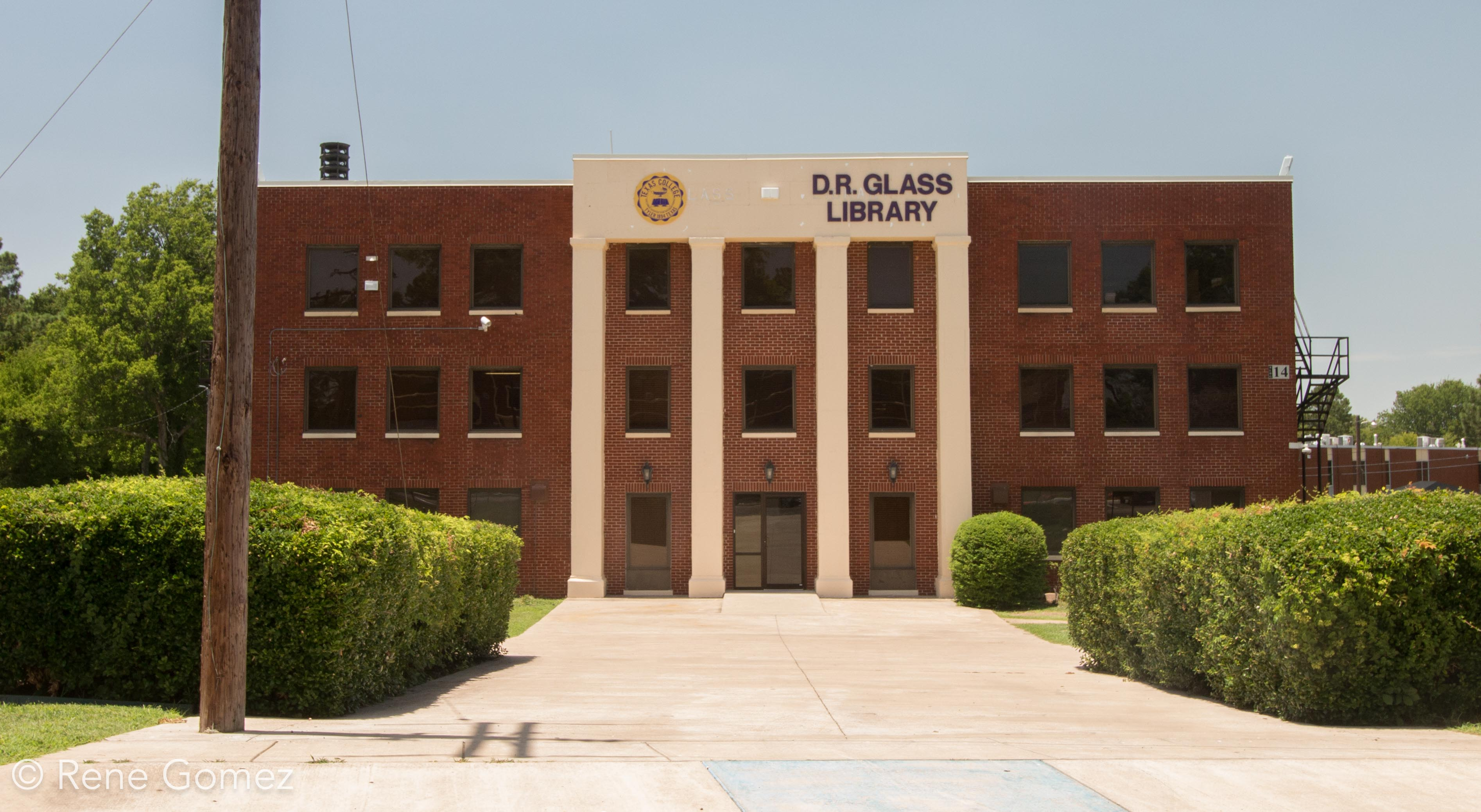

- Location within Texas Location within the United States
- Location: 2404 North Grand Avenue, Tyler, Texas, U.S.
- Coordinates: 32.373611°N 95.312222°W
- Built: 1948
- Architect: McKissack & McKissack
- Architectural style: Classical Revival
- Part of: Texas College
- NRHP reference No.: 07000128
- Added to NRHP: March 7, 2007

The D.R. Glass Library, or Dominion Robert Glass Library, is a historic building and academic library built in 1948, and located at the Texas College campus at 2404 North Grand Avenue, Tyler, Texas. It is listed on the National Register of Historic Places since March 7, 2007.

== History ==
The D.R. Glass Library is part of Texas College, a historically black college, and was it designed by McKissack & McKissack, one of the oldest black-founded and owned architecture firms. The building was named after the former college president, Dominion Robert Glass (1895–1968). It is part of the HBCU Library Alliance.

McKissack & McKissack also designed the President's House at Texas College (1942), another NRHP listed building.

== See also ==
- National Register of Historic Places listings in Smith County, Texas
