= Haas Center for Public Service =

Coordinates: 37.422531°N 122.167436°W

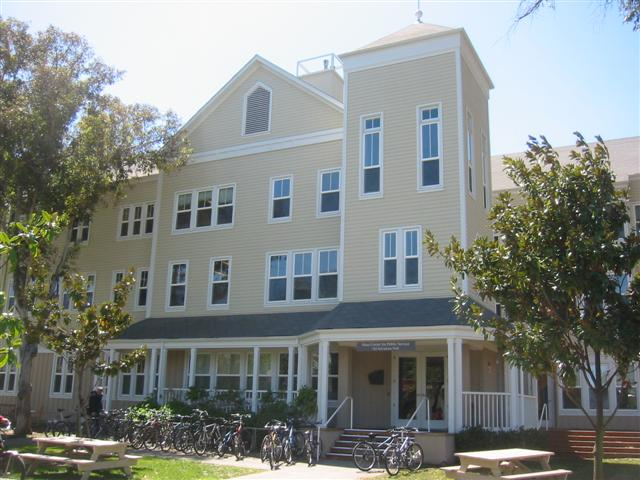
Exterior view of Haas Center for Public Service

The Haas Center for Public Service, formerly the Stanford Public Service Center, is the public service center on the campus of Stanford University in Stanford, California.

The Haas Center houses many student organizations and projects, including the Stanford Volunteer Network, the Ravenswood-Stanford Tutoring Program, and the Mimi and Peter E. Haas Distinguished Visitor Program. Haas Center programs place more than 2,000 students annually in community service projects.

The mission of the center is to "connect academic study with community and public service to strengthen communities and develop effective public leaders. The Center aspires to develop aware, engaged and thoughtful citizens who contribute to the realization of a more just and humane world."

== History ==
In 1984, the original Public Service Center was established by Stanford University President Donald Kennedy. The original Center was located in Owen House.

In 1989, the Public Service Center was renamed the Haas Center for Public Service after $5 million contribution by the Haas family to the center's endowment. The Haas family are descendants of Walter A. Haas, former President of Levi Strauss & Co.

In 1993, construction was completed on a new $3.3 million facility. All public service offices were moved from Owen House to the new 14,000-square-foot (1,300 m^{2}), three-story building, where they are still located today.
