= Texas College =

Historically Black college in Tyler, Texas, US

- Former name: Phillips University (1909–1912)
- Motto: Per lumen scientiae viam invenient populi (Latin)
- Motto in English: "Give The People Light, and They Will Find Their Way"
- Type: Private historically black college
- Established: 1894; 132 years ago
- Religious affiliation: Christian Methodist Episcopal Church
- Academic affiliations: CIC; UNCF
- Endowment: $8.2M (2021)
- President: SherRhonda Gibbs
- Students: 644
- Location: Tyler, Texas, U.S. 32.3756°N 95.3124°W
- Colors: Purple and gold
- Nickname: Steers
- Sporting affiliations: NAIA – RRAC (primary); NAIA – Sooner (football)
- Mascot: Steers
- Website: texascollege.edu

Texas College is a private Christian historically black college in Tyler, Texas, United States. It is affiliated with the United Negro College Fund. It was founded in 1894 by a group of ministers affiliated with the Christian Methodist Episcopal (CME) Church, a predominantly black denomination, which was at the time known as the Colored Methodist Episcopal Church in America. They planned to provide for education of African-American students, who were excluded from the segregated university system of Texas. They planned a full literary, scientific, and classical education for theology, normal training of lower-school teachers, music, commercial and industrial training, and agricultural and mechanical sciences.

== History ==
On January 9, 1894, Texas College was founded by a group of ministers affiliated with the Christian Methodist Episcopal Church, a black denomination. They planned a full, co-educational college to serve people in East Texas.

On June 12, 1909, the name of the college was changed from Texas College to Phillips University. It was named for Bishop Henry Phillips and his leadership. The name reversal occurred in 1910 at the Third Annual Conference of the church. In May 1912, the college was officially renamed Texas College. The subsequent years of the college were spent with refinements and enhancements of the educational enterprise.

In 1948, the D.R. Glass Library was built and designed by McKissack & McKissack, and it is a NRHP-listed building.

The Articles of Incorporation reflect such efforts with modifications and amendments during periods 1909 to 1966. The college today is open to all individuals without discrimination on the grounds of national origin, race, religion, or sex. It is authorized to offer instruction in the areas of arts and sciences, humanities, natural sciences, social sciences, preparation of teachers, and the provision of instructional supports, to those in pursuit of an education.

== List of presidents ==
- Rev. O. T. Womack (1895–1903)
- W. B. West (1903–1905)
- S. W. Broome (1905–1910)
- George L. Tyus (1910–1914)
- C. C. Neal (1914–1915)
- Willette R. Banks (1915–1926)
- C. C. Owens (1926–1931)
- Dominion Robert Glass (1931–1961)
- R. L. Potts (1961–1963)
- B. W. Doyle (1963–1964)
- H. C. Savage (1964–1967)
- A. C. Hancock (1967–1980)
- J. E. Clark (1980–1985)
- J. P. Jones (1985–1986)
- D. H. Johnson (1986–1990)
- M. S. Cherry (1990–1992)
- A. C. Mitchell Patton (1992–1994)
- Ronald McKinley Cunningham (1994, interim president)
- Haywood L. Strickland (1994–2000),
- Billy C. Hawkins (2000–2007),
- Willie C. Champion (2007-2008 Interim)
- Dwight J. Fennell (2008–present)

== Academics ==
Texas College offers bachelor's degree programs in biology, business administration, criminal justice, computer science, English, interdisciplinary studies (teacher certification), mathematics, music, liberal studies, religion, social work, and sociology. Also available are associate of arts degrees in early childhood education and general studies, as well as a post-baccalaureate alternative certification teacher education program for people with bachelor's degrees.

According to the US Department of Education's College Scorecard, the college has a 24% graduation rate, defined as the percentage of students who graduate within eight years of their first enrollment at the college. This rate compares to the median average of 58% graduation rate for US four-year colleges overall.

== Athletics ==
The Texas College athletic teams are called the Steers. The college is a member of the National Association of Intercollegiate Athletics, primarily competing in the Red River Athletic Conference for most of their sports since the 1998–99 academic year; its football team competes in the Sooner Athletic Conference (SAC). The Steers previously competed as a founding member of the Southwestern Athletic Conference (SWAC) from 1920–21 to 1961–62, which is currently an NCAA Division I FCS athletic conference.

Texas College competes in 12 intercollegiate varsity sports, Men's sports include baseball, basketball, cross country, football, soccer, and track and field; women's sports include basketball, cross country, soccer, softball, track and field, and volleyball.

Texas College was a member of the SWAC from 1920 to 1961 (41 years). Texas College was the SWAC football champion in 1934, 1935, 1936, and 1942, and three-way champion with Wiley College and Langston University in 1944, finishing the season with a conference record of 5–1 and an overall record of 8–1. The last SWAC football victory was against Prairie View A&M University in 2003 by a score of 21 to 10. Its football team was revived as an official sport in 2004, and competed in the Central States Football League (CSFL). The Texas College football team won two CSFL Conference co-championships in 2005 and 2006. In 2018, the Texas College football team joined the SAC as an associate member.

== Student life ==
=== Residence halls ===
Texas College constructed a new residence hall, the Living and Learning Center, that opened in 2016. Residence halls also include the Daniel and the Maddie A. Fair Residence Hall, which was renovated in 2016, as well.

=== Greek organizations ===
Texas College has eight of the nine National Pan-Hellenic Council organizations on campus.

== Notable alumni ==
Name	Class Year	Notability	Reference(s)
Irma P. Hall	1956	Poet and stage and film actress; nominated and has received NAACP Image Award for best supporting actress for her role in Soul Food. In 2004, won Prixe du Jury from Cannes Film Festival for her performance in The Ladykillers; inducted into the Texas Film Hall of Fame in 2005; co-founder of the Dallas Minority Repertory Theatre	
Jesse W. Jones	1954	Professor of chemistry at Baylor University and a member of the Texas House of Representatives from 1992 to 2006	
Mildred Fay Jefferson	1944	The first black woman to graduate from Harvard Medical School, the first woman to graduate in surgery from Harvard Medical School, and the first woman to become a member of the Boston Surgical Society	
Lenton Malry	1957	The first African American to serve in the New Mexico House of Representatives (1969–1979) and on the Bernalillo County Board of Commissioners (1981–1989)	

== Notable faculty ==
Department	Name	Notability	Reference(s)
Home economics	Willie Lee Dorothy Campbell Glass	American educator, founded the home economics department at the college, married the president of the college, Dominion Robert Glass, in 1936	
Head of the humanities division	Lena Beatrice Morton	American educator and literary scholar, was recipient of the Minnie Stevens Piper Professor Award for excellence in teaching, was a life fellow of the International Institute of Arts and Letters in Switzerland, author of Negro Poetry in America (1925), Farewell to the Public Schools, I'm Glad We Met: A Handbook for Teachers (1952), Man Under Stress (1960), Patterns of Language Usage, My First Sixty Years: Passion for Wisdom (1965), and The Influence of the Sea Upon English Poetry from the Anglo-Saxon to the Victorian Period (1976), graduated from the University of Cincinnati and was a founding member of the school's first African-American Greek organization, Zeta chapter of Delta Sigma Theta sorority, earned her PhD from Case Western Reserve University in 1947, is featured in vol. 6 of African American National Biography, edited by H. L. Gates, Jr. and E. B. Higginbotham	

== See also ==
- Butler College
