= DeRionne P. Pollard =

American academic

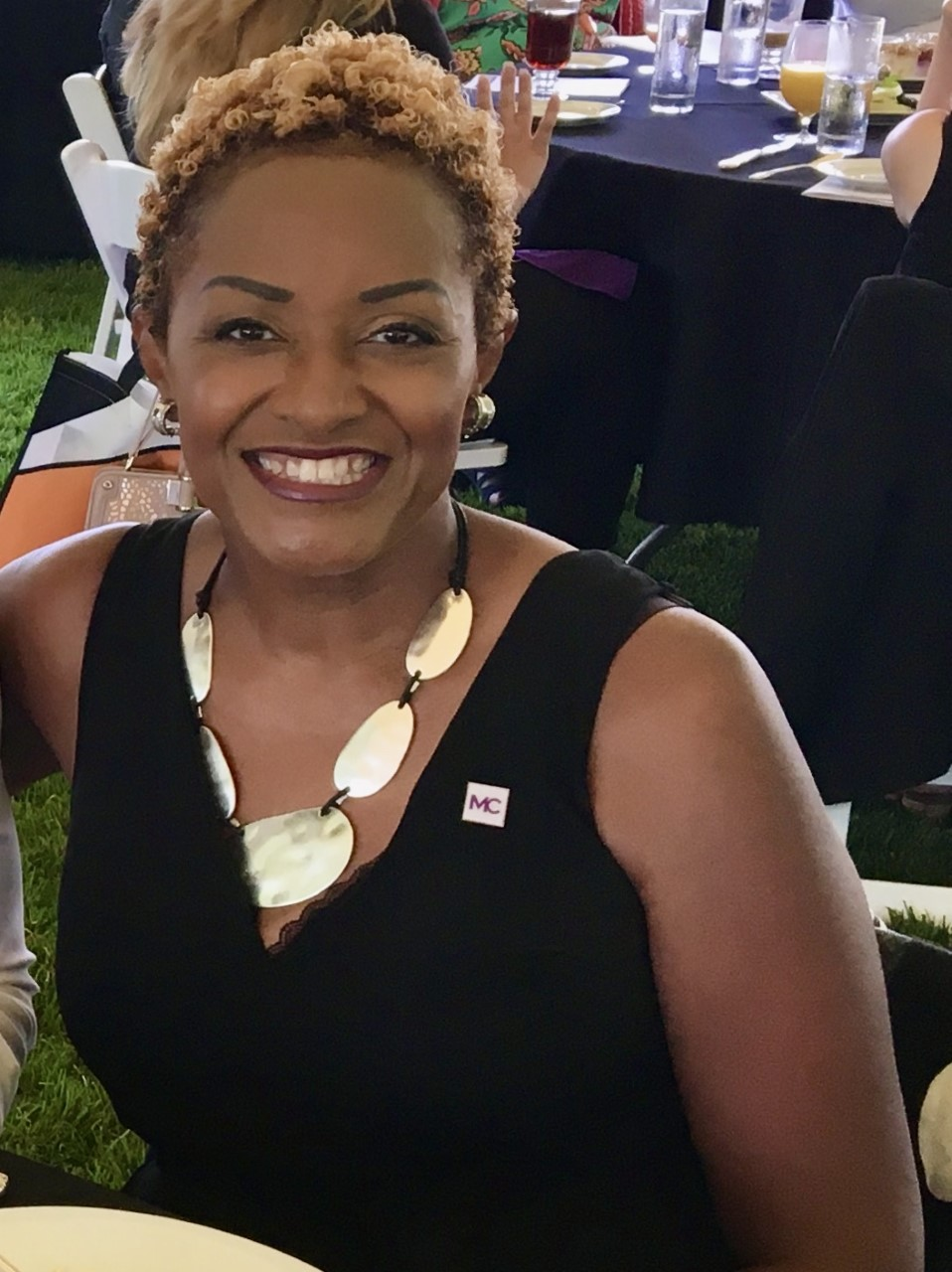

8th President of Nevada State University
- Incumbent
- Assumed office 2021
- Preceded by: Bart Patterson (interim)

9th President of Montgomery College
- In office 2010–2021
- Preceded by: Brian K. Johnson
- Succeeded by: Charlene Dukes (interim)

4th President of Las Positas College
- In office 2008–2010
- Preceded by: Karen Halliday
- Succeeded by: Kevin Walthers

Personal details
- Born: Chicago, Illinois, U.S.
- Education: Iowa State University (BA/MA); Loyola University Chicago (Ph.D)

Academic background
- Thesis: Conversations of consequence: A study of new faculty preparation and acculturation in community colleges (2005)
- Doctoral advisor: Jennifer Grant Haworth

Academic work
- Discipline: Education
- Institutions: College of Lake County; Las Positas College; Montgomery College; Nevada State College

DeRionne P. Pollard is the President of Nevada State University. She previously served as the President of Montgomery College from 2012 to 2021.

== Education and career ==
DeRionne Pollard earned a B.A. and M.A. in English from Iowa State University in 1993 and 1995. In 2005, Dr. Pollard earned a Ph.D. in Educational Leadership and Policy Studies in higher education from Loyola University Chicago.

In 1995, Dr. Pollard began her career as English teacher at the College of Lake County in Lake County, Illinois, before becoming the acting dean of the Communication Arts, Humanities, and Fine Arts Division and later the faculty coordinator for the Center of Excellence in Teaching and Learning and then the vice president of educational affairs. During her tenure of 12 years, she was an instructional designer, instructional dean, assistant Vice President for Educational Affairs, and Vice President for Educational Affairs.

In 2008, she served as president of Las Positas College in Livermore, California. She served on the American Association of Community Colleges’ 21st Century Commission on the Future of Community Colleges and the Commission on Academic, Student, and Community Development. Dr. Pollard is a member of the Community College Advisory Panel at the College Board and the Higher Education Research and Development Institute Advisory Board.

In 2010, Dr. Pollard assumed leadership of Montgomery College, a three-campus community college with 56,000 credit and noncredit students. She spearheaded the development of a new Montgomery College mission and strategic plan. She has partnered actively with Montgomery County Public Schools and the Universities at Shady Grove in the creation of Achieving Collegiate Excellence and Success (ACES), a support program designed to help disadvantaged students transition from high school to college completion. The program now has 1,700 students enrolled. Montgomery College is also a member of Achieving the Dream network, a non-governmental reform movement for student success at community colleges.

Dr. Pollard formerly served on the American Association of Community Colleges’ 21st Century Commission on the Future of Community Colleges and the Commission on Academic, Student, and Community Development. Dr. Pollard is a member of the Equity Advisory Board for Mission Partners and the Center for First-generation Student Success Advisory Board for the National Association of Student Personnel Administrators. She also serves on the board of directors for the American Association of Community Colleges and as the president of the American Association for Women in Community Colleges. Locally, she also serves on the boards of the Montgomery County Chamber of Commerce, Universities at Shady Grove, Leadership Montgomery, the Montgomery County Advisory Board of the Greater Washington Community Foundation, and the Consortium of Universities of the Washington Metropolitan Area.

In April 2021, Dr. Pollard was appointed president of Nevada State University by the Nevada System of Higher Education Board of Regents, becoming the 8th president of the 19-year-old college, as well as the first permanent Black woman President of the institution, and of any Nevada System of Higher Education institution. She began her presidency in August 2021, and is serving a 4-year contract. Dr. Pollard is the first permanent Black woman President of the institution and of any Nevada System of Higher Education institution.

Dr. Pollard announced that she will step down from her role as NSU's President by July 31, 2025

Dr. Pollard transition into a new role and was named President and CEO of the American Association of Community Colleges (AACC) in July 2025

== Awards and accolades ==
Dr. Pollard earned the 2014 Woman of Distinction Award from the National Conference for College Women Student Leaders. Dr. Pollard was named one of Washington's 100 Most Influential Women by Washingtonian Magazine, won a 2017 Academic Leadership Award from the Carnegie Corporation of New York, and was a recipient of a Visionary Award by the Washington Area Women's Foundation. Additionally, she has been honored by Leadership Montgomery, The Daily Record, Bethesda Magazine, and the Washington Business Journal and is a member of Zeta Phi Beta as well as the Silver Spring Chapter of The Links.

The Gazette named her one of 25 CEO's You Need to Know. Dr. Pollard earned the Distinguished Alumni Award from Iowa State University's College of Liberal Arts and Sciences on April 26, 2019.

On June 15, 2021, Craig L. Rice, Will Jawando, and Nancy Navarro, representing the Education & Culture Committee of the Montgomery County Council, presented a Proclamation Honoring Dr. Pollard for her presidential tenure at Montgomery College.

On June 22, 2021, the Montgomery College Board of Trustees unanimously approved a resolution to name the Student Affairs and Science Building at the Germantown Campus as the Dr. DeRionne P. Pollard Student Affairs and Science Building. The board took this action in recognition of Pollard's contributions to significantly enrich students’ educational opportunities and experiences at Montgomery College.

== Background and personal life ==
Dr. Pollard was born in Chicago, Illinois. She grew up in a home that was being financially managed by her father, who later on lost his job and fed his family with government-issued cheese. Her mother died when she was just four years old.

Pollard is married to Robyn Jones, whom she met on their first day of freshman year during a math placement test at Iowa State University. They were married in California, while Pollard was serving as president of Las Positas College in the San Francisco suburbs. Dr. Pollard and Jones have a son together, Myles.
