= Women's Foundation California =

- Purpose: Women's rights
- Key people: Bia Vieira, chief executive officer
- Website: womensfoundca.org

The Women's Foundation California is a nonprofit foundation located in Oakland. It was founded in the 1980s.

== Profile ==
The Women's Foundation California is dedicated to advancing the rights and well-being of women and girls throughout the state of California, particularly those who have been historically underserved. The Foundation focuses its efforts on supporting individuals affected by systemic inequalities tied to economic status,, race or ethnicity, physical or mental ability, culture, religion, sexual orientation, immigration status or regional factors.

The Foundation primarily distributes its resources through a grantmaking program, awarding funds to community-based organizations referred to as Grantee Partners. These partners work on the frontlines of social justice and equity movements within their communities.

== Focus areas ==
The Foundation’s investment strategy centers around four key areas:

- Economic Justice
- Reproductive Health and Sexual rights
- Environment and Women
- Leadership

In addition to grantmaking, the Women's Foundation California engages in advocacy efforts at both local and state levels. By combining financial support with policy work, the Foundation aims to create lasting structural change. Its initiatives have contributed to notable policy achievements in areas such as human trafficking, domestic abuse and sexual violence, reproductive health, economic security and environmental justice.

== See also ==
- Washington Area Women's Foundation
