= Fred Maryanski =

- Born: June 3, 1947
- Died: July 2, 2010 (aged 63); Nathan Adelson Hospice; Las Vegas; Nevada; United States
- Occupation: Educator
- Known for: President of Nevada State College
- Spouse: Karen Maryanski
- Children: David, Peter and Krista

Fred Maryanski (June 3, 1947 – July 2, 2010), an American educator. He was the President of Nevada State College in Henderson, Nevada, part of the Nevada System of Higher Education (NSHE), from February 1, 2005 until his death.

== Education ==
Maryanski had a bachelor's degree from Providence College, a master's degree from Stevens Institute of Technology and a Ph.D. from the University of Connecticut. Besides teaching at UConn he also taught at Kansas State University.

== Career ==
Dr. Maryanski served as interim Provost and Academic Vice-President for Academic Affairs at the University of Connecticut prior to assuming the presidency. He contributed significantly to the creation, development and growth of Nevada State College. Dr. Maryanski was credited with guiding Nevada State College through the final stages of its accreditation process and its 509-acre (2.06 km^{2}) master plan. Under Maryanski's leadership, the college opened its first permanent building on campus. Dr. Maryanski oversaw the college's rapidly rising enrollment en route to transforming it into a respectable and viable institution of higher learning. According to the United States Senator from Nevada, Senate Majority Leader Harry Reid, Maryanski "meant so much to students in Nevada and made Nevada State College the great institution it is today." Dr. Maryanski died at the Nathan Adelson Hospice in Las Vegas on July 2, 2010, after a long battle with cancer. Maryanski was survived by his wife Karen, sons David and Peter, daughter Krista, and three grandchildren.
