= Montgomery College =

Public college in Montgomery County, Maryland, US

- Montgomery College Logo since August 2025
- Former name: Montgomery Junior College
- Motto: Exceptional Education. Extraordinary Outcomes.
- Type: Public community college
- Established: August 20, 1946; 80 years ago
- Accreditation: MSCHE
- Academic affiliations: CUWMA
- President: Jermaine F. Williams
- Students: c. 55,000 credit and noncredit students
- Location: Montgomery County, Maryland, U.S. 39°05′54″N 77°09′33″W
- Campus: Campuses in; Rockville*Germantown*Takoma Park/Silver Spring
- Newspaper: The MC Advocate; The MC Globe; The MC Excalibur
- Colors: Blue, Purple & Silver
- Sporting affiliations: NJCAA Division I
- Mascot: Raptors (since 2012)
- Website: montgomerycollege.edu

Montgomery College (MC) is a public community college in Montgomery County, Maryland, United States. The college has three campuses, the largest of which is in Rockville. Its other campuses are between Takoma Park & Silver Spring and in Germantown. Its off-campus sites include the Business Training Center in Gaithersburg and Westfield South in Wheaton, which are operated by the college's Workforce Development and Continuing Education Division.

The college was founded in 1946 as Montgomery Junior College. Four years later, it absorbed the 57-year-old Bliss Electrical School, which became the junior college's electrical program.

== History ==
=== Bliss School of Electricity ===
The Bliss School of Electricity was a private, for-profit institution which claimed to be the oldest school teaching electricity in the world. Established in 1893 and named after its founder Louis D. Bliss, its first class was held on October 15, 1893, in a single room on the third floor of the Warder Building at Ninth and F streets NW in Washington, D.C. It started as a night class with 26 students, including Thomas E. Robertson, who would later go on to be the United States Commissioner of Patents. The capital investment in the school was $400, representing an advance payment of $20 each from 20 men. During the eight-month session of 1894–1895, about 75 men enrolled and paid $50 of tuition each. In 1895, Charles Francis Jenkins, of motion picture and television fame, enrolled as a student. The school later moved to 219 G Street NW in Washington, D.C.

W. B. Connelly, a 1904 graduate of Bliss, worked for the General Electric Company at Schenectady, N.Y., where he led the inspection of some two miles of switchboards for the Panama Canal. Before going to General Electric, Connelly taught at Bliss; his student Skipwith B. Cole would later become dean of the school's faculty.

=== Move to Takoma Park ===
In July 1908, the Bliss Electrical School bought the four-story North Takoma Hotel and its 4.5 acres of land from Thomas H. Pickford. Located on Takoma Avenue between New York and Chicago Avenues, the hotel had originally been built by Benjamin F. Gilbert in 1892. Bliss intended to remodel the four-story hotel building into space for classes.

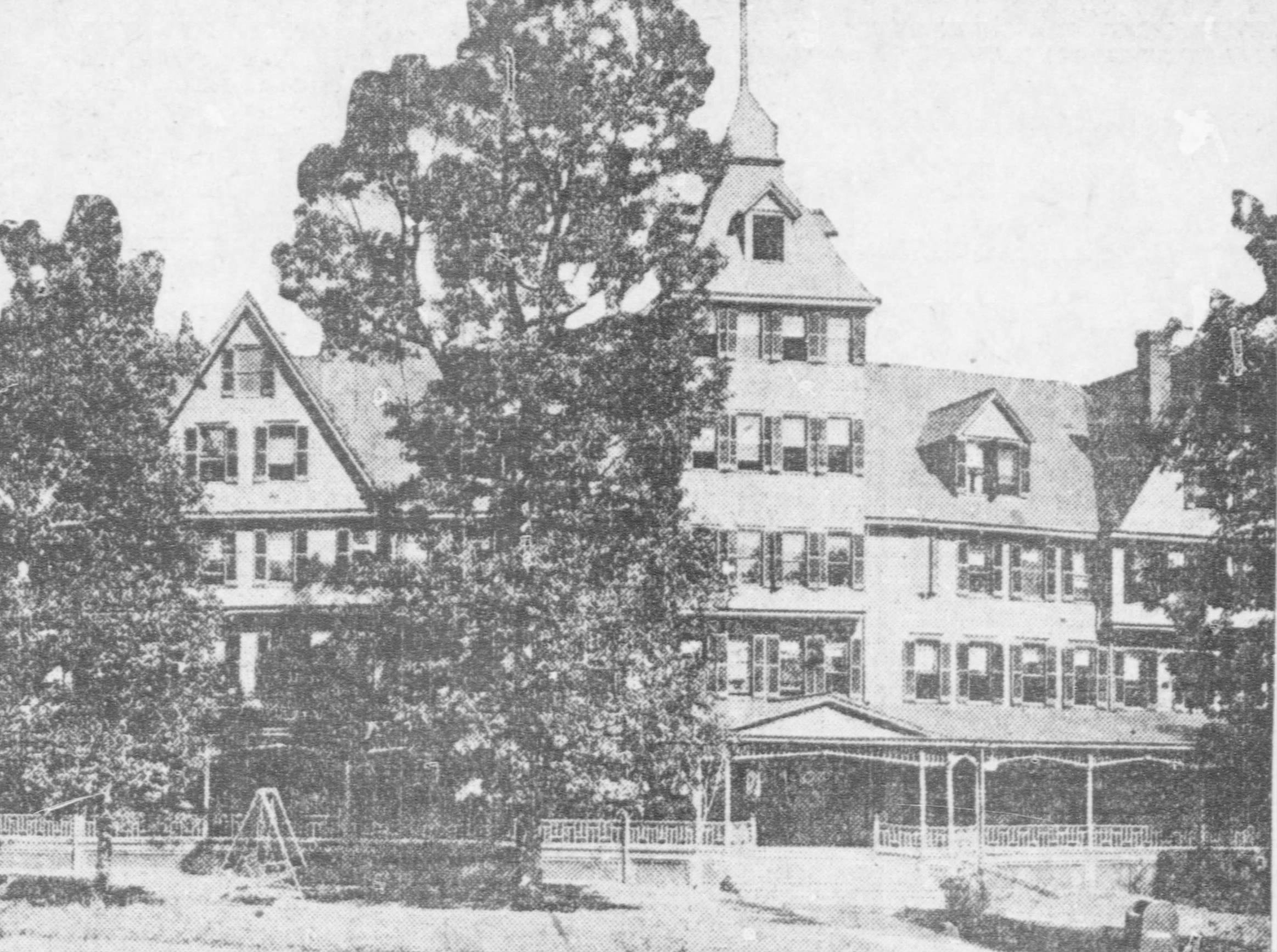
North Takoma Hotel, which was bought by Bliss School of Electricity and used for classes and a dormitory until it burned down in 1908

=== Fire ===
Eight weeks after classes were first held in the new building, the school building burned to the ground around 2:45 A.M. on November 6, 1908. The fire forced almost 200 students in the second floor dormitory to escape the building. As there were no fire escapes, the students climbed out of windows using ropes intended for that purpose. The fire was caused by gas leak in the first-floor kitchen. At the time, Takoma Park did not have a fire station; the closest one was located nearly two miles away in Brightwood.

Afterwards, many Takoma Park residents allowed the students to stay in their homes, many of whom had come from elsewhere in the U.S., Canada, Mexico, Costa Rica, Ecuador, Brazil, and Japan. The City of Takoma allowed the Bliss School to use Takoma Hall for classes temporarily, as did Takoma Park Presbyterian Church. A new two-story building of brick and reinforced concrete was built at the same site, opening for classes in September 1909. A bungalow across the street was acquired to be used as a dining room.

The new Bliss School building, built in 1909 after the previous school building had burned down

On June 3, 1914, Secretary of State William Jennings Bryan addressed the school's graduating class in the auditorium of the Calvary Baptist Church. Bryan said, "No one can set a limit on the growth of the electrical profession. There are greater opportunities for greater discoveries than in any other department of activity. Before you lies a field in which any one of you may be a pioneer."

=== World War I ===
In 1917, the United States entered World War I. By special permission granted by the War Department, the Bliss Electrical School organized a searchlight company of engineers consisting of 57 men from the 1917 class, headed by Lt. Clyde K. Krisee of the faculty, and under Major John C. Gotwals of the U.S. Army Corps of Engineers. This company went overseas with the First Division of the American Expeditionary Forces. These men were used for instruction purposes in a searchlight school in Paris. All returned safely to the United States after the war except one, who was killed in an automobile accident in Paris. The captured German searchlight, which adorns the campus, was presented to the Bliss School of Electricity by the War Department as a tribute to the work of the Bliss Searchlight Company of Engineers.

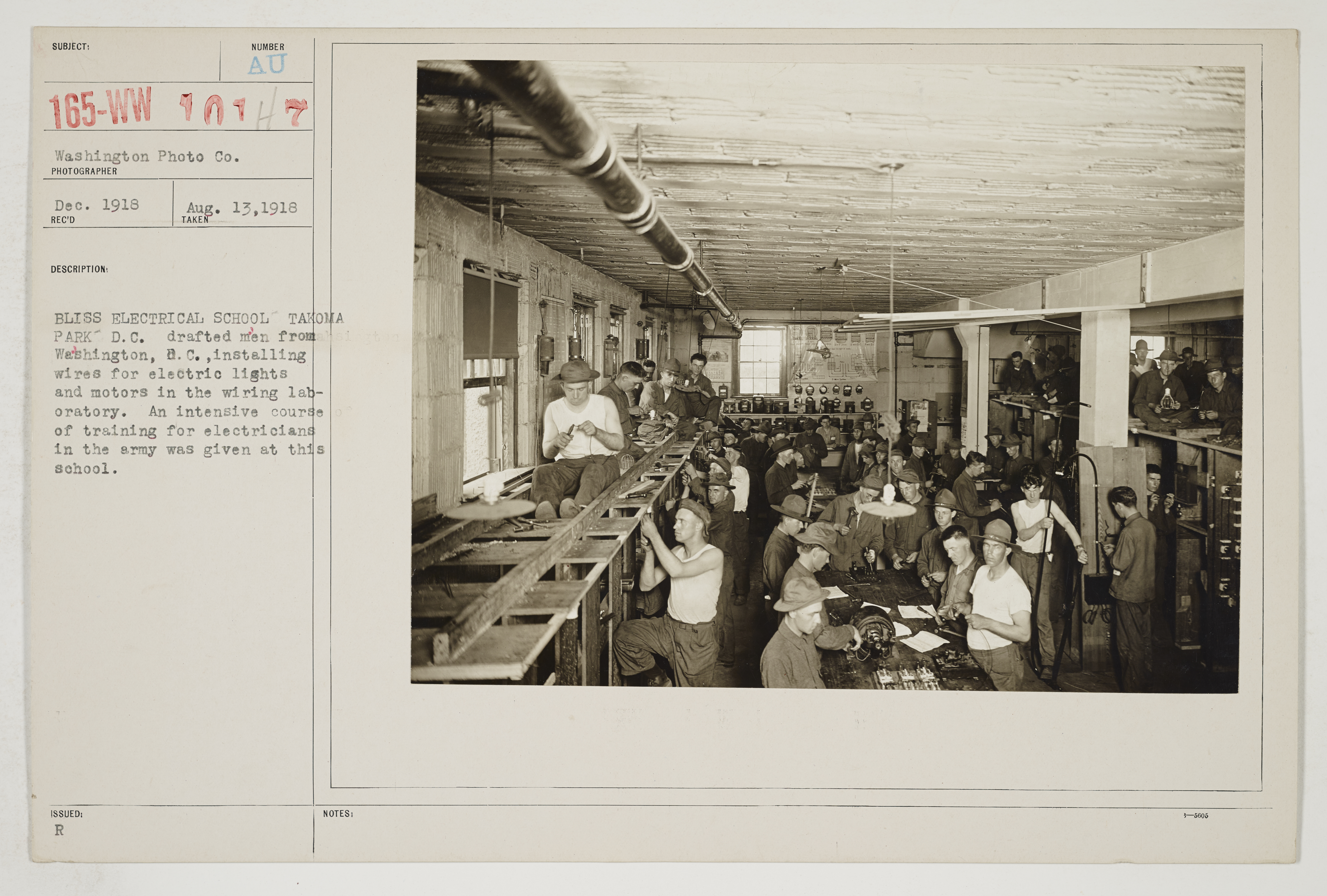
Drafted men from Washington, D.C., install wires for electric lights and motors in the Bliss wiring laboratory in 1918. The school provided an intensive course of training for Army electricians.

At the request of the War Department in 1918, Bliss School prepared an intensive training course in the fundamentals of electricity for drafted men entering the Army. This course was adopted by the War Department, and was the first course used in all the colleges throughout the country, giving instructions along this line to army personnel in the Student Army Training Corps. The school contracted with the War Department to house, feed, and instruct selected groups of soldiers for this course. Beginning June 15, 1918, the school trained 700 soldiers in three detachments. The contract called for training these men at cost. This cost was determined by the auditors in the War Department at $2.00 for the first detachment, at $1.80 for the second detachment, and $1.62 for the third detachment per man per day for housing, feeding, instruction, and supplies. The school was under military control following instruction hence, following the signing of the armistice on November 11, 1918. The third and last detachment of the Student Army Training Corps was mustered out and disbanded on December 6, 1918, and the school was released from military control. In 1919, Bliss returned to civilian training. The first edition of the Bliss School textbook, Theoretical and Practical Electrical Engineering, was published in September 1921.

=== World War II ===
During World War II, the Bliss School was selected by the U.S. Navy as one of six engineering schools to give Primary School in the Electronics Training Program and it graduated over 3,000 students. Bliss Electrical School's building was sold to Montgomery County for $350,000.

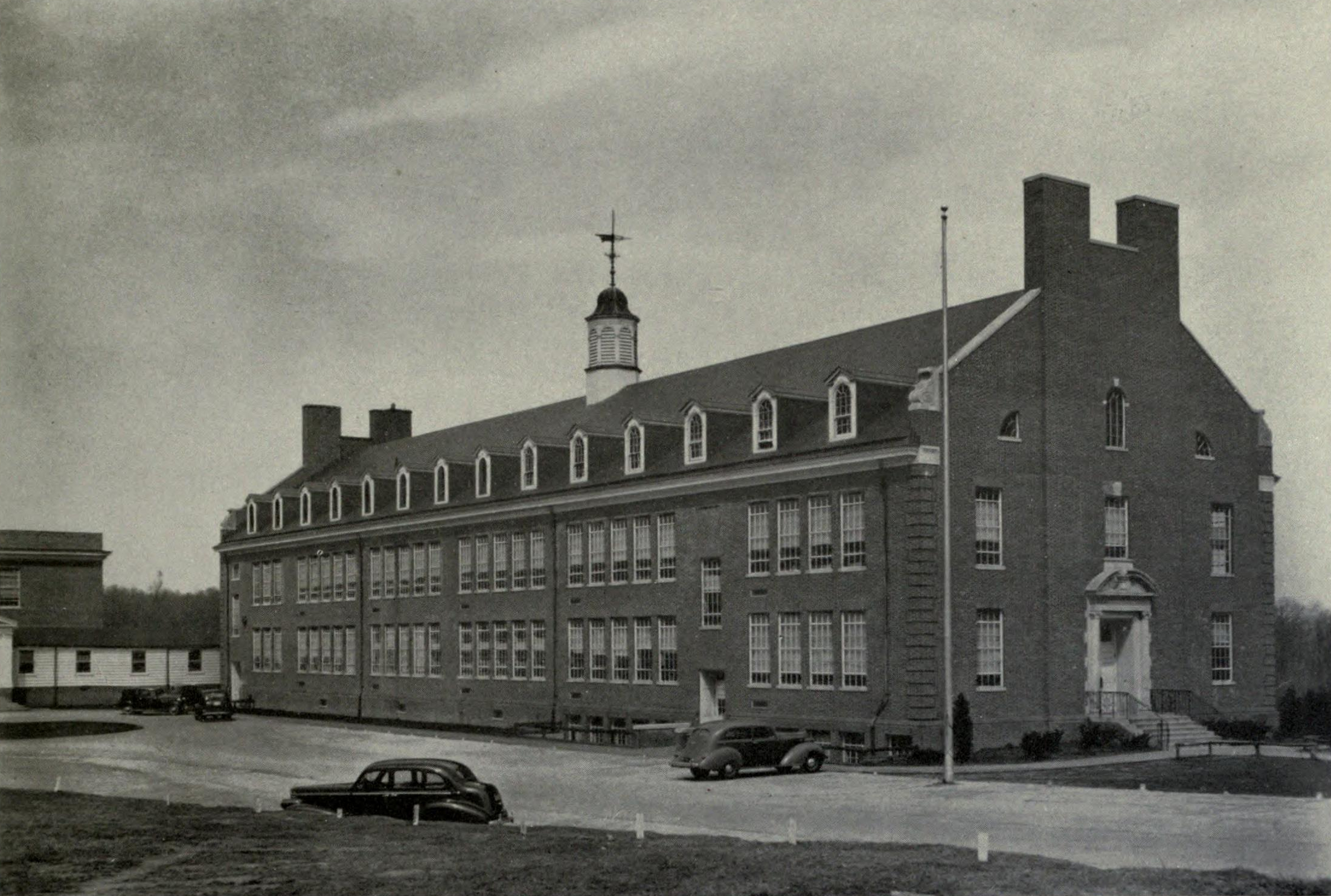
BCC High School where the college started, and which lends its tower to the school crest

=== Montgomery Junior College ===
The current college was organized in 1946 as Montgomery Junior College, with its campus located at the Bethesda-Chevy Chase High School. Its first dean was Hugh G. Price. The first day of class was held on September 16, 1946. During its first school year, it had about 175 students.

In 1950, the college moved to Takoma Park, absorbing the Bliss Electrical School Previously, Montgomery Junior College could only hold evening classes because the high school used the building for its classes during the day, but with the acquisition of Bliss School of Electricity's building, Montgomery Junior College began holding daytime classes as well. The first day of classes at the new location began on October 2, 1950. At the time, it was segregated, with an enrollment of over 500 students. The newly established Carver Junior College in Rockville was expected to have 40 African-Americans enrolled, but only 19 managed to show up, due both to problems in finding transportation to school and the cost of tuition.

Official insignia of Montgomery College

The Rockville campus of Montgomery College opened in September 1965, and the Germantown campus opened in early 1970s, occupying its present permanent site since 1978. Montgomery College also offers learning opportunities through its extensive Workforce Development and Continuing education programs.

The school changed its name from Montgomery Junior College to Montgomery College on July 1, 1969.

=== 21st century ===
In 2010, DeRionne Pollard assumed leadership of Montgomery College and its three campuses. She spearheaded the development of a new Montgomery College mission and strategic plan. She has partnered actively with Montgomery County Public Schools and the Universities at Shady Grove in the creation of Achieving Collegiate Excellence and Success (ACES), a support program designed to help disadvantaged students transition from high school to college completion. The program now has 1,700 students enrolled. Montgomery College is also a member of Achieving the Dream network, a non-governmental reform movement for student success at community colleges.

In 2016, NBC 4 investigated frivolous spending claims made by students and staff against Pollard. NBC 4 had received letters from staff throughout the summer asking the news organization to investigate the president. In response, the school released a statement supporting Pollard and claiming that none of the charges were justified and that there was no inappropriate use of college funds. The matter was dropped.

== Campuses ==
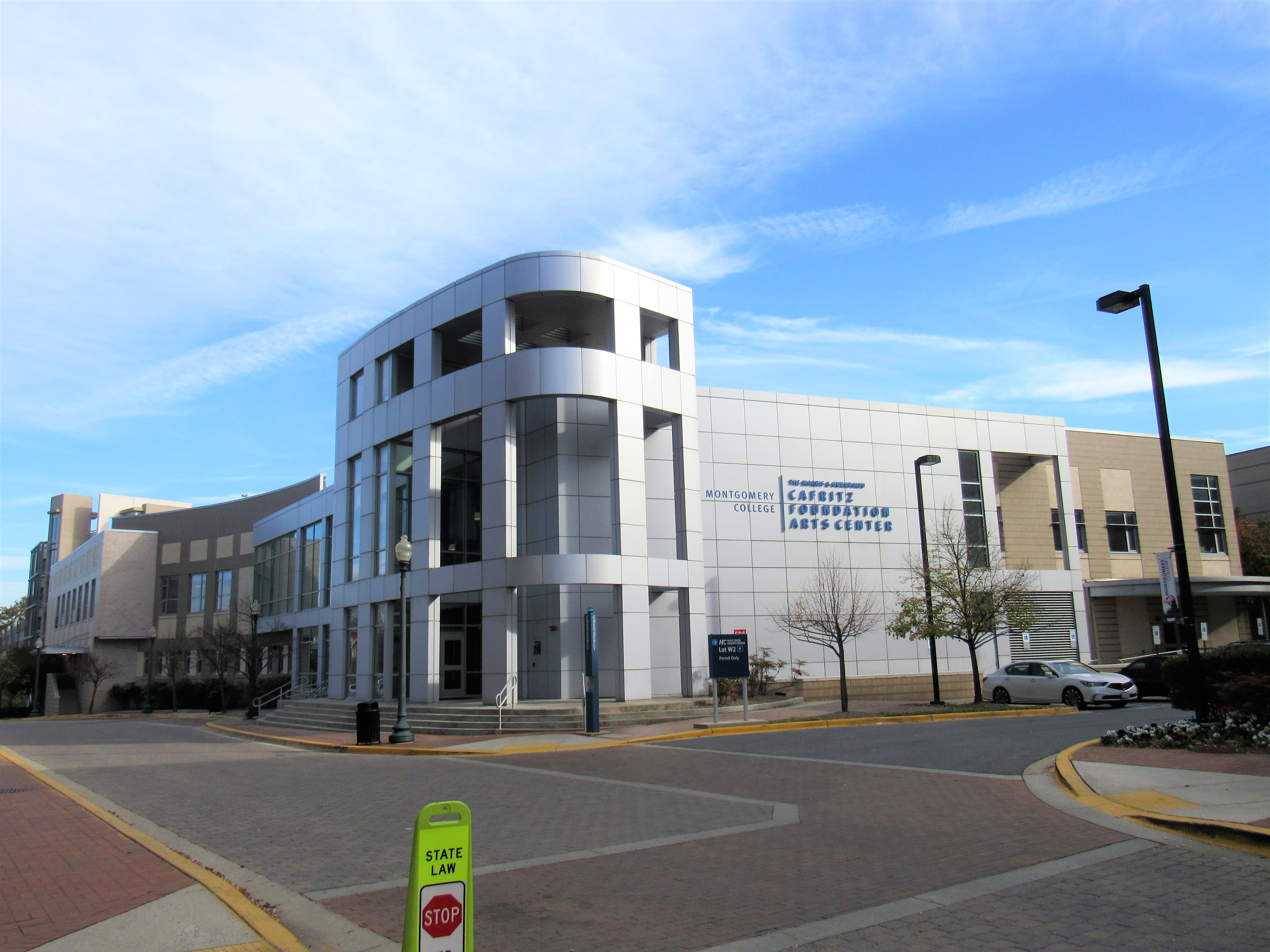
Cafritz Arts Center, Silver Spring

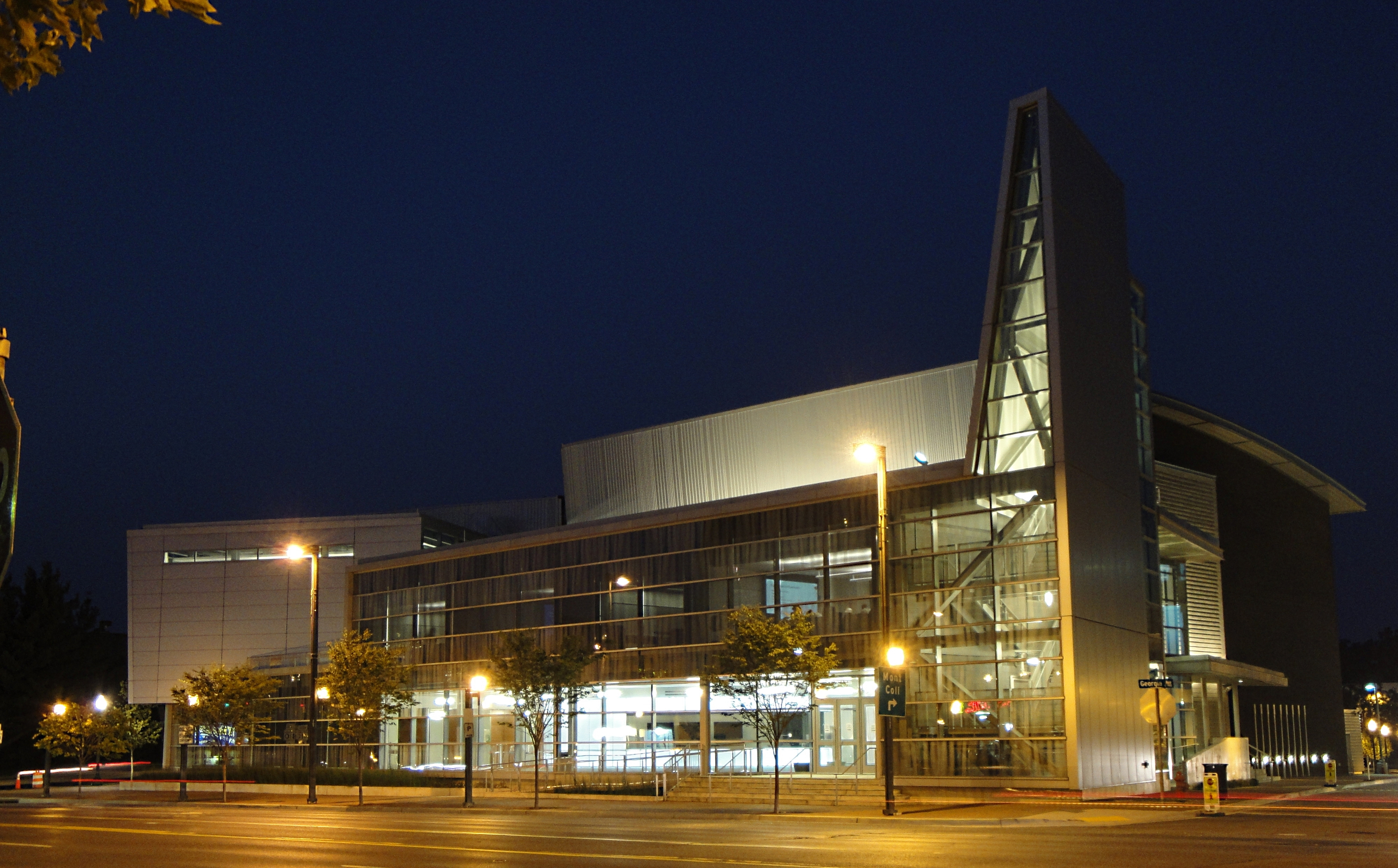
Cultural Arts Center, Silver Spring

=== Takoma Park / Silver Spring ===
The Takoma Park campus began expanding into neighboring city of Silver Spring with the opening of a new Health Sciences Center in January 2004. To reflect the campus's expansion into Silver Spring, the board of trustees renamed the Takoma Park campus as the "Takoma Park/Silver Spring Campus" in June 2005. The campus expansion in Silver Spring included the addition of The Morris and Gwendolyn Cafritz Arts Center which opened in fall 2007. The building houses the campus visual arts programs and the School of Art + Design, formerly the Maryland College of Art and Design, which merged with Montgomery College in September 2004. The Cultural Arts Center, which contains two theaters, opened in 2009. The West Garage, a six-story parking garage with 357 spaces, opened in 2010. On the east side of the campus, a new Student Services Center opened in 2006, the building was later renamed in honor of former college president, Charlene R. Nunley. In 2013, the Commons Building was named in honor of a former faculty member, Catherine F. Scott in appreciation of a $1 million gift she donated to the Montgomery College Foundation. The Commons Building and Pavilion 3 Building underwent comprehensive renovations that were completed in 2010 and 2015 respectively. In 2019, the Falcon Hall and Science South buildings were demolished to make room for a new building, and the Resource Center closed for a major renovation project that is expected to be completed in late January 2025. In September 2024, the college opened the Leggett Math and Science Building a three story building featuring 8 multi-use classrooms, 20 laboratories, a planetarium, a STEM forum, and a greenhouse. The building was named in honor of former Montgomery County Executive, Ike Leggett, and his wife, Catherine.

=== Rockville ===
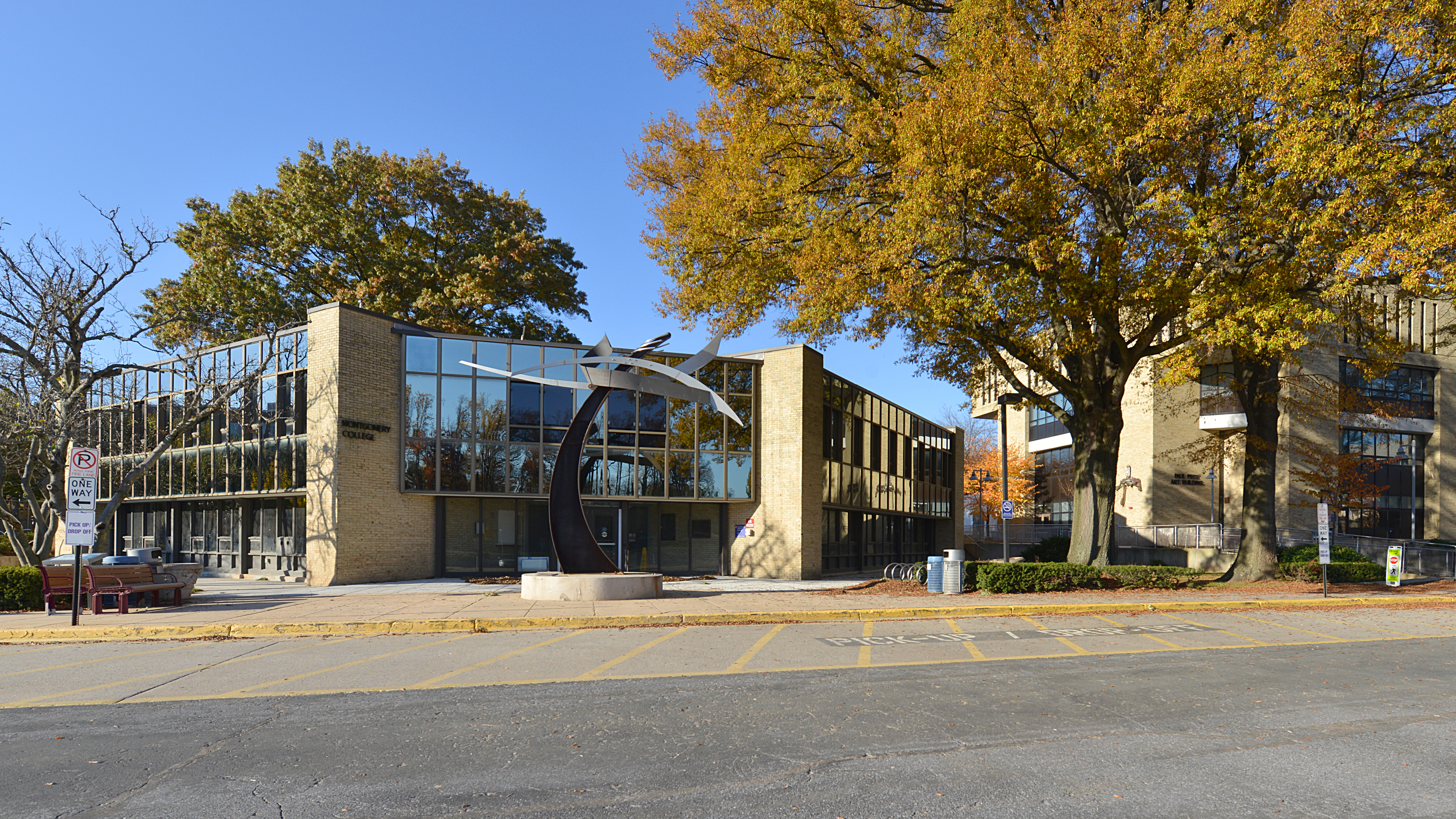
Montgomery College Rockville Campus

In 2008, Montgomery College named its Rockville Campus gallery the Sarah Silberman Art Gallery. In addition to donating $500,000 for its complete renovation, Sarah Silberman funded two endowed scholarships in ceramics and sculpture. In 2011, Montgomery College built its new Science Center on the Rockville Campus which features 29 new laboratories, followed by major renovations of the preexisting Science East and Science West buildings in 2014 and 2017 respectively. In January 2017, the new North Garage with over 900 covered parking spaces was opened on the Rockville campus. In October 2020, a new Student Services Center was completed, allowing the consolidation of student services offices into one building.

=== Germantown ===
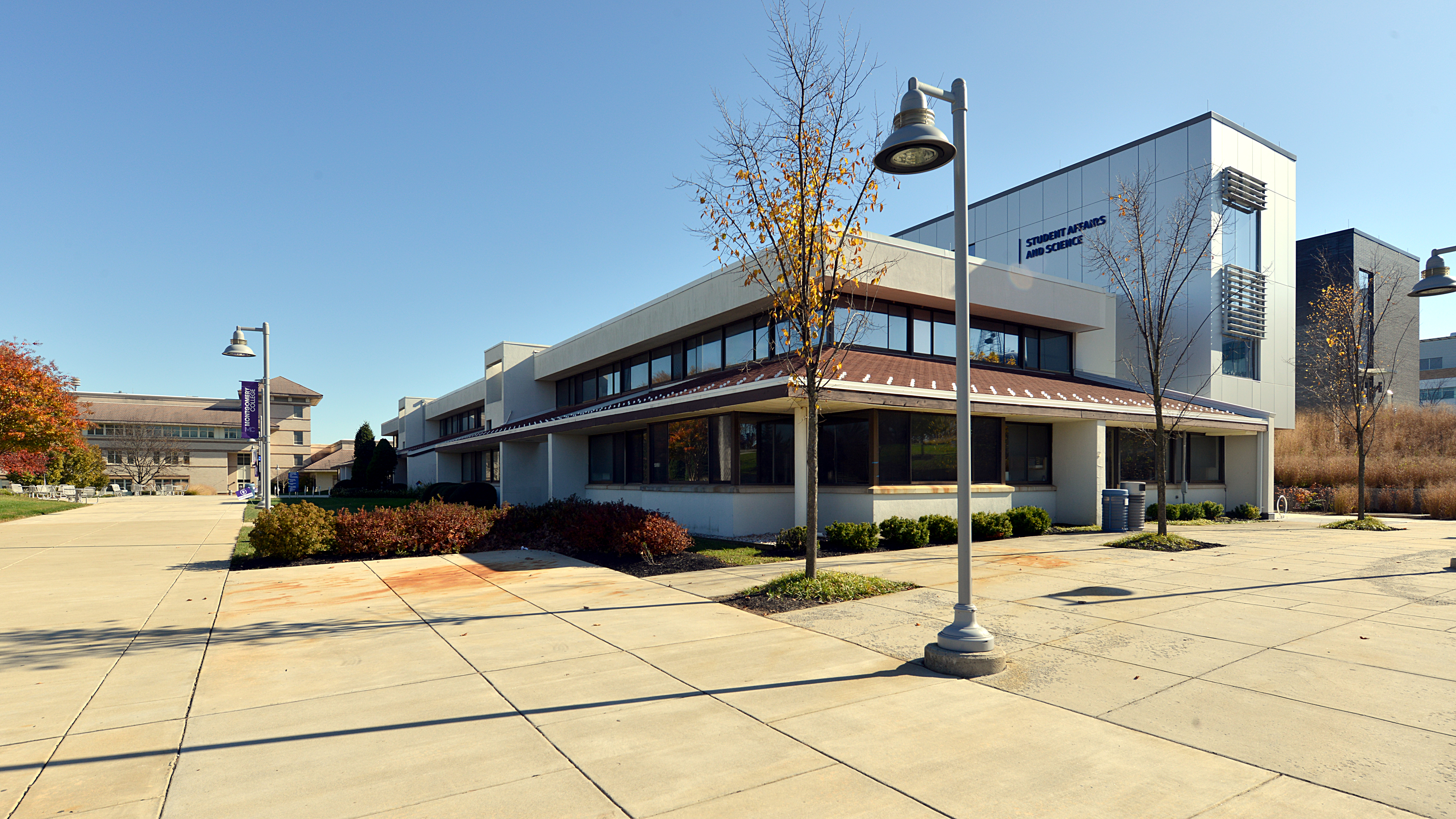
Montgomery College, Germantown campus

In 2011, the Montgomery College Germantown Campus started to expand with the addition of the Life Sciences Park which features the new Holy Cross Germantown Hospital. In 2014, the Germantown Campus add a new Bioscience Education Center which features wet labs, a detached greenhouse complex, and a meeting/conference center. In 2021, the first phase of an addition and renovation to the Science and Applied Studies Building was completed, and the building was renamed after the former college president, DeRionne P. Pollard, following her departure from the college earlier that year. In April 2024, The Hughes announced to open 140,000 square-foot manufacturing facility in the Pinkney Innovation Complex for Science and Technology on the Montgomery College campus.

=== Other locations ===
Montgomery College has multiple off-campus sites across the county for administrative offices, workforce development services, and community engagement.

The college leases space in two different office buildings to provide Workforce Development courses and services. One of these centers is located in an office building to the south of Westfield Wheaton Mall, and the other is located in Gaithersburg. The college's Office of Community Engagement has offices in the Gaithersburg Library and at the Ethiopian Community Engagement Center in Silver Spring.

==== Central Services Building ====
The Central Services building is located in Rockville, about 3 miles northwest of the Rockville Campus. It is home to the central administrative offices of the college including academic affairs, procurement, board of trustees, public safety, and facilities. There is also a central receiving warehouse located on Gude Drive in Rockville, about 3 miles east of the Central Services building.

==== East County Education Center ====
The East County Education Center is a 55,000 square foot facility located in the eastern suburbs of Silver Spring. Acquired by the college in 2022, the East County Education Center opened in April 2024 to expand and improve access to college services for residents in the eastern areas of Montgomery County. Several industry certification preparation courses, in addition to credit and noncredit courses are offered at this location.

=== Libraries ===
The Montgomery College Libraries system has a location at each campus and the East County Education Center.

== Organization and administration ==
The Montgomery College Foundation is a 501(c)(3) (tax-exempt) charitable organization governed by business, alumni and community members. The foundation, with assets of $112,783,343, according to the 20257 IRS 990 form, also helps fund the college.

Montgomery College's fiscal year 2025 tax-supported operating budget was $283 million, with funding from Montgomery County, the state of Maryland, and student tuition and fees.

== Academics ==
Montgomery College has an enrollment of over 55,000 credit and noncredit students. Of the Montgomery County Public Schools graduates who choose to stay in Maryland for college, 56% attend Montgomery College within the following academic year. The college is one of the most ethnically and culturally diverse in the nation, with students from over 170 countries enrolled. The student body of the college is 54% female and 46% male; 90% of college students are in-county residents; and the student body ethnicity is 27% black, 25% hispanic, and 23% white. The college also employs more than 1,500 faculty members.

The college is accredited by the Middle States Commission on Higher Education. It offers associate degrees and a variety of professional certificates and letters of recognition. The degrees offered are Associate of Arts (A.A.), Associate of Science (A.S.), Associate of Applied Science (A.A.S.), Associate of Arts in Teaching (A.A.T.), and Associate of Fine Arts (A.F.A.).

The Rockville campus offers more than 600 courses in more than 40 curricula. The Takoma Park/Silver Spring campus is known for its nursing and allied health science career programs, and the Germantown campus is known for its science programs including computer science and biotechnology.

Montgomery College offers study abroad to over 25 countries. In 2018, Montgomery College students transferred to 375 four-year colleges and universities in 48 states and Puerto Rico.

== Admissions and costs ==
As with most community colleges, admission to Montgomery College is not selective. The college is open to students who are high school graduates or have received their General Equivalency Diploma (GED); the college does not require standardized test scores, such as the SAT or ACT, for admission.

The total tuition and fees per semester, as of 2022, with 15-hours of credits are:

- $2,661 — Montgomery County resident
- $5,127 — Maryland state resident
- $7,017 — Non Maryland resident

Costs can be more complex than the listed prices, as certain students can qualify for financial aid in the forms of scholarships, student loans, work-study programs, and grants. Tuition rates can be impacted by county budgets and admission trends.

== Student life ==
=== Media ===
Each of Montgomery College's three campuses has its own student-run newspaper: The Globe (Germantown), The Advocate (Rockville), and The Excalibur (Takoma Park/Silver Spring).

At its Rockville campus, the college also operates eRadio WMCR, a student-run online radio station, and the award winning MCTV, a 24/7 cable channel that produces programming for and about the college community.

== Athletics ==
The Montgomery College athletics teams are collectively known as the Raptors. During the Spring 2012 semester the college rebranded the mascot to be representative of all campuses. Sports teams are divided among campuses and compete in the NJCAA. Prior to the Spring 2012 semester, each Montgomery College campus had its own athletic teams. The athletic teams were formerly known as the Knights of the Rockville Campus, the Falcons of the Takoma Park/Silver Spring Campus, and the Gryphons of the Germantown Campus.

The basketball/volleyball arena, Knights Arena in Rockville, was home to the Maryland Nighthawks of the Premier Basketball League for the 2007 season, before the team moved to Georgetown Preparatory School Field House.

The baseball field, Knights Field, is the home field of the Rockville Express, a member of the Cal Ripken, Sr. Collegiate Baseball League.

In the Fall 2018 semester, Montgomery College teams were elevated to Division I and Division II levels. The Montgomery College teams elevated to the Division I level were men's soccer, women's soccer, men's outdoor track and field, and women's outdoor track and field. The Montgomery College volleyball, men's basketball, women's basketball, baseball, and softball teams are now competing in NJCAA Division II.

=== National championships ===
The Knights (Rockville Campus) women's tennis team won the NJCAA Division III National Championship in 2001 and again in 2006. Montgomery College-Rockville golfer Brent Davis won the NJCAA Division III Individual Championship in 2005 with a score of 288.

The Raptors women's track and field team won back to back NJCAA Division III National Championships in 2015 and 2016. The Raptors men's track and field team won back to back to back NJCAA Division III National Championships in 2014, 2015, and 2016.

== Presidents ==
The president of Montgomery College oversees the operations of three academic campuses of Montgomery College in Maryland.

- Hugh G. Price (1948–1953)
- Donald E. Deyo (1953–1965)
- George A. Hodson (1965–1966)
- William C. Strasser (1966–1979)
- Robert E. Parilla (1979–1998)
- Charlene R. Nunley (1998–2007)
- Brian K. Johnson (2007–2009)
- Hercules Pinkney (2009–2010, acting)
- DeRionne P. Pollard (2010–2021)
- Charlene Mickens Dukes (2021–2022, interim)
- Jermaine F. Williams (2022–present)

== Notable people ==
Montgomery College has served over 450,000 credit students since its founding in 1946 including:

- Tori Amos – American singer-songwriter
- Neal Fredericks (1989) – cinematographer
- Molly Guion, artist
- Paul James – American television and film actor
- Zayed Khan – Indian actor
- Chelsea Manning – former United States Army soldier convicted of violations of the Espionage Act and other offenses, after disclosing to WikiLeaks nearly 750,000 military and diplomatic documents.
- Komelia Hongja Okim – sculptor, professor emerita
- Eduardo Sánchez (1990) – director of The Blair Witch Project.
- Barbara Walsh – American musical theatre actress of Broadway shows, who received a Tony Award nomination
- Jerome Williams – former professional basketball player for the National Basketball Association (NBA)
- Morgan Wootten – American high school basketball coach
