= Joan Sheldon (archaeologist) =

British archaeologist (1926–2002)

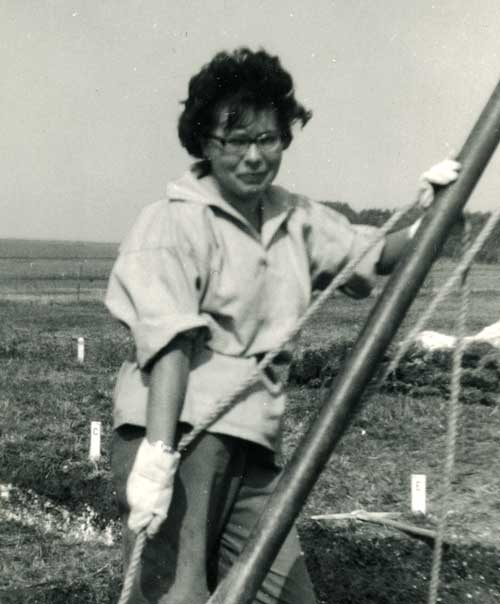
- Sheldon at an archaeological site
- Born: 1926
- Died: 2002 (aged 75–76)
- Occupation: Archaeologist
- Years active: 1948-1983
- Employer: UCL Institute of Archaeology

Joan Sheldon (1926 – 2002) was an environmental archaeologist at the UCL Institute of Archaeology. After her retirement, she wrote about the Department of Environmental Archaeology at UCL, which she is known for. During her career, she specialized in the identification of charcoal.

== Career ==
Sheldon joined the UCL Institute of Archaeology Department of Environmental Arcaheology in 1948. She was assistant to Frederick Zeuner, the head of the department, until his death in 1963. After 1963, she worked under Geoffrey Dimbleby. She specialized in charcoal analysis. During her career as an analyst, she worked with a team of other archaeologists including Wilhelmina Jashemski to analyze charred plant remains in the ruins of the gardens at Herculaneum. She retired from the institute in 1983. After her retirement, she wrote about her work with Frederick Zeuner and the development of environmental archaeology at the Institute of Archaeology.

== See also ==
- Tessa Wheeler - Teacher at the UCL Institute of Archaeology
- Gordon Childe - First director of the UCL Institute of Archaeology
