= Nevada State Scorpions =

- University: Nevada State University
- Nickname: Scorpions
- Association: NAIA
- Conference: GSAC
- Athletic director: Yvonne Wade
- Location: Henderson, Nevada
- First year: 2026
- Varsity teams: 5
- Football stadium: TBD
- Colors: Gold and Black
- Mascot: Sting the Scorpion
- Website: nsuscorpions.com

The Nevada State Scorpions are the athletic teams that represent Nevada State University in Henderson, Nevada. The Scorpions are members of the National Association of Intercollegiate Athletics and the Great Southwest Athletic Conference.

The university fields five varsity athletics teams: men's and women's cross country, indoor and outdoor men's and women's track and field, and women's flag football.

== History ==
In November 2024, Nevada State University was planning to launch a fully-fledged athletics program, to be funded through a proposed student fee. The funds from the proposed fee would be used to fund a campus athletics and recreation center and the launch of two initial sports, women's flag football and men's track and field, which would make Nevada State the only college in Nevada with either sport.

In January 2025, the Las Vegas Raiders donated $100,000 to the NSU women's flag football program.

On January 15, 2025, university President DeRionne Pollard announced the launch of an athletics program during the school's annual State of the University address.

On May 21, NSU announced the hiring of the first athletic director, Yvonne Wade. She will be responsible for hiring head coaches and coordinating competitions within the NAIA.

== Sports sponsored ==
| Men's sports | Women's sports |
|---|---|
| Cross Country | Cross Country |
| | Flag Football |
| Track and field^{†} | Track and field^{†} |
† – Track and field includes both indoor and outdoor.

=== Women's Flag Football ===
The flag football team competed independently for their inaugural season; playing 3 NCAA D1 schools, 4 GSAC schools, 1 CALPAC school, and a community college. The team finished the inaugural season 13-0; outscoring opponents 609-71. The team beat La Sierra University 51-20, to win the first game in program history. Three players Brooklyn Hill and Kaylie Phillips, and incoming freshman Akemi Higa were named to the USA Women’s Flag Football National Team roster.
