= Tim Chambers (baseball) =

American college baseball coach (1965–2019)

Biographical details
- Born: January 27, 1965; Claremore, Oklahoma, U.S.
- Died: October 27, 2019 (aged 54); Las Vegas, Nevada, U.S.
- Education: Southern Utah State College

Playing career

Baseball
- 1984: Dixie JC
- 1985: Utah Tech JC
- 1986: Southern Utah State
- Position: Outfielder

Coaching career (HC unless noted)

Baseball
- 1991–1999: Bishop Gorman HS
- 2000–2010: Southern Nevada CC
- 2011–2015: UNLV

Administrative career (AD unless noted)
- 2003–2010: Southern Nevada CC

Head coaching record
- Overall: 157–132
- Tournaments: NCAA: 1–2

Accomplishments and honors

Championships
- MW regular season (2014)

Awards
- MW Coach of the Year (2014)

Timothy Doyle Chambers (January 27, 1965 – October 27, 2019) was an American college baseball coach. He was head coach of the UNLV Rebels baseball team from 2011 to 2015. He was named to that position prior to the 2011 season.

Born in Claremore, Oklahoma, Chambers graduated from Pleasant Grove High School in Pleasant Grove, Utah. He played at three colleges and earned all-conference honors at all three. These included Dixie State, where he was an All-American in 1984. In 1985, Chambers transferred to Utah Technical College, then to Southern Utah, where he earned his degree in 1989. He began his coaching career in 1991 at Bishop Gorman High School in Las Vegas, where he remained until 1999. In his time with the Gaels, the team won six consecutive Sunset Division championships, and were the state runners up in 1997. Chambers was named NIAA Coach of the Year in 1992 and 1993. He also coached the Las Vegas Knights of American Legion Baseball, where he won three state championships and reached the 1998 American Legion World Series.

In 2000, Chambers was hired to coach the Southern Nevada Coyotes baseball team, an NJCAA squad in Las Vegas. As the first Coyotes coach to manage a game (first coach Roger Fairless resigned prior to the program's first competition due to health issues), Chambers built the program to a major power, including seven conference championships, the regional titles, two district championships and the 2003 NJCAA World Series title. In 2010, Chambers coached the Bryce Harper-led Coyotes to the NJCAA Semifinals.

In the summer of 2010, the Washington Nationals, who would later draft Harper first overall, courted Chambers to be a scout. Instead, a month later Chambers was introduced as the head coach at UNLV, following Buddy Gouldsmith's resignation. In his three seasons, the Rebels have reached 30 wins twice and claimed wins over several ranked teams, including Stanford, TCU, UC Irvine, and Arizona, while entering the rankings in both 2011 and 2013 themselves. Chambers was fired by UNLV in December 2015 after being arrested for driving under the influence.

Chambers died on October 27, 2019.

== Head coaching record ==
Record table
Season	Team	Overall	Conference	Standing	Postseason
UNLV Rebels (Mountain West Conference) (2011–2015)
2011	UNLV	33–25	10–13	5th	
2012	UNLV	26–31	7–17	4th	
2013	UNLV	36–18	18–12	2nd	
2014	UNLV	36–25	20–10	T–1st	NCAA Regional
2015	UNLV	25–31	10–20	6th	
UNLV:		157–132	65–72		
Total:		157–132			
National champion Postseason invitational champion Conference regular season champion Conference regular season and conference tournament champion Division regular season champion Division regular season and conference tournament champion Conference tournament champion

== See also ==
- List of current NCAA Division I baseball coaches
