= College of Southern Nevada =

College in Clark County, Nevada, US

Coordinates: 36.1559°N 115.2322°W

- Type: Public community college
- Established: 1971; 55 years ago
- Parent institution: Nevada System of Higher Education
- Academic affiliations: AMATYC, NevMATYC, Space-grant
- President: Stacy Klippenstein
- Students: 30,000-35,000
- Location: Las Vegas, Nevada, United States
- Campus: Urban North Las Vegas campus: West Charleston campus: Henderson campus
- Colors: Blue & yellow
- Nickname: Coyotes
- Sporting affiliations: ACCAC
- Mascot: Coyote
- Website: www.csn.edu

The College of Southern Nevada (CSN) is a public community college in Clark County, Nevada. The college has more than 2,500 teaching and non-teaching staff and is the largest public college or university in Nevada. It is part of the Nevada System of Higher Education.

== History ==
Founded in 1971 as Clark County Community College, the school became Community College of Southern Nevada in 1991. On March 16, 2007, the Board of Regents of the Nevada System of Higher Education voted to change the name of the school to its current name, College of Southern Nevada, on July 1, 2007.

== Academics ==
CSN provides job training in more than 70 academic programs with more than 180 degree certificates available. The college also offers fifteen bachelor's degrees. The majority of students, 73.5 percent or 25,301, attend part-time and 26.5 percent or 9,108 students attend full-time.

CSN has been accredited by the Northwest Commission on Colleges and Universities since 1975.

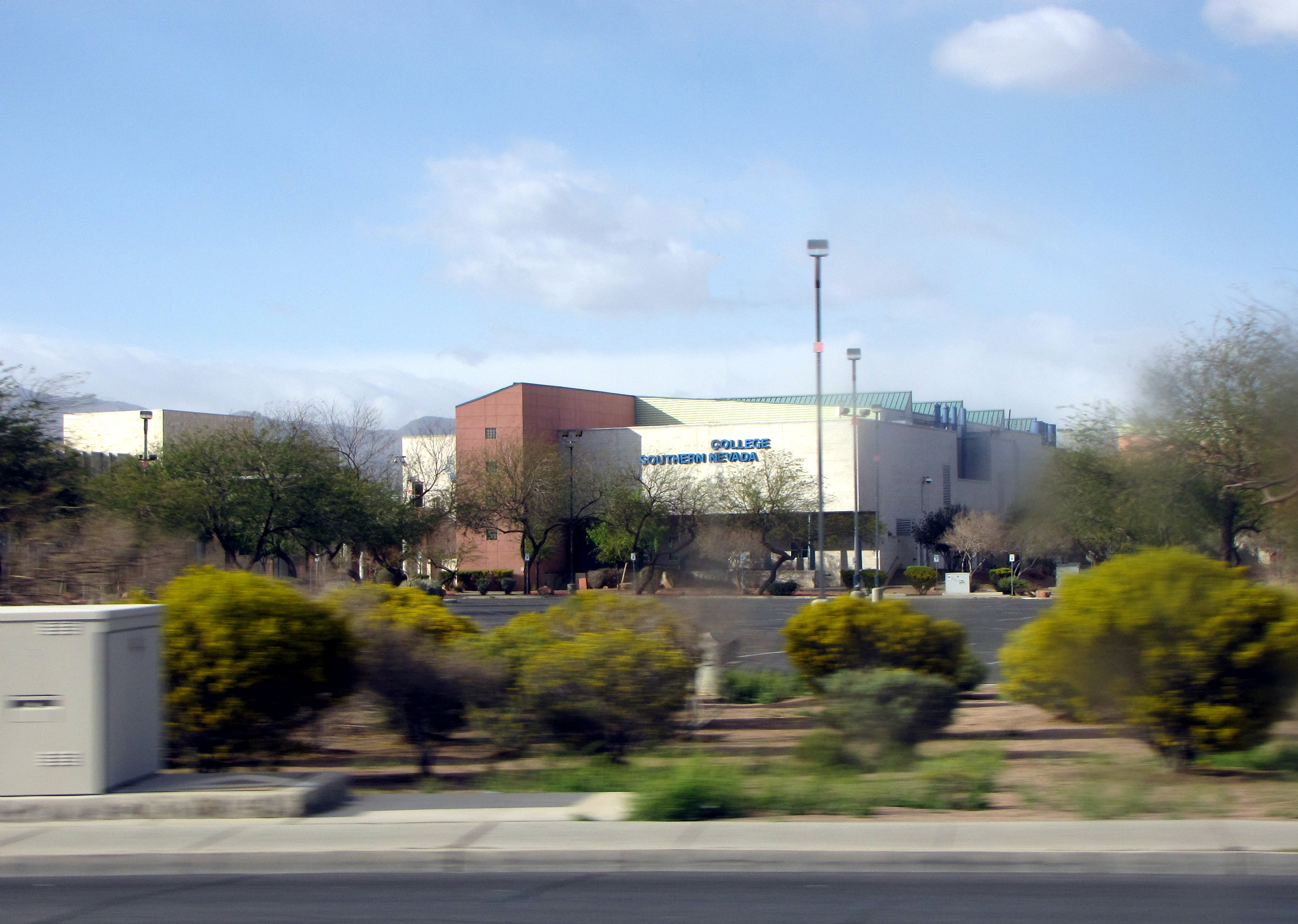
The campus in North Las Vegas

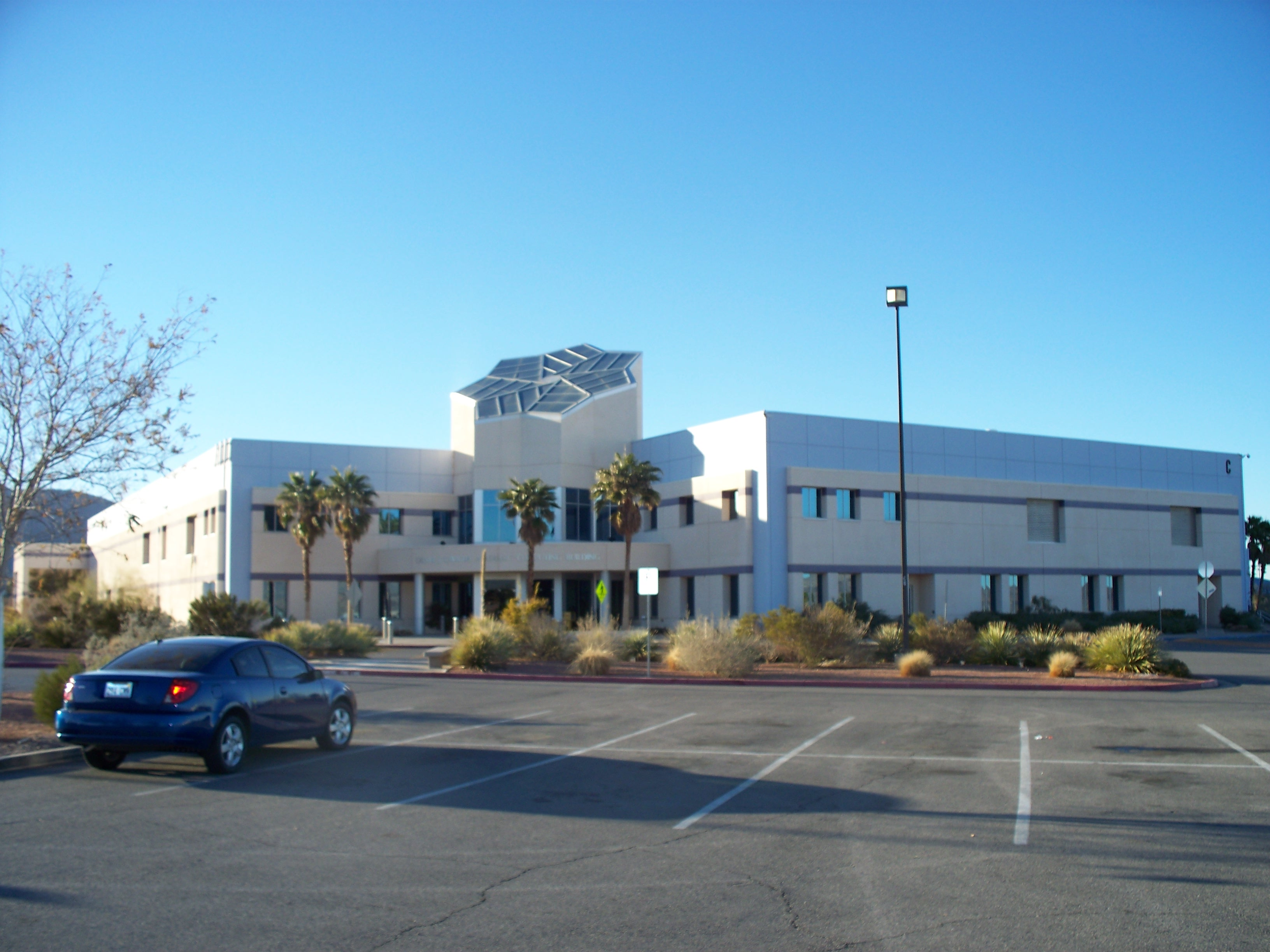
The campus in Henderson, Nevada

Schools and departments at the college include:

- School of Advanced and Applied Technologies
- School of Arts and Letters
- School of Business, Hospitality and Public Services
- School of Education, Behavioral and Social Sciences
- Ralph & Betty Engelstad School of Health Sciences
- School of Science, Engineering and Mathematics
- Division of Workforce and Economic Development

== Student life ==
In fall 2024, 25 percent of students were Caucasian, 41 percent Hispanic, 9 percent Asian and 11 percent African American.

In March 2014 CSN became a Minority Serving Institution under the AANAPISI category. CSN became the first Hispanic Serving Institution in Nevada in January 2015.

Undergraduate demographics as of Fall 2023
Race and ethnicity	Total
Hispanic	41%
White	25%
Black	11%
Asian	9%
Two or more races	8%
Unknown	5%
Native Hawaiian/Pacific Islander	1%
International student	1%
Economic diversity
Low-income (Note: The percentage of students who received an income-based federal Pell grant intended for low-income students.)	31%
Affluent (Note: The percentage of students who are a part of the American middle class at the bare minimum.)	69%

== Athletics ==
The College of Southern Nevada Coyotes compete in the Arizona Community College Athletic Conference of the NJCAA's Division I. The school currently has five athletic programs: men's baseball, men's soccer, women's softball, women's volleyball, and women's soccer. Baseball's first season was in 2000, and softball began its first season in 2004. Volleyball was added in 2014. men and women's soccer started in fall of 2016 and campus-wide improvements will be coming to all three campuses (including the Henderson campus, where athletics will be headquartered).

=== Baseball ===
The Coyotes baseball team was the first intercollegiate athletics program at CSN. The Coyotes' home field, William R. Morse Stadium, is located at the Henderson campus.

On March 18, 1999, CSN hired its first baseball coach, Rodger Fairless, who coached former MLB pitchers Greg and Mike Maddux at Valley High School during the 1980s and was the coach for Green Valley High School when the team won six consecutive Nevada state baseball championships from 1993 to 1998. But, before Fairless would even conduct his first baseball practice at CSN, he stepped down on May 4, 1999, citing health reasons. Fairless was replaced by Tim Chambers, on July 8, 1999.

The Coyotes played their first-ever game on February 1, 2000, against Scottsdale Community College. They joined the Scenic West Athletic Conference in 2002 and became rivals with nearby Dixie State College until Dixie moved to a different conference, NCAA Division II, in 2006. (Note: Then Dixie State Rebels went DII in the RMAC, Now the Utah Tech Trailblazers, DI in the WAC) Since joining the SWAC, CSN has won six conference championships, two region championships and two western district championships. Today, the Coyotes' rivals are the Western Nevada Wildcats, as they are the only two junior colleges in Nevada to have intercollegiate athletics.

On May 31, 2003, the Coyotes made history, defeating the heavily favored San Jacinto-North Gators 4–1 to win the 2003 National Junior College World Series. It is CSN's only national championship in any sport to date.

In 2010, catcher Bryce Harper was selected first overall by the Washington Nationals in the Major League Baseball First Year Player Draft after a season in which he batted .443/.526/.987 (AVG/OBP/SLG) with 98 runs scored, 31 home runs, 98 RBIs, 20 SBs, and a 1.510 OPS, leading the team to a third-place finish at the National Junior College World Series. He was selected as an outfielder. Harper also won the Golden Spikes Award.

On June 11, 2010, just one week after the Coyotes had been eliminated from the JUCO World Series, longtime head coach Tim Chambers took a head coaching job at UNLV. Instead, Chambers was replaced by former Bishop Gorman High School baseball coach Chris Sheff on July 9, 2010.

On November 3, 2010, CSN administration fired Sheff amid an investigation by school administrators after allegations from several players that they were charged $125 to work out with a personal trainer in violation of the NJCAA rules. Sheff claimed that the players were "encouraged" to work out with the trainer, but were not required. Additional allegations made by players included Sheff selling after-program meals on a subscription basis, that Sheff and his staff verbally abused players, and that he and his staff disciplined players with inappropriate physical punishments. Although players reportedly defended Sheff's actions, in December 2010, the independent investigation by CSN administrators and the NJCAA substantiated the allegations and the program was penalized requiring CSN to surrender 20 scholarships over the following two-year period.

Six days later, on November 9, 2010, CSN hired former Green Valley High School coach Nick Garritano as its head baseball coach. Garritano, who was Fairless' successor at Green Valley, won two state championships during his 12 years at the helm, producing a 315-118-1 record. He played sports at Chaparral High School and was inducted into the UNLV Hall of Fame as a former place-kicker for the football team.

On May 5, 2012, the baseball clubhouse was officially named after James B. Whiteaker in a dedication ceremony that took place prior to the final baseball game of the regular season. Today, "Building D" is now known as the James B. Whiteaker Clubhouse.

2015 Coyotes Baseball - The Coyotes sported RHP – Phil Bickford (2015-drafted to SF Giants), SS – Tyler Brown (2015 – drafted to SF Giants), and OF-Matthew Waldren, who was a 2015 NJCAA Superior Academic-All-American.

=== Women's volleyball ===
Fall 2015 was the inaugural season hosting Women's Volleyball.

=== Men/women's soccer ===
The College of Southern Nevada now houses men's and women's Division I soccer; their first season was fall of 2016.

Men's soccer is coached by Geoffrey Hawkins, Christopher Burgess, and Julian Portugal. In their first season of competition they made their way to the 2016 NJCAA DIV. I, men's soccer championship in Tyler, TX. They were defeated by #2 ranked Monroe College.

Women's soccer adopted head coach Rob Dahl of Utah to lead them to victory. Rob is a championship collegiate-level ladies soccer coach and is planning for the ladies to head for the finals during his first year of 2017. The ladies are mixed with local Las Vegas and Utah talents.

==== Men's soccer championships ====
- Scenic West Athletic Conference: 2016

==== Baseball championships ====
- Scenic West Athletic Conference: 2003, 2004, 2005, 2007, 2008, 2010, 2015
- NJCAA Region XVIII: 2003, 2008, 2010, 2015
- NJCAA Western District: 2003, 2010, 2015
- NJCAA Junior College World Series: 2003

=== Softball ===
The Coyotes softball team debuted in the spring of 2004. The Coyotes' home field is located at the Russell Road Recreation Complex, a park operated by the city of Henderson. Talks are in the works to build a softball stadium on the CSN Henderson campus, adjacent to the baseball stadium, with funding being its major obstacle.

The program's first coach was Ric Grenell, who previously had coached women's soccer at CSN from 2000 to 2002 before the sport was discontinued.

After a moderate first season record of 16–30, the 2005 softball team did less well, winning only six games. Shortly after the 2006 season began, another rough start prompted Grenell to resign, and Ysidro Jimenez took over as interim head coach. Jimenez would become the permanent head coach at season's end, and remained the head coach until June 2011.

Under Jimenez, CSN softball enjoyed five winning seasons from 2007 to 2011, including a record 38 wins in the 2011 season. But, after failing to win a conference or region championship, then-assistant coach and former longtime Hawaii-Hilo softball coach Callen Perreira was announced as Jimenez's replacement, and officially took over the helm on July 1, 2011.

In Spring of 2017, CSN welcomed the addition of the new Lady Coyotes Softball Complex at the Henderson campus. Softball also welcomed Head Coach Jim Overturf and Olympian Lori Harrigan-Mack.

== Campuses ==
CSN has three main campuses in the Las Vegas Valley: Henderson, West Charleston, and North Las Vegas.

There are also learning centers in Moapa Valley, Summerlin, Mesquite, Green Valley, Western, Sahara, and Nellis Air Force Base as well as the Debra March Center of Excellence in west Henderson and the West Educational Training Center.

College of Southern Nevada, Charleston campus

== Notable alumni ==
- Phil Bickford, professional baseball player
- Bryce Harper, professional baseball player
- Thomas Pannone, professional baseball player
- Ryan Reeves, professional wrestler known as Ryback
- Jacky Rosen, politician

== See also ==
- Nevada State University, a public university in Henderson
- University of Nevada, Las Vegas, a public university in Las Vegas
- Nevada System of Higher Education, the Nevada state agency responsible for public post-secondary education
