= Wilhelmina Feemster Jashemski =

American archaeobotanist (1910–2007)

Wilhelmina Mary Feemster Jashemski
- Born: July 10, 1910; York, Nebraska
- Died: December 24, 2007 (aged 97); Silver Spring, Maryland
- Occupation: Classical scholar
- Years active: 1935-2007
- Known for: The Gardens of Pompeii, Herculaneum, and the Villas Destroyed by Vesuvius (1979)
- Spouse: Stanley A. Jashemski

Wilhelmina Mary Feemster Jashemski (July 10, 1910 – December 24, 2007) was an American scholar of the ancient site of Pompeii, where her archaeological investigations focused on the evidence of gardens and horticulture in the ancient city. She is remembered for her contributions to archaeobotany at Pompeiian sites, as she developed methods for preserving the remains of roots from antiquity, known as root casting.

== Early life and education ==
Jashemski was born in York, Nebraska. She studied mathematics and Latin at York College, graduating with her bachelor's degree in 1931. Jashemski attended the University of Chicago, earning her doctorate degree in ancient history with a focus in Roman law in 1942.

== Career ==
She began teaching in 1935, and taught at Lindenwood College, Missouri, before serving on the faculty of the University of Maryland from 1946 to 1980.

Jashemski's work at Pompeii, Villa Boscoreale, and Oplontis began in 1961 and continued until 1984. She is known for being a pioneer in the field of garden archaeology. She also worked on the excavation of the gardens of the villa of Hadrian at Tivoli. Jashemski is viewed as a pioneer of the field of garden archaeology in the ancient Mediterranean.

She was awarded the Gold Medal for Distinguished Archaeological Achievement by the Archaeological Institute of America in 1996, after the publication of the second volume of her work The Gardens of Pompeii, Herculaneum, and the Villas Destroyed by Vesuvius.

Jashemski's work is included in the online public database Gardens of the Roman Empire, which launched in April 2021 with entries for more than 100 gardens.

In 2025, the Garden of Hercules was opened at Pompeii Archaeological Park. It is a recreation of a 2,000 year old garden based on Jashemski's work on pollen, spores, and plant fossils in the 1950s.

== Personal life ==
Jashemski's husband was the physicist Stanley A. Jashemski, who photographed many of her excavations for publication.

Jashemski was a member of Takoma Park Presbyterian Church for more than fifty years.

== Works ==
- The Origins and History of the Pro-consular and the Propraetorian Imperium to 27 BC. Chicago: University of Chicago Press, 1950.
- Ancient Roman villa gardens. MacDougall, Elisabeth B., Dumbarton Oaks. Washington, D.C.: Dumbarton Oaks Research Library and Collection. 1987. ISBN 0-88402-162-9
- The Gardens of Pompeii, Herculaneum, and the Villas Destroyed by Vesuvius 2 vol. New Rochelle, New York: Caratzas Bros., 1979, 1993.
- Studia Pompeiana & classica in honor of Wilhelmina F. Jashemski. Jashemski, Wilhelmina F. (Wilhelmina Feemster), Curtis, Robert I. (Robert Irvin). New Rochelle, N.Y.: A.D. Caratzas. 1988–1989. ISBN 0-89241-425-1
- Jashemski, Wilhelmina F. (Wilhelmina Feemster), (1999). A Pompeian herbal: ancient and modern medicinal plants (1st ed.). Austin: University of Texas Press. ISBN 0-292-74061-1
- The natural history of Pompeii. Jashemski, Wilhelmina F. (Wilhelmina Feemster), Meyer, Frederick G. (Frederick Gustav). Cambridge: Cambridge University Press. 2002. ISBN 0-521-80054-4
