= Nevada State University =

Public college in Henderson, Nevada, US

- Nevada State University logo
- Former name: Nevada State College (2002–2023)
- Motto: Omnia Pro Patria (Latin)
- Motto in English: "All For Our Country"
- Type: Public university
- Established: September 3, 2002; 24 years ago (opened)
- Parent institution: Nevada System of Higher Education
- Academic affiliations: Space-grant
- President: Sandra B. Richtermeyer
- Students: 8,800 (fall 2026)
- Postgraduates: 69 (fall 2021)
- Location: Henderson, Nevada, United States; 35°58′55″N 114°56′16″W
- Campus: Suburban
- Colors: Black and gold
- Nickname: Scorpions
- Mascot: Sting the Scorpion
- Website: www.nevadastate.edu

Nevada State University (NSU), formerly Nevada State College, is a public university in Henderson, Nevada, United States. It is part of the Nevada System of Higher Education and opened on September 3, 2002, as Nevada's first state college.

Until 2023, NSU was Nevada State College, when its name was changed to reflect graduate program offerings. NSU is a member organization of the Nevada Space Grant Consortium. It is designated by the United States Department of Education as a minority-serving institution (in particular, students of Hispanic, Asian American and Native American, and Pacific Islander descent).

NSU reported more than 8,800 students for fall 2026. Its main campus is located on a 509-acre (206 ha) site in the southern foothills of Henderson.

== History ==
Liberal arts and sciences building.

James E. and Beverly Rogers student center

Bob and Alison Kasner academic building.

In 1999, the Nevada Legislature created the Advisory Committee to Examine Locating a 4-Year State College in Henderson. In December 1999, the Nevada Board of Regents approved the establishment of Nevada State College.

In February 2000, the committee recommended the new institution be named Nevada State College. The committee members determined Henderson should be part of the official name as they felt additional state colleges would be created in the state. Later that month, the Henderson city council, after having evaluated several potential sites, voted to locate Nevada State College northeast of Lake Mead Parkway and Boulder Highway that was to be part of The LandWell Company's Provenance master-planned community. In March, James Rogers, owner of several television stations and later chancellor of the Nevada System of Higher Education, agreed to chair the college's foundation.

Opponents of the creation of Nevada State College feared at the time that its creation would take resources from UNLV. However, proponents of the college argued the "proposed college would be up to $3,000 cheaper than educating them at the University of Nevada, Las Vegas. The savings would come from smaller salaries for professors, who would teach four classes (per semester), rather than the three or fewer taught by UNLV professors."

In April 2000, the board of regents voted 8–3 to begin negotiations for the Boulder Highway/Lake Mead site despite some concerns that the site was near a permanent toxic waste storage facility. The site raised environmental concerns as it was approximately one mile from a toxic waste storage facility, which prompted the Nevada Board of Regents to select the college's present day site located west of U.S. Route 95 in what was once the Wagon Wheel Industrial Park. In June 2000, the regents requested $5.2 million for start-up costs for the campus and $7 million for instruction costs for its first cohort of students in 2002–03 as well as $43.5 million for capital construction which was to include a library. Governor Kenny Guinn's 2001–2003 executive budget, which was developed later in 2000, reduced the regents' request by recommending "$22.8 million in state funding, 6.8 million to open it to 1,000 full-time students in the fall of 2002, and $16 million to help construct the first campus building."

Nevada State College opened in 2002. The college acquired accreditation, moved with its master plan for a 509-acre (2.06 km^{2}) campus, and its first permanent building, the liberal arts and sciences building, opened in August 2008. In 2008, Nevada State College launched a campus-wide recruitment and retention initiative. Between the spring 2009 and spring 2010 semesters, Nevada State College increased enrollment by over 20%, to over 2,600 students.

Among the different educational institutions of the NSHE, the largest 2009 budget cuts by the state legislature were for Nevada State College at 24.1%. Neighboring College of Southern Nevada had its budget cut by only 4.9%. Students protested the cuts which left student services understaffed and about 25% of the university's teaching and administrative positions vacant in 2008. The Nevada System of Higher Education faced a $900 million budget deficit and there were proposals to close down Nevada State College along with other NSHE programs and schools.

DeRionne Pollard became Nevada State University's eighth president on August 16, 2021. She was the first Black female president within the Nevada System of Higher Education.

In March 2023, the Nevada Legislature introduced legislation to change the school's name from Nevada State College to Nevada State University. The legislation passed and the change took effect on July 1, 2023.

Sandra B. Richtermeyer became president of Nevada State University on August 1, 2026, succeeding Acting President Amber Lopez Lasater.

=== Presidents ===
The following persons served as president:

No.	President	Term start	Term end	Refs.
1	Richard Moore	December 1999	March 2002	
interim	Christine Chairsell	April 2002	August 2002	
2	Kerry Romesburg	September 2002	June 2004	
interim	Patricia Miltenberger	July 1, 2004	January 31, 2005	
6	Fred Maryanski	February 1, 2005	July 2, 2010 (Note: Died in office.)	
interim	Lesley Di Mare	August 27, 2010	October 31, 2011	
interim	Bart Patterson	November 1, 2011	April 30, 2012	
7	Bart Patterson	April 30, 2012	June 30, 2021	
8	DeRionne P. Pollard	August 16, 2021	July 31, 2025	
acting (Note: Served as Officer in Charge)	Amber Lopez Lasater	August 1, 2025	October 17, 2025	
acting (Note: Served as Acting President)	Amber Lopez Lasater	October 18, 2025	July 31, 2026	
9	Sandra B. Richtermeyer	August 1, 2026	Present	

Table notes:

== Campus ==
Nevada State University's 509-acre (206 ha) site is located at the base of the McCullough mountain range in the southeastern corner of Henderson. The site was annexed from the Bureau of Land Management to the city of Henderson in November 2002 as part of the Clark County Conservation of Public Lands and Natural Resources Act of 2002.

The college opened its first permanent building, the liberal arts and sciences building, on its 509-acre site in August 2008. The 42,000-square-foot (3,900 m^{2}) building has faculty offices, labs and seven classrooms. The building includes SMART classroom technologies which allow professors to use a wide array of audio and visual teaching techniques, and scientific equipment for educational use.

In 2010, the Nevada Board of Regents approved the college's campus master plan, which calls for the development of roughly six million square feet of academic, residential, retail, and cultural space by full campus build-out in order to accommodate 25,000–30,000 students.

In addition to the liberal arts and sciences building, NSU has also opened the Bob and Allison Kasner academic building along with the James E. and Beverly Rogers student center. The Glenn and Ande Christenson education building is a 65,000 sq ft (6,000 m^{2}) building, which includes a speech pathology lab, psycho-educational mental health clinic, and the early childhood education center, and provides students with immersive learning opportunities while providing needed services to the community. The Raker student success center assists students with financial aid and admissions. The Dawson Building includes classrooms, athletics, The Collective, a fitness center, facilities, and police services. The Village is the name of on-campus housing.

NSU no longer leases two auxiliary buildings in downtown Henderson on Water Street.

=== North Las Vegas campus ===
Nevada State University is developing a satellite campus in downtown North Las Vegas at Lake Mead Boulevard and Las Vegas Boulevard North. Located within the 19-acre NLV Gateway mixed-use development, the campus will occupy a three-story, 30,000-square-foot academic building. It is expected to open in fall 2027. The project is supported through a public-private partnership involving the City of North Las Vegas Redevelopment Agency, the Nevada Legislature, NV Energy Foundation, and an anonymous donor.

== Academics ==
NSU offers graduate degrees in school psychology, speech-language pathology and nursing leadership, and many bachelor's degree programs. In the fall of 2008, Nevada State College launched Nevada's first Bachelor of Science degree in the education of the deaf and hard of hearing. The program addresses the deaf culture and its integration of deaf students into specific subject areas. The college's academic programs are housed in one of three schools: the School of Liberal Arts, Sciences and Business, the School of Education, and the School of Nursing.

=== School of Liberal Arts, Sciences, and Business ===
The School of Liberal Arts, Sciences, and Business (LASB) offers bachelor's degree programs and undergraduate minors in its disciplines. It also provides a 3+1 bachelor's degree program in visual media in partnership with Truckee Meadows Community College in which students complete three years of coursework at Truckee Meadows and their final year through Nevada State University, with instruction remaining on the community college's campus. A partnership with Roseman University of Health Sciences provides an accelerated pathway from a Bachelor of Science in biology to a Doctor of Pharmacy degree. The program allows students to apply their first year of pharmacy coursework toward completion of their bachelor's degree.

=== School of Education ===
The School of Education (SOE) offers undergraduate and graduate teacher education programs. It is housed in the Glenn and Ande Christenson Education Building, which opened in 2021. The 65,000-square-foot facility includes an early childhood education center, speech pathology facilities, and a Psychoeducational Mental Health Clinic.

=== School of Nursing ===
Nevada State University’s School of Nursing offers a Bachelor of Science in Nursing (BSN), an RN-to-BSN pathway for registered nurses with an associate degree, and a Master of Science in Nursing Leadership. The prelicensure BSN program prepares students for initial licensure as registered nurses.

Nursing instruction includes classroom coursework, laboratory and simulation experiences, and supervised clinical practice. The school’s simulation center opened at its current location in fall 2021. In 2026, its simulation program received full accreditation in Teaching/Education from the Society for Simulation in Healthcare.

The school’s baccalaureate nursing program is approved by the Nevada State Board of Nursing and accredited by the Commission on Collegiate Nursing Education.

Undergraduate demographics as of fall 2023
Race and ethnicity	Total
Hispanic	46%
White	21%
Asian	10%
Black	10%
Two or more races	6%
Unknown	5%
Native Hawaiian/Pacific Islander	1%
Economic diversity
Low-income (Note: The percentage of students who received an income-based federal Pell grant intended for low-income students.)	41%
Affluent (Note: The percentage of students who are a part of the American middle class at the bare minimum.)	59%

=== Accreditation ===
When it originally opened, Nevada State College operated under the accreditation of the University of Nevada, Reno. In 2011, Nevada State College received independent accreditation at the baccalaureate degree level from the Northwest Commission on Colleges and Universities.

== Athletics ==
As of November 2024, Nevada State University was actively planning to launch a fully-fledged athletics program, to be funded through a proposed student fee. If approved by the state board of regents, the funds from the proposed fee would be used to fund a campus athletics and recreation center and the launch of two initial sports, women's flag football and men's track and field. On April 13, 2026, it was announced NSU would join the Great Southwest Athletic Conference. In the coming year the school will add men's and women's cross country, and women's track and field, both indoor and outdoor.

Nevada State University launched its intercollegiate athletics program with competition beginning in spring 2026. Its athletic teams are known as the Scorpions.
