= Charlene R. Nunley =

American university administrator

President of Montgomery College
- In office 1998–2007

Personal details
- Born: 1950 (age 75–76) Pittsburgh, Pennsylvania, United States
- Education: Pennsylvania State University (BA, MEd); George Washington University Graduate School of Education and Human Development (PhD)

Charlene R. Nunley (born 1950) was the first woman to become president of Montgomery College, which is located in the state of Maryland in the United States.

== Formative years ==
Born in Pittsburgh, Pennsylvania in 1950, Nunley was awarded Bachelor of Arts and Master of Education degrees from Pennsylvania State University in 1972 and 1973, respectively. She earned her Bachelor of Arts degree while she was a member of Penn State's Psychology Honors Program.

In 1986, she was awarded a Doctor of Philosophy degree in Educational Policy Studies by George Washington University. She is also a graduate of Leadership Maryland and Leadership Montgomery.

== Career ==
Nunley began her academic career at the Potomac State College of West Virginia University, and was then hired as the director of institutional research at Howard Community College in Columbia, Maryland.

Hired by Montgomery College in 1986, she held various positions in administration, budget and finance, planning, and resource development between 1986 and 2007. From 1986 to 1989, she served as vice president of planning and advancement. She was then appointed as professor of business administration in 1989, a role she fulfilled through 1990, when she was appointed as executive vice president and chief administrative officer of the college. She held that position until 1999, when she became the first woman in the college's history to be appointed as the college's president and chief executive officer. Only the sixth person to ever hold this senior-level management position, she was selected for the job following a nationwide search process that was conducted by the college's board of trustees.

During her tenure as president, Montgomery College strengthened the college's general education curriculum and faculty development programs, improved fund development efforts to raise millions of dollars in grants and financial contributions from individual and corporate donors, planned and built new high technology and instructional facilities, including the Information Technology Institute, initiated a new college honors program, collaborated with multiple state universities to offer daytime baccalaureate degree programs in Montgomery County for the first time, including the Universities at Shady Grove. Among the major gifts received by the college after Nunley's appointment were a $1.26 million donation by corporate securities advisor Gordon Macklin and his wife on January 27, 1999, which was, at that time, the largest single charitable gift to a Maryland community college. It funded the establishment of the Gordon and Marilyn Mack in Business Institute. This major gift was followed by a second, larger donation by computer systems manager Paul Peek, who donated $1.3 million to the college's Humanities Institute and Art Department, making the Peek gift the single largest individual gift ever awarded to a Maryland community college. In response, Montgomery College named the Humanities Institute and the Rockville Campus's Art Building in Peck's name.

Nunley retired as president of the college in 2007.

== Public service and community outreach ==
Nunley has also served on the boards of directors of multiple professional and nonprofit organizations in the region, including the:

- Maryland Association of Community College Presidents;
- Montgomery County Executive’s Economic Advisory Council; and the
- Technology Council of Maryland.

== Awards and other honors ==
Nunley has received multiple awards and other honors during her career, including a nomination by the Baltimore-based newspaper, the Daily Record, as one of "Maryland's Top 100 Women" for the year 2001.
