= Komelia Hongja Okim =

Korea-born sculptor

Komelia Hongja Okim (born 1939) is a sculptor born in Seoul, Korea. She is also known as Komelia Okim, Kim Hongja, and Hongja Kim Okim received a Bachelor of Arts from Indiana University Bloomington in 1969 and a Masters of Fine Arta from the same institution in 1973. She later traveled to Korea to learn traditional metalworking techniques. She taught at Montgomery College in Rockville, MD from 1972 to 2014, and retired as a professor emerita.

Public collections holding work by Komelia Hongja Okim include Blue House (official residence of the president of the Republic of Korea), the Honolulu Museum of Art, the National Museum of Modern and Contemporary Art (Kwachon, Kyungki Do, Korea), the Museum of Arts and Design (New York City), the Renwick Gallery (Washington DC), and the Victoria and Albert Museum.
