= Brian K. Johnson =

Brian K. Johnson is a former community college CEO and was removed as president of Montgomery College.

== Education ==
Brian Johnson earned a bachelor's degree in psychology from Ottawa University. He earned a M.A. in education and Ed.D. in educational leadership from Northern Arizona University.

== Career ==
Brian Johnson served as CEO of the Community College of Allegheny County in Pittsburgh overseeing a capital bond project of US$386,000,000. He was appointed president of Montgomery College in 2007, but was placed on paid administrative leave in 2009 after a no-confidence vote by the college's faculty. Johnson's leave came amid criticisms of excessive spending, the creation of an abusive work environment, and absenteeism. At the time he had an outstanding arrest warrant in Maricopa, where a job offer for student affairs chancellor was rescinded in 2011.
