= Takoma Park Presbyterian Church =

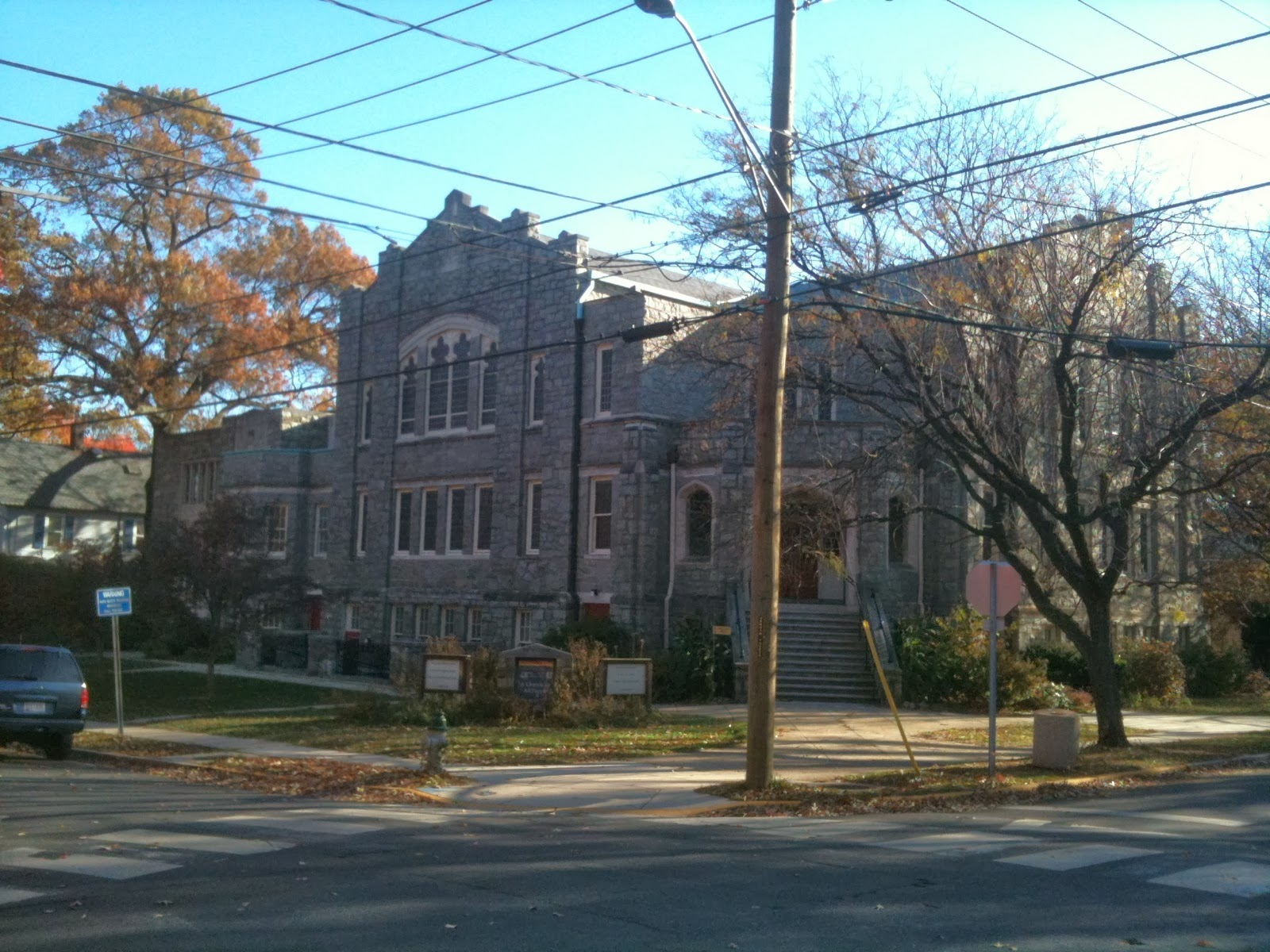
- Takoma Park Presbyterian Church
- Takoma Park Presbyterian Church
- 38°58′37″N 77°00′47″W
- Country: United States
- Denomination: Presbyterian
- Website: takomaparkpc.org

History
- Founded: 1888

Architecture
- Architectural type: Gothic revival

The Takoma Park Presbyterian Church is a Presbyterian Church located in Takoma Park, Maryland. The church was founded in 1888 as the Union Chapel.
