= Washington Area Women's Foundation =

U.S. non-profit organization

Washington Area Women's Foundation is a nonprofit organization located in Washington, DC, that brings together women who act as donors and activists, led by President and CEO, Tamara Wilds. This network of women invests in the lives of low-income women – and single moms in particular – so they, in turn, can enrich the lives of their children.

The Women's Foundation's mission is to foster philanthropy to improve the lives of women and girls in the surrounding region. The Women's Foundation accomplishes this by: expanding and leveraging women's philanthropy; increasing social change philanthropy in the community; providing grants, operational resources and technical assistance to local organizations; and serving as a regional voice for women and girls.

Washington Area Women's Foundation serves Washington, DC, Montgomery County and Prince George's County in Maryland, and Alexandria, Fairfax County and Arlington County in Virginia. The Women's Foundation is the only public foundation in the metropolitan DC area that is dedicated to improving the lives of women and girls.

== History ==
The organization was first conceived by a small group of women who got together for a Sunday afternoon tea on May 18, 1997, in Bethesda, Maryland.

In 1998, Washington Area Women's Foundation was officially established. It was founded on the principle that women, working together, can enhance the physical, social, and financial well-being of women and girls in the Washington metropolitan area by providing financial resources to local nonprofits already engaged in innovative, effective work for communities in need.

In its first year, The Women's Foundation increased its individual donors from 75 to over 300 with creative fundraising strategies, including over $5,000 from Beanie Baby sales at Sandy Rubin's store, garnering her The Women's Foundation's first Entrepreneurial Philanthropy award.

Since 2006, The Women's Foundation has granted over $1 million per year to area nonprofits.

== Philanthropy ==
The Women's Foundation encourages philanthropic investments in the community in a number of ways intended to encourage members to donate at whatever level is best for them.

Individuals Some participants choose to be individual donors, making one-time, occasional, or regular donations both large and small.

Giving Circles There are two giving circles that allow women to come together and contribute as a group. The Rainmakers Giving Circle, founded in 2003, supports programs for young women and girls between the ages of 10 and 21 that empower and increase competence in the areas of employment, education, health and life skills. Rainmakers Giving Circle members commit to give $5,000 each over two years. To date, they've invested more than $200,000 in nonprofits supporting young women and girls in the DC metropolitan area.

Since 2004, the African American Women's Giving Circle has invested nearly $120,000 in nonprofits supporting African American women and girls. The circle includes 15-25 women who have each made a financial commitment of at least $2,000 over a two-year period and agreed to work together to determine which local nonprofits will receive grants.

Leadership Networks The Women's Foundation has also created two Leadership Networks.

The Washington 100 combines the resources of more than 100 women and men who make a two-year commitment of $10,000 each. The result is more than $1 million of critical support to fuel programs that build strong communities through investments in women and girls.

The 1K Club is a network of emerging philanthropists committed to strengthening the effectiveness of The Women's Foundation and its work. 1K Club members each contribute a minimum of $1,000 paid over a two-year period—or approximately $42 per month.

Leadership Luncheon The Leadership Luncheon is The Women's Foundation's annual fundraising event. It is designed to bring together nonprofits that benefit from The Women's Foundation, donors, and others involved with The Foundation for an afternoon of raising money, networking, learning more about The Foundation, and celebrating those involved.

== Focus areas and partnerships ==
Washington Area Women's Foundation distributes funds primarily through grants for which local organizations apply. The Women's Foundation also provides visibility and technical assistance to local nonprofits referred to as Grantee Partners.

Since 1998, The Women's Foundation has assisted more than 100 Grantee Partners who aid women and girls in the DC metro area. The Grantee Partners deal with a wide range of issues including: homelessness, healthcare, child care, immigration, poverty, rape, women's rights, human trafficking, reproductive rights, home ownership, domestic violence, and job training.

In 2005, The Women's Foundation launched Stepping Stones, a multi-year, regional initiative with the goal of building long-term financial independence and economic security of low-income women and women-headed families. It's a data-driven strategy focused on single mothers earning between $15,000 - $35,000 per year. From July 2008 to June 2009, despite being in the middle of an economic downturn, Grantee Partners that received money from Stepping Stones helped nearly 1,000 women increase their assets by $2.2 million, helped 66 women become homeowners, and helped over 70 women increase their income by more than $600,000 due to job placements.

The Leadership Awards is an annual program that invests in the work of outstanding, emerging community-based organizations that serve the critical needs of women and girls. It provides an opportunity for members of The Women's Foundation community to volunteer in the selection of awardees through “citizen philanthropy.” Each year, 40-60 volunteers evaluate organizations that apply for the leadership awards through interviews and site visits. The volunteers then choose 10 nonprofits to receive Leadership Awards. An online vote opens up the process to the rest of the community, allowing anyone to cast a vote for the organization of their choice to get an additional monetary award.

The Be That Woman movement stemmed from a video that was created for Washington Area Women's Foundation by RP3 Agency. Debuting at the 2009 Leadership Luncheon on October 20, 2009, the video is an animated short that tells the story of a woman who receives assistance in a time of need and is then inspired to help others. Luncheon attendees were encouraged to forward a link to the video to others.

== Research ==
Washington Area Women's Foundation also funds research and reports. In 2003, The Women's Foundation published A Portrait of Women & Girls in the Washington Metropolitan Area (The Portrait Project)—the first and only comprehensive look at the status of women and girls in the region. This groundbreaking study's principal conclusion was that low-income, women-headed families – single mothers and their children – are, by far, the most economically vulnerable population in our region.

The Portrait Project was the result of a two-year process during which The Women's Foundation collaborated with a wide cross-section of community-based organizations, foundations, research institutions and individuals, for nonprofits, policymakers and philanthropists to better inform their programming and grantmaking.
