= Nevada System of Higher Education =

Public university system in Nevada

The Nevada System of Higher Education (NSHE, formerly the University and Community College System of Nevada or UCCSN) is a state government unit in Nevada that oversees its public system of colleges and universities. It was formed in 1968 to oversee all state-supported higher education in the state. Two doctoral-granting research universities, two state colleges, three community colleges and one research institute comprise the land grant system. About 105,000 students attend the degree-granting campuses.

== Schools ==
Location of public colleges and Universities in Nevada. For colleges with multiple campuses, the flagship campus is labeled. Black dots represent four year colleges. Blue dots represent community colleges. Red dots represent graduate institutes.

=== Four-year ===
- Great Basin College, previously known as Northern Nevada College, is a four-year public college serving northeastern Nevada.
- Nevada State University, founded in 2002, is Nevada's newest four-year public college. They started their athletic program in 2026 and is part of Great Southwest Athletic Conference of the NAIA.
- University of Nevada, Las Vegas was the second four-year university in the state to be founded, initially as Nevada Southern University in 1957. Winning its autonomy in 1965, Nevada Southern was renamed in 1969 due to the need for better national recognition and partially for separation from the University of Nevada. UNLV is classified by the Carnegie Classification of Institutions of Higher Learning as an R1 - Very high research activity university. It is one of two Tier 1 universities in Nevada. Their athletic program is part of the Mountain West Conference of the NCAA Division I.
- University of Nevada, Reno is the oldest University in the state, established in 1874 as a land-grant institution. It is the flagship institution of the state and known as the University of Nevada. UNR is classified by the Carnegie Classification of Institutions of Higher Learning as an R1 - Very high research activity university. It is one of two Tier 1 universities in Nevada. Their athletic program is also part of the Mountain West Conference of the NCAA Division I.

=== Two-year ===
- College of Southern Nevada, founded in 1971 as Clark County Community College and later renamed the Community College of Southern Nevada before gaining its current name, is the largest institution of higher education, public or private, in Nevada. It is also the third-largest community college in the United States. Their athletic program competes in the NJCAA.
- Truckee Meadows Community College is a community college serving residents of Reno and the surrounding area. Their athletic program also competes in the NJCAA.
- Western Nevada College, previously known as Western Nevada Community College, is a community college serving northwestern Nevada.

=== Graduate-only ===
- Desert Research Institute (DRI) is a research institution primarily focused on environmental sciences; many UNLV and UNR graduate students are advised by DRI faculty.

== Nevada State Board of Regents ==
The Nevada State Board of Regents is elected by district every six years, rotating in phases every two years. It will shift to a body with nine members elected for four years starting in January 2029. The election is formally nonpartisan, with the party affiliations below reflecting known political history, candidate self-declaration, or state party support.

District	Name	Party	Start	Term Ends
1	Carlos Fernandez	Democratic	January 16, 2025	2028
2	Jennifer McGrath	Republican	March 1, 2025 (appointed)	2026
3	Byron Brooks, Chair	Republican	January 15, 2021	2026
4	Aaron Bautista	Democratic	January 16, 2025	2028
5	Patrick Boylan	Democratic	January 15, 2021	2026 (primaried)
6	Heather Brown	Democratic	January 13, 2023	2028
7	Susan Brager	Democratic	January 13, 2023	2028
8	Pete Goicoechea	Republican	December 4, 2024 (appointed)	2026 (special)
9	Carol Del Carlo	Republican	January 2017	2028 (term limited)
10	Joseph Arrascada	Democratic	January 15, 2021	2026
11	Jeff Downs	Republican	January 13, 2023	2028
12	Amy Carvalho	Democratic	January 18, 2019	2028
13	Stephanie Goodman, Vice Chair	Republican	January 13, 2023	2028
